= 2025 Durham mayoral election =

- November 4, 2025
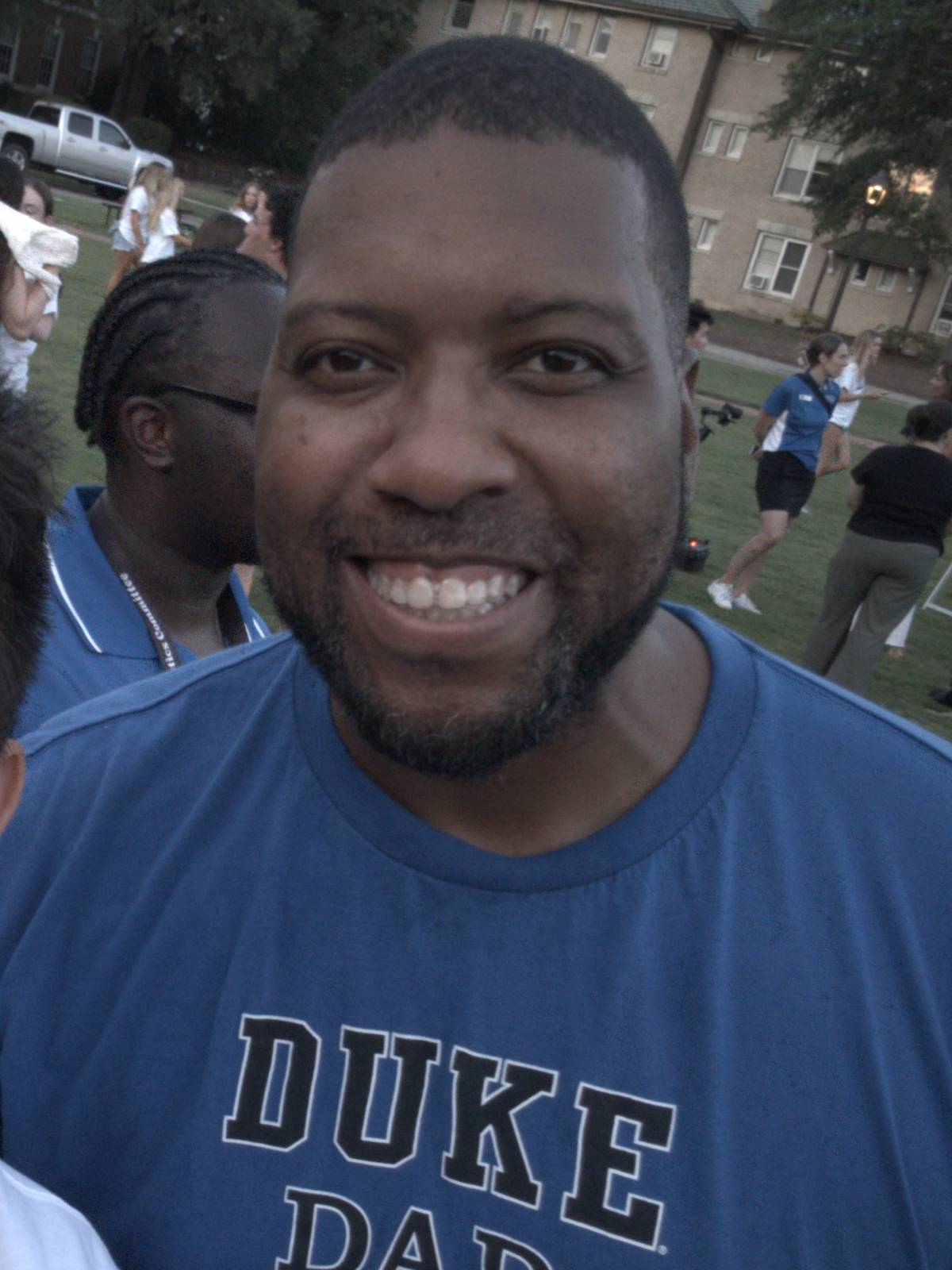

Candidate	Leonardo Williams	Anjanée Bell
Popular vote	26,402	19,290
Percentage	57.55%	42.05%

Williams
40–50%
50–60%
60–70%
70–80%
Bell
30–40%
40–50%
50–60%
Mayor before election
Leonardo Williams
Elected mayor
Leonardo Williams

The 2025 Durham mayoral election was held on November 4, 2025, to elect the mayor of Durham, North Carolina for a two-year term. The nonpartisan blanket primary was held on October 7, with Anjanée Bell advancing to the general election alongside incumbent mayor Leonardo Williams, who was then re-elected.

== Primary election ==
=== Candidates ===
==== Advanced to general ====
- Leonardo Williams, incumbent mayor
- Anjanée Bell, state parks arts coordinator and daughter of former mayor Bill Bell

==== Eliminated in primary ====
- Pablo Friedmann, administrator for Durham Public Schools
- Lloyd Phillips
- Rafiq Zaidi, imam

==== Withdrawn ====
- Angela Reddick, former prison guard

=== Endorsements ===
Leonardo Williams

State legislators

- Wib Gulley, former mayor (1985–1989) and state senator from the 13th district (1993–2003)

Local officials

- Steve Schewel, former mayor (2017–2021)
- Cora Cole-McFadden, former city councilmember from Ward 1 (2001–2007)
- Farad Ali, former at-large city councilmember (2007–2011)
- Charlie Reece, former at-large city councilmember (2015–2022)

Labor unions

- Ironworkers Local 848

Organizations

- Equality North Carolina
- Democratic Municipal Officials

Newspapers

- INDY Week
Anjanée Bell

Local officials

- Bill Bell, former mayor (2001–2017) (candidate's father)
- Elaine O'Neal, former mayor (2021–2023)

Individuals

- Clay Aiken, television personality and runner-up of American Idol season 2

Labor unions

- United Electrical, Radio and Machine Workers of America Local 150
- Triangle Labor Council
- North Carolina State AFL-CIO

=== Results ===
2025 Durham mayoral primary election results
Candidate	Votes	%
Leonardo Williams (incumbent)	13,924	55.35%
Anjanée Bell	7,492	29.78%
Pablo Friedmann	3,099	12.32%
Lloyd Phillips	329	1.31%
Rafiq Zaidi	313	1.24%
Total votes	25,157	100.00%

== General election ==
Incumbent mayor Leonardo Williams and Anjanée Bell advanced to the November 4 general election after placing first and second in the nonpartisan blanket primary, with 55.35% and 29.78% of the vote respectively.

=== Results ===
2025 Durham mayoral general election results
Candidate	Votes	%
Leonardo Williams (incumbent)	26,402	57.55%
Anjanée Bell	19,290	42.05%
Write-in	187	0.41%
Total votes	45,879	100.00%
