= 2023 Durham mayoral election =

- November 7, 2023
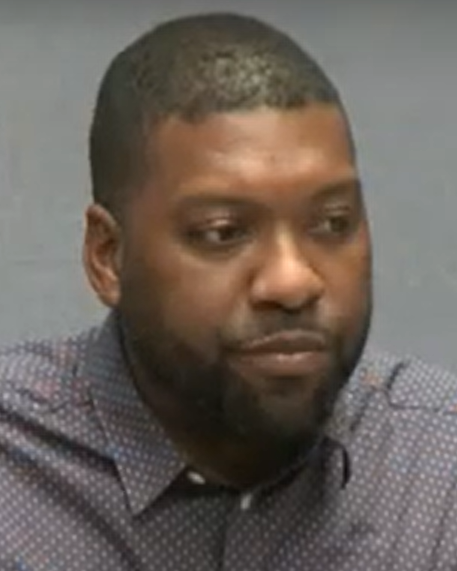

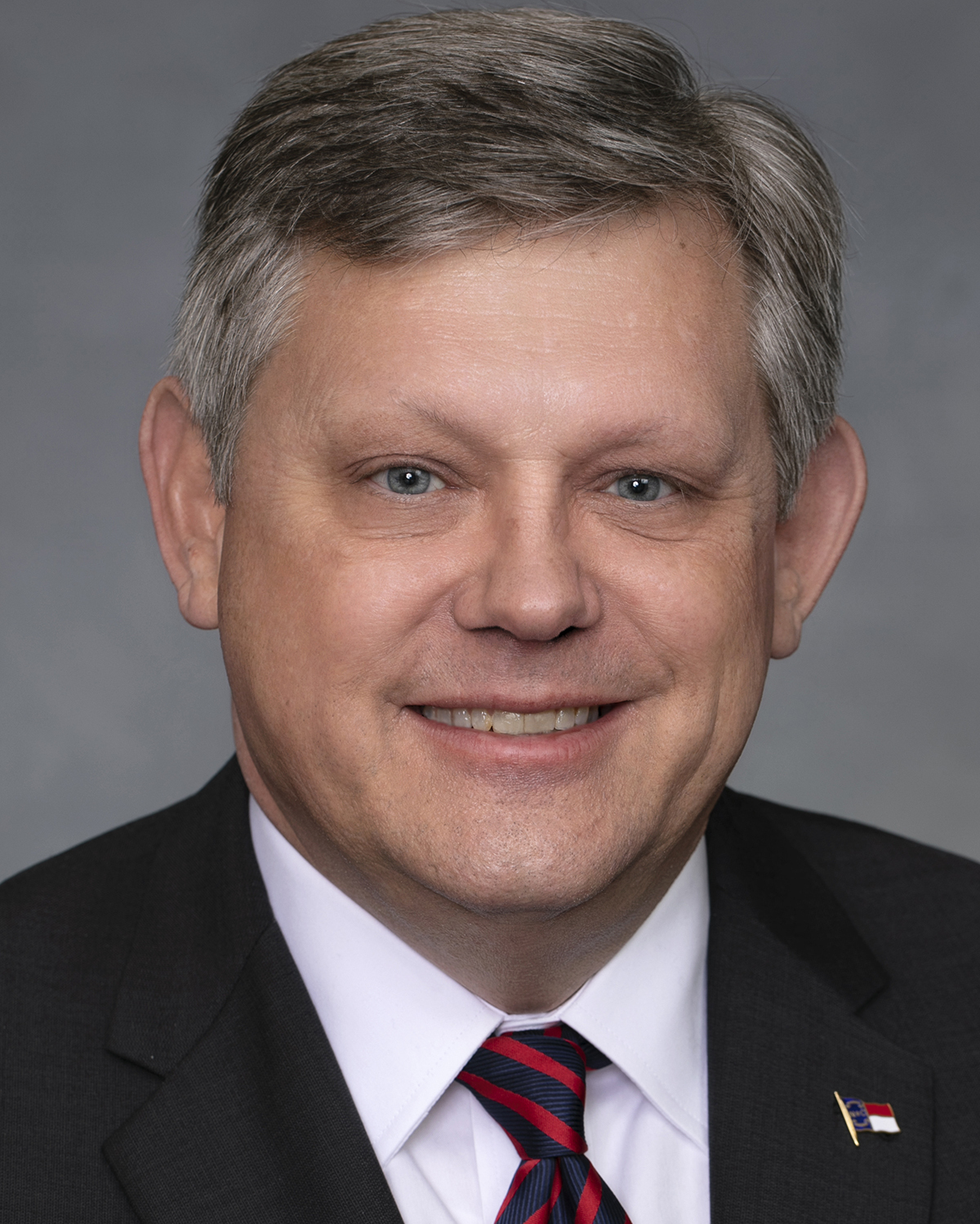
Candidate	Leonardo Williams	Mike Woodard
Popular vote	24,124	13,755
Percentage	63.5%	36.2%
- Williams: 50–60% 60–70% 70–80% 80–90% ≥90% Woodard: 50–60% 70–80% Tie: 50% No data
Mayor before election
Elaine O'Neal
Elected mayor
Leonardo Williams

The 2023 Durham mayoral election was held on November 7, 2023, to elect the mayor of Durham, North Carolina. Incumbent mayor Elaine O'Neal, the first black woman elected to the position, chose to retire after a single two-year term.

The nonpartisan blanket primary was held on October 10. City councilor Leonardo Williams and state senator Mike Woodard advanced to the general election. Williams defeated Woodard by a wide margin.

== Primary election ==
=== Candidates ===
==== Advanced to general ====
- Leonardo Williams, city councilor
- Mike Woodard, North Carolina state senator from the 22nd district

==== Eliminated in primary ====
- Charlitta Burruss, community advocate and candidate for mayor in 2021
- Jontae Dunston
- DeDreana Freeman, city councilor
- Nick Pettiford, retail store manager
- Marshall Williams Jr., board member for Preservation Durham and sales specialist
- Sylvester Williams, pastor and perennial candidate

==== Declined ====
- Mark-Anthony Middleton, city councilor and mayor pro tempore
- Elaine O'Neal, incumbent mayor
- Kenneth Spaulding, former North Carolina state representative from the 16th district

=== Results ===
2023 Durham mayoral primary
Candidate	Votes	%
Leonardo Williams	12,206	51.22%
Mike Woodard	6,902	28.96%
DeDreana Freeman	3,380	14.18%
Marshall Williams Jr.	502	2.11%
Sylvester Williams	348	1.46%
Charlitta Burruss	225	0.94%
Nick Pettiford	202	0.85%
Jontae Dunston	66	0.28%
Total votes	23,831	100.00%

== General election ==
=== Results ===
2023 Durham mayoral general election results
Candidate	Votes	%
Leonardo Williams	24,124	63.47
Mike Woodard	13,755	36.19
Total votes	37,879	100.00
