= Chelsea Cook =

American attorney and politician

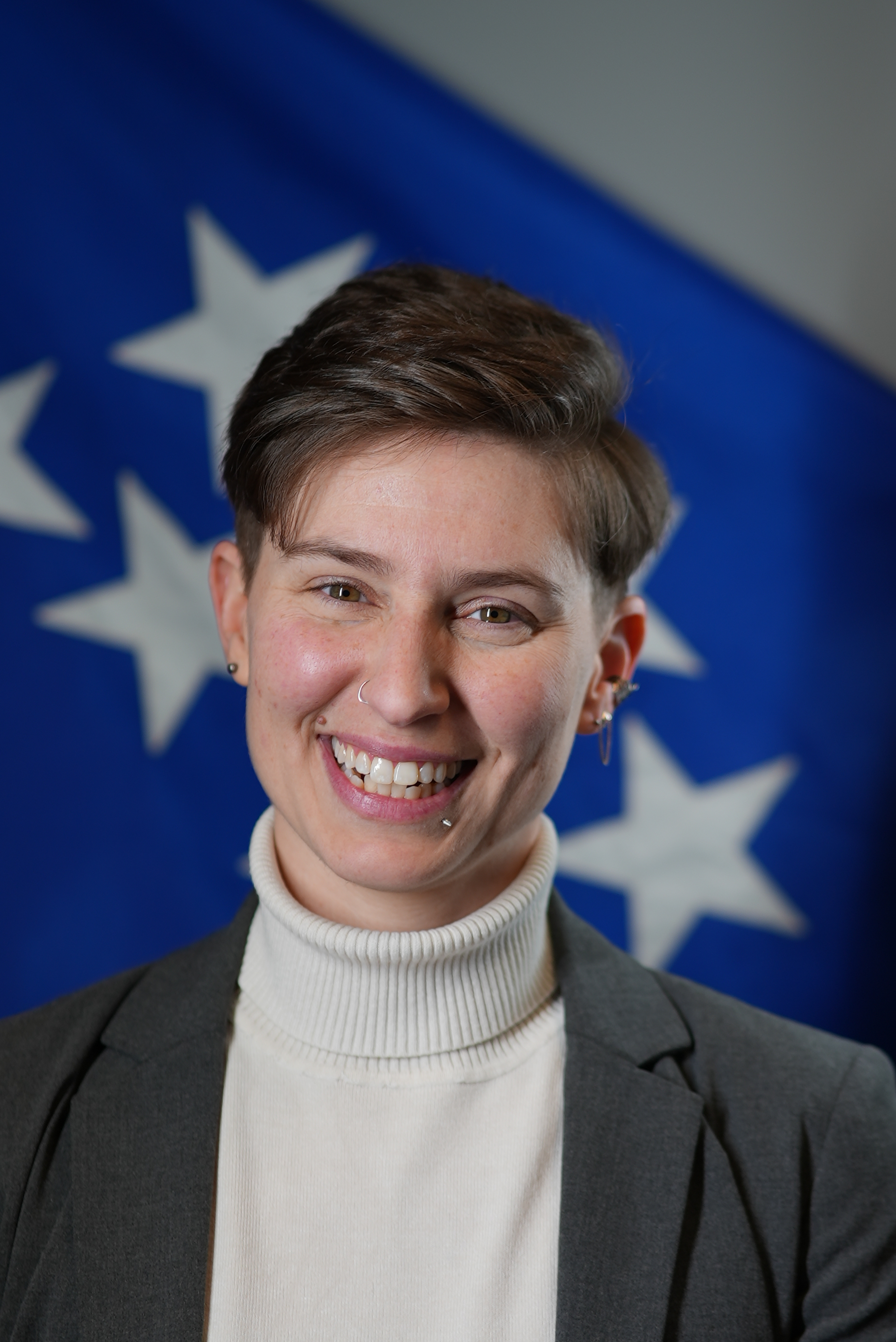

Durham City Council Member for Ward 3
- Incumbent
- Assumed office January 2024
- Preceded by: Leonardo Williams

Personal details
- Party: Democratic
- Education: University of North Carolina at Chapel Hill (BA); Stanford University (JD)
- Occupation: Attorney; Politician; Professor
- Website: Council Website

Chelsea Cook is an American attorney and politician. In 2024, she was appointed to the Durham City Council, representing Ward 3. She was reelected to the council in 2025. Cook serves on faculty at Duke University as assistant clinical professor of law and supervising attorney of the Duke Civil Justice Clinic.

== Education ==
Cook earned a Bachelor of Arts degree in public policy and women's studies from the University of North Carolina at Chapel Hill and a Juris Doctor degree from Stanford Law School.

== Career ==
Cook is an attorney and has worked as a legal aid for North Carolina's Durham Eviction Diversion Program.

In January 2024, Cook was appointed to the Durham City Council to fill the Ward 3 seat left vacant by Mayor Leonardo Williams. She received votes from council members DeDreana Freeman, Javiera Caballero, and Carl Rist. Her opponent, Shelia Huggins, received votes from Williams, Mayor Pro Tempore Mark-Anthony Middleton, and Councilman Nate Baker. The vote initially resulted in a tie, until Baker switched his vote to Cook. Following Baker's vote, the remaining two votes were changed and Cook was voted in unanimously.

She serves on the council's Affordable Housing Implementation Committee, the Durham Arts Council, Durham Open Space & Trails, the Homeless Services Advisory Committee, the Housing Appeals Board, the Human Relations Commission, the Mayor's Committee for Persons with Disabilities, and the Museum of Life and Science.

In February 2024, Cook called on the Biden Administration to facilitate a ceasefire between Israel and Palestine in the Gaza war. She proposed a resolution for President Biden to facilitate the entry of humanitarian aid into Gaza and advocated for the release of Israeli hostages.

In September 2024, Cook responded to complaints made by real estate developers about tree coverage standards raising project costs, stating that destruction of the environment has "real consequences." In October 2024, Cook was one of two council members that voted against a rezoning and development project for Duke University's central campus. She supports the Coalition to End the HIV Epidemic in Durham.

In July 2025, Cook joined the faculty at Duke University School of Law as an assistant clinical professor of law and as a supervising attorney at the Duke Civil Justice Clinic. In September 2025, Cook sought reelection to the city council. She retained her seat on the council, defeating Diana Medoff in the election.

== Personal life ==
Cook is Jewish.
