= Zwelibanzi Moyo Williams =

Zimbabwean-American chef and restauranteur

First Lady of Durham, North Carolina
- Incumbent
- Assumed role December 4, 2023
- Mayor: Leonardo Williams
- Preceded by: vacant

Personal details
- Born: Zwelibanzi Moyo; 1977 (age 48–49) Matabeleland, Rhodesia
- Party: Democratic
- Spouse: Leonardo Williams
- Children: 1
- Education: North Carolina Central University
- Occupation: chef

Zwelibanzi "Zweli" Moyo Williams (born 1977) is a Zimbabwean-American chef and restaurateur. She specializes in Southern African cuisine and opened multiple restaurants in Durham, North Carolina. As the wife of Mayor Leonardo Williams, she has been the First Lady of Durham since 2023.

== Early life and education ==
Williams was born in 1977 in the Matabeleland region of Rhodesia (now Zimbabwe) and spent part of her childhood in Bulawayo during the Rhodesian Bush War. She is the third of four children. Her parents belonged to opposing ethnic groups and later divorced, at which time she lived with her mother. When she was two years old, her father kidnapped her and brought her to Plumtree to place her in the care of his mother. During this time, she was raped, abused, and suffered from homelessness and malnutrition until she was reunited with her mother five years later.

In 1999, she followed her sister, Tiny Moyo Norris, to the United States to study hospitality and tourism management at North Carolina Central University in Durham, North Carolina. Her visa expired and she was kicked out of school, ultimately returning and graduating in 2003.

== Career ==
After graduating from college, Williams worked at restaurants and fitness centers around the Research Triangle.

In 2016, she founded Zweli's Catering, serving clients including Google, Duke University, and the University of North Carolina at Chapel Hill. She founded Zweli's Piri Piri Kitchen, which was reportedly the first-known Zimbabwean restaurant in the United States. In 2018, she and her husband opened Zweli's Kitchen along Durham-Chapel Hill Boulevard and, in 2021, they opened Zweli's Café, a satellite location, on the campus of Duke University. Her restaurants focus on Southern African cuisine, especially Bantu cuisine.

In 2021, she was named Best Chef in Durham County by INDY Week. That same year, she gave the keynote address at Eta Sigma Delta's induction ceremony for students of North Carolina Central University's Hospitality and Tourism Administration Program and Durham Technical Community College’s Hospitality Management Program.

In 2022, she and her husband opened Zweli's Ekhaya in Durham's American Tobacco Historic District.

Jill Biden greeting representatives of North Carolina in Raleigh, including Durham Mayor Leonardo Williams and his wife Zweli Williams (center) in 2024

=== Politics and public life ===
Williams and her husband were active in the 2020 Biden campaign and attended the U.S. presidential debate at Belmont University in Nashville, Tennessee as special guests of Joe Biden.

In 2023, her husband was elected as Mayor of Durham, at which time she became the city's first lady. In March 2024, she met with U.S. First Lady Jill Biden.

== Personal life ==
She met Leonardo Williams while the two were students at North Carolina Central University. They later married. She has one son, Izaiah, from a previous marriage.
