= Leonardo Williams =

American restaurateur and politician

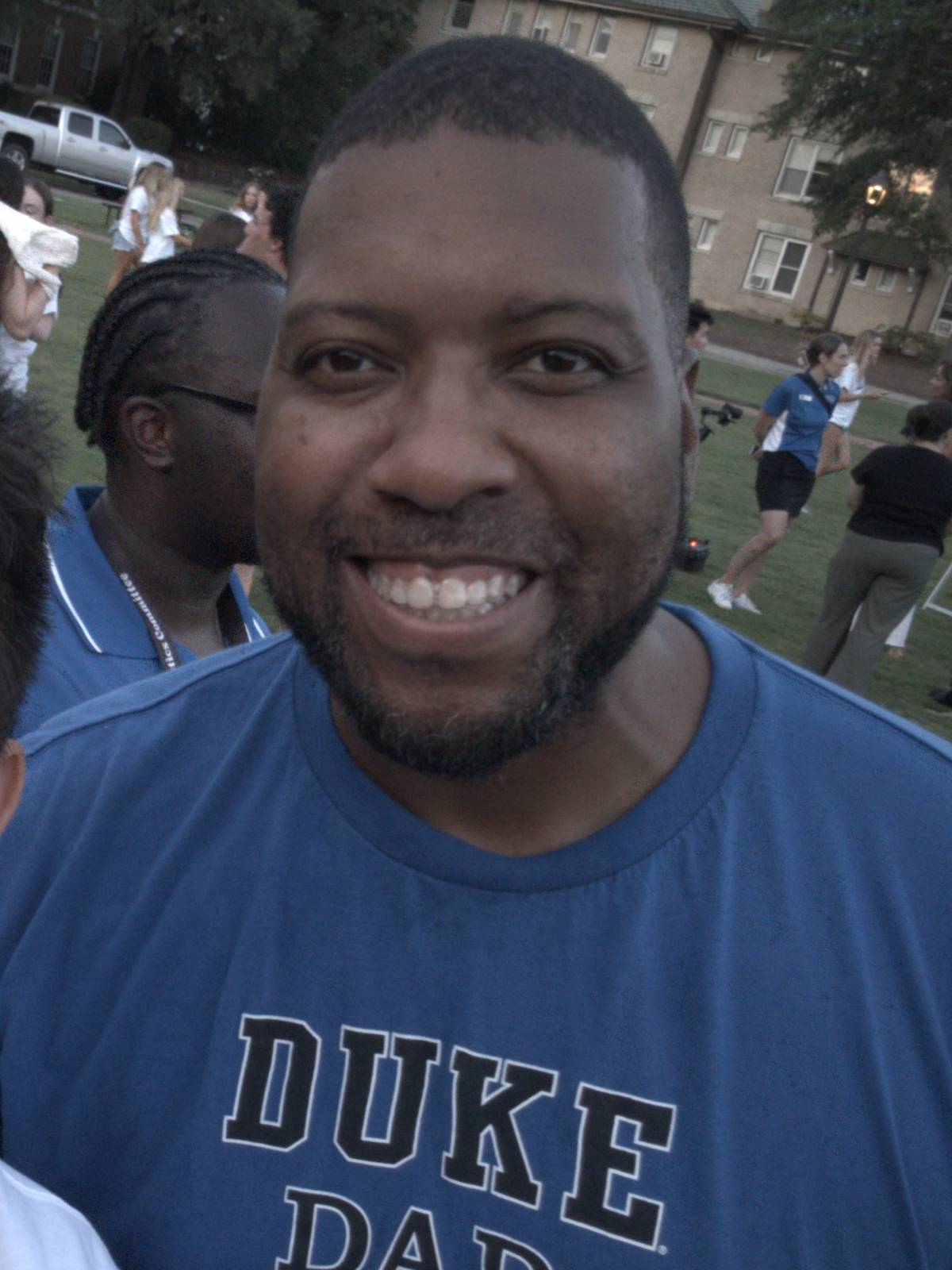
- Williams in 2025

Mayor of Durham, North Carolina
- Incumbent
- Assumed office December 4, 2023
- Preceded by: Elaine O'Neal

Durham City Council Member for Ward 3
- In office 2021–2023
- Preceded by: Pierce Freelon
- Succeeded by: Chelsea Cook

Personal details
- Born: 1980 or 1981
- Party: Democratic (current); Independent (former)
- Spouse: Zwelibanzi Moyo
- Children: 1
- Education: North Carolina Central University (BA, MA)
- Occupation: Businessman, politician, teacher, school administrator
- Website: leo4durham.com

Leonardo Williams (born 1980 or 1981) is an American politician, restaurateur, and former educator. He has served as the mayor of Durham, North Carolina since December 4, 2023. Prior to his term as mayor, Williams was a member of the Durham City Council. He and his wife, Zwelibanzi Moyo Williams, own multiple restaurants in Durham including the first full-service Zimbabwean restaurant in the United States.

== Early life and education ==
Williams was born in 1980 or 1981. He grew up in Halifax County, North Carolina. His mother, Yolanda Bailey, served on the board of the North Carolina Teachers Association, the predecessor to the North Carolina Association of Educators.

He graduated with a bachelor's degree in music education and education psychology and a master's degree in educational leadership from North Carolina Central University. While a student at Central, Williams served as the North Carolina Central Eagles drum major.

== Career ==
=== Politics ===
Williams served on the board of the Durham Association of Educators from 2008 to 2010. Although he described himself as a committed Democrat, he registered as an Independent during his time on the board so that Republicans would "pick up [his] calls." In 2020, he was active on the Biden presidential campaign and attended the presidential debate in Nashville, Tennessee as a special guest of Joe Biden.

Williams represented Ward 3 as a member of the Durham City Council from 2021 to 2023. According to a story published by Indy Week, Williams and Mayor Elaine O'Neal were both allegedly punched by Councilwoman DeDreana Freeman on March 23, 2023, when trying to restrain her during an argument between Freeman and Mayor Pro Tempore Mark-Anthony Middleton in the council chambers.

He won the 2023 Durham mayoral election and assumed office on December 4. He is one of the youngest mayors in Durham's history. He received endorsements from the People’s Alliance, the Durham Committee on the Affairs of Black People, and Friends of Durham PACs.

Williams was reelected for a second two-year term in 2025.

=== Education and business ===
Williams worked as a school teacher and school administrator. He also served as the band director at Southern High School. He was twice recognized by Durham Public Schools as teacher of the year and was recognized by Triangle Business Journal as one of their "40 under 40" for innovative practices in education.

Williams and his wife opened Zweli's in 2018, a Zimbabwean restaurant in Durham named after his wife. The restaurant is the first full-service Zimbabwean restaurant in the United States. The couple later opened Ekhaya in the American Tobacco Campus in 2022, serving Bantu-inspired tapas.

== Personal life ==
Williams is married to Zwelibanzi Moyo Williams, a chef whom he met in college. He is the stepfather of her son, Izaiah.

In December 2025, a former Southern High School student accused Williams of showing him an inappropriate video as a teacher. Williams denied the allegation.
