= Steve Schewel =

American politician, businessman, and academic

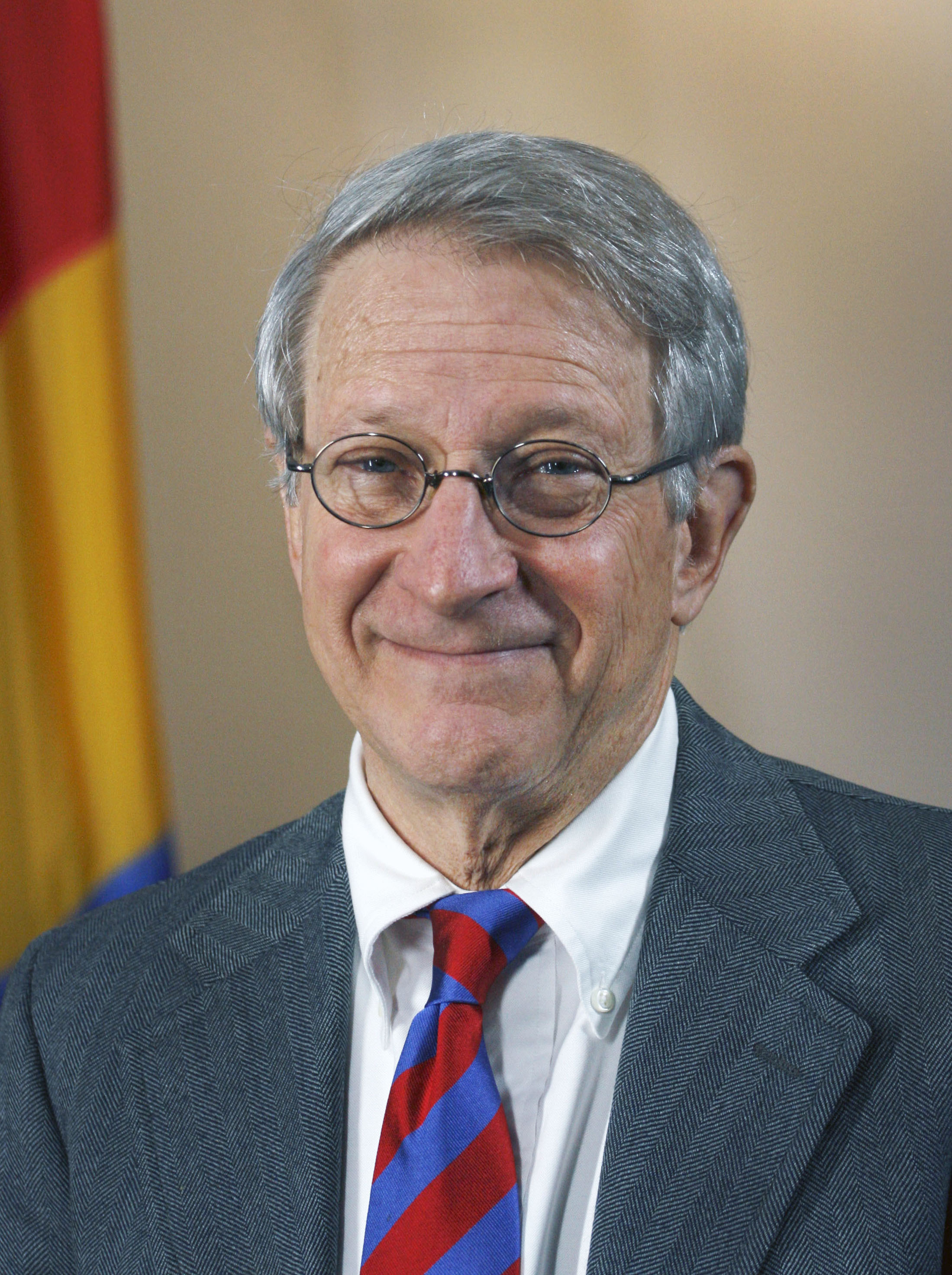

Mayor of Durham, North Carolina
- In office December 4, 2017 – December 2021
- Preceded by: Bill Bell
- Succeeded by: Elaine O'Neal

Member of Durham City Council
- In office 2011–2017

Vice Chair of the Durham Public School Board
- In office 2004–2008

Personal details
- Born: 1951 (age 74–75) Lynchburg, Virginia, U.S.
- Party: Democratic
- Spouse: Lao Rubert
- Children: 2
- Education: Duke University (BA); Columbia University (MA); Duke University (PhD)
- Profession: Politician; academic; businessman

Stephen M. Schewel (born 1951) is an American politician, businessman, and academic. A Democrat, he is the former Mayor of Durham, North Carolina and formerly served on the Durham City Council and as the Vice Chair of the Durham Public School Board. Schewel is also a faculty member at Duke University's Sanford School of Public Policy and a former faculty member at North Carolina Central University. He founded the weekly newspaper Indy Week in 1983, and served as its president until he sold the paper in 2012. In 2010 he co-founded the Hopscotch Music Festival.

== Early life and education ==
Schewel grew up in Lynchburg, Virginia. He moved to North Carolina in 1969 to attend Duke University. While an undergraduate student, Schewel served as the president of the Associated Students of Duke University. In this capacity, he granted the charter to Duke's first LGBTQ student organization in 1973. He graduated magna cum laude from Duke in 1973. He earned a master's degree in English from Columbia University in 1974, and a Ph.D. in education from Duke in 1982.

== Career ==
=== Business and academia ===
In 1983 Schewel founded the newspaper North Carolina Independent, later renamed Indy Week. Schewel personally wrote the state's first same-sex marriage announcement in the paper. Schewel stepped down as the paper's publisher in 1999, but continued on as president of the company until he sold it in 2012. He is also a co-founder of the Hopscotch Music Festival, which he sold in 2015.

Schewel is a visiting assistant professor at Duke University's Sanford School of Public Policy. He is also a former Durham Public Schools board of education member and former English instructor at North Carolina Central University.

=== Politics ===
From 2004 to 2008 Schewel was a member, and vice-chair, of the Durham Public Schools Board of Education. He was elected to the Durham City Council in 2011 and served until 2017. While serving on the city council, Schewel was an outspoken critic of North Carolina Amendment 1 and introduced a city resolution to support same-sex marriage. He and his wife hosted a fundraiser at their home, raising over $200,000 to assist organizations fighting against the amendment.

==== Durham mayor ====
Schewel was elected mayor of Durham on November 7, 2017. He was sworn in on December 4, succeeding the retiring Bill Bell. Schewel spoke in favor of gun control and environmental regulations.

On May 5, 2018, Schewel presided over the Jewish Baccalaureate Service at Duke University. In 2018 he participated in Michael Bloomberg's Harvard City Leadership Initiative.

In April 2019 Schewel joined local business leaders and the city's fire chief to address the state of industry in Durham after the 2019 Durham gas explosion, which affected multiple local businesses in the Bright Leaf Historic District. Schewel had arrived on the scene shortly after the explosion took place.

Schewel proposed a $95 million housing bond in 2019.

Schewel was reelected mayor of Durham with 83.4 percent of the vote in 2019.

In January 2020 Schewel stated that the city intends to help fund the mitigation of carbon monoxide issues at McDougald Terrace, a public housing complex in Durham that had to evacuate its residents due to a carbon monoxide leak.

In February 2020 Schewel, who is Jewish, was criticized by Jewish residents of Durham and neighboring municipalities for supporting a municipal resolution banning police training in Israel for Durham police officers. Schewel banned the program after left-wing and pro-Palestinian groups alleged that the program provided military-style training and encouraged racial violence against African-American communities. The ban, approved in April 2018, forbids members of the Durham Police Department from engaging in international training exchanges where officers could receive "military-like training". The ban was first in the United States to prevent a city's police department from engaging in international training.

On March 13, 2020, Schewel declared a state of emergency for the city of Durham, which was set to expire on March 28. The declaration was in response to the COVID-19 pandemic in the United States, and prohibited groups of 100 people or more to meet. On March 25, 2020, Schewel declared a stay at home order for the city. The order was put in place March 26, 2020, at 6:00 pm and was issued to last until April 30, 2020. The order banned individuals in Durham from traveling, going out in public, and prevents gatherings of more than 10 people, with some exceptions. The order closed non-essential businesses but encouraged employees to work from home.

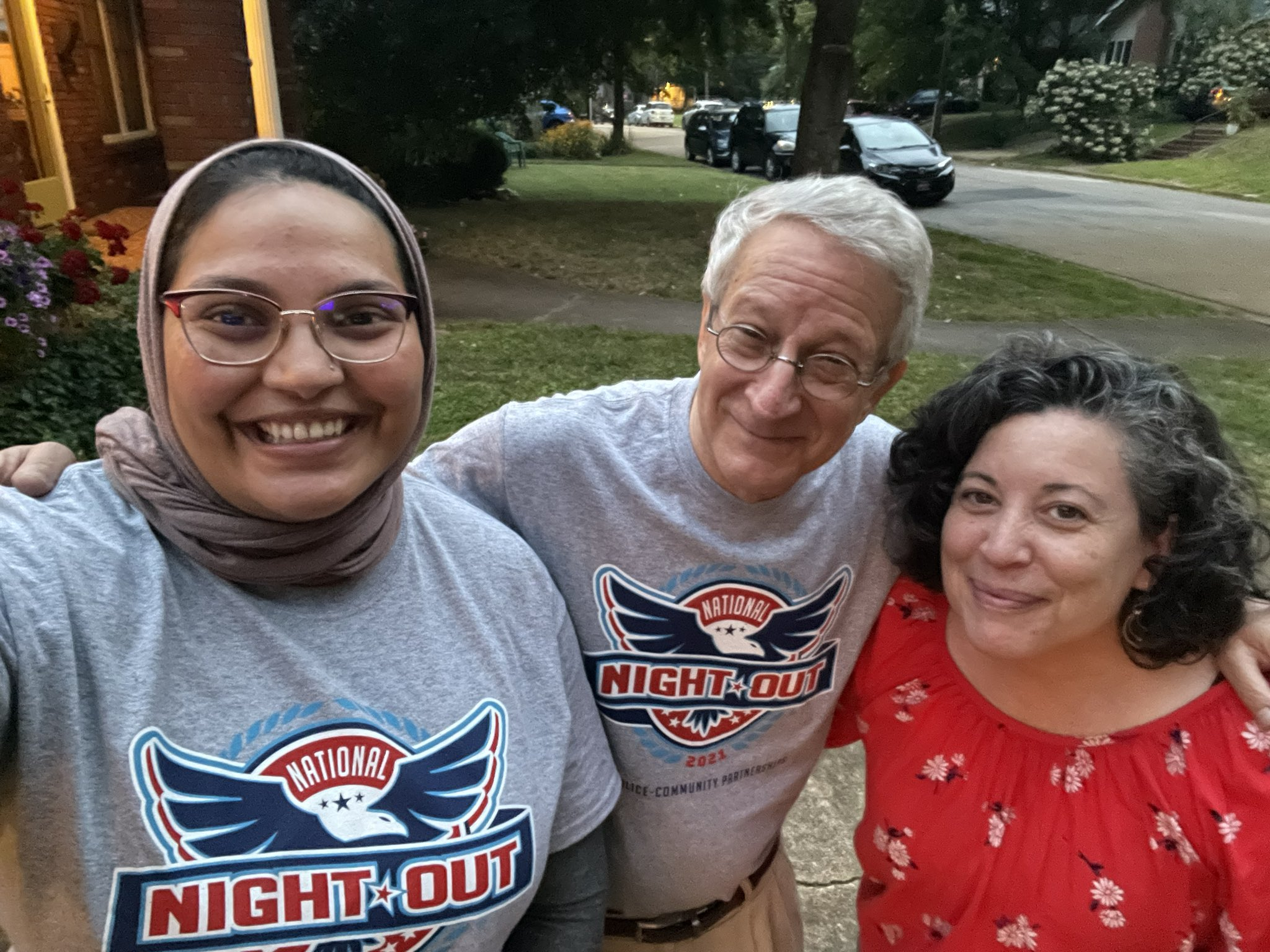
Schewel (middle) with Durham County Commissioner Nida Allam (left) and Durham City Councilwoman Javiera Caballero at National Night Out in 2021.

In April 2020 Schewel, alongside Durham County Board of Commissioners chairwoman Wendy Jacobs, Durham County Commissioner Heidi Carter, Durham City Council members Javiera Caballero, Jillian Johnson, Mark-Anthony Middleton, and Charlie Reece, and Raleigh City Council members Nicole Stewart and Saige Martin, pledged to take part in the #ShareYourCheck Challenge. They pledged all or part of their federal stimulus payments, part of an aid package to help Americans through the COVID-19 recession onset by the COVID-19 pandemic, to go to Siembra Solidarity Fund. The fund helped undocumented residents who were shut out of financial assistance due to their immigration status.

On May 27, 2021, Schewel announced that he would not seek a third term as mayor. In June of that month, Schewel was one of 11 U.S. mayors to form Mayors Organized for Reparations and Equity (MORE), a coalition of municipal leaders dedicated to starting pilot reparations programs in their cities.

Schewel left office on December 6, 2021, succeeded as mayor of Durham by Elaine O'Neal.

== Personal life ==
Schewel is Jewish and attends Judea Reform Congregation.

He is married to Lao Rubert, the former executive director of the Carolina Justice Policy Center. They have two sons and live in Durham. He has coached soccer for middle schools and high schools in Durham. Schewel likes to run in his free time.

Schewel has served on as the chair of the Durham Tech Community Foundation and has served on the boards of the Durham Public Education Network, the Durham Arts Council, the Blue Ribbon Commission for the Future of Durham High School, and Urban Ministries of Durham. He also served on the community advisory boards for WNCU and WUNC radio stations.
