= Mark-Anthony Middleton =

American politician and pastor

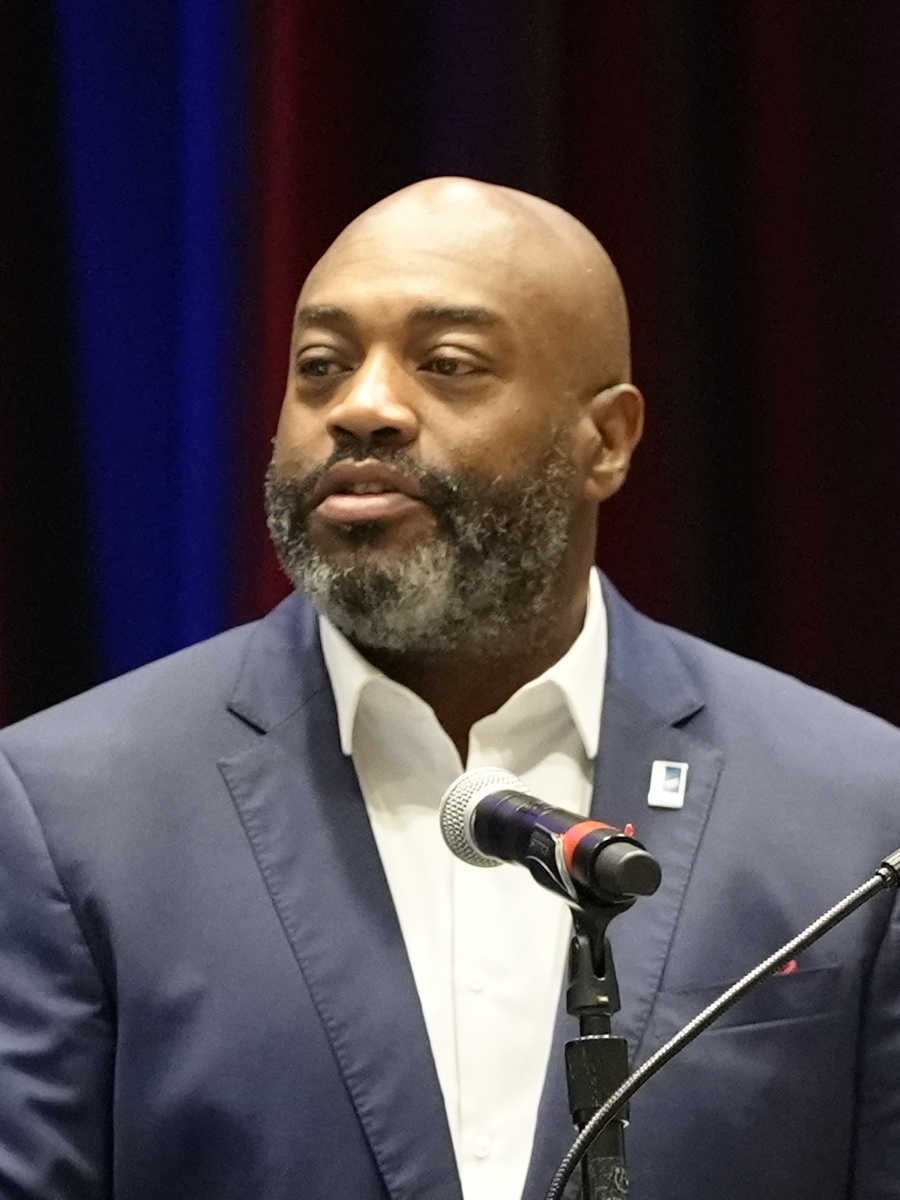
- Middleton in 2024

Mayor Pro Tempore of Durham, North Carolina
- In office 2021–2025
- Preceded by: Jillian Johnson
- Succeeded by: Javiera Caballero

Durham City Councilman for Ward 2
- In office 2017–2025
- Succeeded by: Shanetta Burris

Personal details
- Party: Democratic
- Occupation: politician, pastor

Mark-Anthony Middleton is an American politician and Protestant minister. He was a member of the Durham City Council from 2017 to 2025 and served as Mayor Pro Tempore of Durham from 2021 to 2025.

== Career ==
=== Ministry ===
Williams is the senior pastor and CEO of Abundant Hope Christian Church, an African-American Protestant congregation in Durham.

=== Politics ===
Middleton was elected to the Durham City Council in 2017. He represents Ward 2. In 2020, he proposed a pilot program that would give a universal basic income to the city's poorest residents. The proposal suggested a twelve to eighteen-month experiment that would provide 200-300 residents with up to $1,000 a month in income. Middleton argued that the program would help reduce other issues in the city, especially gun violence. Williams supported a non-discrimination ordinance protecting LGBTQ residents and supported the Crown Act, protecting women of color in the workplace. He called for the hiring, training, and deploying of unarmed mental health responders to assist with crisis response.

In 2021, he was appointed as Mayor Pro Tempore.

On March 23, 2023, Councilwoman DeDreana Freeman accused Middleton of bullying black women during an extortion investigation into Councilwoman Monique Holsey-Hyman. Middleton and Freeman argued in a room outside of the council chamber and, according to Indy Week, Freeman attempted to punch Middleton, instead hitting Mayor Elaine O'Neal and Councilman Leonardo Williams, who were attempting to restrain her.

Despite speculation, Middleton announced that he would not be running for Mayor of Durham in the 2023 election.

He served as president of the NC League of Municipalities until 2025 and, prior to his presidency, he served on the league's board of directors.

In November 2025, he lost his re-election bid to Shanetta Burris.
