= North Carolina Central University School of Law =

Historically black law school in Durham, North Carolina, US

Coordinates: 35.9718°N 78.8956°W

- Motto: Truth and Service
- Parent school: North Carolina Central University
- Established: 1939
- School type: Public, HBCU
- Dean: Joseph K. Grant
- Location: Durham, North Carolina, U.S.
- Enrollment: 364 (full-time), 212 (part-time)
- Faculty: 30 (full-time), 74 (total)
- USNWR ranking: 178-195 out of 195 (2025)
- Bar pass rate: 73.9% (July 2019 first-time takers)
- Website: law.nccu.edu

The North Carolina Central University School of Law (also known as NCCU School of Law or NCCU Law) is the law school of North Carolina Central University. The school is fully accredited by the American Bar Association (ABA) and the North Carolina State Bar Council, and is a member of the Association of American Law Schools (AALS). According to NC Central's official 2018 ABA-required disclosures, 37.9% of the Class of 2018 obtained full-time, long-term, JD-required employment nine months after graduation.

== Admissions ==
The North Carolina Central University School of Law tightened the admission practices by imposing a minimum LSAT score on future applications in response to the American Bar Association's December 2017 query about its admission standards. Applicants must score at least 142 on the LSAT to be eligible for NCCU School of Law admission.

== Academics ==
The school offers a full-time day program and a part-time evening program. Full-time professors and clinical instructors, including 28 women and 28 minorities, work with a number of adjunct and visiting professors to teach approximately 576 students in both programs.

The school offers the Juris Doctor as well as two joint degrees—the Juris Doctor/Master of Business Administration (J.D./M.B.A.) and the Juris Doctor/Master of Library Science (J.D./M.L.S.).

In 2007, the law school launched a Civil Rights and Constitutional Law Concentration for students interested in developing a deeper understanding of civil rights law and history. There are four additional certificate programs available: Biotechnology and Pharmaceutical Law, Dispute Resolution, Tax Law, and Justice in the Practice of Law.

In 2012, the school launched its Maritime Law Summer program with the University of North Carolina at Wilmington. The program offers students a unique opportunity to complete coursework in admiralty law and coastal policy from practitioners and experts in both fields.

== History ==
The North Carolina General Assembly enacted House Bill 18 on March 1, 1939, authorizing a law school at North Carolina College for Negroes (now known as North Carolina Central University). The only previous school open to blacks in the state had been at Shaw University, in Raleigh, which closed its law school in 1914, leaving no in-state option for blacks to receive a formal education in law. The legislation was intended to create a separate-but-equal option for blacks who wanted to become lawyers, without integrating the law school at the University of North Carolina at Chapel Hill. The Bill authorized the Board of Trustees to establish the North Carolina College for Negroes Law School and announced it would open in the fall of 1939. Due to the amount of time the college had to prepare and advertise the law school, only one student registered, resulting in the administration delaying the opening to the following year.

== Facilities ==
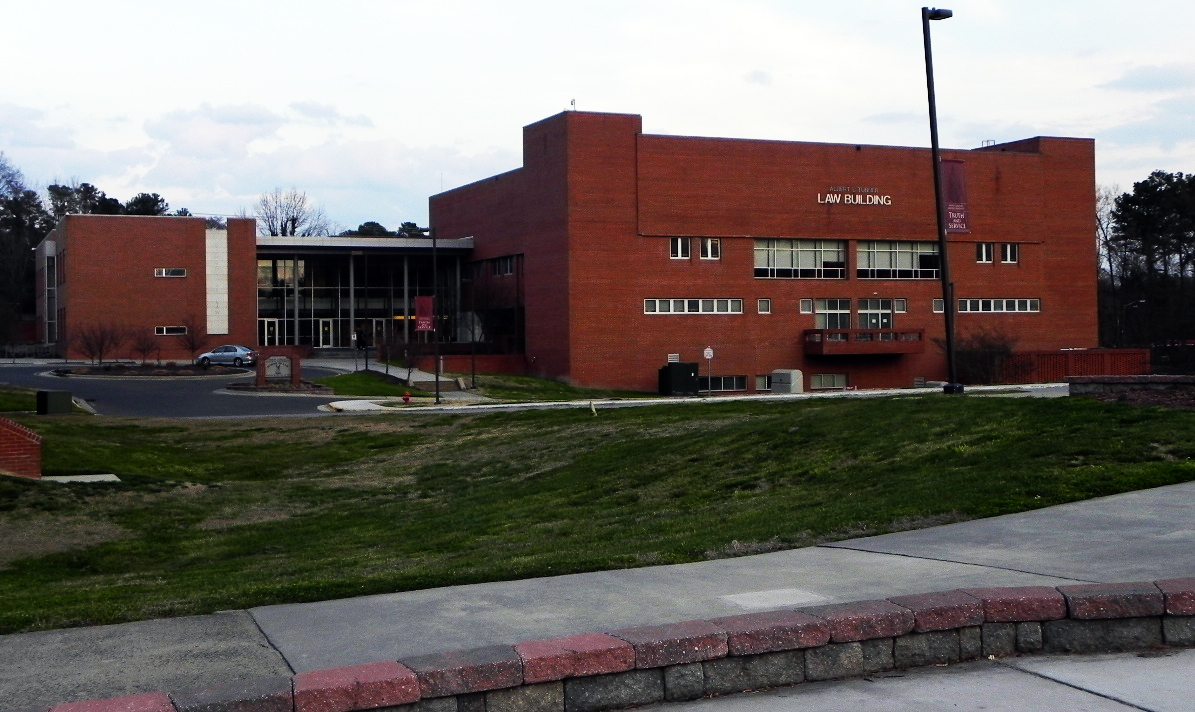
NCCU School of Law building

The school is located in Durham, North Carolina on the campus of NCCU in the Albert L. Turner Building. The Turner Building is an 87,672 sq. ft. four-story brick structure that contains moot courtrooms, a model law office, classrooms, and an administrative wing. The Turner Building has six high-tech smart classrooms, two distance learning classrooms, and two high tech smart seminar rooms.

The NCCU Law Library contains over 400,000 volumes and volume equivalents, and provides an environment for study and research. The ground floor of the building contains individual offices for student organizations, a student lounge, and canteen/vending area. There is a fully equipped computer lab and wireless internet throughout the building. The Great Hall, an atrium located on the first floor, allows the School of Law to comfortably host workshops, other seminars and special events.

== Technology ==
In the fall of 2010, the school received approximately $2 million in funding from the U.S. Commerce Department's National Telecommunications and Information Administration (NTIA) to expand broadband infrastructure and deliver legal services throughout the state.

Technology Assisted Legal Instruction and Services (TALIAS) expands access to the school's legal education and clinical programs. It employs a fully immersive telepresence environment for both undergraduate courses and legal assistance at four Historically Black Colleges and Universities – Elizabeth City State University, Fayetteville State University, North Carolina Agricultural and Technical State University, and Winston-Salem State University.

== Clinics ==
NCCU School of Law supports the following:

- Alternative Dispute Resolution Clinic
- Civil Litigation Clinic
- Criminal Defense Clinic
- Criminal Prosecution Externship
- Domestic Violence Clinic
- Family Law Clinic
- General Externship
- Juvenile Law Clinic
- Low Income Taxpayer Clinic
- Public Interest Externship
- Small Business and Community Development Clinic
- Street law Clinic
- Veterans Law Clinic

== Institutes ==
=== Biotechnology and Pharmaceutical Law Institute ===
The Biotechnology and Pharmaceutical Law Institute has been established as a center of excellence in the field of biotechnology and pharmaceutical law, with a multidisciplinary approach in teaching, research and publications. Its mission is to make substantial contributions to the development of global biotechnology and pharmaceutical law and to the investigation and examination of contemporary issues in U.S. regulatory affairs issues.

=== Dispute Resolution Institute ===
The Dispute Resolution Institute is intended to provide training in alternative dispute resolution.

== Journals ==
=== North Carolina Central Law Review ===
Established in 1967, the North Carolina Central Law Journal, changed its name to the North Carolina Central Law Review in the spring of 2007. The Law Review contains articles written by legal scholars, judges, practitioners and academics.

=== Biotechnology and Pharmaceutical Law Review ===
Established in 2006, the Biotechnology and Pharmaceutical Law Review seeks to publish a professional periodical devoted to these areas that are useful to judges, practitioners, teachers, legislators, students and others interested in these practice areas.

== Leadership ==
Joseph Karl Grant was named dean in April of 2026. Donald W. Corbett served as interim dean from July of 2025 to July of 2026. The former deans of NCCU School of Law are:

- Maurice T. Van Hecke, 1939–1942
- Albert L. Turner, 1942–1965
- Daniel G. Sampson, 1965–1969
- LeMarquis DeJarmon, 1969–1976
- Harry E. Groves, 1976–1981
- Charles E. Daye, 1981–1985
- Thomas M. Ringer, 1985–1986
- Louis Westerfield, 1986–1990
- Mary E. Wright, 1990–1994
- Percy R. Luney, Jr., 1994–1998
- Janice L. Mills, 1998–2005
- Raymond C. Pierce, 2005–2012
- Phyliss Craig-Taylor, 2012–2018
- Elaine O’Neal, 2018–2020
- Browne C. Lewis, 2020–2023
- Patricia Timmons-Goodson, 2023–2025

== Notable alumni ==
- Wanda G. Bryant (1982), first African-American woman to be an assistant district attorney in the 13th prosecutorial district of North Carolina; associate judge on the North Carolina Court of Appeals
- George Kenneth "G. K." Butterfield, Jr. (1974), U.S. representative for North Carolina's 1st congressional district 2004–2022
- Michael F. Easley (1976), first NCCU Law alumnus to serve as attorney general and governor of North Carolina
- Stormie Forte (2002), first African-American woman and first openly LGBTQ woman to serve on the Raleigh City Council
- Willie Gary (1974), trial lawyer portrayed by Jamie Foxx in The Burial
- Robert D. Glass (1951), first African-American to serve as a justice of the Connecticut Supreme Court
- Maynard Jackson (1963), first African-American mayor of Atlanta in 1974; at age 35, he was the youngest person to be elected to the office
- Clifton E. Johnson (1967), first African-American assistant state prosecutor for North Carolina since the 19th century (1969), first African-American district court judge in North Carolina, first African-American chief district court judge, first African-American resident superior court judge for North Carolina; first African-American to be appointed to the North Carolina Court of Appeals; senior associate judge; first African-American chairman of the North Carolina Judicial Standards Commission
- Leroy R. Johnson (1957), first African-American member of the Georgia State Senate since reconstruction; first African-American lawyer in the southeast to be employed on the U.S. district attorney's staff in Atlanta; first African-American to head a legislative delegation; first African-American to be named chairman of a standing committee in the Georgia General Assembly
- Floyd B. McKissick, Sr. (1951), national executive director of the Congress of Racial Equality; in 1972, he launched Soul City, North Carolina, the first new town sponsored primarily by African-American enterprise
- H.M. "Mickey" Michaux, Jr. (1964), first African-American in the 20th century to serve as a U.S. attorney in the South; member of the North Carolina General Assembly; upon his retirement, he was its longest-serving member; the NCCU School of Education building was named after him on June 15, 2007
- Elaine O'Neal, first African-American woman to be mayor of Durham, former North Carolina Superior Court judge
- Marshall Pitts Jr. (1990), mayor of Fayetteville, North Carolina (2001–2005)

== Rankings ==
In 2025, the school was ranked 178-195th out of 195 schools (the lowest bracket) by U.S. News & World Report.

== Employment ==
According to NC Central's official 2018 ABA-required disclosures, 37.9% of the Class of 2018 obtained full-time, long-term, JD-required employment nine months after graduation. NCCU's Law School Transparency under-employment score is 31.8%, indicating the percentage of the Class of 2018 unemployed, pursuing an additional degree, or working in a non-professional, short-term, or part-time job nine months after graduation.

ABA employment summary for 2018 graduates
Employment status	Percentage
Employed – Bar passage required (full-time, long-term)	37.9%
Employed – Bar passage required (part-time and/or short-term)	5.3%
Employed – J.D. advantage	18.9%
Employed – professional position	10.6%
Employed – non-professional position	4.5%
Pursuing graduate degree full-time	2.3%
Unemployed – start date deferred	3.0%
Unemployed – not seeking	1.5%
Unemployed – seeking	9.8%
Employment status unknown	6.1%
Total of 132 graduates

== Costs ==
For 2021, tuition was full-time $13,544 (in-state), full-time $36,116 (out-of-state), part-time $10,084 (in-state), and part-time $27,088 (out-of-state). The total cost of attendance (indicating the cost of tuition, fees, and living expenses) for the 2013–2014 academic year was $43,915. The Law School Transparency estimated debt-financed cost of attendance for three years is $116,984 for residents and $169,249 for non-residents.
