= Browne C. Lewis =

American law school dean (c. 1962–2022)

Browne Cornell Lewis (c. 1962 – June 3, 2022) was a legal scholar who served as dean of North Carolina Central University School of Law from 2020 to 2022.

Born in Natchez, Louisiana, Lewis was "one of 12 children from a family in a small country town". She received a bachelor's degree in political science from Grambling State University, followed by a master's degree in public policy from the Humphrey School of Public Affairs at the University of Minnesota, and then a J.D. from the University of Minnesota Law School in 1988, followed by an LL.M. in energy and environmental law from the University of Houston Law Center in 1997. In 2013, she published the book, Papa's Baby: Paternity and Artificial Insemination. She taught at the Cleveland–Marshall College of Law prior to becoming dean at North Carolina Central University School of Law.

Lewis led North Carolina Central University School of Law through it reaccreditation process with the American Bar Association in 2020. In 2021, Intel gave a $5 million grant for the school in support of the development of a technology and policy center, which Lewis expressed was a goal of her tenure.

Lewis died in Colorado at the age of 60, while attending the annual conference of the Law School Admission Council, of which she was a member.
