= Golden Belt Historic District =

Historic district in North Carolina, United States

- U.S. National Register of Historic Places
- U.S. Historic district
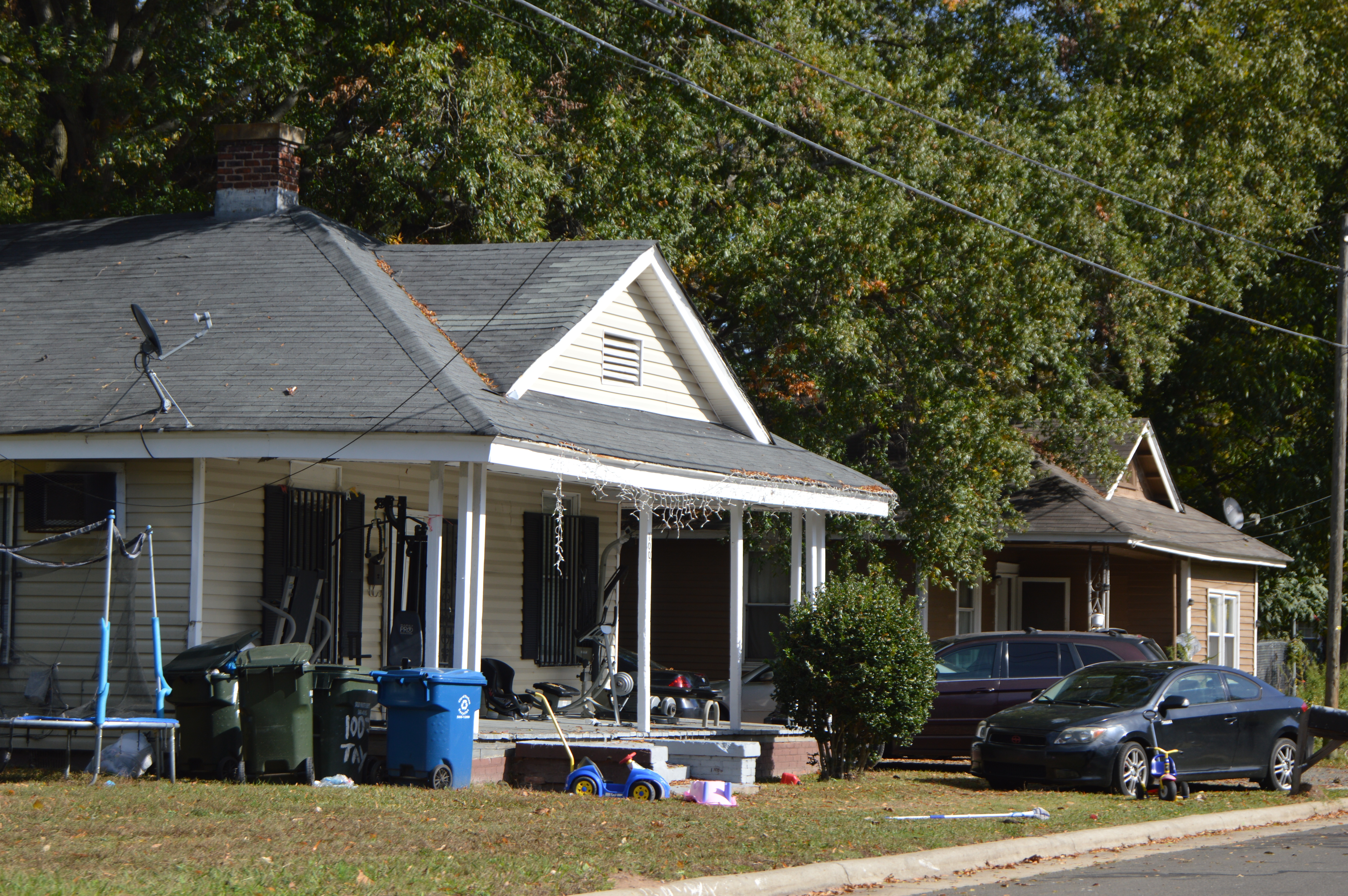
- Taylor Street houses

- Location within North Carolina Location within the United States
- Location: Roughly bounded by N & W RR, Taylor, Holman Sts., Morning Glory Ave. and Main St.; also 1000-1004 E. Main St., Durham, North Carolina
- Coordinates: 35°59′26″N 78°53′20″W
- Area: 38.7 acres (15.7 ha)
- Built: 1901
- Architect: Mitchell, Andrew C.; Multiple
- Architectural style: Romanesque, Bungalow/craftsman, Classical Revival
- MPS: Durham MRA
- NRHP reference No.: 85001791, 96000816 (Boundary Increase)
- Added to NRHP: August 9, 1985, July 30, 1996 (Boundary Increase)

Golden Belt Historic District is a national historic district located at Durham, Durham County, North Carolina. The district encompasses 116 contributing buildings in a mixed industrial, commercial, and residential section of Durham. The focus of the district are the Romanesque Revival style buildings associated with the Golden Belt Manufacturing Company plant. Associated with the company are 109 worker's houses built in 1900-1902 and bungalows built in the late 1910s.

It was listed on the National Register of Historic Places in 1985, with a boundary increase in 1996.

== Notable residents ==
- DeDreana Freeman, Durham City Councilwoman
