= DeDreana Freeman =

American politician (born 1977)

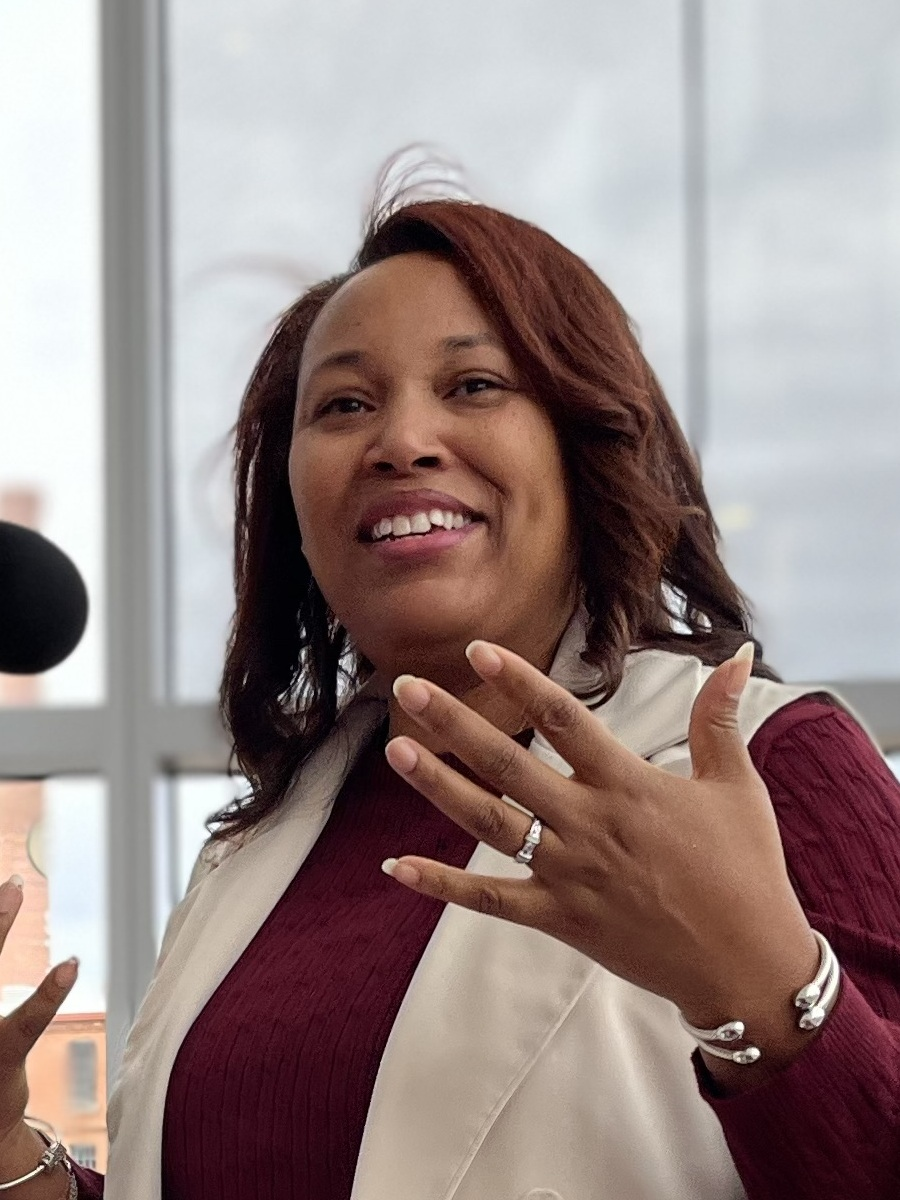
- Freeman in 2025

Member of the Durham City Council for the 1st ward
- In office December 4, 2017 – December 1, 2025
- Preceded by: Cora Cole-McFadden
- Succeeded by: Matt Kopac

Personal details
- Born: DeDreana Irene Harris; September 30, 1977 (age 49) Trenton, New Jersey, U.S.
- Party: Democratic
- Spouse: Antoine B. Freeman
- Children: 3
- Education: Rutgers University (BA); North Carolina Central University (MA)
- Occupation: Politician non-profit executive
- Website: dedreanafreeman.com

DeDreana Irene Freeman (born September 30, 1977) is an American politician, civic leader, and non-profit executive. She was elected to serve on the Durham City Council in 2017 and re-elected in 2021 before losing to Matt Kopac in 2025.

Freeman also serves as the Director of Thread Capital and the Director of Partnership Development at CornerSquare Community Capital of the North Carolina Rural Economic Development Center. She is active in the National League of Cities, as part of the Transportation and Infrastructure Federal Advocacy Program, and served on the League's Racial Equity and Leadership Council. Freeman served as president of the North Carolina League of Cities' Women in Municipal Government Committee. An Episcopalian, she co-founded Episcopalians United Against Racism and the Episcopal Diocese of North Carolina's Racial Justice and Reconciliation Committee, the latter of which she has served as co-chair since 2016.

== Early life and education ==
Freeman was born in Trenton, New Jersey, on September 30, 1977. She grew up in the Bronx and was raised in a single-parent household and, as the oldest of six children, helped raise her siblings. One of her younger sisters has severe developmental and physical disabilities. She is a great-granddaughter of Carrie Elizabeth Smith. She received a Bachelor of Arts degree in communications and media studies from Rutgers University–New Brunswick and a Master of Arts degree in public administration from North Carolina Central University in 2020.

== Career ==
Freeman is the Director of Partnership Development, CornerSquare Community Capital of the NC Rural Economic Development Center and the Director of Thread Capital.

=== Politics ===
In 2016, Freeman was appointed to the State Executive Board of the North Carolina Democratic Party.

She was elected to represent Ward 1 on the Durham City Council in 2017, defeating incumbent Cora Cole-McFadden. Freeman was reelected in 2021 for a second term, due to expire in 2025. She was appointed by the mayor to serve on the Council Subcommittee on Housing, the Workforce Development Board, the Triangle J Council of Governments, the Northeast Central Durham Subcommittee, the Joint City-County Planning Committee, the Joint City-County Committee, the Environmental Affairs Board, the Carolina Theatre Board of Directors, and the Mayor's Committee for Persons with Disabilities. Freeman was also appointed by the mayor to serve as an alternate on the Audit Services Oversight Committee, the Durham County Criminal Justice Advisory Committee, and the Gang Reduction Steering Committee.

When the Durham City Council voted to give themselves a $10,000 pay raise in 2021, Freeman was the only councilmember to vote against the measure. In 2022, she was among the councilmembers who voted in favor of a pilot program with the gunshot detection company ShotSpotter.

On February 6, 2023, Freeman and Durham Mayor Elaine O'Neal voted against the annexation of twenty-four parcels of land in Southeast Durham for a housing development. In a 5-2 decision, the council voted to annex Mockingbird Lane and Sherron Road for the construction of up to 545 townhouses. In a second vote, Councilwoman Monique Holsey-Hyman joined Freeman and O'Neal in voting against the proposal.

In November 2025, she lost her re-election bid to Matt Kopac. Weeks later, Freeman filed to run for the North Carolina Senate against incumbent Sophia Chitlik in the 2026 election.

=== Community advocacy and civic leadership ===
Freeman has been active in the National League of Cities as part of their Transportation and Infrastructure Federal Advocacy program and served on the League's Racial Equity and Leadership Council. She previously served as the president of the North Carolina League of Cities' Women in Municipal Government committee.

She is involved in other community organizations including the Durham Early Childhood Action Steering Committee and is the organizer and a coordinating committee member of Organizing Against Racism Durham.

=== Controversies ===
On March 23, 2023, Freeman defended Councilwoman Holsey-Hyman as she faced allegations of extortion, and accused Durham Mayor Pro Tempore Mark-Anthony Middleton of bullying black women. After a council meeting regarding the allegations, Freeman and Middleton argued in a room outside the council chamber, where Freeman was heard yelling expletives at him. According to Indy Week, Freeman punched O'Neal and Councilman Leonardo Williams, who were restraining her, in an attempt to punch Middleton.

In June 2023, Durham city attorney Kimberly Rehberg, at the requests of Freeman, Holsey-Hyman, and O'Neal, sent a certified letter to the Wikimedia Foundation requesting the identities of three Wikipedia editors who had worked on the politicians' articles to be revealed, along with individual changes requested to be made to the aforementioned articles. Freeman in particular contended the inclusion of information surrounding her public defense of Holsey-Hyman, stating it to be "unflattering", and that she felt "deep unease" that the same user who had created Holsey-Hyman's article had also created her own article. It was later confirmed by a Wikimedia Foundation spokeswoman that the letter was incorrectly addressed and never received.

On August 5, 2025, Freeman repeatedly poked Durham County Commission chair Nida Allam in a recorded confrontation at a candidate forum hosted by People's Alliance PAC. Allam stated the jabs left bruising and fellow Durham City Councilmmeber Javiera Caballero, who is seen in the video attempting to defuse the situation, told The News & Observer that "What I observed was one-sided; it was not a discussion or an argument, [Allam] was completely caught off guard by Councilwoman Freeman.”

== Personal life ==
Freeman moved to the Golden Belt Historic District in 2007. She is married and has three children.

Freeman, who is Episcopalian, is a co-founder and core team leader of Episcopalians United Against Racism and a co-founder of the Episcopal Diocese of North Carolina's Racial Justice and Reconciliation Committee, where she has served as co-chair since 2016.

In 2015, Freeman became a member of the Orange and Durham Counties Chapter of the Junior League.
