= Elaine O'Neal (politician) =

American politician and judge

Elaine M. O'Neal
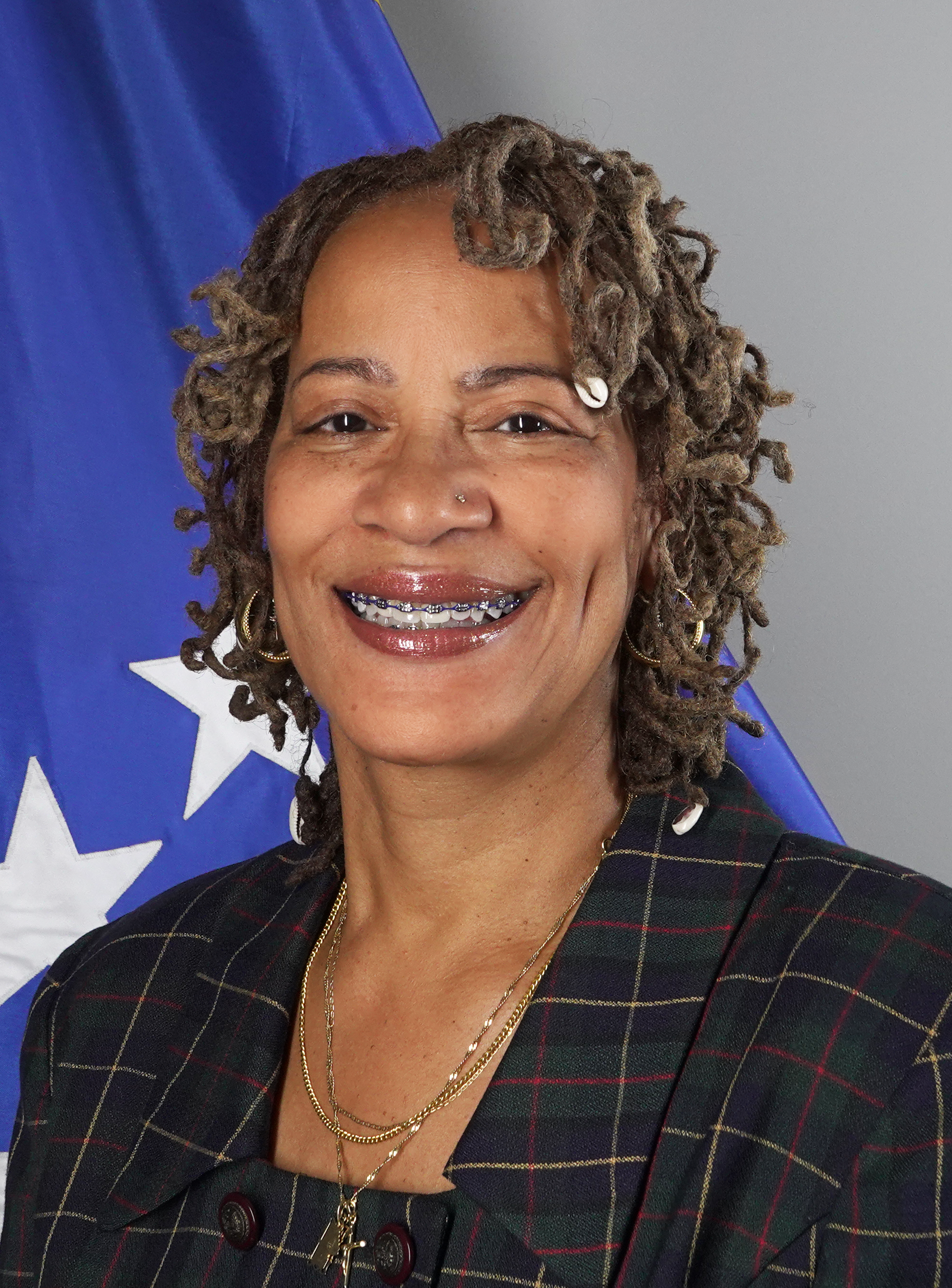

Mayor of Durham, North Carolina
- In office December 6, 2021 – December 4, 2023
- Preceded by: Steve Schewel
- Succeeded by: Leonardo Williams

Judge of the North Carolina Superior Court for Durham County
- In office 2011–2018

Judge of the North Carolina District Court for Durham County
- In office 1994–2011

Dean of the North Carolina Central University School of Law
- Interim
- In office July 16, 2018 – July 1, 2020
- Preceded by: Phyliss Craig-Taylor
- Succeeded by: Browne C. Lewis

Personal details
- Born: 1962 (age 63–64) Durham, North Carolina, U.S.
- Party: Democratic
- Education: North Carolina Central University (BS, JD)

Elaine M. O'Neal (born 1962) is an American attorney, academic administrator, judge, and politician who served as the mayor of Durham, North Carolina from 2021 to 2023. O'Neal is the city's first female African-American mayor. Prior to serving as mayor, O'Neal was the first woman appointed as chief district court judge in Durham County and the first woman North Carolina Superior Court judge in Durham County. She served as an interim dean of the North Carolina Central University School of Law from 2018 to 2020.

== Early life and education ==
O'Neal was born in Durham in 1962 and grew up in the West End community, spending much of her childhood at the Pauli Murray Family Home. She is the youngest of five children. Her parents were active in the local community; her mother, Nakoda, worked in electoral precincts and served as a school parent–teacher association president and her father, Rueben, was a custodian and the treasurer of their church. As a child, O'Neal played the tambourine at her church.

She was educated in Durham Public Schools and graduated from Hillside High School, where she was co-captain of the color guard, in 1980. O'Neal attended North Carolina Central University, where she became a member of Delta Sigma Theta sorority and graduated Cum Laude with a Bachelor of Science in mathematics in 1984. She received her Juris Doctor degree from the North Carolina Central University School of Law.

== Legal and judicial career ==
O'Neal served as a judge of the North Carolina District Court from 1994 to 2011 and was the first woman in Durham County to be named a Chief District Court judge. As a judge, she advocated for same-sex adoption and LGBT rights. She served as a judge of the North Carolina Superior Court from 2011 to 2018 as the first woman Superior Court Judge in Durham County. In 2015, O'Neal was appointed as the Chairwoman of the Superintendent's Code of Student Conduct Task Force for Durham Public Schools, focusing on ending the school-to-prison pipeline. In June 2018, O'Neal retired as a judge and was selected as interim dean of the North Carolina Central University School of Law. That same year, O'Neal was appointed as Chair of the Racial Equity Task Force for Durham by Mayor Steve Schewel.

O'Neal is a member of the Durham County Bar Association and the George H. White Bar Association.

== Mayoral career ==
=== Mayoral campaign ===
O'Neal announced her mayoral campaign on July 26, 2021. In her announcement, O’Neal called back to her deep Durham roots and highlighted her years in public service. She mourned the young lives lost to violent crime in Durham and ensured that she will improve the conditions of her home city. To close her speech, O’Neal envisioned a “Durham for everyone. United and not divided.”

=== Tenure ===
O'Neal was elected as the first African-American woman Mayor of Durham in 2021, succeeding Steve Schewel. She received two-thirds of the vote in a seven-way nonpartisan primary election on October 5, 2021. O'Neal received 25,707 votes or 84.69% of the vote. City councilwoman Javiera Caballero, also a Democrat running for mayor, suspended her campaign on October 11, 2021, and ceded the election to O'Neal. After being elected into office, O'Neal stated that her first priority would be to reduce gun violence.

In June 2023, Durham city attorney Kimberly Rehberg, at the requests of O'Neal and councilwomen Monique Holsey-Hyman and DeDreana Freeman, sent a certified letter to the Wikimedia Foundation requesting for the identities of three Wikipedia editors who had worked on the politicians' articles to be revealed, along with individual changes requested to be made to the aforementioned articles. O'Neal in particular requested the identity of one of the three editors, whom she cited to be the uploader of an image of her signature to her article. The request for the editor’s identity was denied, but the signature was removed, making it the only approved request of the document.

=== Programs and policies ===
On April 18, 2022, 3 months after O'Neal was elected as mayor, she released her first State of the City address. She said that her three biggest concerns for Durham were reducing crime, developing small businesses, and enhancing transportation. Gun violence is a major issue in Durham and was one of the first major issues O'Neal discussed. She stated: "Our city is in crisis, and gun violence has taken the lives of far too many of our relatives and our young Black men." In her plan, she also addressed wanting to establish equity in certain areas due to past urban renewal policies that have caused those areas to suffer. O'Neal said that the city is investing resources back into those areas in order to increase economic prosperity and allocating city funds to low-cost loans for local business to increase economic prosperity.

To tackle crime in the city she is working with current and past city leaders to create a program that will work with Durham's youth and young adults. The program would offer mentoring, therapy, and after-school programs. One of the aims of this program would be to expunge the records of previous offenders using a program under the Hayti Reborn organization. The hope of this program is to engage those closest to the pain to help turn the city around. O’Neal faced scrutiny because of the interactions she had with former gang members. She explained the desire to get their perspective on how to reduce gun violence within the city and have them be a part of the solution. In an effort to address the scrutiny, O'Neal stated: "it pains me to think that we should not talk or interact with these young men, to get their perspective on Durham and have them be a part of the solution."

O'Neal announced the city's contribution to assist small businesses and especially the rebuilding of black-owned companies. O'Neal has said any small business can apply to the Durham Small Business Opportunity Loan Fund regardless of the need for financial assistance. The program has distributed $800,000 in loans to 38 small business owners since the summer of 2020, contributions were made from the city and county funds and Duke University.

A mock $19.8 million check from the U.S. Department of Transportation (USDOT) was presented to O'Neal and Transportation Director Sean Egan. This money was to be used for the 1.8- mile Rail Trail and the main Durham Station improvements and upgrades.

The City of Durham has also created a new Down Payment Assistance program. Those who are low-income and due to rising prices in the city are struggling to buy homes, they are the main focus of the program. Up to $20,000 in down payments and closing cost is available for qualifying applicants.

== Personal life ==
O'Neal is the fifth and youngest child born to Reuben (Duke) and Nekoda (Polly) O'Neal. She is the mother of Koren O. Lee, Gregory J. Lee, Sr., Jeanna Joint, and Macklin Bushfan. O'Neal is a practicing Baptist and attends First Calvary Baptist Church in Durham. She is a board member of the non-profit organization Made in Durham.
