= Durham Arts Council Building =

Cultural Center in North Carolina

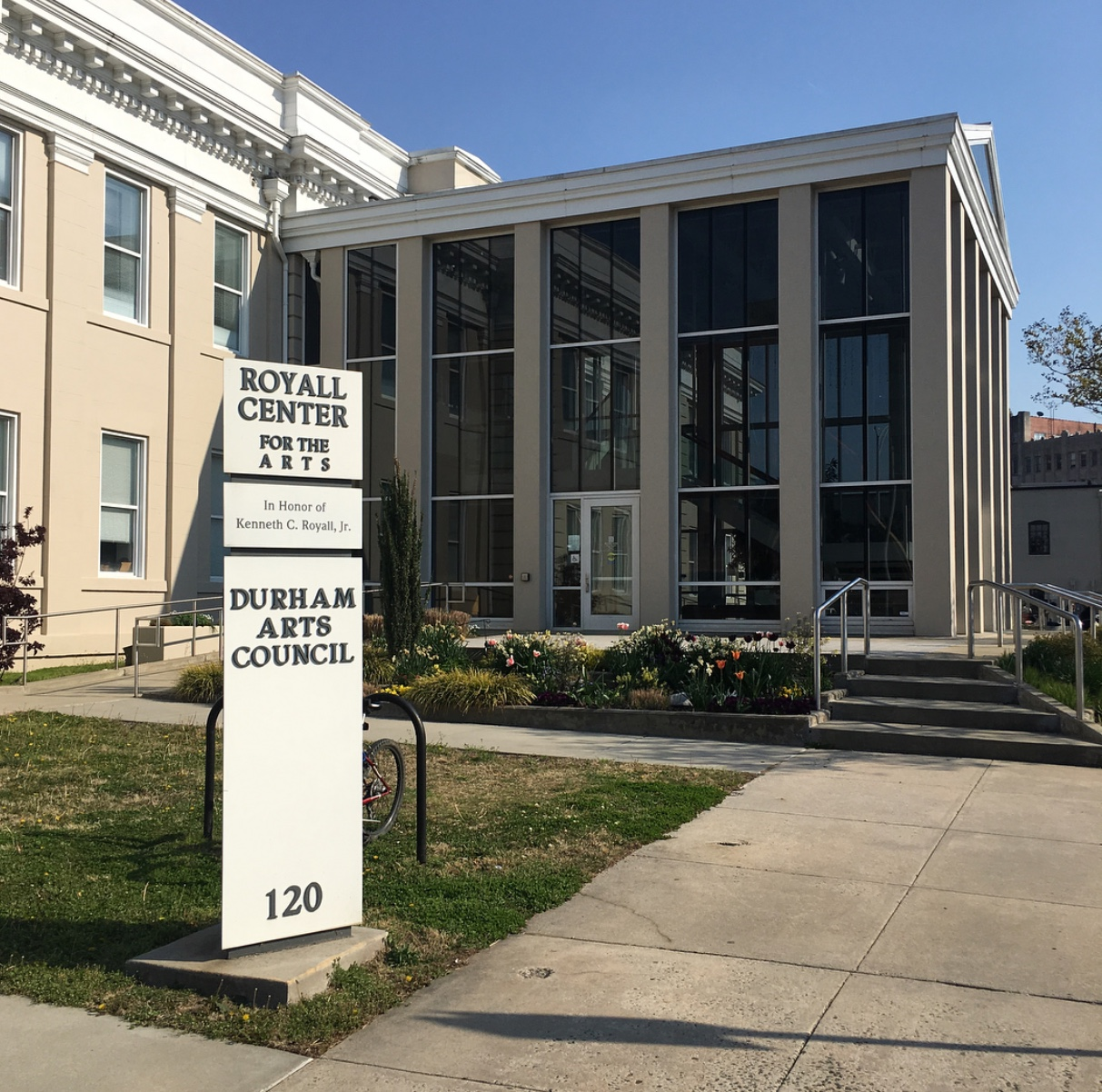
- Interactive map of Durham Arts Council Building
- Address: 120 Morris Street; Durham, North Carolina; United States
- Coordinates: 35°59′52.69″N 78°54′12.77″W
- Owner: City of Durham
- Operator: Durham Arts Council nonprofit and local arts agency
- Type: Masonry
- Current use: Cultural center

Construction
- Opened: 1906
- Rebuilt: 1924, 1986
- Architects: Oliver Duke Wheeler, Frank Pierce Milburn, Frank DePasquale

Website
- durhamarts.org

The Durham Arts Council Building is a cultural center located in downtown Durham, North Carolina within the Downtown Durham Historic District, however it is classified as a noncontributing building.

== History ==
This city-owned edifice was constructed in 1906 to a neoclassical design by architect Oliver Duke Wheeler and his collaborators with a dome and pediment façade. Later modifications on the building were designed by Frank Pierce Milburn and Frank DePasquale.

At the beginning, the building was used as Central High School until 1922. In 1924 it was modified by removing the dome as well as the pediment and then used as city hall. In 1978, it became the home of the Durham Arts Council, one of the oldest arts councils in the United States, founded in 1954. In 1986 the edifice was again completely renovated including the construction of a glass atrium at the original entrance.

Since the last modification of the building in the 1980s the Durham Arts Council uses it as a cultural center which contains PSI Theatre, four galleries, various studios and rehearsal spaces, an outdoor terrace and gardens.
