= List of mayors of Durham, North Carolina =

The Mayor of Durham is the chief executive of the government of the city of Durham, North Carolina. The current mayor is Leonardo Williams, who assumed office in 2023.

The first mayor of Durham was tobacco merchant J. W. Cheek who was elected in 1869, although the position was originally known as "magistrate of police" up until 1871, when the title was changed to "mayor" during the tenure of W. J. H. Durham. Mayoral elections were held yearly until 1895, when they were changed to be held every other year.

| # | Portrait | Name | Term in office | Length of service | Party affiliation | Previous office |
|---|---|---|---|---|---|---|
| 1 | | J. W. Cheek | August 1869 – May 1, 1871 | ~1 year, 260 days | | |
| 2 | | W. J. H. Durham | May 1, 1871 – September 18, 1871 | 141 days | | |
| Acting | | R. F. Morris | September 18, 1871 – May 16, 1872 | 242 days | | |
| 3 | | E. J. Parrish | May 16, 1872 – May 6, 1873 | 355 days | | |
| Acting | | Julian Carr (1845 – 1924; aged 78) | May 6, 1873 – May 17, 1873 | 11 days | | |
| 4 | | W. J. H. Durham | 1873 – 1877 | 4 years | | Mayor of Durham, North Carolina (1871) |
| 5 | | Doctor Claiborn Parrish (1807 – 1883; aged 76) | 1877 – 1880 | 3 years | | |
| 6 | | Isaac Newton Link (Unknown – 1895) | 1880 – 1881 | 1 year | | |
| 7 | | Doctor Claiborn Parrish (1807 – 1883; aged 76) | 1881 – 1882 | 1 year | | Mayor of Durham, North Carolina (1877–1880) |
| 8 | | Edward Carney Hackney (1856 – 1903; aged 46) | May 2, 1882 – May 8, 1883 | 1 year, 6 days | | |
| 9 | | Doctor Claiborn Parrish (1807 – 1883; aged 76) | May 8, 1883 – July 1883 (Died in office) | ~ 2 months | | Mayor of Durham, North Carolina (1881–1882) |
| Acting | | W. T. Lipscomb | August 7, 1883 – May 6, 1884 | 273 days | | |
| 10 | | J. F. Freeland | May 6, 1884 – May 8, 1888 | 4 years, 2 days | | |
| 11 | | W. J. Christian | May 8, 1888 – May 6, 1890 | 1 year, 363 days | | |
| 12 | | M. A. Angier | May 6, 1890 – May 3, 1893 | 2 years, 363 days | | |
| 13 | | T. L. Peay | May 3, 1893 – May 8, 1894 | 1 years, 5 days | | |
| 14 | | Isaac Newton Link (Unknown – 1895) | May 8, 1894 – January 5, 1895 (Died in office) | 242 days | | Mayor of Durham, North Carolina (1880–1881) |
| Acting | | J. W. Carlton | January 5, 1895 – May 7, 1895 | 122 days | | |
| 15 | | T. L Peay | May 7, 1895 – May 1897 | 2 years | | Mayor of Durham, North Carolina (1893–1894) |
| 16 | | Moses Ellis McCown (1849 – 1925; aged 75) | unknown – 1903 | | | |
| 17 | | J. F. Freeland | 1903 – 1905 | 2 years | | Mayor of Durham, North Carolina (1884–1888) |
| 18 | | Paul Cameron Graham | 1905 – 1909 | 4 years | | |
| 19 | | W. J. Griswold | 1909 – 1911 | 2 years | | Durham City Council (1905 – 1907) |
| 20 | | Willis J. Brogden (1877 – 1935; aged 58) | 1911 – 1915 | 4 years | | |
| 21 | | Benjamin S. Skinner | 1915 – 1917 | 2 years | | Durham City Council (1913 – 1915) |
| 22 | | M. E. Newsom | 1917 – 1921 | 4 years | | Durham City Council (1913 – 1917) |
| 23 | | John Moore Manning (1857 – 1933; aged 76) | 1921 – 1931 | 10 years | | Durham City Council (1919 – 1921) |
| 24 | | Delos Sorrell (1882 – 1961; aged 79) | 1931 – 1933 | 2 years | | |
| 25 | | William Frederick Carr (1881 – 1956; aged 75) | 1933 – 1949 | 16 years | | Durham City Council (1917 – 1933) |
| 26 | | Dan Edwards (1914 – 2001; aged 87) | 1949 – 1951 | 2 years | | North Carolina Representative from Durham County (1947–1949) |
| 27 | | Emanuel J. Evans (1907 – 1997; aged 89) | 1951 – 1963 | 12 years | Democratic | |
| 28 | | Wense Grabarek (1919 – 2019; aged 100) | 1963 – 1971 | 8 years | Democratic | Durham City Council (1957–1961) |
| 29 | | James Hawkins (1925 – 2010; aged 85) | 1971 – 1975 | 4 years | | Durham City Council (1959–1967) |
| 30 | | Wade Cavin (1916 – 1997; aged 81) | 1975 – 1979 | 4 years | | Durham City Council (1969–1975) |
| 31 | | Harry E. Rodenhizer, Jr (1927 – 2007; aged 80) | 1979 – 1981 | 2 years | Republican | Durham Public School Board |
| 32 | | Charles Markham (1938 – 2010; aged 83) | 1981 – 1985 | 4 years | | |
| 33 | | Wib Gulley (born 1948; aged 73) | 1985 – 1989 | 4 years | Democratic | Durham Board of Adjustment (1983–1985) |
| 34 | | Chester L. Jenkins (1938 – 2009; aged 71) | 1989 – 1991 | 2 years | Democratic | Durham City Council (1981–1989) |
| 35 | | Harry E. Rodenhizer, Jr (1927 – 2007; aged 80) | 1991 – 1993 | 2 years | Republican | Mayor of Durham, North Carolina (1979–1981) |
| 36 | | Sylvia Kerckhoff (born 1928; aged 97) | 1993 – 1997 | 4 years | | Durham City Council |
| 37 | | Nick Tennyson (born 1950; aged 71) | 1997 – 2001 | 4 years | Republican | |
| 38 | | Bill Bell (born 1941; aged 80) | 2001 – December 5, 2017 | 16 years | Democratic | Durham County Board of Commissioners (1996–2000) |
| 39 | | Steve Schewel (born 1951; aged 70) | December 5, 2017 – December 6, 2021 | 4 years | Democratic | Durham City Council (2011–2017) |
| 40 | | Elaine O'Neal (born 1962; aged 63) | December 6, 2021 – December 4, 2023 | 2 Years | Democratic | North Carolina Superior Court (2011-2018) |
| 41 | | Leonardo Williams | December 4, 2023 | | Democratic | Durham City Council (2021-2023) |
