= Durham Public Schools =

School district in North Carolina, United States

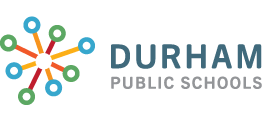

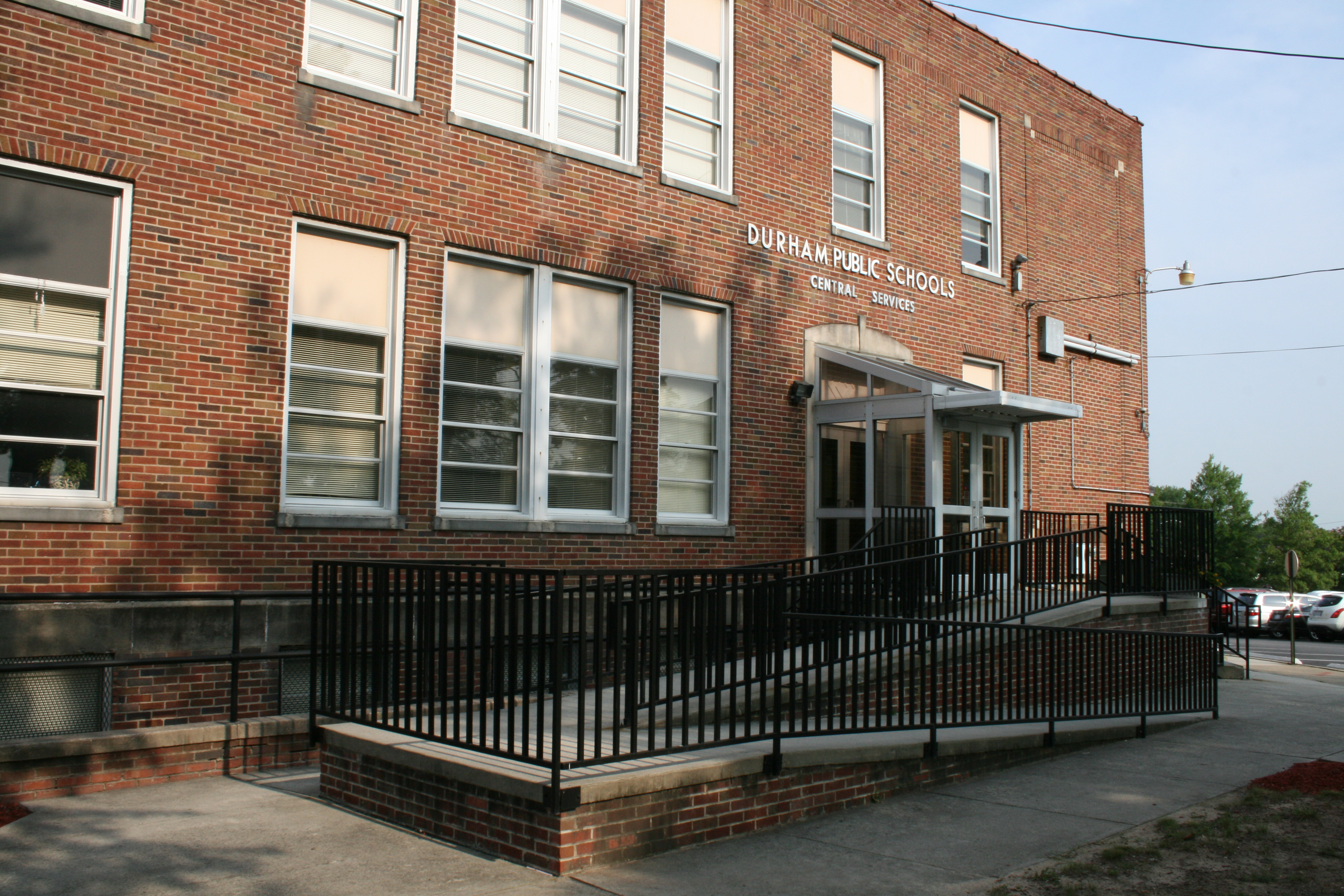
- Durham Public Schools central offices

Address
- 511 Cleveland St Durham, Durham, North Carolina, 27701
- Coordinates: 35.997097°N 78.897272°W

District information
- Type: Public
- Grades: PK–12
- Established: 1992
- Superintendent: Dr. Anthony S. Lewis
- School board: Bettina Umstead, Ch. Jovonia Lewis, V.Ch. Natalie Beyer; Jessica Carda-Auten; Emily Chávez; Millicent Rogers; Alexandra Valladares
- Governing agency: City of Durham
- Schools: 57ref name="nces_dist" />
- Budget: US$455,686,000 (in FY 2021)
- NCES District ID: 3701260

Students and staff
- Students: 31,531
- Faculty: 2,481.23 FTE
- Teachers: 2,368.88 FTE
- Student–teacher ratio: 13.31 to 1

Other information
- Website: dpsnc.net

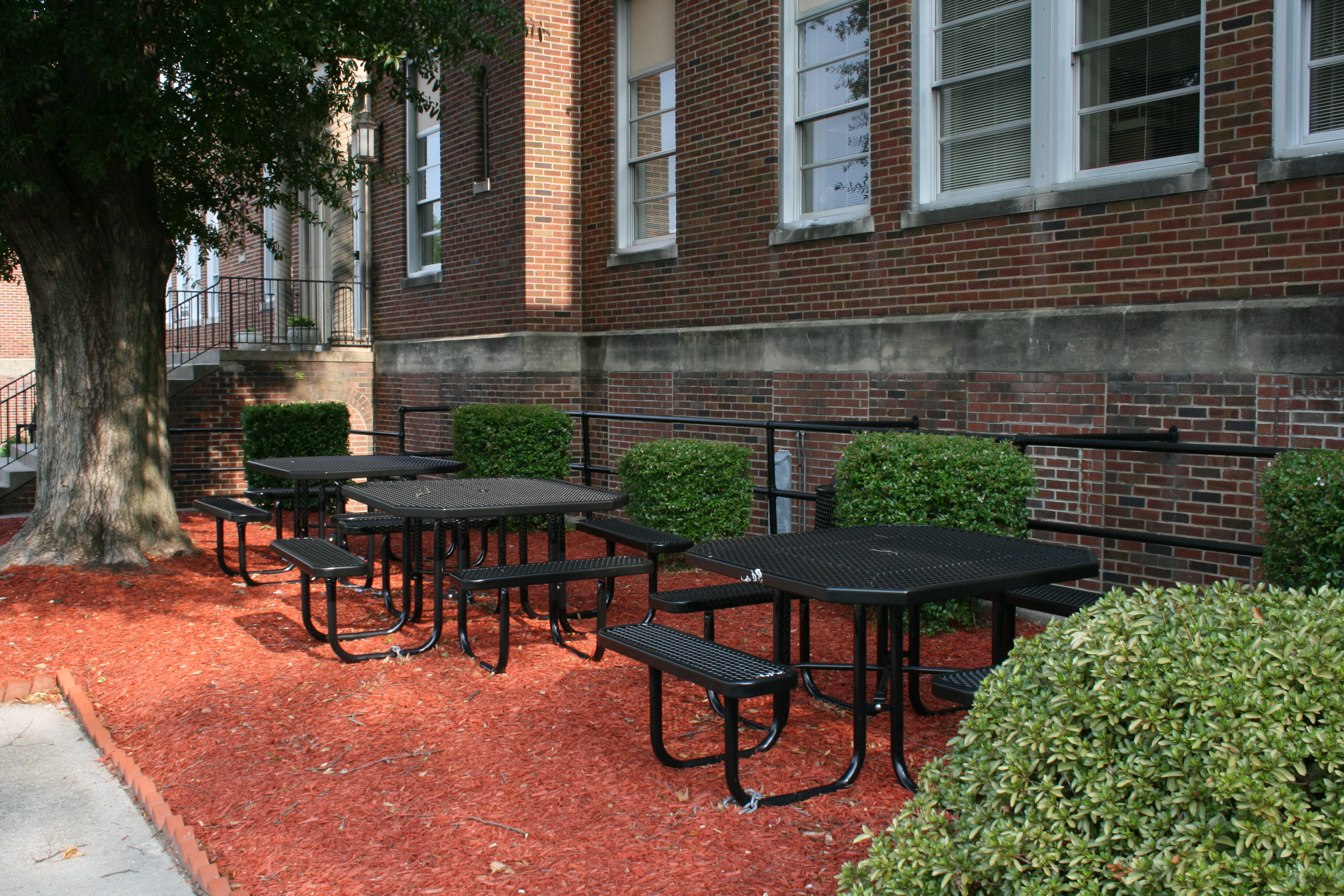
Picnic tables outside the DPS central office building

The Durham Public Schools district is a public school district in Durham, North Carolina. Formed in 1992 with the merger of Durham's previous two school districts, it is 8th largest school system in North Carolina as of November 2020. There are 57 public schools in the system, consisting of 32 elementary (K-5), 9 middle (6–8), 2 secondary (6–12), 11 high (9–12), 1 alternative, 1 hospital school, and 1 virtual academy (K-12). Durham's schools are traditionally named after notable members of the local community.

== Formation ==
In 1927, Hope Valley School was built for grades 1 through 11. It was the first public school in Southwestern Durham. Changes to the Hope Valley School facility were made in 1941 and 1952. the school was subsequently downgraded to an elementary school with the opening of Southern High School in the fall of 1956. In 1964, Jordan High School on Garrett Road was constructed.

== Integration history ==
Prior to integration, white students attended Durham High School and black students attended Hillside High School.

In 1956, Dr. Martin Luther King Jr. spoke at Hillside High School, which was one of the Southeast's highest-ranked black high schools.

In 1957, the parents of Joycelyn McKissick and Elaine Richardson sued for their daughters to be reassigned to Durham High School of the Durham City School System.

In 1958, Rencher N. Harris became the first black member of Durham City Board of Education.

In 1959, the Durham City School Board allowed reassignment of eight black pupils to previously all-white schools. The first black students to integrate were Anita Brame and Lucy Jones at Brogden Junior High (now Brogden Middle School). In 1959, Joycelyn McKissick became the first African American student at Durham High School (now Durham School of the Arts).

In September 1963, Charmaine McKissick among eight other minority youths were the first to desegregate into the Durham Public School system at the Elementary level. Along with her Floyd McKissick Jr, they entered into the North Durham Elementary School. Charmaine McKissick was the youngest to participate in the desegregation. She recalls, "My family prepared us all, every day, with the armor to return the next. " Not many students are willing to talk about their experiences. McKissick-Melton also states, "It is too painful." She goes onto write, "There are a few exceptions such as my good friend Janice Guess, whom I encouraged to write her story, and she did in, 'Little Black Girls Want Pearls Too.'" The integration was a harsh burden for a lot of those children and families involved. McKissick also writes, "The hurt is so deep from the wounds of more than fifty years ago that they still feel the pain." McKissick-Melton also write, "We had some difficult times but nothing compared to the older students, including my sisters before me. I had it easier because the kids had not had enough time to learn and display their hatred, racist and their bigoted behavior." Charmaine McKissick-Melton, Ph.D., has since then decided to give back to the Durham Community as an associate professor in the Department of Mass Communication at North Carolina Central University. She is also the daughter of the late Evelyn and Floyd McKissick, Jude Floyd B. McKissick Sr.

In 1968, The National Association for the Advancement of Colored People (NAACP) sued the Durham County School System in order to integrate its schools. The Durham County School Board's integration plan was accepted by the Federal District Court in Greensboro. The plan stated that all high schools and junior high schools would be integrated in the fall of 1969. The Federal District Judge gave an extra year for elementary schools due to space limitations and the need to purchase mobile units.

Durham County School System's principals had all been hired during legal segregation, so there was much discussion in the community about how successful integration would be in Durham County. One problem that existed was at Southern High School whose principal was Sidney Ray. Southern High School's mascot was the Rebel, and the high school used the confederate flag, and that the community thought that part of town was the redneck part of town. The mascot was later changed to the Spartan. There was less concern about Jordan High School because it had been attended by more affluent families of all colors. At Northern High School, there was a mix. The school had one of the toughest principals in the district.

In 1969, the U.S. Supreme Court in Alexander vs. Holmes County Board of Education reversed the decision of the Fifth Circuit Court of Appeals, ruling that continued operation of segregated schools in Mississippi was no longer permissible. The NAACP filed suit in the Court of Appeals in Richmond saying, based on Alexander-Holmes Decision, they wanted all of Durham's elementary schools integrated. The Fourth Circuit Court of Appeals agreed to hear the case in December. The judge stated that Durham County and City Schools had been given 15 years to accomplish integration and had failed. The Fourth Circuit Court of Appeals ruled integration would happen immediately.

In the fall of 1969, all three high schools (Southern, C.E. Jordan, and Northern) and junior high schools were integrated as ordered. Durham City Schools' high schools were Durham High School and Hillside High School, which were at this time were still the largest public schools in both the city and county of Durham.

In 1970, Durham County elementary schools were fully integrated. Durham City schools began to decline after integration. Middle- and upper-class began emigrating out of the Durham City School System to the Durham County School System. The Durham City School System became populated with poorer people. Hillside High School, almost entirely black, maintained a good number of middle-class blacks. Due to immense migration, blacks began to control the Durham City School System and elected a majority black school board and a black superintendent.

A merger attempt of the Durham City School System and the Durham County School System was made in 1972. There were several more attempt that failed to gain support. Finally, in 1992 an agreement was reached. During the merger, the Durham County School System's junior high (grades 7, 8 & 9) and senior high (10, 11, & 12) format was abolished and the Durham City School System's format of middle schools (grades 6, 7 and 8) and high schools (grades 9, 10, 11 and 12) was implemented.

In 1992, the Durham County School System and the Durham City School System merged to form Durham Public Schools.

== 2025-2026 Board of Education ==
Board members are:

- Millicent Rogers, Chair (Consolidated District B) Term expires in July 2028 (Serving Durham Public Schools since July 1, 2022)
- Jessica Carda-Auten, Vice Chair (District 3) - Term expires on July 1, 2028 (Serving Durham Public Schools since July 1, 2023)
- Bettina Umstead, (District 2) - Term expires on July 1, 2026 (Serving Durham Public Schools since July 1, 2018)
- Natalie Beyer, (District 4) - Term expires on July 1, 2026 (Serving Durham Public Schools since July 1, 2010)
- Emily Chávez, (District 1) - Term expires on July 1, 2026 (Serving Durham Public Schools since July 1, 2022)
- Joy Harrell Goff, (At-large) - Term expires on July 1, 2028 (Serving Durham Public Schools since July 1, 2024)
- Wendell Tabb, (Consolidated District A) - Term expires on July 1, 2028 (Serving Durham Public Schools since July 1, 2024)

== 2024-2025 Board of Education ==
Board members are:

- Millicent Rogers, Chair (Consolidated District B) Term expires in July 2028
- Jessica Carda-Auten, Vice Chair (District 3) - Term expires on July 1, 2028
- Bettina Umstead, (District 2) - Term expires on July 1, 2026
- Natalie Beyer, (District 4) - Term expires on July 1, 2026
- Emily Chávez, (District 1) - Term expires on July 1, 2026
- Joy Harrell Goff, (At-large) - Term expires on July 1, 2028
- Wendell Tabb, (Consolidated District A) - Term expires on July 1, 2028

== 2023-2024 Board of Education ==
Board members are:

- Bettina Umstead, Chair (District 2) - Term expires on July 1, 2026
- Jovonia Lewis, Vice Chair (Consolidated District A) - Term expires on July 1, 2024
- Natalie Beyer (District 4) - Term expires on July 1, 2026
- Emily Chávez (District 1)* - Term expires on July 1, 2026
- Millicent Rogers (Consolidated District B)* - Term expires July 1, 2024
- Jessica Carda-Auten (District 3) - Term expires on July 1, 2026
- Alexandra Valladares (At Large) - Term expires on July 1, 2024

== 2023-2024 Board of Education ==
Board members are:

- Bettina Umstead, Chair (District 2) - Term expires on July 1, 2026
- Jovonia Lewis, Vice Chair (Consolidated District A) - Term expires on July 1, 2024
- Natalie Beyer (District 4) - Term expires on July 1, 2026
- Emily Chávez (District 1)* - Term expires on July 1, 2026
- Millicent Rogers (Consolidated District B)* - Term expires July 1, 2024
- Jessica Carda-Auten (District 3) - Term expires on July 1, 2026
- Alexandra Valladares (At Large) - Term expires on July 1, 2024

* DPS Board of Education District 3 Candidate Selection - March 16, 2023

- (https://www.youtube.com/live/q0o6Efmm_zk?si=pZpWTa7qHHrRV77d)

== 2022-2023 Board of Education ==
Board members are:

- Bettina Umstead, Chair (District 2) - Term expires on July 1, 2026
- Jovonia Lewis, Vice Chair (Consolidated District A) - Term expires on July 1, 2024
- Natalie Beyer (District 4) - Term expires on July 1, 2026
- Emily Chávez (District 1)* - Term expires on July 1, 2026
- Millicent Rogers (Consolidated District B)* - Term expires July 1, 2024
- Matt Sears (District 3) - Term expires on July 1, 2026
- Alexandra Valladares (At Large) - Term expires on July 1, 2024

* swearing-in ceremony on July 8, 2022

- (https://www.youtube.com/watch?v=g-9mhaWZ76U)

== 2021-2022 Board of Education ==
Board members are:

- Bettina Umstead, Chair (District 2)
- Jovonia Lewis, Vice Chair (Consolidated District A)
- Natalie Beyer (District 4)
- Mike Lee (District 1)
- Frederick Xavier Ravin III (Consolidated District B)
- Matt Sears (District 3)
- Alexandra Valladares (At Large)

== 2020-2021 Board of Education ==
Board members are:

- Bettina Umstead, Chair (District 2)
- Mike Lee, Vice Chair (District 1)
- Natalie Beyer (District 4)
- Jovonia Lewis (Consolidated District A)
- Frederick Xavier Ravin III (Consolidated District B)
- Matt Sears (District 3)
- Alexandra Valladares (At Large)

== 2019-2020 Board of Education ==
Board members are:

- Mike Lee, Chair (District 1)
- Bettina Umstead, Vice Chair (District 2)
- Natalie Beyer (District 4)
- Minnie Forte-Brown (Consolidated District A)
- Xavier Cason (Consolidated District B)
- Matt Sears (District 3)
- Steve Unruhe (At Large)

== 2018-2019 Board of Education ==
Board members are: (The swearing-in ceremony took place on July 10, 2018)

- The chair is Mike Lee (District 1)
- The vice chair is Steve Unruhe (At Large)
- Natalie Beyer (District 4)
- Minnie Forte-Brown (Consolidated District A)
- Bettina Umstead (District 2)
- Xavier Cason (Consolidated District B)
- Matt Sears (District 3)

== 2017-2018 Board of Education ==
Board members are:

- The chair is Mike Lee (District 1)
- The vice chair is Steve Unruhe (At Large)
- Natalie Beyer (District 4)
- Minnie Forte-Brown (Consolidated District A)
- Bettina Umstead (District 2)
- Xavier Cason (Consolidated District B)
- Matt Sears (District 3)

== 2016-2017 Board of Education ==
Board members are:

- The chair is Mike Lee (District 1)
- The vice chair is Natalie Beyer (District 4)
- Minnie Forte-Brown (Consolidated District A)
- Bettina Umstead (District 2)
- Xavier Cason (Consolidated District B)
- Matt Sears (District 3)
- Steve Unruhe (At Large)

== 2014-2015 Board of Education ==
Board members are:

- The chair is Heidi Carter (Consolidated District B). Term expires June 30, 2016.
- The vice chair is Minnie Forte-Brown (Consolidated District A). Term expires June 30, 2016.
- Natalie Beyer (District 4)
- Leigh Bordley (At Large) Term expires June 30, 2016
- Sendolo Diaminah
- Mike Lee
- Matt Sears

== 2013-2014 Board of Education ==
Board members are:

- The chair is Heidi Carter (Consolidated District B). Term expires June 30, 2016.
- The vice chair is Minni Forte-Brown (Consolidated District A). Term expires June 30, 2016.
- Natalie Beyer (District 4) Term expires June 30, 2014
- Leigh Bordley (At Large) Term expires June 30, 2016
- Nancy Cox (District 3) Term expires June 30, 2014
- Fredrick A. Davis (District 2) Term expires June 30, 2014
- Omega Curtis Parker (District 1) Term expires June 30, 2014

== 2010-2012 Board of Education ==
The chairman is Minnie Forte-Brown (District A). The vice chairman is Heidi Carter (District B). Board members are:

- Leigh Bordley (At Large)
- Omega Curtis Parker (District 1)
- Fredrick A. Davis (District 2)
- Nancy Cox (District 3)
- Natalie Beyer (District 4)

== Superintendents ==
- 2024 – Dr. Anthony S. Lewis
- 2024 – August 2024 Catty Moore (interim superintendent)
- 2017 – 2024 Pascal Mubenga
- 2017 – November 2017, Aaron Beaulieu (interim superintendent)
- 2014 – 2017 Bert L'Homme
- 2014 – Hugh Osteen (interim superintendent)
- 2010 – 2013 Eric J. Becoats
- 2010 – H. Hank Hurd (interim superintendent)
- 2006 – 2009 Carl E. Harris
- 1997 – 2006 Ann T. Denlinger
- 1994 – 1996 Theodore R. Drain
- 1992 – 1993 C. Owen Phillips
- 1992 – Kenneth Brunson
- 1990 – 1991 Jerry D. Weast
- 1988 – Cleveland Hammonds
- 1975 – Benjamin T. Brooks
- 1975 – Lew W. Hannen

== Statistics ==
Durham Public Schools employs 4,697 people (2,243 teachers) and had 33,035 students in the 2016–2017 school year. Durham Public Schools is the third largest employer in Durham, NC

- Pre-Kindergarten: 426
- Grades K-5: 15,799
- Grades 6-8: 6,753
- Grades 9-12: 10,483

Teacher salaries range from $39,375-$99,359 (includes local supplement and differential).

The school system utilizes more than 300 school buses to transport over 16,000 students throughout Durham every day. They Manage to get their students on time almost every single school day.

== Demographics ==
As of the 2017–2018 school year there were 33,072 students enrolled in Durham Public Schools.

Durham Public Schools Student Demographics
	2003–04	2007–08	2008–09	2009–10	2010–11	2016-2017	2017-2018	2023-2024
Black	56.53%	53.86%	na	52.52%	52.12%	46.7%	44.7%	37.2%
White	29.2%	22.60%	na	21.36%	21.13%	18.6%	18.8%	19.5%
Hispanic	8.9%	17.11%	na	19.22%	20.97%	30.1%	30.7%	35.1%
Asian	2.4%	2.60%	na	2.62%	2.44%	2.3%	2.2%	2.1%
American Indian	0.3%	0.21%	na	0.22%	0.29%	0.3%	0.2%	0.1%
Multi-racial	2.9%	3.60%	na	4.06%	3.05%	2.8%	3.2%	5.9%
TOTAL	30,889	32,749	32,499	32,551	32,566	33,747	33,072	30,901

== Schools ==
=== High Schools (9-12) ===
==== Hillside ====
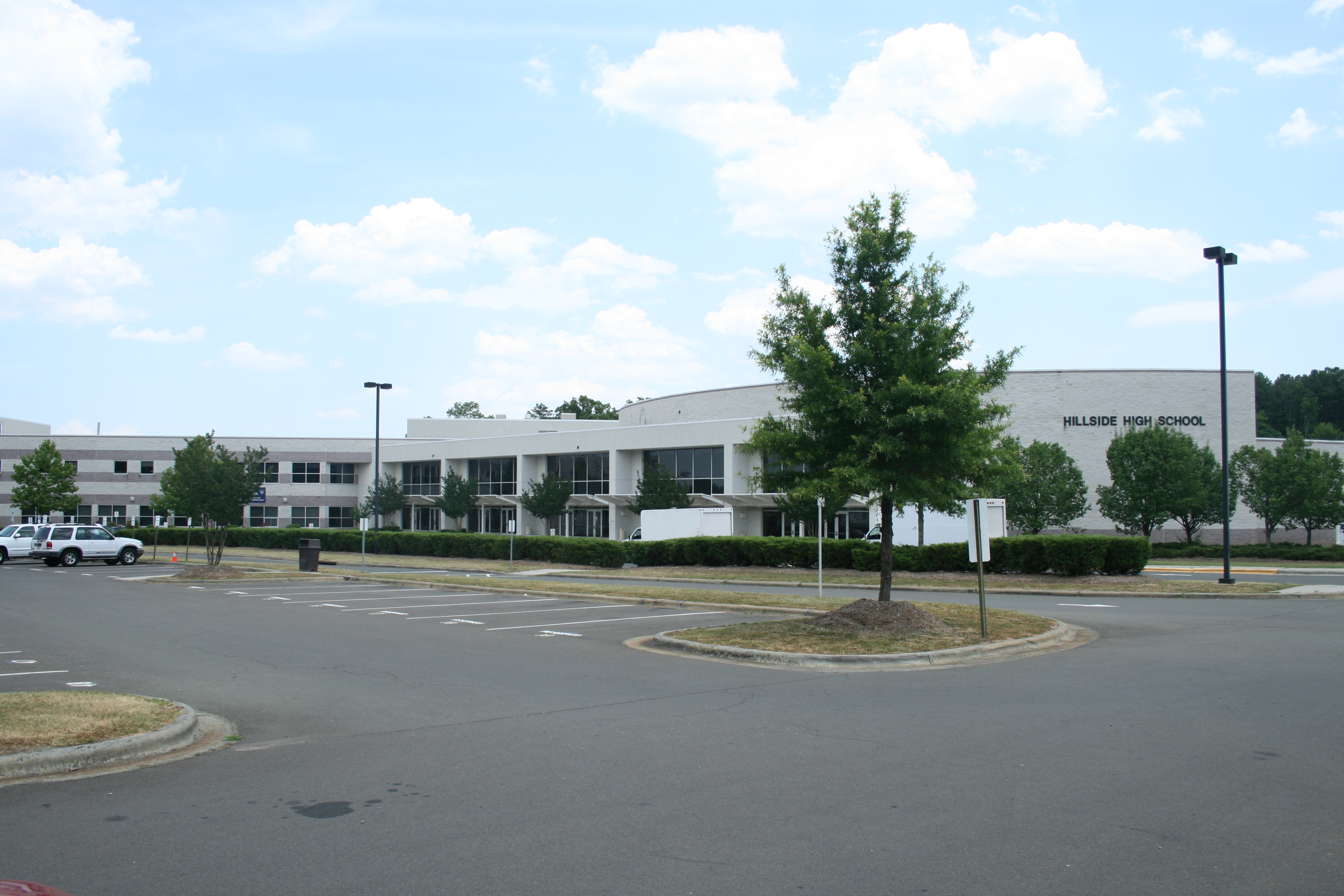
Hillside High School

Hillside High School is a four-year public high school. Of more than 300 historically black high schools that once operated in the state before desegregation, only five remain today, with Hillside being the oldest. The school features the International Baccalaureate Program and the Business and Finance Academy. "Students may study electronics, engineering, and child care through the Workforce Development courses, as well as traditional business classes". The school mascot is the hornet. Hillside is known for performing arts such as their award-winning Marching Band and Drama Department. Hillside students come from many middle school areas such as Rogers-Herr, Githens, Lowes Grove, Shepard, Brogden, and Lakewood. Hillside enrolled 1370 students in the 2017–2018 school year. The schools current principal is Dr. William Logan.

==== Jordan ====
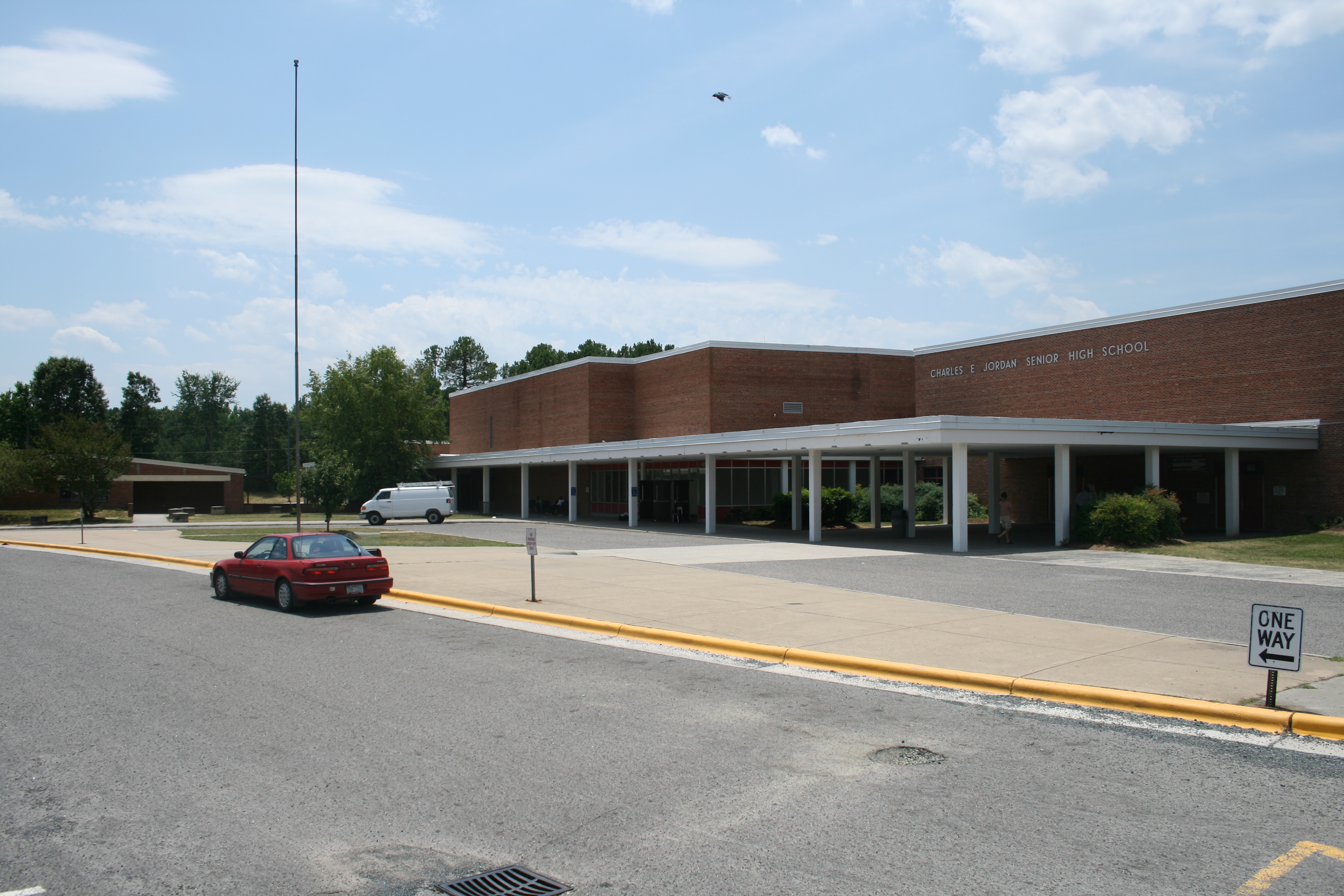
Charles E. Jordan High School

Charles E. Jordan High School is located on Garrett Road near Hope Valley Road in southwest Durham. The school mascot is the falcon. Jordan students come from many area middle schools such as Shepard, Githens, Lowe's Grove, and Rogers-Herr. The school features career pathways in Agriscience/Biotechnology and Commercial and Artistic Production. Other components of the Jordan community that have won national and state awards include the marching band, show choir, DECA (marketing and business), Future Farmers of America, Future Business Leaders of America, the foreign language program, and the school newspaper. Jordan enrolled 1,979 students in the 2017–2018 school year. The schools current principal is Susan Taylor.

==== Northern ====
Northern High School is a four-year public high school located in the northern part of Durham. Northern is one of Durham's seven public high schools. Students take 4 classes each day. Northern's mascot is a knight. Northern students come from some middle school such as Lucas, Brogden, and Carrington. Northern also offers specialty course programs like Culinary Arts, Astronomy, Sports Medicine, Mythology, and many more. Northern enrolled 1,536 students in the 2017–2018 school year. The schools current principal is Emmet Alexander. It is in the process of being rebuilt on a new site approximately two miles away.

==== Riverside ====
Riverside High School is a four-year public high school located in Northern Durham. Opened in 1991, this school is one of seven public high schools in the Durham Public School System. Riverside students come from some middle school areas such as Carrington, Brogden, and Lucas. Riverside is SACS & NCDPI accredited, has the Project Lead the Way (PLTW) Engineering Magnet, and the Air Force JROTC Magnet. Riverside enrolled 1,826 students in the 2017–2018 school year. The schools current principal is Gloria Woods-Weeks.

==== Southern ====
Southern High School is a four-year public high school located in southern Durham. Southern is a 4A school, and has football, baseball, and basketball programs as well as the Symphonic Soul of the South Marching Band. Southern students mostly come from Neal and Brogden. Durham Public Schools, with the support of the New Schools Project of the Bill and Melinda Gates Foundation, has reinvented the high school experience at Southern School of Energy & Sustainability. Southern enrolled 1,429 students in the 2017–2018 school year. The schools current principal is Jerome Leathers.

==== Middle College ====
Middle College High School is located on the campus of Durham Tech. This high school is only for juniors and seniors. There were 197 students during the 2017–2018 school year. The current principal is Crystal Taylor-Simon

==== Other High Schools ====
- Josephine Dobbs Clement Early College
- City of Medicine Academy
- Durham School of Technology (formerly Hillside New Tech High)

=== Middle Schools (6-8) ===
==== Brogden ====
Brogden Middle School is a public middle school in Durham, North Carolina. As of the 2023 – 2024 school year, Brogden serves 707 students from grades 6–8 in the Durham Public Schools district. The school is currently ran under the administration of principal Anthony White.

Willis J. Brogden Middle School
- 1001 Leon Street, Durham, North Carolina 27704; 27704; United States

Information
- Other name: BMS, Brogden
- Former names: Brogden Junior High School
- School type: Middle School
- Motto: "Let's Go Dragons!"
- Established: 1959 (67 years ago)
- School district: Durham Public Schools
- NCES District ID: 3701260
- Superintendent: Catty Moore (Intern)
- Principal: Anthony J. White
- Faculty: 94 (2023–2024)
- Teaching staff: 71 (2023–2024)
- Key people: 4
- Grades: 6–8
- Age range: 10-15
- Enrollment: 707 (2023–2024)
- Student to teacher ratio: 15:1
- Education system: NCDPI
- Schedule type: A-Day, B-Day Block Schedule
- Hours in school day: 7
- Student Union/Association: Durham Students In Support
- Colors: Green, White & Black
- Athletics conference: Durham Athletic Conference
- Sports: Soccer, Football, Basketball, Cross Country, Track & Field, Wrestling, Baseball, Softball
- Mascot: Dragons
- Nickname: Home of the Dragons
- Feeder schools: Hillandale, E.K. Powe
- Website: dpsnc.net/brogden

Brogden was built in 1959 on a parcel of land containing an abandoned farmhouse, which was razed to facilitate the construction of a school. The site was owned by the Northgate Shopping Center — a mall which operates near Broad Street as of 2024. The school was opened to grades 7–9 as a Junior High School in 1959 under the name Brogden Junior High. The newly constructed Brogden school was set to replace the E.K. Powe Junior High, which would later become the E.K. Powe Elementary school.

As of 2024, Brogden functions as a middle school. It holds many sports teams including boys and girls soccer, basketball, track & field, cross country as well as a football, volleyball, wrestling, baseball and softball team. In 2024, the Brogden Boys Soccer Teams won the Durham Athletics Conference championships for the first time in over 10 years. Brogden sponsors 3 performing arts classes, namely band, orchestra and chorus. The school's band has competed with the North Carolina Bandmaster's Association, and students have represented the school in the North Carolina All-State band. Choral students from Brogden have participated in the North Carolina All-State chorus. Brogden hosts various recitals through the year to allow band, orchestra and chorus students to perform.

==== Carrington ====
The Carrington Middle School is administrated by Debra Cheek. In the 2024 – 2025 school year, it had an enrollment of 776 students.

==== Githens ====
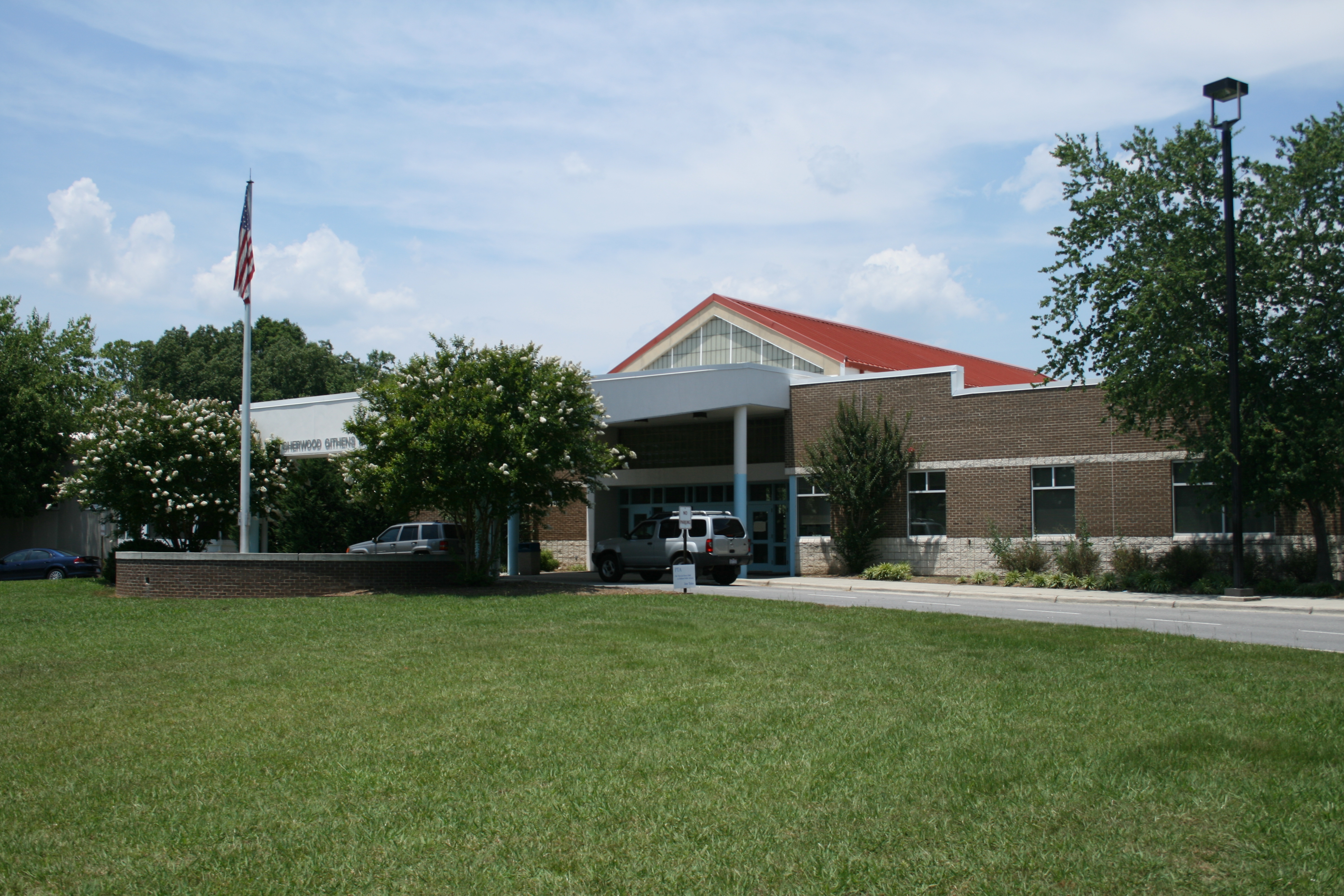
Githens Middle School

The Githens Middle School is administrated by principal Sheldon Lanier. In the 2021 – 2022 school year, it had an enrollment of 923 students.

==== Lowe's Grove ====
The Lowe's Grove Middle School is administrated by principal Jessica Austin. In the 2021 – 2022 school year, it had an enrollment of 601 students.

==== Lucas ====
The Lucas Middle School is administrated by principal Sarah Sanchez. In the 2021 – 2022 school year, it had an enrollment of 531 students.

==== Neal ====
The Neal Middle School is administrated by principal Terrence Covington. In the 2021 – 2022 school year, it had an enrollment of 759 students.

==== Rogers-Herr ====
The Rogers-Herr Middle School is administrated by principal Tawauna Stewart. In the 2021 – 2022 school year, it had an enrollment of 633 students.

==== James E Shepard IB Middle ====
The James E Shepard IB Middle School is administrated by principal Claude Archer. In the 2021 – 2022 school year, it had an enrollment of 452 students.

==== Lakewood Montessori Middle ====
The Lakewood Montessori Middle School is administrated by principal Donald Jones. In the 2021 – 2022 school year, it had an enrollment of 295 students.

=== K-12 Schools (K-12) ===
Durham Public K-12 Schools
Name	Principal	Mascot	Colors	Enrollment (2021–2022)
Ignite Online Academy	Crystal B. Medlin	The Ignite! Flight Dragon		500
Hospital School at Duke University Medical Center	Michael Somers			25

=== Secondary schools ===
==== Durham School of the Arts ====
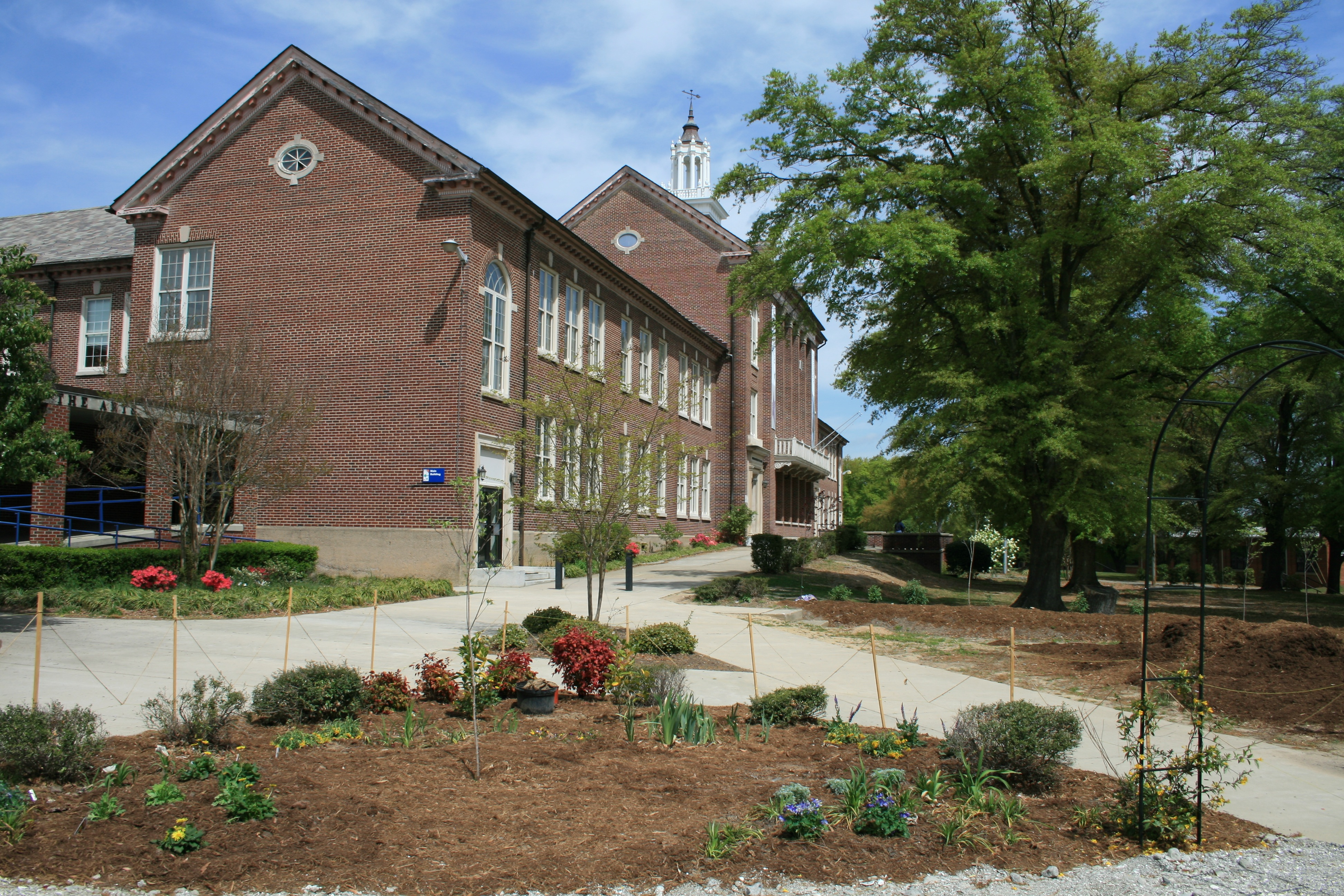
Durham School of the Arts

Durham School of the Arts (DSA) is a secondary (grades 6–12) magnet school located in downtown Durham, housing 1711 students. Its focus is on visual and performing arts. Offerings include extensive 3D and 2D art, dance, guitar, strings, band, photography, piano, acting, technical theater, and computer classes. Students are enrolled by a lottery system and can enroll as early as the sixth grade. It is led by principal L. Jackie Tobias.

==== Lakeview School ====
Lakeview School is an alternative school for grades 6–12 to teach those who have a history of misbehavior.. It is led by principal Theresa McGowan. Lakeview was an African American school prior to integration, then proceed to be an all kindergarten center which later changed to PIPE daycare for employees children and others.

==== Hospital School ====
- The Hospital School is located at Duke University Medical Center. This school teaches students with health conditions.

==== School for Creative Studies ====
The School for Creative Studies is a year-round secondary magnet school (grades 6–12) located at 5001 Red Mill Road, Durham, 27704. This school opened with 300 students (Grades 6, 7, 9) on July 1, 2013, in the same building that used to house Chewning Middle School. The principal is Chaundra Clay.

=== Elementary Schools (K-5) ===
Durham Public Elementary Schools
Name	Principal	Mascot	Enrollment (2021–2022)
Bethesda	Emory Wyckoff	Bulldog	686
Burton Magnet	Tiffany Boss	Ram	349
C. C. Spaulding	Vanessa Alford	Bald eagle	268
Club Boulevard Humanities Magnet	Jennifer Hall	Manatee	494
Creekside	Victoria Creamer	Eagle	889
Easley Year-Round	Jennifer Hauser	Eagle	565
Eastway	Jackaline Teel	Eagle	542
E. K. Powe	Robert Weldon	Eagle	476
Eno Valley	Dianna Robinson	Eagle	509
Fayetteville Street	Quincey Farmer	Lion	287
Forest View	James Boyce	Falcon	737
George Watts Montessori Magnet School	Jenn Aguilar	Wild Cats	350
Glenn	Matthew Hunt	Lion Pride	709
Hillandale	Michael Bloom	Hurricane	653
Holt Year-Round	Donya Jones	Eagle	656
Hope Valley	Ingrid Whitaker	Eagle	626
Lakewood Elementary	Jeri Jackson	Bulldog	450
Lyons Farm Elementary	James Hopkins	The Pride	439
Mangum	Gwendolyn Dorman	Pirates	307
Merrick-Moore	Deborah C. Brown	Tiger	607
Morehead Montessori School	Tyler Steketee	Meerkat	226
Murray-Massenburg Elementary School	Mshinda Middleton	Panthers	473
Oak Grove	Kristin Tate	Cougar	603
Parkwood	Jessica T. Perry	Panther	557
Pearsontown	Asia Cunningham	Panda	809
R.N. Harris Magnet	Catherine Lucas	Eagle	317
Southwest	Nicholas Rotosky	Seahawks	636
Spring Valley	Gwendolyn Wilson	Stinger the Bee	536
W.G. Pearson Elementary	Kendell L. Dorsey	Tiger	478
Y. E. Smith	Otis Maben	Tiger	386
Sandy Ridge Visual and Performing Arts	Lanisha Hinton	Stars	597

=== Middle Schools (6-8) ===
Durham Public Elementary Schools
Name	Principal	Mascot	Enrollment (2024–2025)
Brogden Middle	Desirae Smith	Dragon	
George L Carrington Middle	Debra Cheek	Cougar	
James E Shepard Middle	Claude Archer	Panthers	
Lakewood Montessori Middle	Shea Neville	?	
Lucas Middle	Sarah Sanchez	Leopard	
Lowe's Grove Middle	Letisha Judd Manning	?	
Neal Middle	Terrence Covington	?	
Sherwood Githens Middle	Crystal Cahill	?	
Rogers-Herr Middle	Tawauna Stewart	Ram	

=== K-8 Schools (K-8) ===
Durham Public K-8 Schools
Name	Principal	Mascot	Colors	Enrollment (2021–2022)
Little River School	Cory Hogans	Beaver		474

=== Former schools ===
- Lowes Grove Elementary School was in southern Durham. In 2016 the State Employees Credit Union proposed that Durham Public Schools build employee housing on the Lowes Grove property. In 2019 a bill was filed in the legislature to allow the district to do this.
- W.G. Pearson Middle School
- Chewning Year-Round Middle School
- Bragtown School

Was turned into a 6th grade center after integration. The last year it served as a school was 1990–1991 school year.

Durham Public School System's old logo
