= Indy Week =

Newspaper in Durham, North Carolina

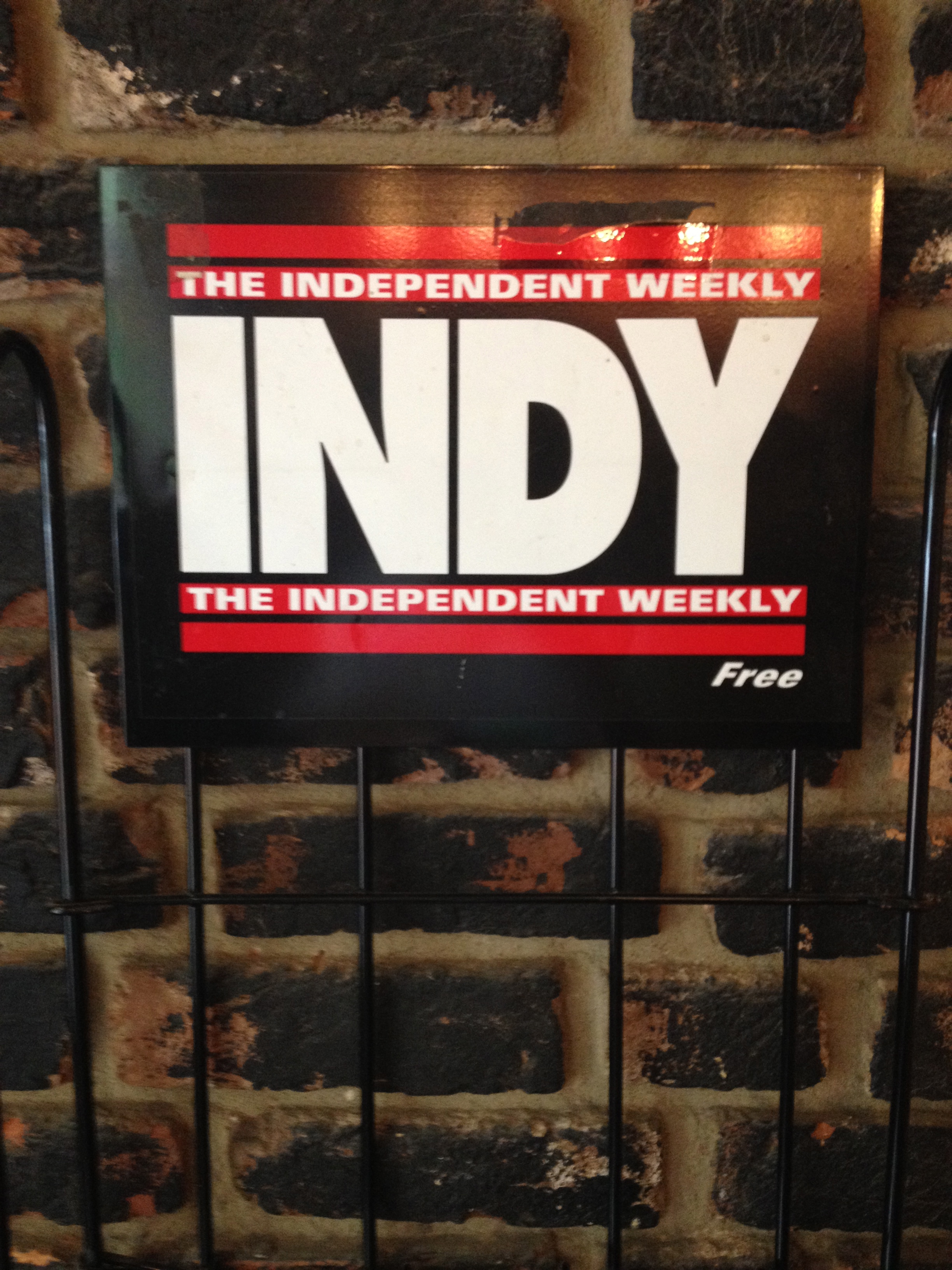
- Independent Weekly stand in coffee shop on Hillsborough St, Raleigh NC
- Type: Alternative weekly
- Format: Tabloid
- Owner(s): ZM INDY, Inc.
- Publisher: John Hurld
- Founded: April 1983
- Language: English
- Headquarters: P.O. Box 1772 Durham, NC 27702; United States
- Circulation: 25,000 (as of 2019)
- ISSN: 0737-8254
- Website: indyweek.com

Indy Week, formerly known as the Independent Weekly and originally the North Carolina Independent, is a tabloid-format alternative weekly newspaper published in Durham, North Carolina, United States, and distributed throughout the Research Triangle area (Raleigh, Durham, Chapel Hill, and Cary) and counties (Wake County, Durham County, Orange County, and Chatham County). Its first issue was published in April 1983.

Indy Week is a member of the Association of Alternative Newsmedia and has a progressive, liberal political perspective. The Columbia Journalism Review has credited the newspaper for having a "spine of steel." The print edition is published on Wednesdays.

== History ==
The paper was founded in 1983 by Steve Schewel and was originally published as the North Carolina Independent and was bi-weekly. Its publisher was Carolina Independent Publications, Inc. It was renamed the Independent effective March 1985. In April 1988 the Independent published endorsements of state political candidates for the upcoming Democratic Party's primary election. The paper admonished its readers not to vote for state senator Harold Hardison and in response a member of Hardison's campaign organization collected approximately 7,000 copies of the paper from newsstands in downtown Raleigh and dumped them in the trash. The Independent identified the person responsible and reported the story in its next edition. The story was reported by media across North Carolina, raising the newspaper's public profile. In 1989, publication was changed to weekly, and the name altered to the Independent Weekly.

In September 2002, Carolina Independent Publications acquired the area's other major weekly, the Spectator, from Creative Loafing Inc. Founded in 1978 by Godfrey Cheshire and others in Raleigh, the Spectator had been owned by Creative Loafing since 1997 and was well known for its coverage of the arts; the name lived on as the name of the Independent's calendar of events.

In 2010, the Independent presented the inaugural Hopscotch Music Festival in downtown Raleigh. The three-day annual event happens in September and features local, national and international bands.

On September 27, 2012, the Independent Weekly was purchased by ZM INDY, Inc., whose owners, Mark Zusman and Richard Meeker, also own Willamette Week. The name of the newspaper and website was changed to Indy Week.

On June 11, 2020, Jeffrey Billman was fired from his position as Editor. The stated reason was that he had failed to follow up on a sexual misconduct tip regarding a local restaurant that had been brought to his attention in May 2019. Possibly prompting the dismissal, the edit and design staff released a letter stating their unwillingness to work for Billman going forward. Jane Porter started as Editor-in-Chief in January 2021.

In 2023, the newspaper's owners entered a contract with The Assembly, a two-year-old digital newsmagazine focused on North Carolina, to help manage the Indy Week's business operations, with the option of acquiring it in the future.

== Awards ==
The paper's reporters have won several major awards, including the George Polk Award, the Investigative Reporters and Editors Award (finalist), the Green Eyeshade Award for the South's best journalism (grand prize, 1993; second place, 2004, 2005 & 2019), the Baltimore Sun's H.L. Mencken Writing Award, and the Casey Medal for Meritorious Journalism.

== See also ==
- The Santa Fe Reporter, also published by Richard Meeker and Mark Zusman
- Willamette Week (Willamette, OR), also published by Meeker & Zusman.

== Works cited ==
- Milstein, Michael (July 1988). "The Silver Volvo Newspaper Heist". Columbia Journalism Review. 27 (2): 8–10.
