= South by Southwest =

American annual film and music festival

- Logo since 2000

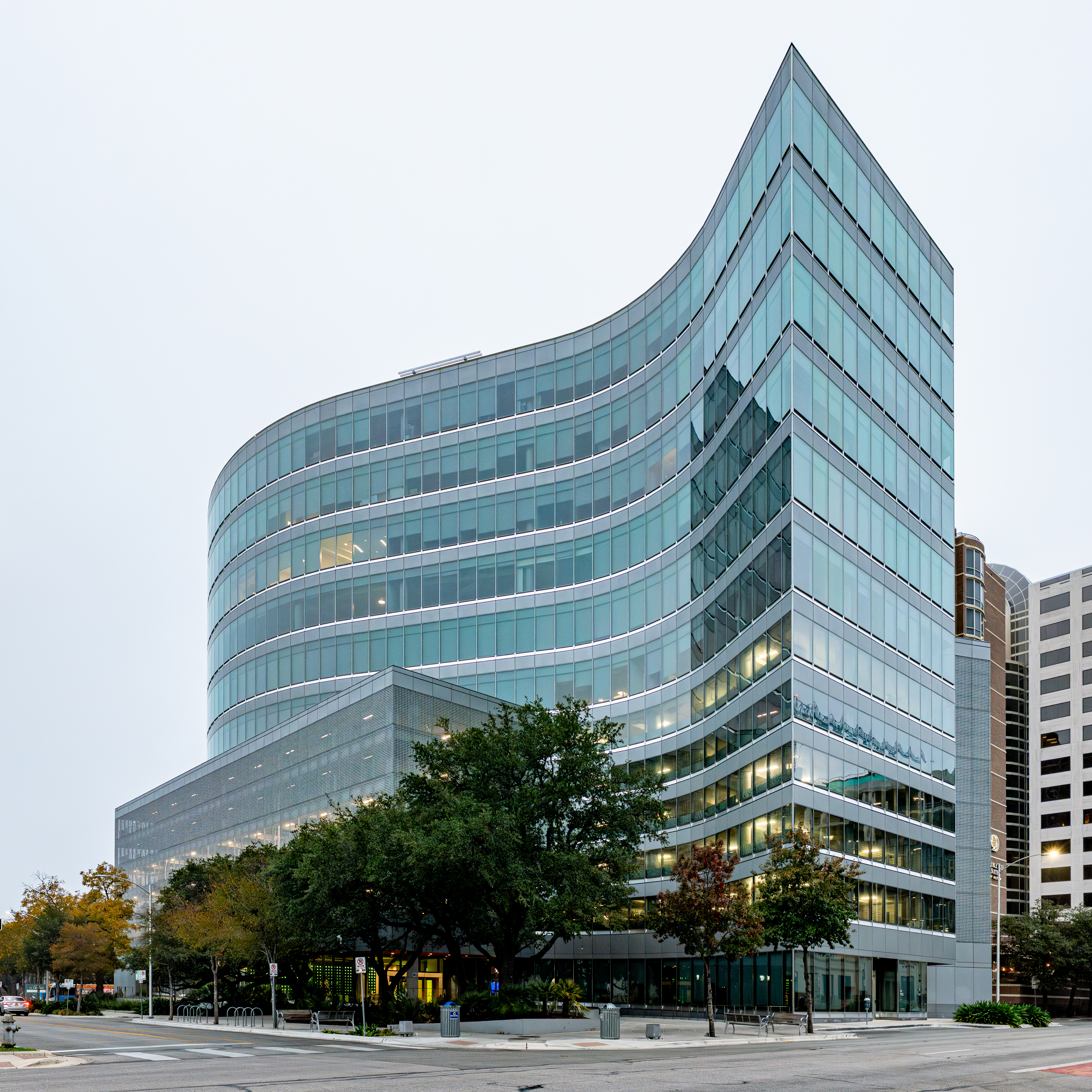
- The SXSW Center, headquarters of SXSW, located at 1400 Lavaca Street in Austin, Texas
- Genre: Conference and festival
- Dates: March (dates vary)
- Frequency: Annual
- Locations: Austin, Texas, U.S.
- Years active: 39
- Inaugurated: 1987
- Founders: Roland Swenson, Louis Jay Meyers, Louis Black, Nick Barbaro
- Next event: March 15–21, 2027
- Attendance: SXSW Music: 28,119; SXSW Interactive: 30,621; SXSW Film: 16,297; SXSW EDU: 4,260; Other Exhibits/Parties: 152,000
- Organizer: SXSW, LLC
- People: Jenny Connelly, director in charge, Hugh Forrest, former co-president and chief programming officer
- Website: sxsw.com
- 2026 South by Southwest Film & TV Festival

South by Southwest (SXSW) is an annual conference and festival that takes place in March in Austin, Texas, United States. Founded in 1987, SXSW features programming across technology, film and television, music, education, culture, gaming, and other creative industries. The event includes keynote and featured sessions, exhibitions, screenings, music showcases, networking opportunities, and more held across multiple venues throughout Austin.

SXSW is run by the company SXSW, LLC, which organizes conferences, trade shows, festivals, and other events. In addition to SXSW, the company runs the SXSW EDU conference and the SXSW London festival, and co-runs North by Northeast in Toronto, Canada. The company has previously run or co-run the events North by Northwest (1995–2001), West by Southwest (2006–2010), SXSW Eco (2011–2016), SXSW V2V (2013–2015), the me Convention (2017–2019) and SXSW Sydney (2023–2025). A large number of other events, past and present, sometimes collectively referred to as "four-letter festivals", have been inspired by SXSW.

The Austin Convention Center in Downtown Austin which functioned as the "hub" of the festival began renovations in 2025 and will reopen in 2029; South by Southwest will operate as a campus style event from 2026–2028 with events associated with the festival taking place at venues in and around Downtown Austin.

== Divisions ==
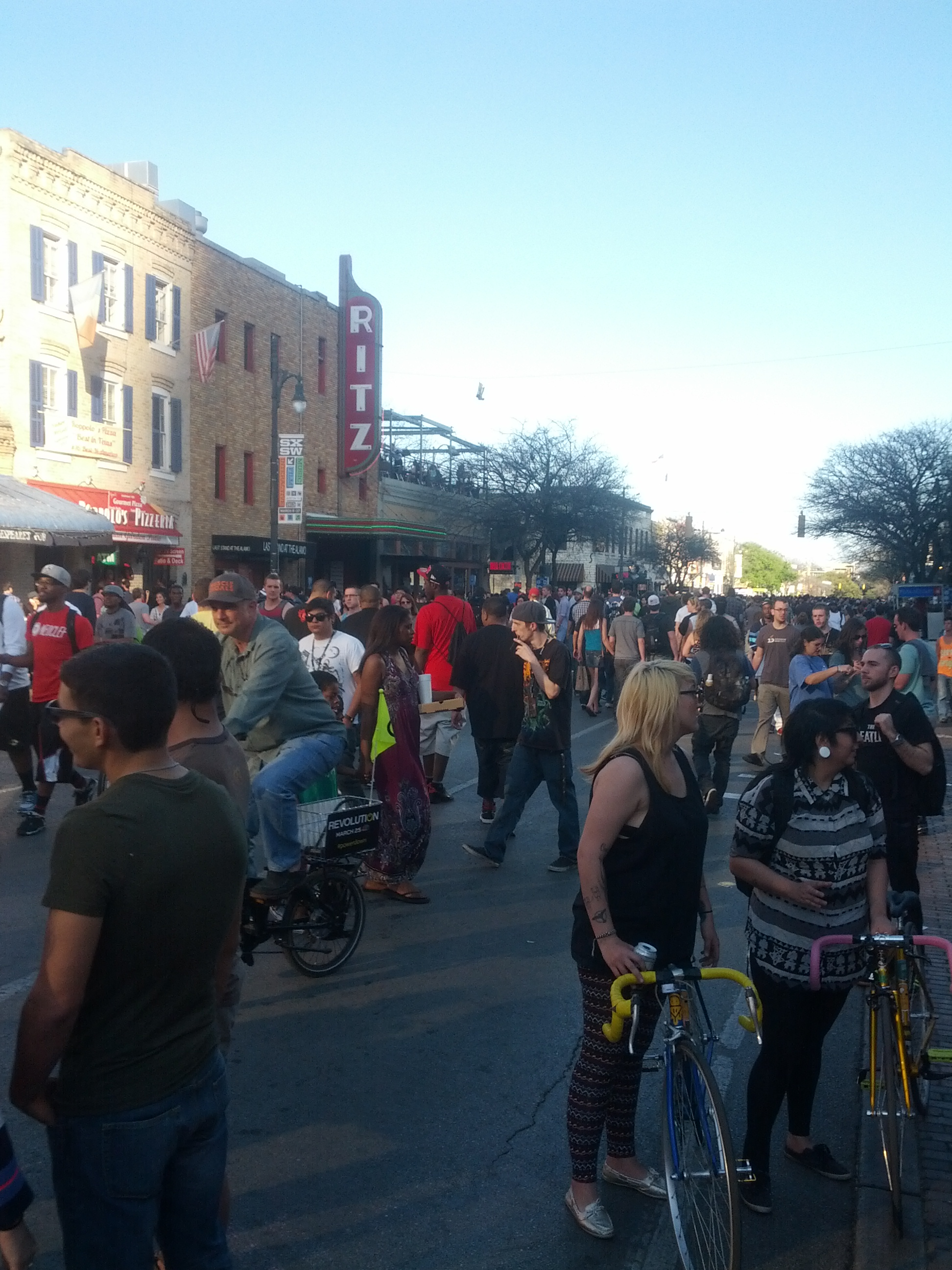
A view of 6th Street in downtown Austin, Texas, during SXSW 2013

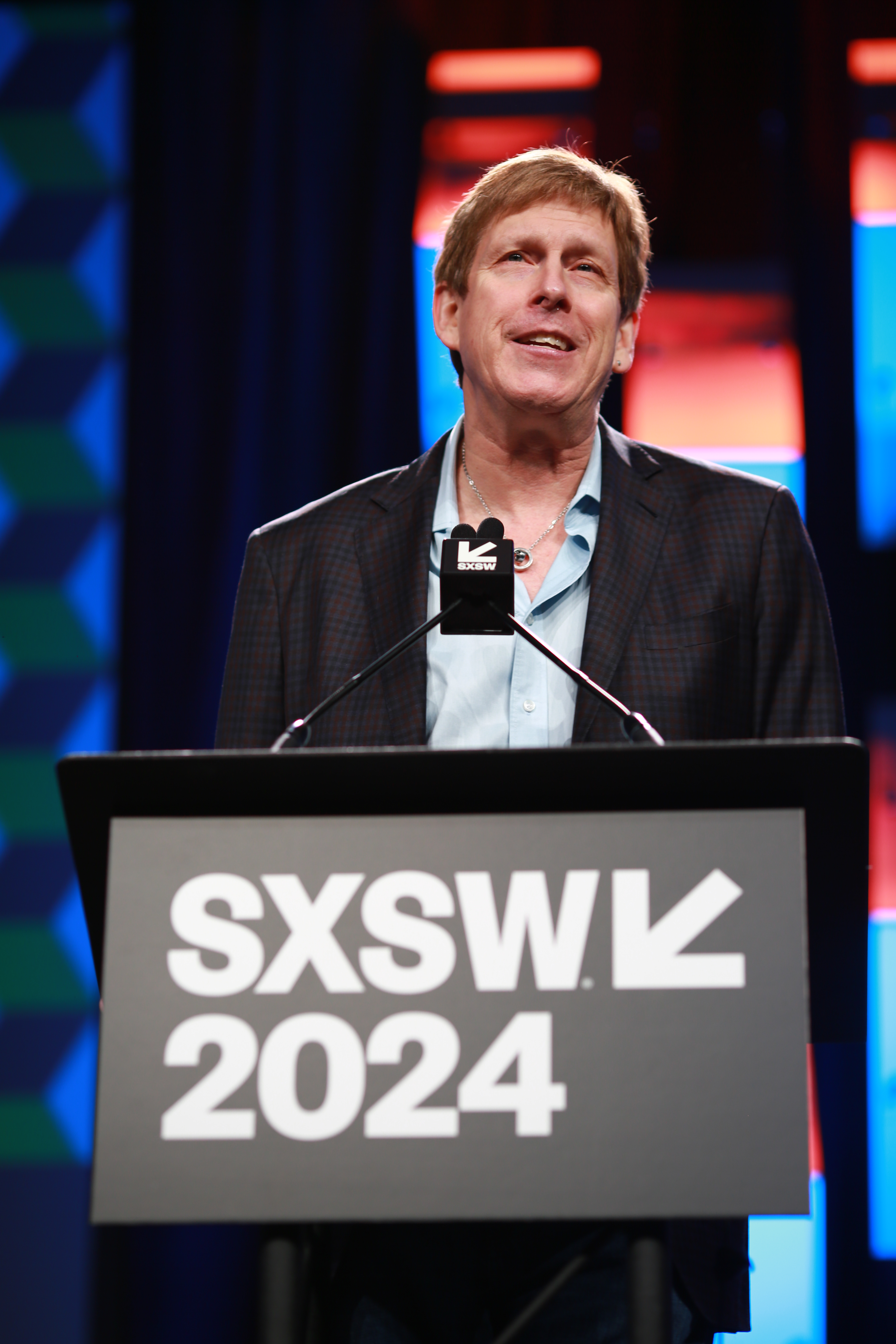
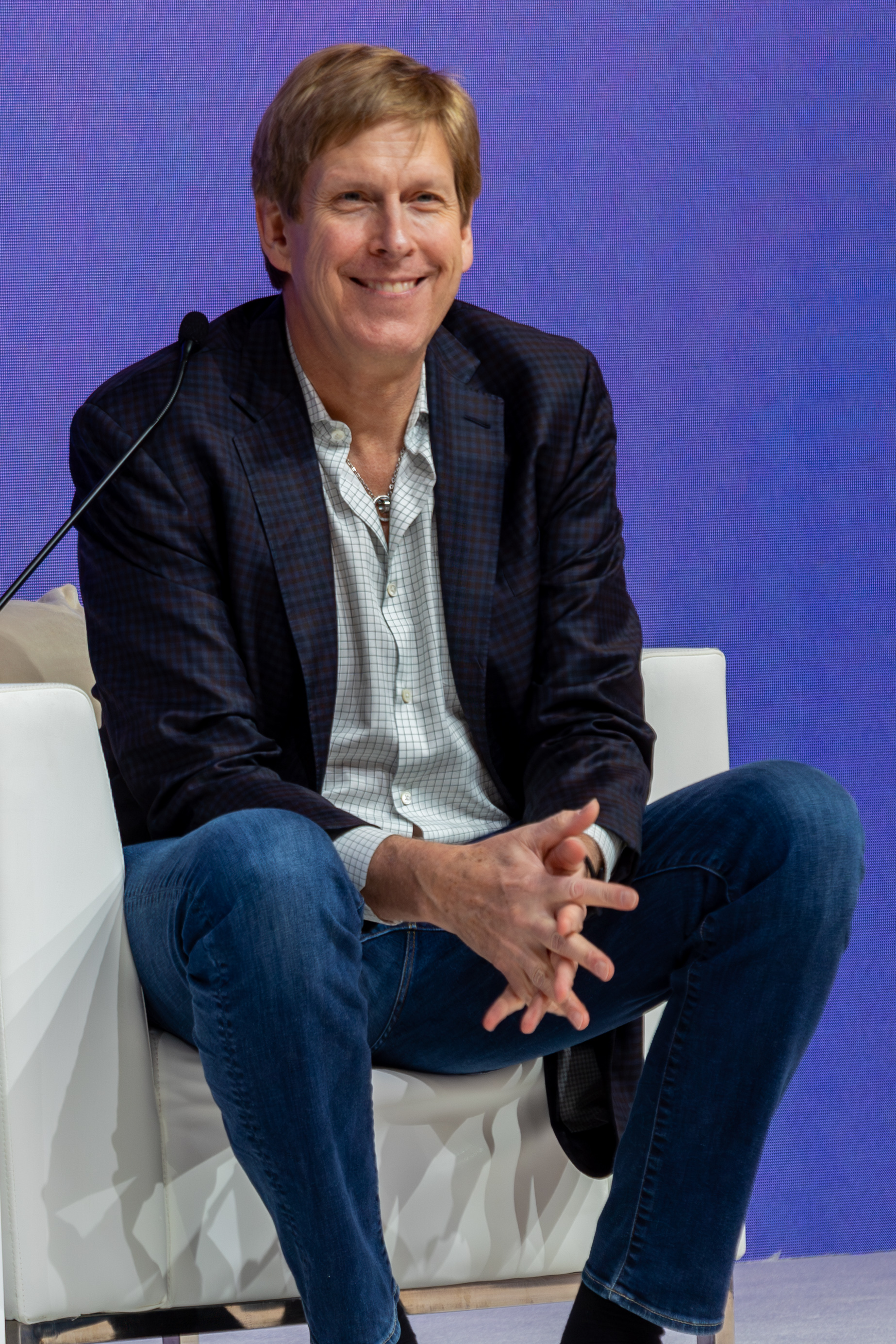
Hugh Forrest, former chief programming officer and co-CEO, at SXSW and the Dubai Future Forum (2024)

=== Music Festival & Conference ===
SXSW Music is the largest music festival of its kind in the world, with more than 2,000 acts as of 2014. SXSW Music offers artist-provided music and video samples of featured artists at each festival via their official YouTube channel.

The music event has grown from 700 registrants in 1987, the first year of the conference, to over 161,000 attendees in 2018. SXSW Film and SXSW Interactive events have grown every year, bringing over 32,000 registrants to Austin in March 2013.

Bands must cover their own expenses for travel and lodging at the event. All performers are offered a cash payment or a wristband package that allows access to all music events.

=== Film & TV Festival & Conference ===
SXSW Film Conference spans five days of conference panels and sessions, and welcomes filmmakers of all levels. Programming consists of keynote speakers, panels, workshops, mentor sessions and more, with expert filmmakers and industry leaders.

In 2015, the SXSW Film Conference programmed over 250 sessions with 735 speakers. Past speakers included Jon Favreau, Mark Duplass, Ava DuVernay, Ryan Gosling, Nicolas Cage, Alejandro Jodorowsky, Tilda Swinton, Amy Schumer, Sally Field, Joss Whedon, Christine Vachon, RZA, Matthew McConaughey, Danny Boyle, Seth MacFarlane, Catherine Hardwicke, Richard Linklater, David Gordon Green, Harmony Korine, Henry Rollins, Sarah Green and Robert Rodriguez. Although the film festival highlights independently produced films and emerging directing talent with unique visions, the festival has long served studios as a barometer for their comedies, with enthusiastic fans indicating how they might play in wide release.

The SXSW Film Festival runs nine days, simultaneously with the SXSW Film Conference, and celebrates raw innovation and emerging talent both behind and in front of the camera. Festival programming categories include: Special Events, Headliners, Narrative Spotlight, Documentary Spotlight, Narrative Competition, Documentary Competition, Visions, Midnighters, 24 Beats Per Second, SXGlobal, Episodic, Festival Favorites, and Short Film Programs. The SXSW Film Awards, which occur on the last day of the Film Conference, honor films selected by the Feature and Short Film Juries.

In 2015, the SXSW Film Festival programmed 150 feature films and 106 short films, selected from 7,361 submissions. Past world premieres included Furious 7, Neighbors, Chef, 21 Jump Street, The Cabin in the Woods, Dance of the Dead, Bridesmaids and Insidious, and the TV series Girls, Silicon Valley, and Penny Dreadful.

=== Innovation Conference ===
SXSW Innovation Conference (formerly SXSW Interactive Conference) focuses on emerging technology. The festival includes a trade show, speakers, parties, and a startup accelerator.

== History ==
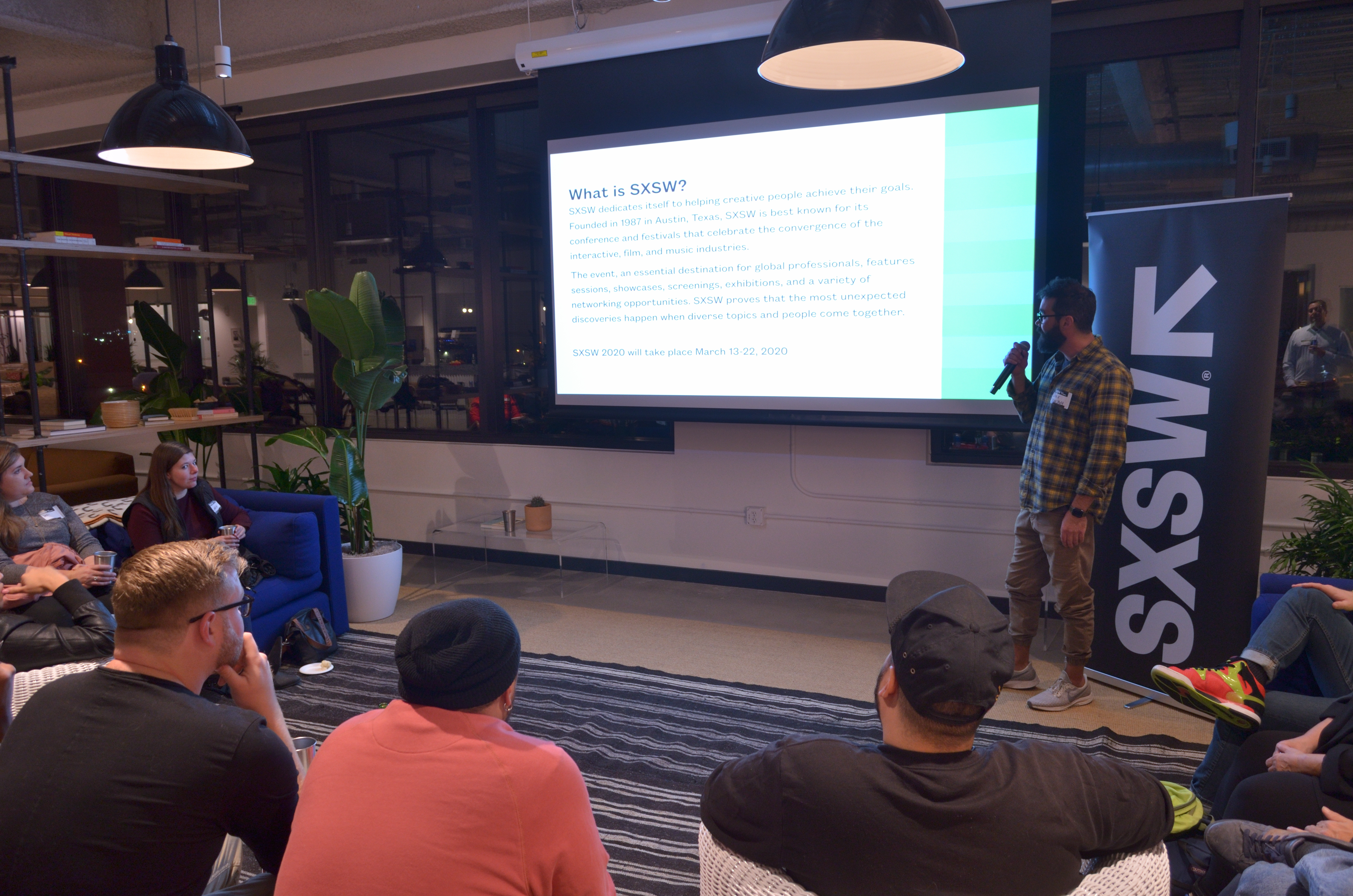
SXSW employee giving an introduction of the event

=== Inauguration in the 1980s ===
In July 1986, the organizers of the New York City music festival New Music Seminar contacted Roland Swenson, a staffer at the alternative weekly The Austin Chronicle, to talk about organizing an extension of that festival into Austin. They thereafter announced they were going to hold a "New Music Seminar Southwest". The plans did not materialize, however, so Swenson decided to instead co-organize a local music festival, with the help of two other people at the Chronicle: editor and co-founder Louis Black, and publisher Nick Barbaro. Louis Meyers, a booking agent and musician, was also brought on board. Black came up with the name, as a play on the name of the 1959 Alfred Hitchcock film North by Northwest. It should not be confused with "southwest by south" (SWbS), a point on a compass.

The event was first held in March 1987. The organizers considered it a regional event and expected around 150 attendees to show up, but over 700 came, and according to Black "it was national almost immediately." Meyers left Austin and the festival in the early 1990s, but Black, Barbaro and Swenson remained the festival's key organizers as of 2010.

=== 1990s ===
Singer-songwriter Michelle Shocked was the keynote speaker at the 1992 South by Southwest. She caused controversy by delivering a speech, written by her then-husband Bart Bull, criticizing white musicians for stealing music from African American artists; and then later during the same conference when she tried to kick the band Two Nice Girls off of a benefit concert, a move that some called anti-gay, due to Two Nice Girls' overtly lesbian image.

In 1993, SXSW moved into the Austin Convention Center.

In 1994, SXSW added a component for film and other media, named the "SXSW Film and Multimedia Conference". Johnny Cash was the keynote speaker.

That year, the three brothers of the band Hanson were brought to SXSW by their father in order to perform impromptu auditions for music executives, in the hopes of getting industry attention. Among the people who heard them was A&R executive Christopher Sabec, who became their manager, and would soon afterward get them signed to Mercury Records.

In 1995, the SXSW Film and Multimedia Conference was split into two separate events, "SXSW Film" and "SXSW Multimedia". In 1999, SXSW Multimedia was renamed "SXSW Interactive".

=== 2000s ===
Singer-songwriter John Mayer's performance at the 2000 SXSW Music festival led to his signing soon thereafter with Aware Records, his first record label.

A performance by the band The Polyphonic Spree at the 2002 SXSW Music festival helped bring them to national attention before they had signed with a major label.

At the 2002 SXSW Film Festival, the film Manito won the jury award for narrative feature, while the documentary Spellbound won the jury award for documentary feature.

British singer James Blunt was discovered by producer Linda Perry while playing a small show at the 2004 SXSW Music festival, and was signed to Perry's Custard Records soon thereafter, where he would go on to release all three of his subsequent albums.

The 2005 SXSW Film is considered by some to be the origin of the mumblecore film genre. A number of films now classified as mumblecore, including The Puffy Chair, Kissing on the Mouth, Four Eyed Monsters and Mutual Appreciation, were screened, and Eric Masunaga, a musician and the sound editor on Mutual Appreciation, is credited with coining the term "mumblecore" at a bar while at the festival.

The film Hooligans won both the Feature Film Jury Award and the Feature Film Audience Award for narrative feature, while The Puffy Chair won the Feature Film Audience Award in the "Emerging Visions" category. The documentary film Cowboy del Amor won the SXSW Competition Award and the Audience Award.

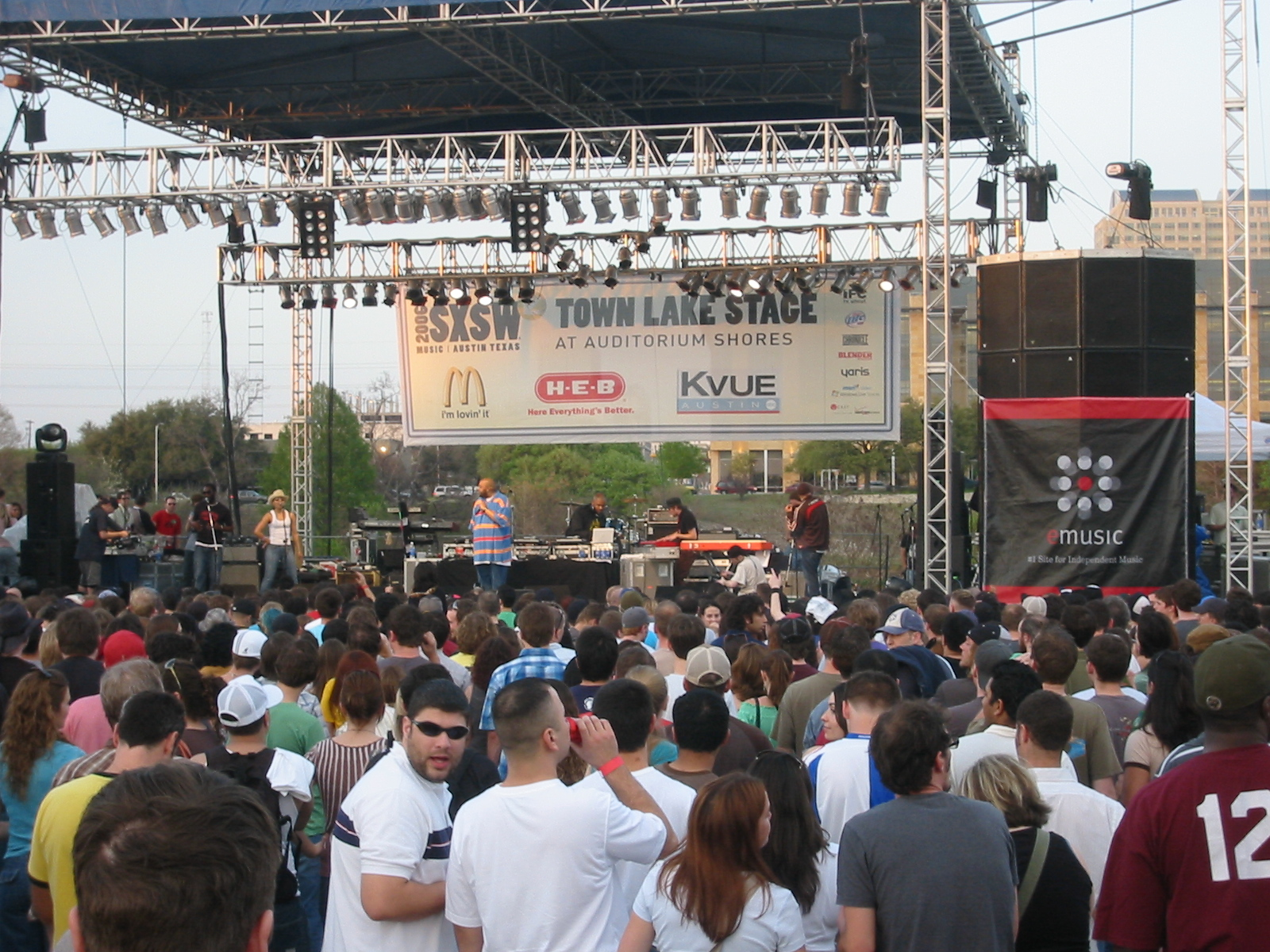
Blackalicious and Lateef performing at South by Southwest 2006

A secret concert at the 2006 SXSW Music by the band The Flaming Lips was called one of the "Top 10 Music-Festival Moments" of all time by Time magazine in 2010.

The 2006 SXSW Interactive featured a keynote panel of Wikipedia co-founder Jimmy Wales and Craigslist founder Craig Newmark.

That year, "Screenburn at SXSW", a component for video games, was added to SXSW Interactive.

==== 2007 ====
The 2007 music festival took place from March 14 to 18, and more than 1,400 acts performed. Two of the top film premieres that year were Elvis and Anabelle and Skills Like This.

The social media platform Twitter notably gained a good deal of early traction and buzz at the 2007 SXSW Interactive, though it did not launch at SXSW 2007 as is sometimes reported.

==== 2008 ====
The 2008 SXSW Interactive got media attention due to a keynote interview of Facebook CEO Mark Zuckerberg by technology journalist Sarah Lacy that was considered by some observers to be a "train wreck" due to an audience perception that Lacy was asking uninteresting questions, as well as mocking or terse answers in response from Zuckerberg.

In 2008, a comedy element was added to SXSW; it was held for one night. (By 2012, comedy performances occurred on all nights of the festival.)

==== 2009 ====
The 2009 festival was held March 13–22. The Interactive section of SXSW in particular drew larger attendance levels; the influx strained the networks of providers such as AT&T (primarily due to heavy iPhone usage). Also new was the founding of an international organization for those not attending, dubbed NotAtSXSW. Coordinating through Twitter and other online tools, notatsxsw events were held in London, New York, Wisconsin, Portland, Oregon and Miami.

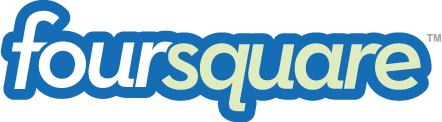
The mobile app, Foursquare, was launched at SXSW 2009.

The 2009 SXSW Interactive saw the launch of the Foursquare application, which was called "the breakout mobile app" of the event by the Mashable blog.

In 2009, the first Indian classical music artists performed at SXSW: Canadians Cassius Khan and Amika Kushwaha.

The 2009 SXSW Film screened 250 films, including 54 world premieres. The event was notable for having the United States premiere of the film The Hurt Locker, which went on to win the Academy Award for Best Picture in 2010. The winners of the feature jury awards were, for documentary feature, 45365, and for narrative feature, Made in China.

=== 2010s ===
==== 2010 ====
The 2010 music festival, which took place March 12–21, was dedicated to Alex Chilton, who died shortly before he was to perform with Big Star. A tribute concert was performed in his honor on March 20, 2010.

At the 2010 festival, nearly 2,000 bands were officially scheduled to perform, and festival reps estimated that over 13,000 industry representatives attended. Though traditionally the Austin Music Awards kick off the festival, that year organizers slated it as the closing act. Local musician Bob Schneider earned 6 awards, including Song of the Year, Singer of the Year, and Band of the Year (with Lonelyland.) The 2010 festival was also notable for appearances by the surviving members of the band Moby Grape.

At the 2010 Film festival, Magnolia Pictures bought the film rights to the science-fiction film Monsters on the night it screened, in what was the first-ever "overnight acquisition" at SXSW. Journalist Meredith Melnick of Time magazine called this purchase a turning point for SXSW, leading to a greater interest among film studio executives in attending the festival in person. That year also saw the premiere of the indie favorite Tiny Furniture, which won the award for Best Narrative Feature.

The 2010 Interactive festival had an estimated 12–13,000 paying attendees, which represented a 40% jump over the previous year. This was the first year in which the interactive festival's attendance surpassed the music festival's. The keynote presentation was an interview of then-Twitter CEO Evan Williams by Umair Haque, an interview that many in the audience found disappointingly superficial.

==== 2011 ====
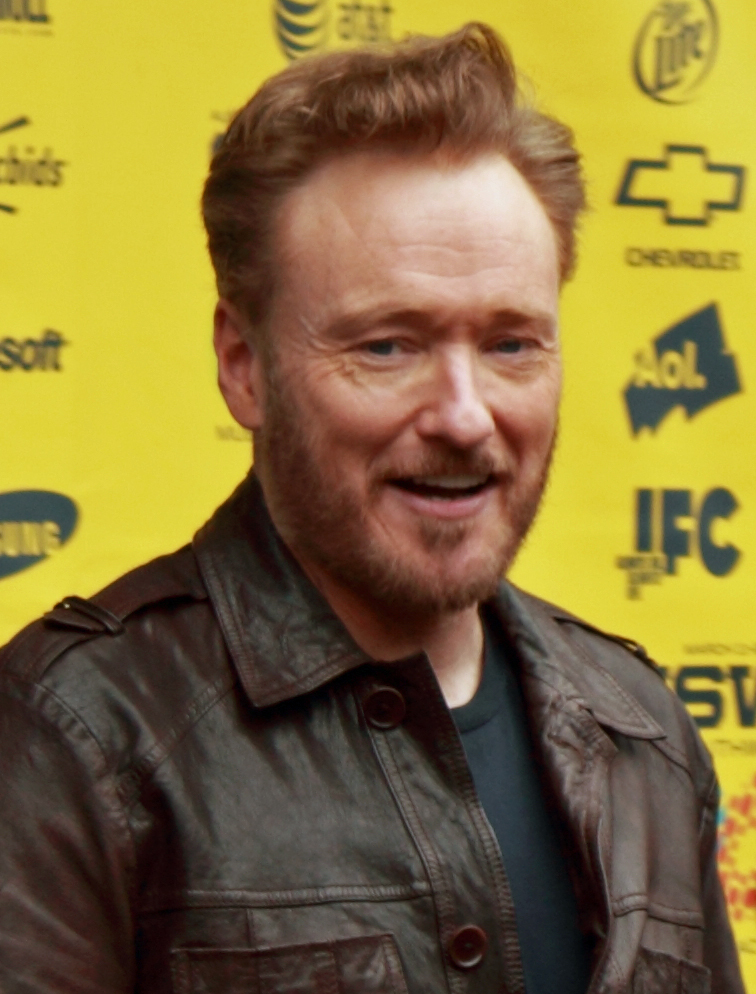
Conan O'Brien promoting Conan O'Brien Can't Stop at SXSW 2011

The 2011 SXSW festival ran from March 11 to 20. The keynote presenter for SXSW Interactive was Seth Priebatsch, founder and CEO of the mobile-gaming platform SCVNGR. The 2011 Interactive festival was by far the largest it had ever been, with an estimated 20,000 attendees.

Also in attendance at SXSW was boxing legend Mike Tyson, promoting his new iPhone game with RockLive at the Screenburn Arcade.

At least two films screened at the SXSW Film festival gained distribution deals: the documentary Undefeated (which went on to win the Academy Award for Best Documentary Feature) and the thriller The Divide. As a result, film critic Christopher Kelly wrote that in 2011, SXSW Film went from being "a well-regarded but fundamentally regional event" to having "joined the big leagues of film festivals around the world." That festival was also notable for having the premiere of the film Bridesmaids.

The March 15 screening of the Foo Fighters documentary Back and Forth was followed by a surprise live performance by the band itself, with a setlist that included the entirety of the then-upcoming album Wasting Light.

==== 2012 ====
SXSW 2012 ran from March 9 to 18. The standout technology of the 2012 SXSW Interactive was generally stated to be "social discovery" mobile apps, which let users locate other nearby users. Social discovery apps that had a presence at SXSW included Highlight, Glancee, Sonar and Kismet.

SXSW Film saw the premiere of two major Hollywood films: The Cabin in the Woods and 21 Jump Street. Two films obtained distribution deals: Girls Against Boys and The Tall Man. Another film, Gimme the Loot, which won the SXSW Narrative Feature Grand Jury Prize, got a distribution deal a week after the festival. Bay of All Saints received the Audience Award for Best Feature Documentary.

2012 was also the first year the music portion was expanded to Tuesday. The musical festival included rappers such as Talib Kweli and Lil' Wayne, along with surprise appearances by Big Sean and Kanye West; indie bands that appeared included MENEW and The Shins. Bruce Springsteen was the keynote speaker for the music festival.

==== 2013 ====
SXSW 2013 ran from March 8 to 17. The big-budget films The Incredible Burt Wonderstone and Evil Dead premiered at the 2013 SXSW Film, and Spring Breakers had its U.S. premiere. The film Short Term 12 won the grand jury award for Best Narrative Feature. The films Awful Nice, Cheap Thrills, and Haunter received distribution deals, and Drinking Buddies obtained a distribution deal several days later.

The 2013 SXSW Interactive saw another huge jump in registration, now with 30,621 paying attendees. This was over three times the number that had attended in 2008 (9,000), just five years previously. The keynote talk for the 2013 SXSW Interactive was given by SpaceX CEO Elon Musk. The "Screenburn" and "Arcade" components were renamed to "SXSW Gaming" and "SXSW Gaming Expo", respectively. The Interactive conference had an increased corporate presence, featuring major participation by Samsung, 3M, Target, American Airlines, Adobe Systems and AT&T, among others. According to CNN, CBS and CNET called Grumpy Cat the undisputed "biggest star" of SXSW Interactive over Musk, Al Gore and Neil Gaiman.

==== 2014 ====
SXSW 2014 ran from March 7 to 16. SXSW Film had premieres of the big-budget films Neighbors, Veronica Mars and Chef, and Cesar Chavez had its North American premiere. A clip for the big-budget film Godzilla was also screened. The films Space Station 76 and Exists got distribution deals at the festival, while Fort Tilden (which won the Narrative Feature Grand Jury Prize) and Open Windows got distribution deals shortly afterward.

A new section, "Episodic" (on television programming), was introduced to SXSW Film. Television series that previewed at the festival include Silicon Valley and From Dusk till Dawn: The Series. The talk show Jimmy Kimmel Live! was taped for a week at the festival; it joined the talk show Watch What Happens: Live, which began taping at SXSW in 2013.

SXSW Interactive featured a keynote speech by NSA leaker Edward Snowden, via streaming video, about privacy rights. The festival also featured a talk from another famous leaker, Julian Assange, also speaking remotely. Besides privacy issues, another major focus of the Interactive festival was wearable technology, including devices for augmented reality, activity tracking, identity authentication, charging cell phones and others. Computerworld magazine called the Oculus Rift, a virtual reality gaming headset, the "sleeper hit" of the festival, although it was displayed not at the Interactive but at the Film portion, as part of a Game of Thrones exhibit. The SXSW Gaming section introduced its SXSW Gaming Awards to recognize achievement in video and other types of gaming, which has continued through future SXSW festivals.

The keynote presenter and headline act this year for Stubb's was Lady Gaga. To promote her upcoming album, Food, Kelis cooked and served barbecue-style food from a food truck to festival attendees.

On March 13, 2014, a drunk driver, Rashad Charjuan Owens, drove his car into a crowd of festival attendees while trying to evade a traffic stop. Two people were killed immediately, another two died later from their injuries and another 21 were injured but survived. Owens was convicted of capital murder charges after a November 2015 trial in which eyewitnesses testified that about "a chaotic and harrowing scene" on the night, as hundreds of people ran and screamed as the car sped through crowds of people. Owens was given an automatic sentence of life imprisonment without the possibility of parole.

On March 15, 2014, rapper Tyler, the Creator was arrested on misdemeanor charges of "inciting to riot" after yelling to fans to push their way past security guards at a sold-out show the previous day. In February 2016, the riot charges were dropped against Tyler, The Creator pursuant to a plea agreement with prosecutors (under which the rapper pleaded guilty to the lesser offense of disorderly conduct and paid a $100 fine, with the case to be dismissed if he stays out of trouble for three months).

==== 2015 ====
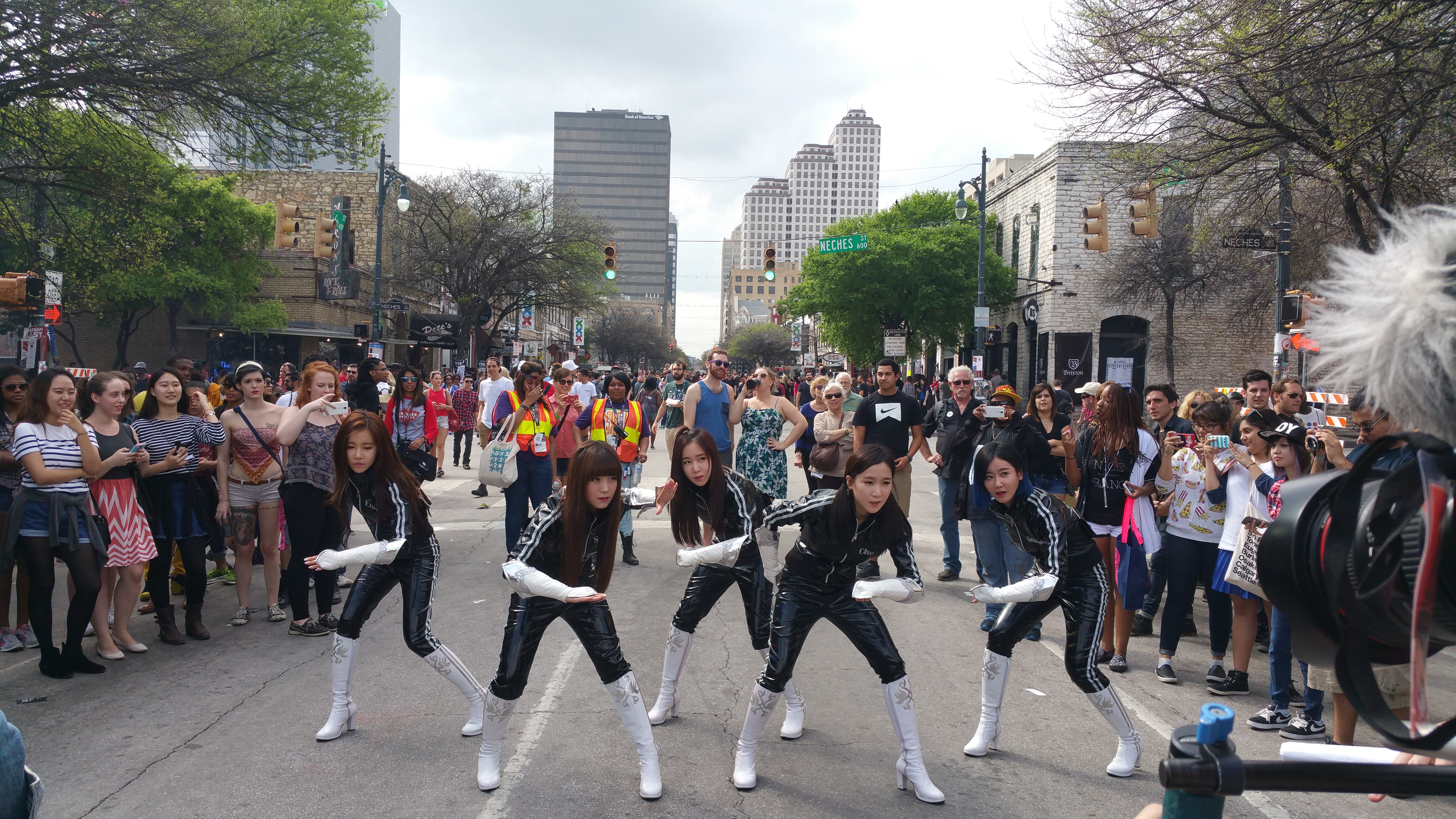
Crayon Pop filming "Can't Stop Crayon Pop" for Funny or Die before K-Pop Night Out at SXSW 2015

SXSW 2015 took place from March 13 to 22. SXSW Film screened 145 feature films, an all-time high for the festival. The big-budget films Furious 7 (which was a last-minute addition to the lineup), Get Hard, Spy, a rough cut of Trainwreck, Moonwalkers and The Final Girls had their world premieres, as did the documentaries Danny Says, Steve Jobs: The Man in the Machine and Brand: A Second Coming. Ex Machina had its North American premiere. 6 Years, Manson Family Vacation and Steve Jobs: The Man in the Machine all got distribution deals at the festival.

The 2015 festival hosted the swearing-in ceremony of Michelle K. Lee as the new head of the United States Patent and Trademark Office (USPTO). Secretary of Commerce Penny Pritzker administered the oath of office to Lee at the festival on Friday, March 13.

Various sources called Meerkat, an iOS app that had launched two weeks earlier that lets users livestream video via Twitter, the breakout technology of SXSW Interactive. Another product that received significant buzz was a prototype of the roadable aircraft AeroMobil.

==== 2016 ====
SXSW 2016 began on March 11 and ended on March 20. On March 11, 2016, President Barack Obama gave a speech at SXSW Interactive in which he called on the technology industry to help solve many of America's problems, such as upgrading outdated networks, helping balance security and privacy, and the FBI–Apple encryption dispute.

Films that premiered at SXSW Film include Everybody Wants Some!!, Keanu, Pee-wee's Big Holiday, Sausage Party and Don't Think Twice.

On the night of March 20, gunshots rang out on 6th Street during SXSW, causing mass hysteria and panic. No injuries were reported and a man from Memphis, Tennessee was arrested with discharging a firearm and disturbing the peace.

Following a visit by then-President Barack Obama, SXSW collaborated with the Obama administration, the President's Committee on the Arts and Humanities, and the technology media company Futurism to host South by South Lawn on the South Lawn of the White House on October 3, 2016.

==== 2017 ====
Films that premiered at SXSW Film include Song to Song, Baby Driver, Atomic Blonde, Gemini, The Ballad of Lefty Brown. Spettacolo and The Disaster Artist. Television series that previewed include The Son, Dear White People and American Gods. To promote the Hulu original series The Handmaid's Tale, dozens of actresses silently walked the streets of downtown Austin costumed in red "handmaid" dresses. To promote the third season of the AMC original series Better Call Saul (a spin-off prequel of Breaking Bad), a pop-up "Los Pollos Hermanos" restaurant, representing the fictional fast food chain featured in both series, appeared in downtown Austin.

Guest speakers included former mayor of Newark, NJ and current Senator Cory Booker (D-New Jersey), political activist and commentator Van Jones and former Vice President Joe Biden, who spoke about his cancer research initiative. Nile Rodgers gave the keynote address for the music portion of the festival, while filmmakers Gareth Edwards and Lee Daniels gave the keynote presentations for the film portion.

Major companies and brands which exhibited at SXSW (many with standalone "brand activation" pavilions) included IBM, Intel, Panasonic, Nintendo, GE, Giorgio Armani, Mazda and National Geographic.

Major performers during the music component of the festival included Garth Brooks, Lana Del Rey, Lil Yachty, The Roots, The Avett Brothers, Willie Nelson, Solange Knowles, Rae Sremmurd, Cardiel, Migos, and The Chainsmokers, among others.

En route to SXSW 2017, Italian post-punk band Soviet Soviet, traveling on the Visa Waiver Program, was denied entry to the United States, detained overnight and deported after an immigration officer at Seattle–Tacoma International Airport claimed they were planning on conducting a paid performance, which would have required a work visa. The band presented a letter from their American record label stating that both their performances at KEXP (which was what had brought the band to Seattle) and at SXSW were for promotional purposes only, but this failed to convince officials at the airport. There was a "Contrabanned" showcase on March 17, featuring various artists and musicians (residents of the U.S. and Canada) who are natives of, or have family connections to, countries affected by the 2017 U.S. travel ban.

Uber and Lyft were not available to attendees because they had pulled out of Austin in May 2016 as a result of a city ordinance mandating fingerprint-based background checks for drivers of any ridesharing company. However, other services such as (locally based) RideAustin, Fasten and Fare, were available, although in high demand. Uber and Lyft resumed service in Austin in May 2017.

==== 2018 ====
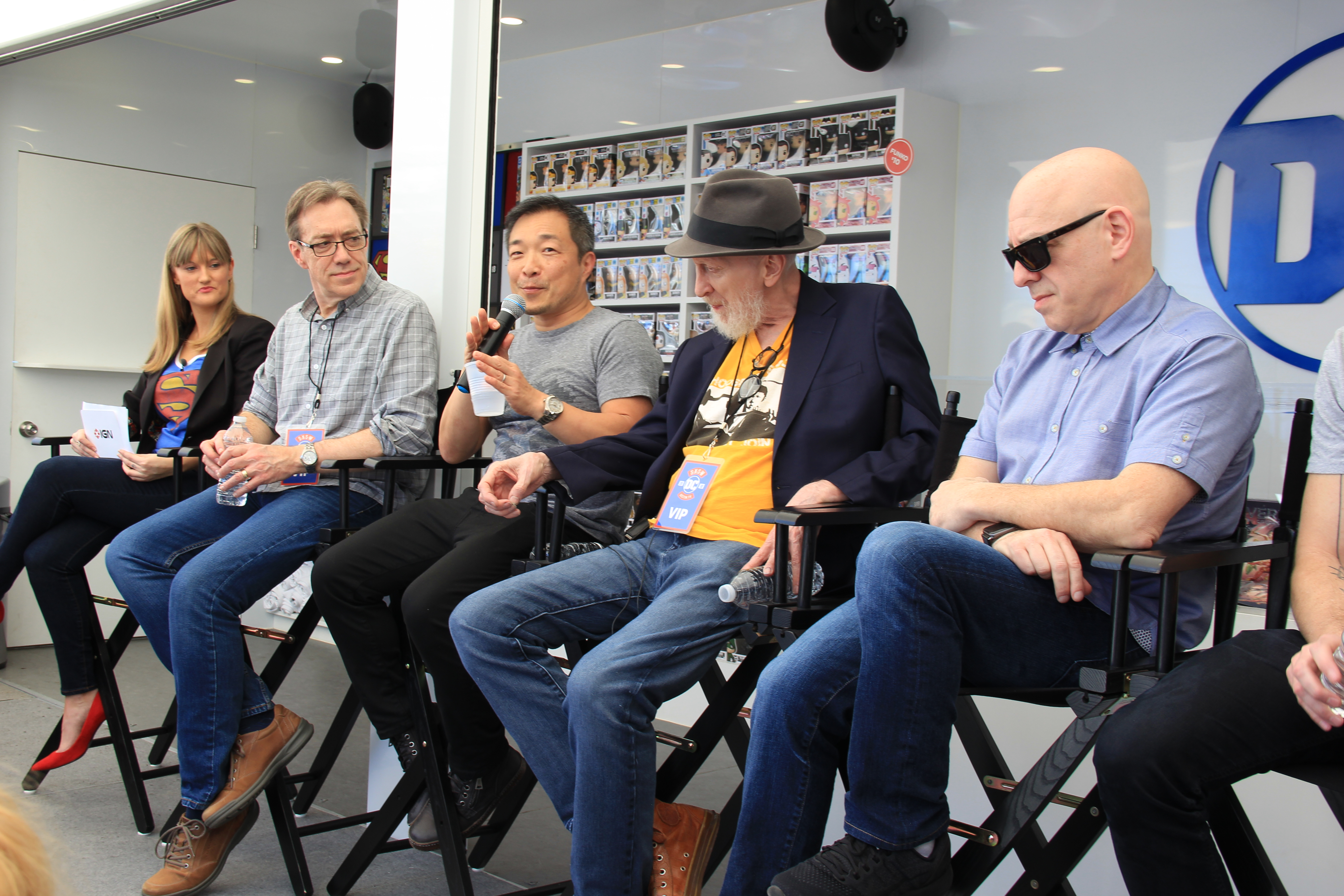
IGN's Laura Prudom (far left) hosts a panel at 2018's South by Southwest convention discussing Superman's eightieth anniversary and the release of Action Comics #1000, with (left to right): Dan Jurgens, Jim Lee, Frank Miller, and Brian Michael Bendis.

SXSW 2018 ran from March 9 to 18. Finalists of the 2018 SXSW Accelerator Pitch Event included Cambridge Cancer Genomics and Bluefield Technologies. Two winners of the event were Austin-based: GrubTubs (in the Hyper-Connected Communities category) and ICON 3D (in the Social and Culture category).

Guest speakers included politicians Bernie Sanders, Arnold Schwarzenegger and Sadiq Khan; journalists Christiane Amanpour and Ta-Nehisi Coates; filmmakers Barry Jenkins, Darren Aronofsky and Steven Spielberg; and others including Elon Musk and David Banner. Actor and comedian Bill Murray appeared at several unofficial functions during SXSW.

Major performers during SXSW Music included Tinashe, Rae Sremmurd, Rita Coolidge, Salt-N-Pepa and Khalid. There was an apparent increased emphasis on locally based performers, international acts and relative unknowns.

New games announced during the 2018 SXSW Gaming Expo included Sonic Mania Plus. At the SXSW Gaming Awards (held March 17), the award for Game of the Year went to The Legend of Zelda: Breath of the Wild.

Films that premiered at the 2018 South By Southwest Film Festival include A Quiet Place, Blockers, Ready Player One and the documentary feature and winner of a Special Jury Prize, Garry Winogrand: All Things Are Photographable. Films that had their U.S. premiere include Final Portrait and Who We Are Now. The film Thunder Road won the grand jury prize. TV series that previewed include Barry, Krypton, The Last O.G. and Cloak & Dagger. To promote the second season of the HBO series Westworld, a recreation of the show's fictional Western "town" of Sweetwater was built on two acres of open land just outside Austin. Fans took shuttles to the site, which was dressed in the Old West style, with over 60 actors playing the parts of the android "hosts".

SXSW 2018 coincided with a string of bombings in Austin, which had begun on March 2 and ended on March 21, when the presumed perpetrator, Mark Anthony Conditt, blew himself up after being discovered by police. Two of the bombings occurred during SXSW. On March 17, Live Nation Music, a company organizing events for SXSW, received a bomb threat via email. Police searched the area mentioned in the email and found nothing of concern, but planned performances by The Roots and Ludacris, among others, were canceled. Police arrested 26-year-old Trevor Weldon Ingram the next day; Ingram was charged with making a terroristic threat, a third-degree felony, in connection with the email.

==== 2019 ====
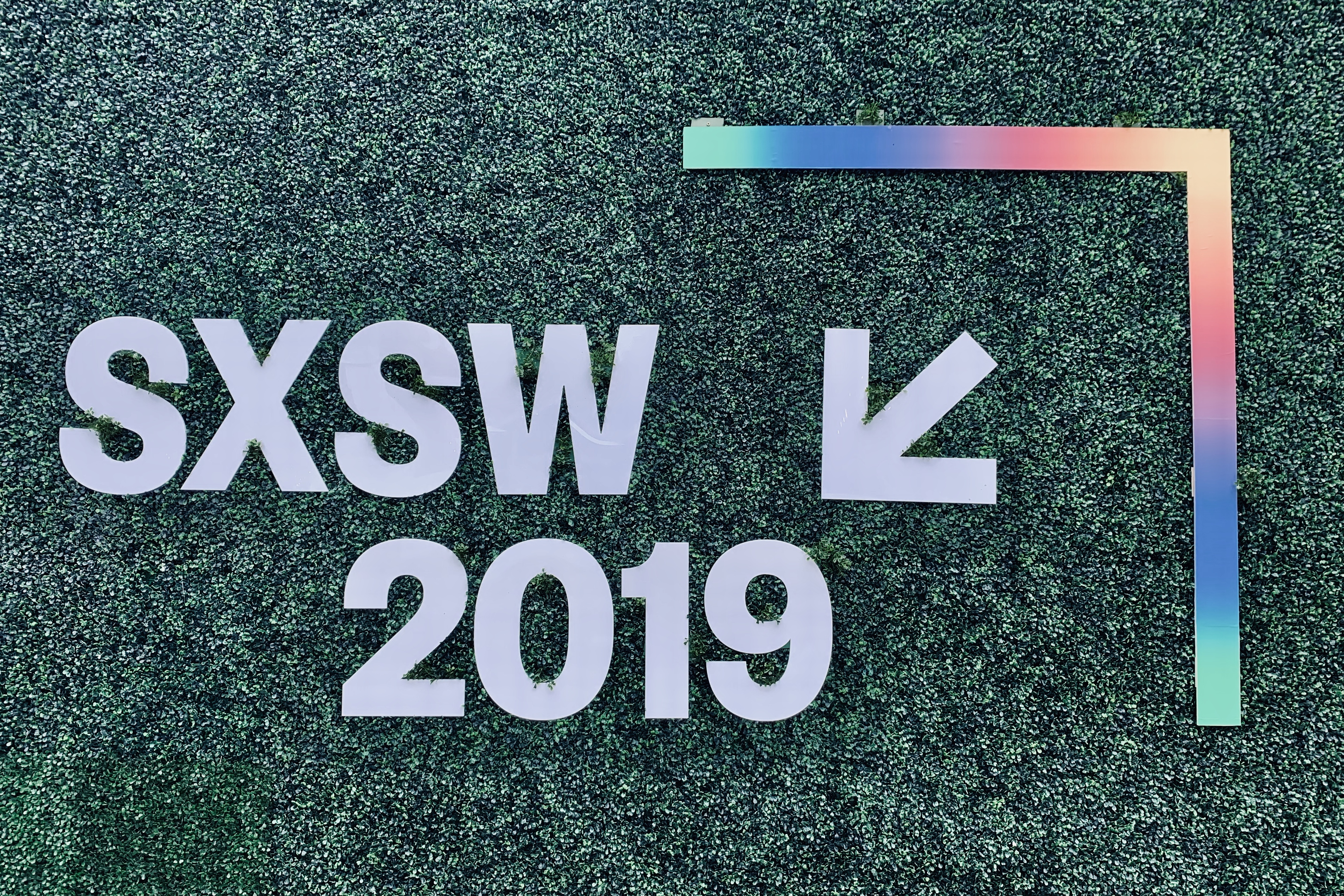
A logo used for the 2019 event

South by Southwest 2019 ran from March 8 to 17. Films entered at SXSW Film included Us, The Beach Bum, Long Shot, Booksmart and The Highwaymen. TV series that previewed included FX's What We Do in the Shadows, Hulu's Shrill and OWN's David Makes Man.

At the SXSW Gaming Awards (held March 16), the award for Game of the Year went to God of War. Major performers for SXSW Music included Edie Brickell & New Bohemians (their first-ever appearance at SXSW).

Winners of the 2019 SXSW Pitch event, in which emerging startups pitch to potential investors, included Derq, Pathway and ENZO Tyres. The "Best In Show" winner was Nebula Genomics; the "Best Bootstrap" award went to TwentyTables and the "Best Speed Pitch" went to Xplosion Tech.

Some of the first forums of the 2020 presidential race took place at SXSW, with Democratic presidential candidates Pete Buttigieg, Julian Castro, John Delaney, Tulsi Gabbard, John Hickenlooper, Jay Inslee, Amy Klobuchar, Beto O'Rourke, Elizabeth Warren and Andrew Yang all making appearances at the festival (though some had not yet announced their candidacy at the time). Other scheduled guest speakers included politicians Mazie Hirono and Alexandria Ocasio-Cortez; musicians David Byrne and Wyclef Jean; actors and comedians Aidy Bryant, Kathy Griffin, Ethan Hawke, Trevor Noah and Zoe Saldaña; businesspeople Tim Ferriss, Jeffrey Katzenberg and Guy Kawasaki; and others including Priscilla Chan, Neil Gaiman, Valerie Jarrett, Michael Mignano, Bill Nye, Dawn Ostroff, Robert Rodriguez and Maria Shriver.

To promote the final season of Game of Thrones, HBO organized a blood drive with the American Red Cross titled "Bleed for the Throne" which included actors in costumes similar to those on the series.

To promote the Amazon Prime original limited series Good Omens, a brand activation experience called "Garden of Earthly Delights" was installed in downtown Austin.

=== 2020s ===
==== 2020 ====
South by Southwest 2020 was scheduled to run from March 13 to 22, but was officially canceled on March 6 due to the COVID-19 pandemic in Austin, Texas, the result of an order by the city of Austin. The city's Mayor Steve Adler announced the cancellation of the 2020 SXSW and also declared a local disaster area.

In the month prior to the conference, SXSW organizers had resisted calls to cancel the conference. On February 28, a spokesperson said:

The SXSW 2020 event is proceeding as planned. Safety is a top priority for SXSW, and we work closely with local, state, and federal agencies year-round to plan for a safe event. Where travel has been impacted, especially in the case of China, we are seeing a handful of cancellations. However, we are on par with years past in regard to registrants who are unable to attend. We are increasing our efforts to prevent the spread of disease per Austin Public Health's recommendations. We will continue to monitor the situation closely and will provide updates as necessary.

However, in the run up to the conference, numerous companies and organizations canceled their SXSW attendance, including Twitter-, Facebook, Vevo, Intel, Mashable, Universal Music Group, Amazon, Entertainment Weekly, TikTok, SAP, Netflix, Apple, Indeed, WarnerMedia, The Washington Post, and IBM. Additionally, many individual attendees, headliners and speakers had decided not to attend, including keynote speaker Tim Ferriss and artists such as the Beastie Boys, Ozzy Osbourne and Trent Reznor.

An online petition called for SXSW 2020 to be canceled due to health concerns; by the time of the cancellation, it exceeded 50,000 signatures.

SXSW organizers said that they were "devastated" by the cancellation, stating that, "'The show must go on' is in our DNA." They wrote that they were attempting to reschedule the event, and were at the same time working to create an online SXSW for 2020.

SXSW co-founder Nick Barbaro said the organization did not have cancellation insurance relating to a disease pandemic or triggered by the city declaring a "local state of disaster."

Various unofficial SXSW events, as well as "alternative" SXSW events, did occur, in an attempt to help local workers and businesses who would be hurt most by the cancellation. The Austin Community Foundation also launched a "Stand with Austin Fund" for donations to "individuals and small businesses most negatively impacted by the cancellation of SXSW and least able to recover on their own."

On March 13, 2020, festival organizers announced that they would proceed with juried and special awards, with judges viewing submissions online. On March 24, the winners of the 2020 SXSW Gaming Awards were announced on the SXSW website, and the honorees recorded acceptance messages for the SXSW YouTube channel and website. Sekiro: Shadows Die Twice was awarded Video Game of the Year.

On April 2, SXSW announced a joint venture with Amazon Prime Video to launch a film festival collection. Filmmakers scheduled to screen films at SXSW were given the option to have their films play exclusively, and for free, on Prime Video in the U.S. for a 10-day "virtual film festival".

In May, SXSW organizers announced "SXSW Sessions Online", a weekly series of online discussions to run through June, with some of the previously announced guest speakers; each video session was streamed online with Q&A portions made available initially to those originally registered for the festival. All sessions were posted afterwards on the SXSW YouTube channel.

In April 2020, ticket holders filed a class-action lawsuit against SXSW over its refusal to issue refunds following the cancellation. The case was settled in February 2022. Under the settlement, eligible ticket holders who had not accepted an earlier deferral offer could choose between benefits for future festivals and a refund of 40 percent of their ticket price.

SXSW separately sued Federal Insurance Company over coverage for the ticket-holder litigation. On March 21, 2024, the United States Court of Appeals for the Fifth Circuit reversed a judgment in the insurer’s favor, holding that the disputed policy exclusions did not bar coverage, and remanded the case for further proceedings.

==== 2021 ====
Using a combination of technologies from Brightcove for B2C, and Shift72 for B2B, SXSW ran a virtual event from March 16 to 20.

Films and miniseries that premiered at SXSW include Demi Lovato: Dancing with the Devil, Hysterical, Jakob's Wife, Violet, Dear Mr. Brody, Here Before, The Fallout, The Lost Sons, Introducing, Selma Blair, Lily Topples the World, Not Going Quietly, The Return: Life After ISIS, Fruits of Labor and United States vs. Reality Winner.

Featured speakers included Samantha Bee, Richard Branson, Chiquis Rivera, Tim Ellis, Laurieann Gibson, Taraji P. Henson, Rana el Kaliouby, Matthew McConaughey, Adriene Mishler, and Alexi Pappas. Keynote addresses were given by Stacey Abrams, Pete Buttigieg and Willie Nelson.

In April 2021, Penske Media Corporation purchased a 50% stake in SXSW.

==== 2022 ====
South by Southwest 2022 ran from March 11 to 20. The SXSW Conference & Festivals and SXSW EDU drew total participation totalling approximately 278,681.

Organizers of SXSW planned for a hybrid event (in-person with online viewing and participation options); all registered in-person participants and attendees were required to provide proof of full vaccination against COVID-19, or a recent negative COVID-19 test, as a condition of receiving their badge. The Austin Convention Center, along with other event venues, upgraded air filtration and increased the cleaning and sanitizing frequency of high touch surfaces, including using UV light technology. Overall the event was slightly smaller than in previous (in-person) years with the core downtown area not quite as crowded (and therefore easier and faster to get around) and a smaller number of musical artists and overall content; significantly fewer major celebrities (especially musical acts) appeared than in previous years, although the film component seemed to celebrate a strong comeback after two years of virtual festivals.

Films that premiered at SXSW Film were Everything Everywhere All at Once, The Lost City, The Unbearable Weight of Massive Talent, Bodies Bodies Bodies, X, Apollo 10 1/2: A Space Age Childhood, I Love My Dad, Master of Light (winner of the documentary competition), and What We Leave Behind (winner of the Louis Black "Lone Star" and Fandor New Voices Awards). TV series previewed include WeCrashed (Apple TV+), the third season of FX's Atlanta, Halo (Paramount+), and The Last Movie Stars (CNN+).

At the SXSW Gaming Awards (held March 12), the award for Game of the Year went to Final Fantasy XIV: Endwalker (Square Enix); it also took home awards for Excellence in Narrative and Excellence in Original Score. (2022 would be the final year to date for the SXSW Gaming Awards; the event would not be held in 2023.)

Major performers for SXSW Music included Ashanti, Dolly Parton (her first time at SXSW; the appearance was to promote Run, Rose, Run, her new album (and companion novel written in collaboration with James Patterson)), Shawn Mendes, Beck (who was also a keynote speaker) and Oleksandra "Sasha" Zaritska, the frontperson of Ukrainian band KAZKA, who planned to make their U.S. debut at SXSW, but the other two members were drafted into military service due to the Russian invasion of Ukraine. Zaritska performed as part of a special "Austin Stands With Ukraine" musical showcase.

Winners of the 2022 SXSW Pitch event, in which emerging startups pitch to potential investors, included Syrup Tech, Anthill, and Sonavi Labs. The "Best In Show" winner was Hilos, the "Best Bootstrap" award went to Kiro Action, and the "Best One-Minute Speed Pitch" went to Unpacking.

The Winner of the 2022 SXSW EDU Launch event, in which companies pitch to a panel of investors and education leaders, was OurWorlds, Inc., a Native American edtech company founded on the Pala Indian Reservation.

Major organizations and brands which exhibited at SXSW (many with standalone "brand activation" pavilions) included Porsche, the University of Arizona, Amazon Prime Video (including a promotion for Lizzo's reality competition series, Watch Out for the Big Grrrls), Peacock, Paramount+, and several galleries devoted to NFTs, including the Doodles project, co-created by artist Evan Keast.

Promoting its new Halo series (based on the video game franchise), Paramount+ deployed a swarm of 400 purple-lighted drones in the nighttime skies above Austin, spelling out a scannable QR code as well as "#HaloTheSeries Streams Mar 24" and the Paramount+ logo.

Keynote speakers included Grammy Award-winning artists Lizzo and Beck; author Neal Stephenson, and producer/director Celine Tricart.

==== 2023 ====
SXSW 2023 occurred March 10–19 in Austin. The SXSW Conference & Festivals and SXSW EDU drew total participation totaling approximately 345,066.

Films that premiered at the festival included Angel Applicant (which won the Documentary Feature Competition), Bottoms, Dungeons & Dragons: Honor Among Thieves, Evil Dead Rise, I Used To Be Funny, The Wrath of Becky, Late Night with the Devil, Problemista, Tetris, Talk to Me, Aberrance, Brooklyn 45, It Lives Inside, Monolith, Raging Grace (which won the Narrative Feature Competition), Deadland and Bloody Hell. TV series that premiered included Grown (which took the TV Pilot Competition award) and Mrs. Davis.

In what was reported as a "surprise" announcement, John Wick 4 made its US premiere at SXSW on March 13; star Keanu Reeves participated in a live Q&A session immediately after the screening. Hypnotic, an action thriller starring Ben Affleck and directed by Robert Rodriguez, was given a "work in progress" preview screening on March 12. In another surprise screening to close out the film portion of SXSW, Affleck premiered Air, the biographical drama he directed about the creation of the Nike Air Jordan shoes (starring himself, Viola Davis and Matt Damon), on March 18.

Winners of the 2023 SXSW Pitch event (held March 11–12 at the Hilton Austin Downtown), in which emerging startups pitch to potential investors, included Reality Defender, Reach Pathways and Urban Machine. The "Best in Show" winner was PentoPix, the "Best Bootstrap" award went to AMA — Environmental Agents and the "Best Speed Pitch" went to LeadrPro. 13 out of the 40 startups participating in SXSW Pitch were from outside the USA.

Veteran broadcast journalist Dan Rather was the tenth inductee into the SXSW Hall of Fame; he addressed the attendees at the induction event on March 13. Rather joined previous inductees including Kara Swisher, Baratunde Thurston and Jeffrey Zeldman.

Austin-based tech entrepreneur Whurley delivered a 45-minute presentation completely generated with the help of generative AI tools ChatGPT and Midjourney.

Major performers for SXSW Music included New Order (the members of whom also participated in a keynote on March 15), Jeff Tweedy (of Wilco), Austin-based band Porcelain, New York City-based rock/soul quintet SUSU, rap artist Armani White and Michigander.

The Union of Musicians and Allied Workers (UMAW) held a rally at the Austin Convention Center on March 16, demanding increased compensation for the majority of the over 1,400 musical acts (the majority of them independent and relatively unknown musicians and bands, as opposed to more famous/established artists) contracted to appear at SXSW. Artists and bands are generally expected to cover many of their own expenses (including travel to Austin) while performing at the festival; other music festivals around the country offer more generous compensation, including lodging assistance. UMAW's demands include raising compensation, waiving application fees; SXSW representatives said they would review the compensation guidelines/policies after the festival.

Keynote speakers included José Andrés, Priyanka Chopra Jonas, Tilda Swinton, RZA, and the members of the band New Order.

A new spinoff event, SXSW Sydney, was held for the first time from October 15 to 22, 2023 in Sydney, Australia.

==== 2024 ====
SXSW 2024 took place from March 8–16. Films that premiered during the festival included the headlining Babes and The Fall Guy, Arcadian, Civil War, The Idea of You, Immaculate, Monkey Man, Road House, and Y2K. Post Malone, Jake Gyllenhaal, and Conor McGregor made appearances for the premiere of Road House. Featured television premieres included 3 Body Problem (Netflix), Black Twitter: A People's History (Hulu), Jerrod Carmichael Reality Show (HBO), and Ren Faire (HBO). XR Films that premiered at the XR Film Festival included Chief by Native American XR company OurWorlds which debuted on the Apple Vision Pro, the first time a film for the device appeared in competition.

Around 80 acts pulled out of the festival, including all ten Irish acts, citing the sponsorship of the event by the US Army and several military-industrial companies including RTX Corporation (formerly Raytheon), the world's largest producer of guided missiles. Some acts cited the US military's support for Israel in the Gaza war as part of their criticism of the sponsorship. One of the groups leading these protests—Austin for Palestine—was faced with trademark and copyright complaints from SXSW for using a parody of its logo (depicting blood-stained fighter jets flying off the arrow) in communications advocating against the festival. The Electronic Frontier Foundation filed a response on behalf of Austin for Palestine, arguing the image was clearly a parody allowable under United States trademark law, and doubting that a copyright claim could be made because the logo in question is too simplistic to be eligible for copyright.

==== 2025 ====
Following the boycotts in the previous year, the festival terminated its contracts with the US Army and RTX Corporation. SXSW 2025 took place from March 7 to 15.

SXSW Film had several premieres, with juried awards announced on March 12. Notable award winners in the competitions included: Shuffle (Documentary Feature Grand Jury Prize), One Day This Kid (Narrative Feature Grand Jury Prize), Retirement Plan (Narrative Short Grand Jury Prize), Stomach Bug (Animated Short Grand Jury Prize), and Harvester (Midnight Shorts Grand Jury Prize and Texas Shorts Grand Jury Prize). The music video for Swedish singer-songwriter Sarah Klang's 'Other Girls' won the Music Video Competition, and Fckups Anonymous* won the TV Pilot Competition.

Major celebrities attended film premieres and featured sessions, including Ben Affleck (for The Accountant 2), Anna Kendrick (for Another Simple Favor), Jenna Ortega and Paul Rudd (for Death of a Unicorn), Robert Downey Jr. (featured session), Pedro Pascal and Bella Ramsey (featured session for The Last of Us), and Sadie Sink (for O'Dessa). In addition to Another Simple Favor, the opening night of the festival featured the premiere of the Apple TV+ series The Studio.

The SXSW Innovation Awards were held on March 10. Winners included Wandercraft's Self-Balancing Exoskeleton (Artificial Intelligence), "I SEE MUSIC!" by Synegram (Audio Experience) and Share@MealConnect (Community Empowerment). The People's Choice Award went to "Engineering the world's first Smart Lipstick" (a R&D project of Grupo Boticário and CESAR Innovation Hub of Brazil), and SolarSPELL won Best in Show.

Investor and entrepreneur Mark Cuban was inducted into the SXSW Hall of Fame during the Innovation Awards Ceremony. In his speech, he was highly critical of US President Donald Trump and his special advisor, entrepreneur Elon Musk.

At the 2025 SXSW Pitch event, presented by KPMG, Polygraf AI was named "Best in Show," while Azul Biotechnologies, Inc. won "Best Bootstrap Company," Tempest Droneworx received the "Best Speed Pitch" award, and Launch Ahead was recognized for "Best In Inclusivity."

Keynote speakers included John Fogerty, Jay Graber (CEO of Bluesky), Arvind Krishna (chairman and CEO of IBM), Bryan Johnson, Issa Rae, Meredith Whittaker (President of Signal), and Cristiano Amon (President and CEO of Qualcomm Incorporated). The crew of the upcoming Artemis II crewed lunar mission were also featured as speakers.

Major performers at the SXSW Music Festival included Benson Boone, Common, Koe Wetzel, Big Freedia, Megan Moroney, Immersion (Malka Spigel and Colin Newman), and French electronic music duo Kap Bambino. There were more international acts than ever before, with 35% of the music lineup coming from outside the United States. This year's edition reportedly saw 1,012 bands showcasing; a major drop from the 2010s, when the average band count peaked at around 2,000. After the conclusion of SXSW 2025, organizers announced the 2026 edition of the music portion would be two days shorter in response to the decline.

Several major brands had a significant presence with activations, including Paramount+, Whataburger (Whataburger Museum of Art), Rivian (Rivian House and partnership with Ben & Jerry's), JBL (official audio partner with immersive experiences), Lululemon (Like New resale shop), Uber (driverless car service with Waymo), NASA (immersive space at the Central Public Library), and Adobe (discussions on AI and support for filmmakers).

SXSW 2025 highlighted a significant shift in the perception of AI, moving beyond hype towards practical applications across various industries. The uncertain future of TikTok, amidst potential sales or bans, sparked discussions about user-centric internet models and data practices. Streaming platforms maintained a strong presence with immersive activations (among them Prime Video and Paramount+), while emerging technologies like quantum computing were also spotlighted.

==== 2026 ====
SXSW 2026 took place from March 12–18, marking the festival's 40th annual edition. For the first time in the festival's history, all three major components — the Innovation Conference (formerly Interactive), Film & TV Festival, and Music Festival — ran concurrently over a condensed seven-day schedule, a departure from the traditional staggered ten-day format. The structural change was driven in part by the ongoing renovation of the Austin Convention Center, which is undergoing a three-year, $1.6 billion expansion, displacing the festival's primary indoor venue. In response, organizers established three "Clubhouses" to serve as track-specific hub locations: Brazos Hall (an event venue on 4th Street) for Innovation, venues near the Paramount and State Theatres for Film & TV, and various Rainey Street and 6th Street venues for Music. Additionally, most of downtown Austin's major hotels, including the JW Marriott and the Hilton Austin, hosted several events. The Music Festival was also extended to seven consecutive nights of showcases, adding one additional night compared to previous years.

The festival coincided with the 98th Academy Awards ceremony on March 15, creating scheduling conflicts for several prominent attendees and causing some film distribution buyers to screen premieres in Los Angeles instead. SXSW 2026 was presented by Rivian.

The Film & TV Festival opened with the world premiere of I Love Boosters, and also featured the premieres of Ready or Not 2: Here I Come, Over Your Dead Body and Pretty Lethal.

Featured television premieres included Margo's Got Money Troubles, Monsters of God, and the long-awaited Season 3 of The Comeback.

Keynote and featured session speakers across the Innovation, Film & TV, and Music conferences included Steven Spielberg, who participated in a live taping of the podcast The Big Picture and also appeared on a panel discussing his upcoming film Disclosure Day; Jane Fonda and comedian W. Kamau Bell, who headlined the session "Say It Louder: Artists, Activism & the First Amendment," alongside Jessica Weitz of the ACLU; California Governor Gavin Newsom; Serena Williams; and José Andrés. Other featured speakers included Demi Moore, Michelle Pfeiffer, Andy Cohen (in conversation with NBCUniversal Media Group Chairman Matt Strauss), Keke Palmer, Bob Odenkirk, Riz Ahmed (previewing his Prime Video series Bait), and Phil Schiller (a 35-year Apple veteran, appearing in a session on Apple's first 50 years). Radiohead guitarist Ed O'Brien appeared at the Music Conference. The Vox Media Podcast Stage ran March 13–15 at the Hilton Austin and featured sessions with Jonathan Glazer, Lisa Kudrow, Michael Patrick King, Mark Cuban, Spike Jonze, Kara Swisher, and Scott Galloway, among others.

The SXSW Music Festival featured more than 1,000 artists across seven nights of showcases. Notable performing artists included Alanis Morissette, Jack Johnson (performing with Hermanos Gutiérrez in conjunction with the documentary premiere SURFILMUSIC), Ingrid Andress, St. Vincent (DJ set), Ty Dolla $ign, Vic Mensa, ZHU, Benny the Butcher, Ella Langley, Geordie Greep (formerly of Black Midi), and Hiroko Yamamura. The All-American Rejects' Tyson Ritter also appeared in connection with the festival's keynote programming. Local radio station KUTX in association with arts nonprofit EQ Austin presented a showcase, free and open to the public, at a venue on Sixth Street that featured primarily local and regional artists.

The Innovation Conference tracks included Brand & Marketing, Cities & Climate, Creator Economy, Culture, Startups, Sports & Gaming, Tech & AI, and Workplace.

The SXSW Comedy Festival featured Bill Burr recording a live episode of The Monday Morning Podcast, the Upright Citizens Brigade, and comedy duo Devon Walker and Alex English performing their show DAD.

The 18th annual SXSW Pitch event saw 45 startups compete across nine categories over a two-day competition, with winners announced at an award ceremony on March 14. Category winners were Yuzi Care (Enterprise and Future of Work); OneCourt (Entertainment, Media, Sports & Creator Content); Surgicure Technologies, Inc. (Healthcare, Assistive Tech & BioTech); Mayimflow (Innovative World Tech); AlterEcho (Intelligent Systems, Robotics & Multisensory Technology); GigU (Smart Cities, Transportation, Manufacturing & Logistics); Smart Bricks (Smart Data, Security, and FinTech); Pittsburgh Coastal Energy (Student Startups); and Sotira (Sustainability, AgTech & Food); Sotira also took the Best in Show award. The Best Bootstrap Company award went to PLNTmatter of Los Angeles, the Best Speed Pitch award to Ecosphere Organics of Detroit, and the Best Inclusivity award to Rea Diagnostics SA of Lausanne, Switzerland. Organizers noted the 2026 applicant pool was the strongest since 2009; to date, more than 80 percent of the 732 companies that have participated in SXSW Pitch across its history have secured funding, collectively raising over $22 billion in venture capital.

Brand activations at SXSW 2026 focused on immersive, AI-driven experiences and story-driven pop-ups, including IBM’s Ferrari-themed AI Sports Club, Rivian’s R2 Electric Roadhouse, and Hulu’s immersive bus tour to promote The Testaments. Due to rising costs, brands favored highly targeted, fan-centered interactive spaces, such as themed lounges, "living storyworlds," and personalized memorabilia and content, focused primarily along Congress Avenue and Rainey Street, rather than the expensive pavillions of past years.

SXSW Sydney, the Australian spinoff event that had run annually since its 2023 debut, did not return in 2026.

On August 28, 2026, Penske Media Corporation announced that it had acquired full ownership of SXSW. Financial terms were not disclosed. SXSW stated that its headquarters and flagship events would remain in Austin.

== Economic impact ==
SXSW is the highest revenue-producing event outside of athletic and other events associated with The University of Texas at Austin for the Austin economy, with an estimated economic impact of $190.3 million in 2012 increasing to $218 million in 2013, $315 million in 2014, $317 million in 2015, and $325 million in 2016. In 2022, when SXSW resumed in-person events after the COVID-19 pandemic, the festival brought an estimated $280 million to the local economy, a 21% reduction from the 2019 economic impact of nearly $356 million (a record number). (In comparison, Super Bowl LI brought a $347 million economic impact to the Houston economy and the 2017 Final Four brought a $324 million economic impact to the economy of Phoenix, Arizona.)

Additionally, demand for hotel rooms in the Austin area continued to outstrip supply, pushing average nightly room rates up to an all-time high of $350 in 2016, a 60 percent increase over the average room rate seen during 2011's edition of SXSW. The average SXSW registrant also stayed in Austin longer in 2016, spending an average of 5.2 nights, up from 4.9 nights in 2015.

== Criticism ==
The growth of the festival has brought concerns about violence, crowd control, and safety. In 2013, NPR writer Andrea Swensson wrote that she had decided to stop attending the festival, writing, "I can't help but feel that it has strayed far away from its original premise as a grassroots gathering place for new, undiscovered talent and increasingly feels like a big ol' Times Square billboard-sized commercial."

=== 2014 fatalities ===
In 2014, an incident in which a drunk driver ploughed into a crowd of festival attendees, killing four, prompted discussion about whether the festival had grown too large and raucous.

The incident gave rise to multiple lawsuits against festival organizers, SXSW Holdings LLC and SXSW Holdings Inc., brought by those injured in the event and families of the deceased. Other defendants, including the City of Austin and a music venue, were later added to the suits. By late 2018, the bulk of the claims had been dismissed by both district and federal courts.

Partially motivated by the incident, Austin's Urban Transportation Commission announced in May 2014 it was seeking to enhance safety at the festival, with an initial focus on implementing transportation measures to resolve issues linked to the festival. The Austin Music Commission also met to discuss music venues and sound problems linked to the festival. The city voted to limit the number of special events that would be approved to 114, a 32 percent decrease from the number of approved events during the 2014 festival.

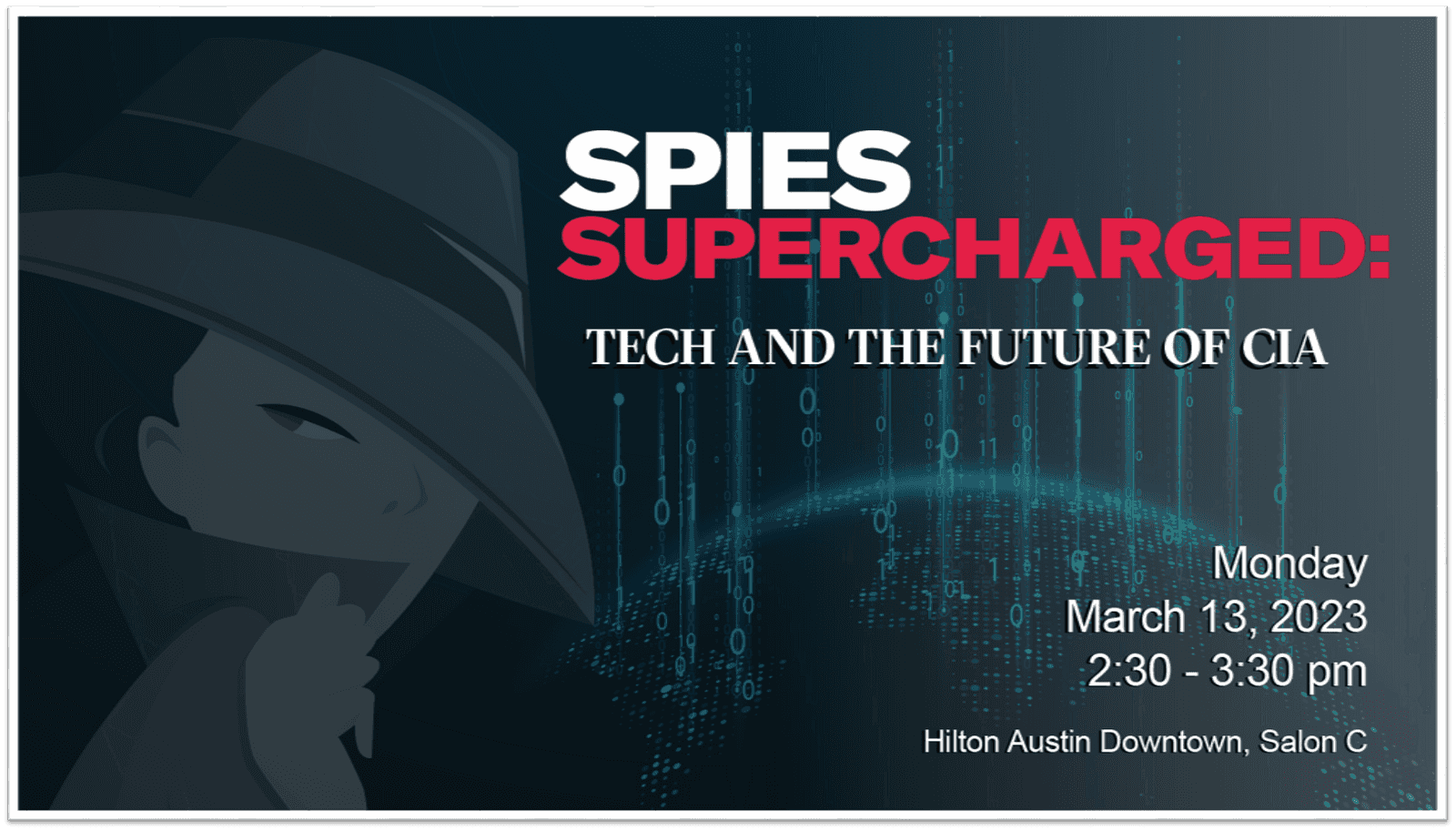
The Central Intelligence Agency's graphic for its "Spies Supercharged" panel at South by Southwest 2023

=== Response to GamerGate harassment ===
In October 2015, SXSW cancelled two video game panels ("#SavePoint: A Discussion on the Gaming Community" and "Level Up: Overcoming Harassment In Games") scheduled for the 2016 festival due to threats of violence made by GamerGaters. In response to the cancellations, BuzzFeed and Vox Media made statements saying they would pull out of the festival if the two panels weren't reinstated. Organizers apologized for the cancelations and replaced the panels with a daylong "online harassment summit" on March 12, 2016.

=== Boycott ===
Divisions of the United States Intelligence Community, including the Office of the Director of National Intelligence (ODNI), National Geospatial-Intelligence Agency (NGA), National Reconnaissance Office (NRO) and Central Intelligence Agency (CIA), have presented panels at the event and recruit talent. In 2023, plans for CIA panels were met with derision over the agency's association with Operation Condor.

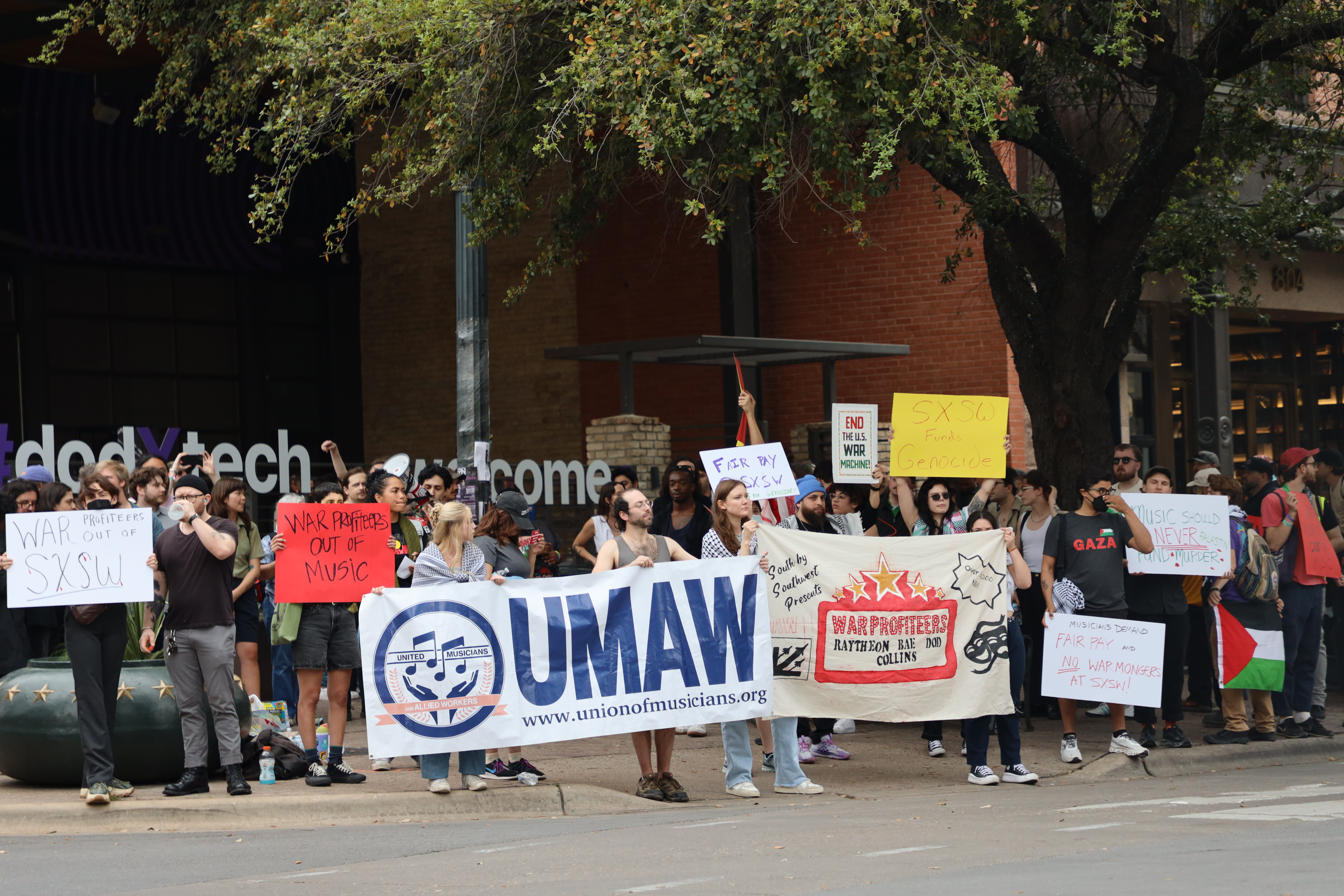
Pro-Palestinian protest on March 14, 2024

In 2024, more than 80 musical acts canceled appearances at the festival in a boycott protesting the US Army's status as a "super sponsor" of the event, citing the Army's support of Israel's ongoing invasion of the Gaza Strip.

In February 2024, when the local advocacy group Austin for Palestine Coalition used a modified version of the SXSW logo in their anti-SXSW protests, SXSW sent them a cease-and-desist letter, accusing the group of trademark and copyright infringement. This SXSW claim was refuted by the Electronic Frontier Foundation on behalf of the Austin for Palestine Coalition.

In June 2024, SXSW stated that the US Army and companies engaging in weapons manufacturing would not be sponsors of the 2025 event.

== In popular culture ==
- Comedian and actor Fred Armisen began his comic career with the short film Fred Armisen's Guide to Music and SXSW, released in 1998, in which he poses as various characters, asking silly questions of musicians and other attendees at that year's SXSW Music Conference.
- SXSW was featured during the 2005 season of MTV's The Real World. Cast members were tasked with shooting and editing their own documentary on the music festival.
- Comedy duo and band Flight of the Conchords performed at the 2006 SXSW Music Festival, during which time they also recorded a documentary titled Flight of the Conchords: A Texan Odyssey, which aired on New Zealand's TV3 in late 2006.
- The 2011 documentary Winning America is about a US tour of Canadian band Said the Whale that culminates in that year's SXSW Music Festival.
- SXSW was featured during the season 9 premiere of Anthony Bourdain: No Reservations. The episode aired in 2012.
- In the 2014 British-Irish film Frank, an experimental band (led by the title character) is booked to play a show at the SXSW Music Festival, but the gig leads to the band's breakup.
- In the 2019 anime Carole & Tuesday, the titular duo is booked to perform at the SXSW Music Festival on Mars.

== Spinoff festivals ==
In addition to the main South by Southwest festivals, the company also runs SXSW EDU, an annual conference on educational innovation held in Austin. SXSW EDU evaluates proposals and panel opportunities through an advisory board composed of K-12 and postsecondary professionals, as well as leading experts in the workforce development industry.

The creators of South by Southwest co-created two similar festivals in 1995: North by Northwest (NXNW) in Portland, Oregon (co-founded by the Willamette Week), and North by Northeast (NXNE) in Toronto (co-founded by Now). North by Northwest ended in 2001, and was replaced by MusicfestNW (MFNW), an event run entirely by the Willamette Week.

From 2006 to 2010, organizers ran West by Southwest (WXSW) in Tucson, Arizona, a music festival which occurred directly before South by Southwest and mostly featured bands that were also booked for SXSW.

SXSW Sydney took place in Sydney, Australia, between 2023 and 2025. It did not return in 2026 having been deemed not economically viable after the New South Wales government cancelled its funding.

In 2025, South by Southwest London had its inaugural festival.

Other former conferences run by the SXSW organization include:

- SXSW Eco, a conference focusing on social and environmental issues through the lens of technology, creativity and design held in Austin from 2011 to 2016
- SXSW V2V, a conference focused on innovative startups, held in Las Vegas from 2013 to 2015
- The me Convention, held in Frankfurt, Germany and in Stockholm, Sweden, in collaboration with Mercedes-Benz, from 2017 to 2019

== Similar festivals ==
Festivals inspired by SXSW include:

- Web Summit – Lisbon, Portugal
- Live at Heart – Örebro, Sweden
- So What?! Music Fest (originally "South by So What?!") – Dallas–Fort Worth Metroplex
- The Great Escape Festival – Brighton, England
- XOXO – Portland, Oregon
- North to Shore – New Jersey. Held in the three New Jersey cities of Asbury Park, Newark and Atlantic City.

Festivals inspired by SXSW that are defunct include:

- 35 Denton (originally "North by 35" or "NX35", then "35 Conferette") – Denton, Texas (2009–2016)
- C2SV (originally "SVSX") – San Jose, California (2012–2016)
- The Goa Project – Goa, India (2013–2018)
- Incubate (originally "ZXZW") – Tilburg, Netherlands (2005–2016)
- MidPoint Music Festival (MPMF) – Cincinnati, Ohio (2001–2017)
- MoSo – Saskatoon, Canada (2011–2016)
- MusicfestNW (MFNW) – Portland, Oregon (2001–2018)
- North by North Western (NXNW) – Wigan, England (2007–2009)
- Sounds by South Bend (originally "South by South Bend") – South Bend, Indiana (2013–2015)
- South by Due East – Houston, Texas (2003–2019)
- Tech Open Air (TOA) – Berlin (2012–2020)
- TechfestNW (TFNW), a sister conference to MusicFestNW – Portland, Oregon (2012–2021)
- Yes and Yes Yes (YXYY) (originally "Yes by Yes Yes") – Palm Springs, California (2013–2017)

Festivals inspired by South by Southwest have been collectively nicknamed "four-letter festivals". Metro Silicon Valley, which founded C2SV, wrote in 2013 that such festivals were important revenue sources for the alternative weekly newspapers that founded them.

On October 3, 2016, a one-day festival called "South by South Lawn" (SXSL) was held at the White House as a collaboration between SXSW, US President Barack Obama, and the American Film Institute.

== See also ==
- CNN Grill
