= Nigel Jaquiss =

American journalist

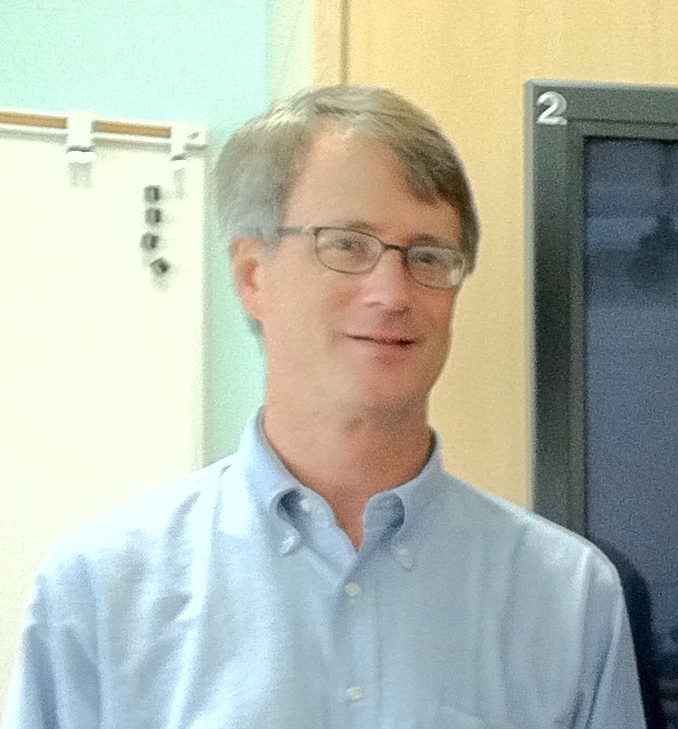
- Nigel Jaquiss in 2013
- Born: 1962 (age 63–64)
- Education: Dartmouth College, 1984 B.A. Columbia University Graduate School of Journalism, 1997 Master's degree
- Occupations: Journalist, winner of Pulitzer Prize 2005
- Spouse: Margaret Remsen (m. 1989)
- Children: 3

Nigel Jaquiss (born 1962) is an American journalist who won the 2005 Pulitzer Prize for investigative reporting, for his work exposing former Oregon Governor Neil Goldschmidt's sexual abuse of a 14-year-old girl while he was mayor of Portland, Oregon. His story was published in Willamette Week in May 2004. He left Willamette Week in 2025 and became a reporter for Oregon Journalism Project, a new non-profit newspaper.

== Education and career ==
Jaquiss graduated from Dartmouth College in 1984; he spent eleven years as a Wall Street and Singapore-based crude oil trader, working for Cargill, Morgan Stanley and Goldman Sachs. He sought a career change, eventually enrolling at Columbia University Graduate School of Journalism where he got his master's degree in 1997.

He began his journalism career in Portland in January 1998, working for Willamette Week. One of his first major stories was an exposé of toxic mold and unsafe levels of radon at Whitaker Middle School in Northeast Portland, which led to the school shutting down and the building being demolished.

=== Goldschmidt story ===
Jaquiss almost lost his prize-winning scoop about Neil Goldschmidt when he and his editor (Mark Zusman) decided to give Goldschmidt a full week to respond to the allegations Willamette Week was planning to make. Goldschmidt, who had previously told Zusman to "go get 'em" after a lunch in the middle of the paper's investigation, took his story to The Oregonian instead. Zusman told the newspaper industry magazine Editor & Publisher that he and Jaquiss decided to post the story online immediately, so as not to risk being beat by the daily. Jaquiss' Pulitzer represented only the third alternative weekly paper to have been awarded the prize.

=== Kitzhaber scandal ===
Jaquiss was credited with having "brought down" another Oregon governor, John Kitzhaber, in 2015. Following a series of damaging articles, many of them written by Jaquiss for the Willamette Week in late 2014 and early 2015, Kitzhaber and his fiancee Cylvia Hayes became the subject of a criminal investigation probing possible conflicts of interest and misuse of state resources. Kitzhaber resigned in February 2015.

=== Other work ===
In 2006, Jaquiss reported on allegations made by the Industrial Customers of the Northwest Utilities about improper tampering with the bond rating of the Portland General Electric (PGE) corporation during the UE180 rate case in which PGE was attempting to raise its rates by roughly 9%, equivalent to roughly $200 million in annual cash flow. According to the allegations that Jaquiss reported to the media, PGE finance officials attempted to improperly doctor the bond rating produced by Standard and Poor's and thereby increase the clout for the need to implement a rate hike.

In 2009, Jaquiss broke the initial news of Portland mayor Sam Adams' affair with an intern who may have been underage at the onset of their affair.

Jaquiss came to national attention in April 2014 during an interview with Republican candidates for Oregon's 2014 U.S. Senate election. One of the candidates, Mark Callahan, noticed that he was writing "blah blah blah" in his notes while another candidate was speaking, which Callahan called "disrespectful". Soon after, in response to Callahan replying to a question on climate change by stating that it is a myth, Jaquiss asked, "Where are you on the Easter Bunny?"

== Personal life ==
Jaquiss married Margaret Remsen in 1989; the couple have three children together as of his 2005 Pulitzer Prize win.
