= MusicfestNW =

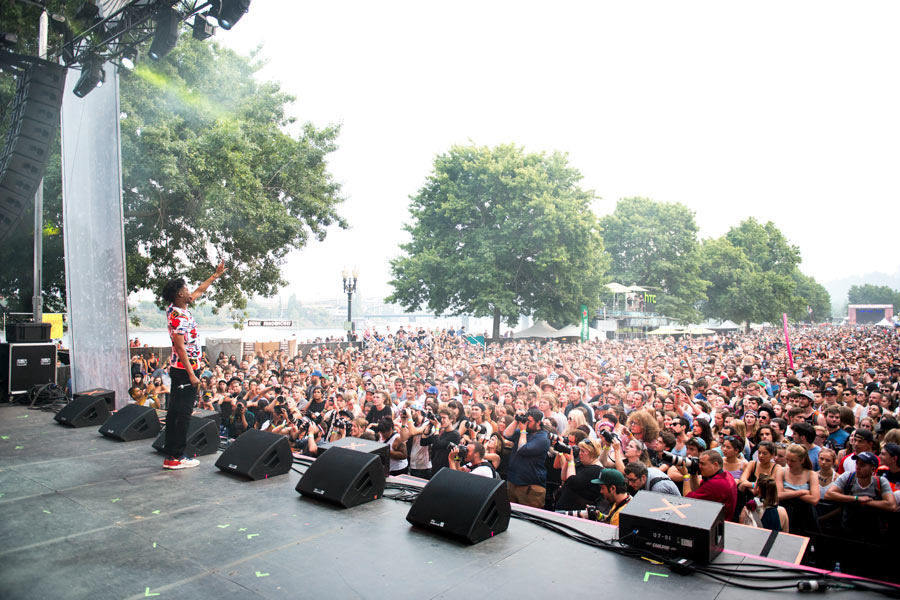
- Danny Brown at MusicfestNW 2015
- Abbreviation: MFNW
- Status: Defunct
- Genre: Music festival
- Frequency: Annually
- Venue: Crystal Ballroom, Roseland Theater, Doug Fir Lounge
- Location: Portland, Oregon
- Country: United States
- Inaugurated: 2001
- Founder: Mark Zusman, Richard Meeker
- Most recent: 2018
- Participants: 150+
- Attendance: 10,000 – 15,000
- Sponsor: Willamette Week

MusicfestNW (MFNW) was a multi-venue music festival that took place every fall in Portland, Oregon from 2001 to 2018. In 2014 the format of the festival changed to a two-day waterfront music festival. The festival was organized by the alternative weekly Willamette Week. Its sister festival, TechfestNW (TFNW), ran from 2012 to 2021.

== History ==
In 1995, the creators of the South by Southwest festival partnered with the Willamette Week to create the North by Northwest Music Festival. In 2001, Willamette Week ended their sponsorship of NXNW, and started MusicfestNW in its place.

At its height, MFNW was the third largest indoor music festival in the United States, with more than 150 bands across 18 of Portland's most popular music venues. The main festival stages included the Crystal Ballroom, Roseland Theater and Doug Fir.

In 2009, MFNW was rated by Time as one of 50 Authentic American Experiences of 2009.

== See also ==
- Culture of Portland, Oregon
- List of festivals in the United States
  - List of music festivals in the United States
