= SOS Children's Villages UK =

International children's charity

- Founded: 1963 in Lavender Hill, London, United Kingdom
- Type: Charity
- Registration no.: 1069204
- Purpose: Alternative care for children who cannot live with their birth parents
- Headquarters: Cambridge, England
- Region served: Worldwide
- CEO: Alison Wallace
- Employees: 27
- Website: https://soschildrensvillages.org.uk

SOS Children's Villages UK is the UK chapter of SOS Children's Villages – the largest international charity dedicated to aiding children who have lost parental care. The charity is non-denominational and works in the spirit of the United Nations Convention on the Rights of the Child.

Internationally, SOS Children's Villages works in 136 countries and territories, providing services in 125 of those nations. Its goal is to ensure that no child grows up alone. International programs and campaigns include children's villages, family strengthening programs, youth employability and vocational training, and child protective services.

Since 1995, SOS Children's Villages has worked with the United Nations to help governments and organizations support children who have lost or are at risk of losing parental care. In 2009, the charity worked with other experts to develop the UN Guidelines for the Alternative Care of Children.

In 1969, chairman of SOS Children's Villages UK, Dickson Mabon attempted to arrange the construction of Children's Villages in Scotland. However, he was refused permission to build the Villages on planning grounds by the local authorities concerned.

== Supporters and ambassadors ==
SOS Children's Villages partners with significant persons to advocate and boost their message. Previous supporters include Stephen Hawking, Alexander McCall Smith, Anyika Onuora, Richard Attenborough, Kate Humble and Wayne Rooney. Additionally, Belgian footballer Vincent Kompany has advocated for the international efforts of SOS Children's Villages, and Angelina Jolie is a long-term supporter and has visited SOS Children's Villages in Haiti, Ethiopia and Jordan. Nelson Mandela was a supporter of SOS Children's Villages work in South Africa and officially opened the SOS Children's Village in Cape Town. Upon his death in December 2013, SOS Children's Villages joined in memorials to celebrate his life. Finally, The Dalai Lama supports SOS Children, particularly the SOS Children's Villages in North India, which provide a home for child refugees from Tibet.

== Trustees ==
The current Board of Trustees of SOS Children's Villages includes Harpinder Collacott (Chair), Kim Annette Bowden, Janet Reilly, Suli Ulla Anja Hampson, Louise Mary McDonald, Jonathan Steinback, Adelise Baha and Solava Ibrahim. The President of SOS Children's Villages is Dame Mary Richardson. Previous Trustees have included George Windsor, Earl of St Andrews.

== Campaigns and programs ==
=== International programs ===
SOS Children's Villages hosts over 550 SOS village communities around the world for children who have nobody to care for them. The children's villages have dedicated SOS parents who give the children the individual care and attention they need and SOS siblings to grow up with.

SOS Children's Villages works directly with families to provide practical and emotional support to help parents and caregivers look after their children, preventing children from growing up alone. SOS Children's Villages also hosts youth employability and vocational training programs around the world, tailored to the country they are in to provide young people with the skills and confidence to build fulfilling careers and independent lives.

In conflict zones and disaster-hit areas, SOS Children's Villages provides children with specific protection and care utilizing their global infrastructure and resources.

=== Wikipedia for Schools (WFS) ===
SOS Children's Villages UK created Wikipedia for Schools (WFS) in 2006. WFS is a selection of approximately 10,000 Wikipedia articles designed for offline use in primary and secondary classrooms. WFS saw multiple updated versions with SOS Children's Villages UK until 2013. Then, in 2020, SolarSPELL, a nonprofit organization at Arizona State University, took on the role of maintaining Wikipedia for Schools.
