= TechfestNW =

Former annual technology conference in Portland, Oregon, US

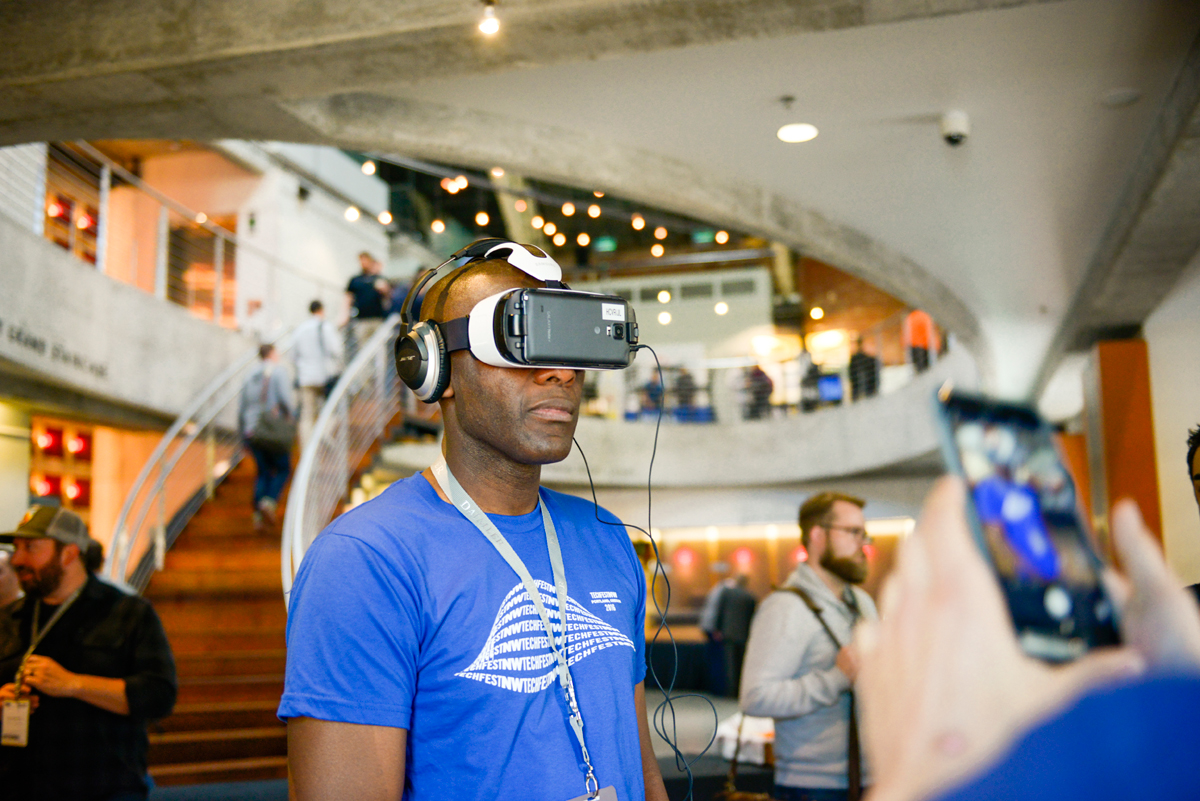
VR demo at TechFestNW 2016

TechfestNW (TFNW) was an annual technology conference in Portland, Oregon that ran from 2012 to 2021. It was founded by Willamette Week editor Mark Zusman, and was the sister festival to MusicfestNW, which ran from 2001 to 2018. The event included innovators, entrepreneurs, tech companies and investors from around the world. It featured main stage speakers, workshops, a startup pitch competition, exhibitor booths, networking opportunities and parties. In 2012, Fortune magazine called it the next South by Southwest (SXSW).

TechfestNW was held in several different venues, including the Portland Art Museum, OMSI, the Armory, and Left Bank Annex. In both 2020 and 2021, it was held online as a "virtual conference" due to the COVID-19 pandemic.

== TechfestNW 2018: April 5–6 ==
In 2018, TechfestNW moved venues to Portland State University's Viking Pavilion, which enabled the increase in size and scope of the conference. The themes, which drive speaker and workshop content, were Smart Cities/Smart Transit, Food Tech, Health Tech, and Inclusivity in Tech Culture.

Seventy-five companies from all over the world participated in PitchfestNW, the startup competition within TechfestNW. The top 5 finalists presented on the main stage to a special panel of judges, before the winner, Goodnuss, was ultimately chosen. International startups were judged separately and the 2018 winner was Moduu from Bavaria, Germany.

== See also ==
- Culture of Portland, Oregon
