= South by South Lawn =

Technology festival at the White House

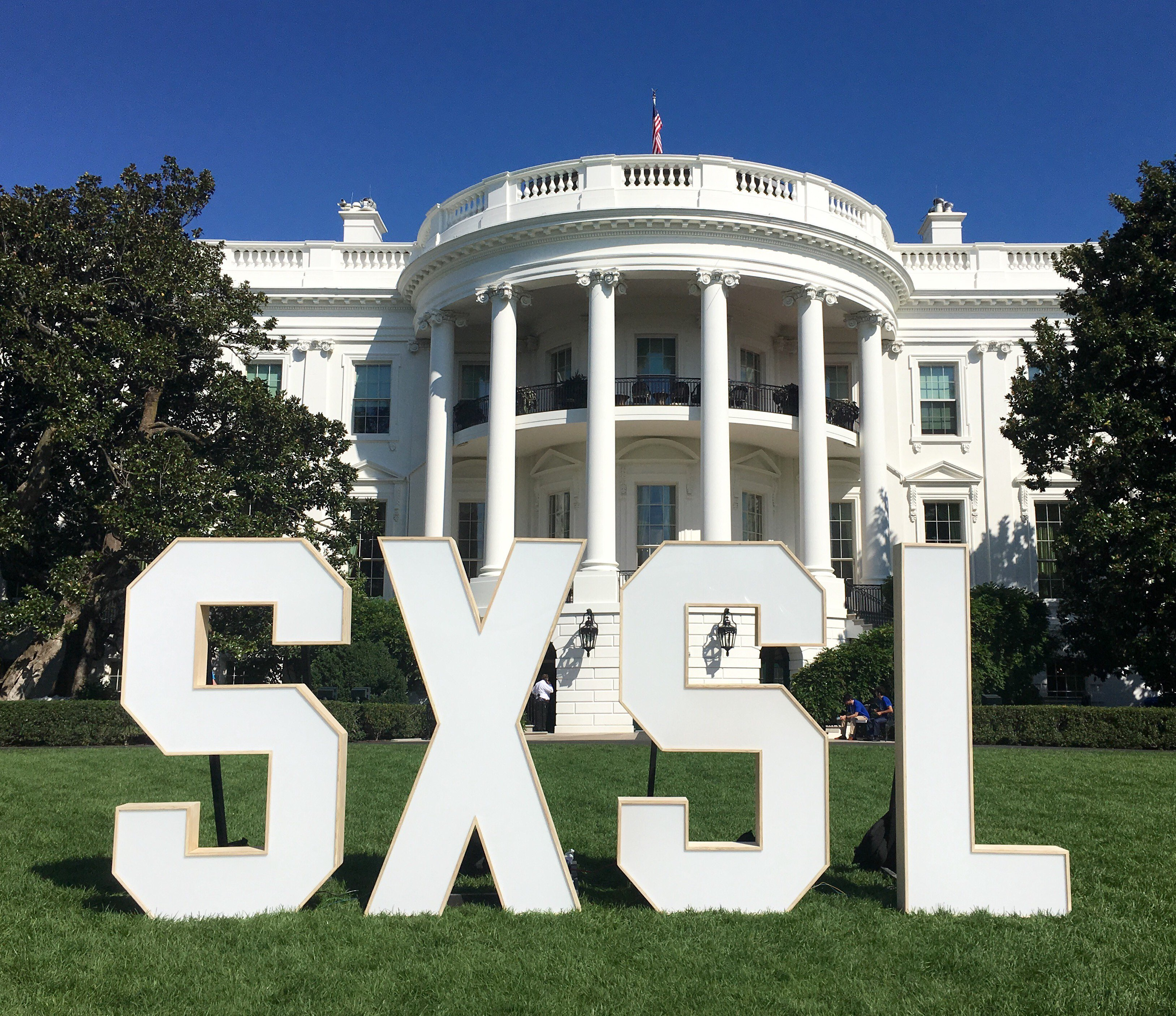
- White House with SXSL sign in foreground, part of the South by South Lawn festival
- Date: October 3, 2016
- Duration: 1 day
- Venue: White House
- Location: White House South Lawn
- Organised by: Obama administration, South by Southwest, President's Committee on Arts and Humanities, Futurism

South by South Lawn (stylized SXSL) was a technology and music festival organized by the White House under the Obama administration that took place in October 2016 in Washington, D.C. It was modelled after the South by Southwest music festival.

== Background ==
South by South Lawn was a technology and music festival initiated by the Obama administration. It was modelled after and co-organised by the South by Southwest festival, President's Committee on Arts and Humanities, and tech media company Futurism. It was hosted on the South Lawn of the White House, and was live streamed. Announced in September 2016 by the White House, the festival took place on October 3.

The first festival to be staged at the White House, it was considered by the Times columnist Carol Midgley to be "the coolest event of the year" and "better than a ticket to the Oscars". The New York Times considered the event "like the swan song of the first president who seemed to get it — “it” being the value of start-up culture" while Pitchfork, sharing similar views, wrote that it felt "idyllically removed from the present political tire fire". The festival was noted by the LA Times in a December 2016 retrospective as reflecting "many of the cultural shifts that happened during the Obama presidency."

The festival had panel discussions and exhibits relating to sustainability, climate change, and technology. One exhibit comprised a virtual reality experience by the Guardian and The Mill that showcased the sensation of spending nine minutes in solitary confinement, while another was mounted by the American toy company Sphero and allowed visitors to play with robots. The SXSL sign was programmed by Adam Savage to light up every time someone made a social media post with the hashtag #sxsl.

=== Climate change panel ===
The main event of the festival was a climate change panel led by President Obama that featured guest speakers actor Leonardo DiCaprio and the Canadian climate scientist Katharine Hayhoe. This also included the domestic premiere of DiCaprio's National Geographic climate documentary Before the Flood. The panel was considered "stirring" and "passionate" by The Independent chief film critic Clarisse Loughrey.

== Musical guests ==
In late September 2016, President Barack Obama announced the musical line-up for South by South Lawn.

- The Lumineers
- Gallant
- the Dap-Kings (Note: Sharon Jones was announced for the event, but was unable to attend due to illness and was replaced by Gallant.)
- DJ Beverly Bond

== Attendance ==
Attendees were chosen through a nomination process where attendees must have made positive impacts in their communities. More than 20,000 attendees were nominated to attend. "A few thousand people" attended according to The New York Times out of 24,000 applicants.
