= Mark Zusman =

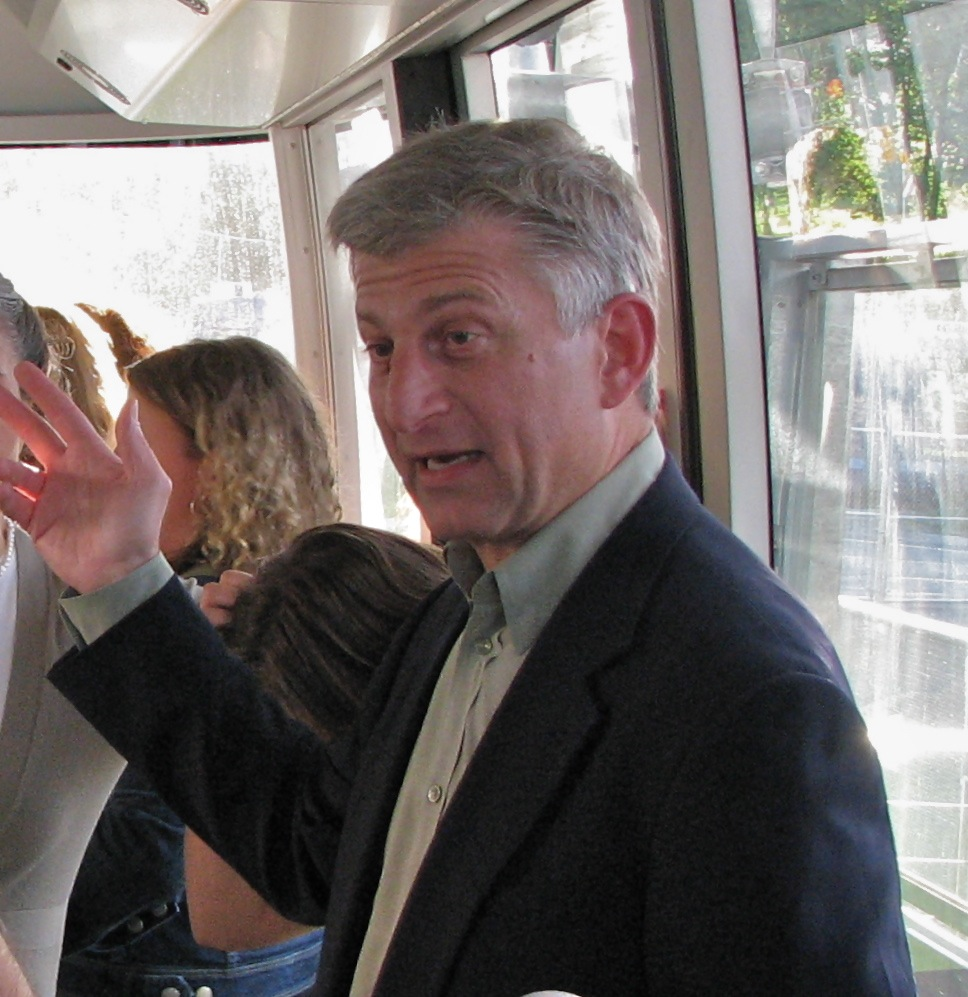
Mark Zusman in 2007

Mark Zusman (born 1954) is the founder and director of the Oregon Journalism Project a non-profit investigative newsroom for the state of Oregon. He was formerly the editor and publisher of Willamette Week, a media company based in Portland, Oregon. He was the paper's editor since 1983, and became its publisher in 2015, when Richard Meeker stepped down from that position.

Willamette Week is part of the City of Roses Newspaper Company, which once owned the Santa Fe Reporter in Santa Fe, New Mexico, and Indy Week in The Triangle area of North Carolina.

== Career ==
Zusman and business partner Richard Meeker created City of Roses in 1982. In 2005, Willamette Week became the first and only weekly newspaper to win the Pulitzer Prize for Investigative Reporting and the first to win a Pulitzer for a story that was first published on the web. In 1986, Zusman was awarded the Gerald Loeb Award for Business Journalism for stories he wrote about Nike, and in 1987 he won the Bruce Baer Award for journalism in Oregon for his coverage of Portland homeless advocate Michael Stoops. In 2013, Zusman was inducted into the University of Oregon School of Journalism and Communication Hall of Achievement. During a 2016 roundtable discussion of local and national politics on an edition of Oregon Public Broadcasting's "Think Out Loud", he strongly criticized The Oregonian for not endorsing a candidate in the presidential race.

Zusman has been the president of the board of the Independent Media Institute based in San Francisco. He was elected to the board of the Washington D.C.–based Association of Alternative Newsweeklies (now the Association of Alternative Newsmedia) in 2005 and later served as its president. He serves as a judge for the Payne Award for Ethics in Journalism.

A 1970s graduate of the University of Oregon's School of Journalism and Communication (SJOC), where he earned a Master's in Journalism, Zusman has served as a guest lecturer at SJOC. He has lectured at the Academy of Alternative Journalism at the Medill School of Journalism at Northwestern University and the Walter Cronkite School of Journalism and Mass Communication at Arizona State University. He is also a former fellow of the East–West Center.

=== MusicfestNW and TechfestNW ===
Zusman and Meeker were the founders of MusicfestNW, a two-decades-old music festival that took place in clubs throughout Portland and on the waterfront each summer.

He was the founder of TechfestNW, an annual technology conference in Portland, Oregon which launched in 2011. As a frequent moderator, he brings a journalistic lens to main stage interviews with leaders in the tech space. Recent interviews have included technology journalist Kara Swisher, co-founder of Recode; and David Plouffe, Obama campaign manager and former Uber exec.
