= Umair Haque =

American business writer

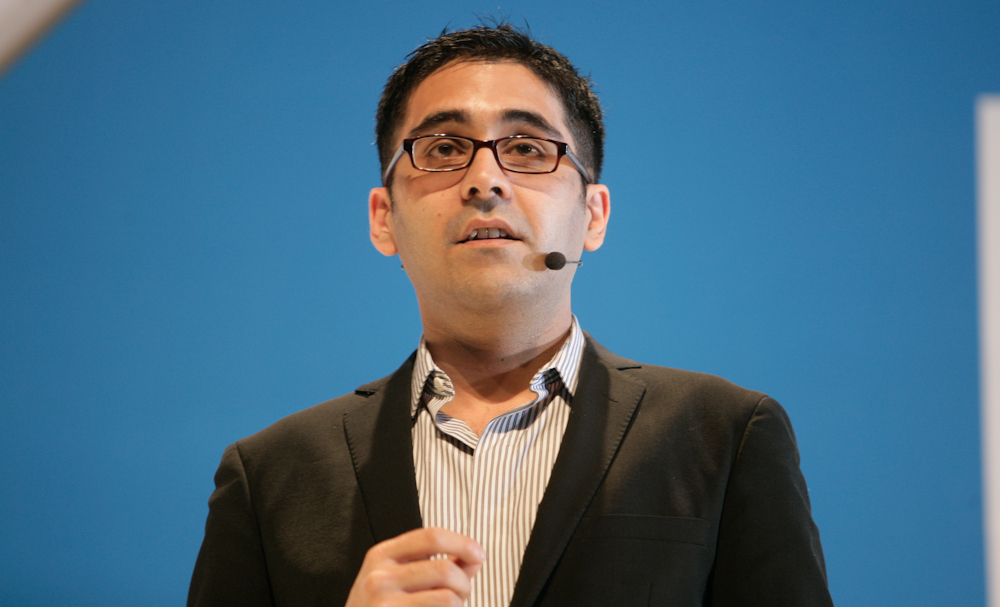
- Haque at the NEXT Conference in 2009
- Education: McGill University (BS); London Business School (MBA)
- Occupations: Consultant, Author

Umair Haque is a British economist, consultant and author. He was the director of the Havas Media Lab, has previously blogged in the Harvard Business Review and is author of the book The New Capitalist Manifesto: Building a Disruptively Better Business. The book sets the "incumbent" capitalists of the 20th century against the 21st "insurgents" and states that the latter are creating a more sustainable "new capitalism".

He has written on economic and civilizational issues on the Medium writing platform but is now less active on Medium and prefers The Issue .

== Personal life ==
Haque is the son of Pakistani economist Nadeem Haque. He graduated from McGill University with a degree in neuroscience and got an MBA from the London Business School.

== Bibliography ==
- Haque, Umair (2011). The New Capitalist Manifesto: Building a Disruptively Better Business. Harvard Business Publishing. ISBN 978-1-4221-5858-6.
- Haque, Umair (2011). Betterness: Economics for Humans. Harvard Business Publishing.
