= SolarSPELL =

Education non-profit organization

SolarSPELL is an educational initiative with nonprofit status based at Arizona State University. SolarSPELL, which stands for Solar Powered Educational Learning Library, is a portable, solar-powered digital library system. It stores curated educational resources and acts as an offline Wi-Fi hotspot, allowing users to access its content without the need for internet connectivity.

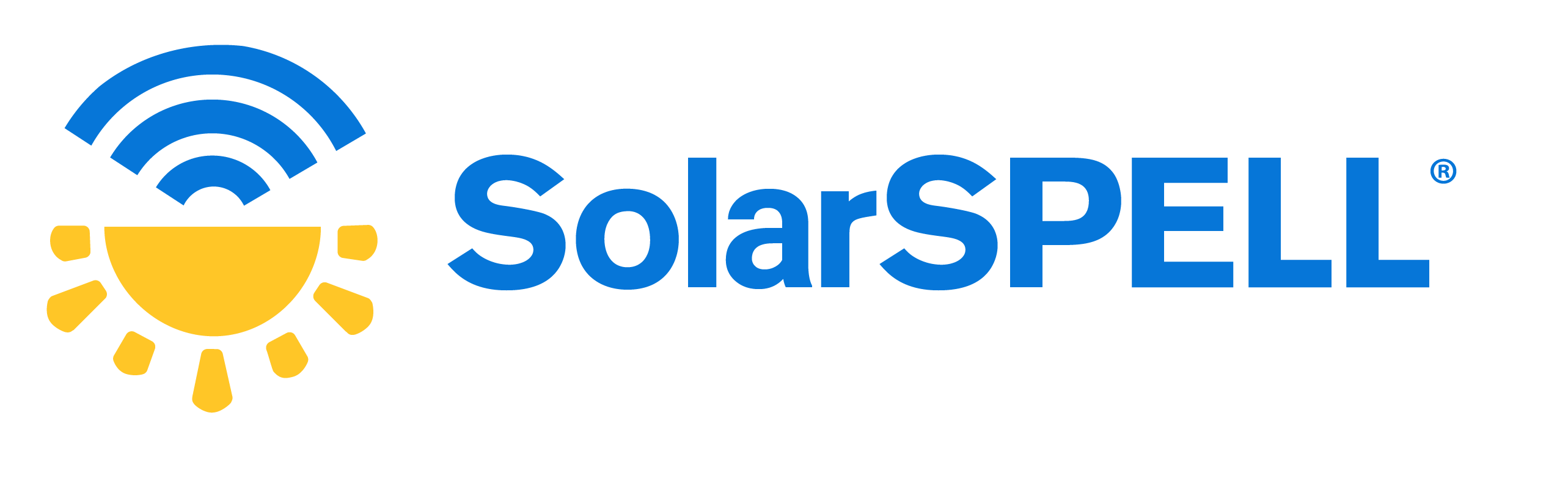
SolarSPELL logo

As of 2024, SolarSPELL has distributed nearly 600 libraries in 15 countries globally and trained almost a thousand individuals on how to use the digital library technology.

== History ==
SolarSPELL was co-founded by Laura Hosman, a professor at Arizona State University (ASU), and Bruce Baikie in 2015. Hosman's students were involved in the creation and testing of multiple iterations of the SolarSPELL device.

== Awards and Recognitions ==
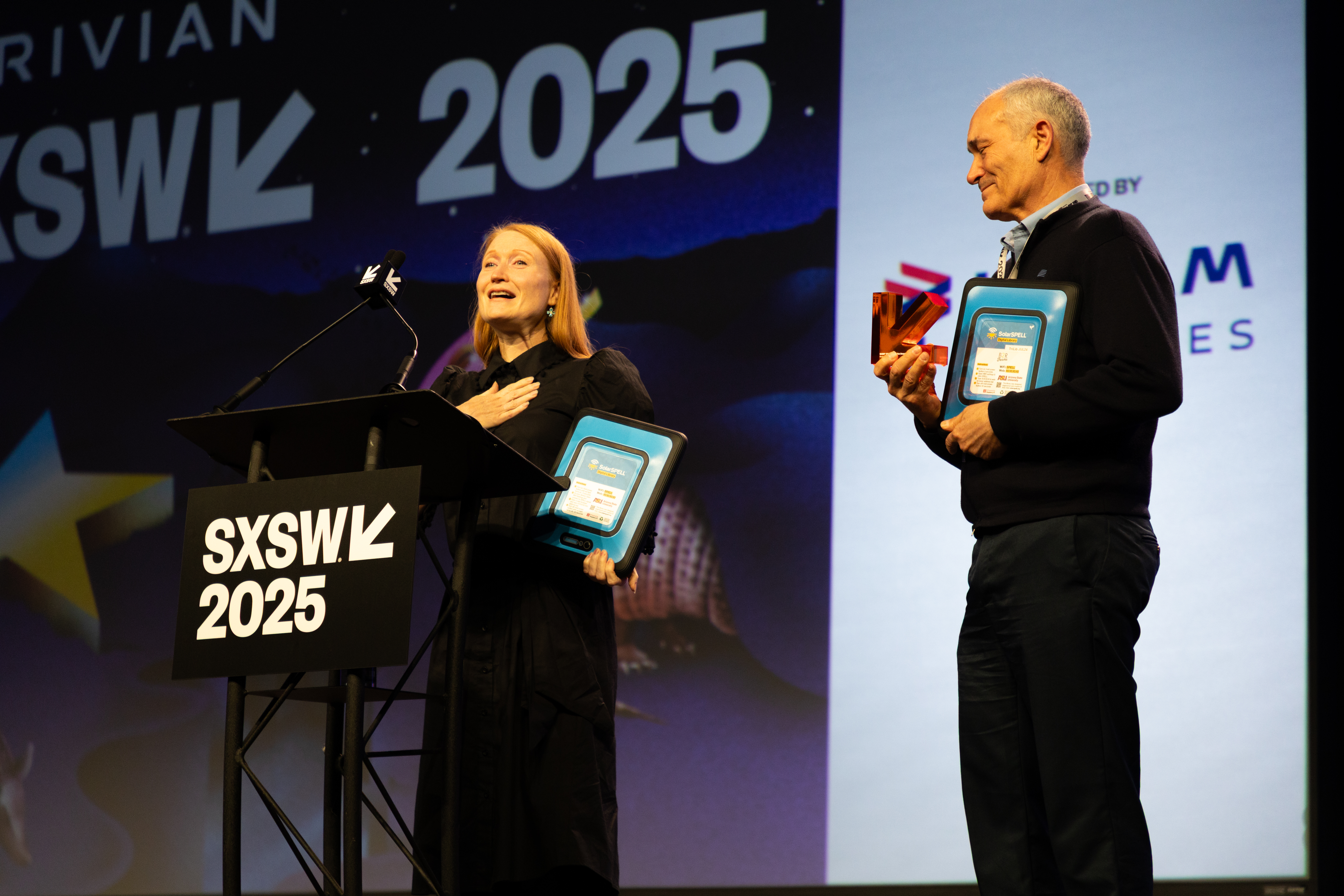
Dr. Laura Hosman and Bruce Baikie, co-founders of SolarSPELL, receive the award for "Best in Show" at the 2025 South by Southwest Innovation Awards.

In March 2025, the ASU SolarSPELL Initiative was named "Best in Show" at the 2025 South by Southwest Innovation Awards. SolarSPELL was also named one of TIME's Best Inventions of 2025. Additionally, SolarSPELL won the 2025 QS Reimagine Education Award, worth $25,000 (USD). This award had over 1,650 submissions across twenty-one categories, and two winners were selected. At Arizona State University, SolarSPELL won the 2025 President's Award for Principled Innovation. At the 2026 Edison Awards, SolarSPELL won the Silver Award in Culture Impact and Education, selected out of 700 applicants.

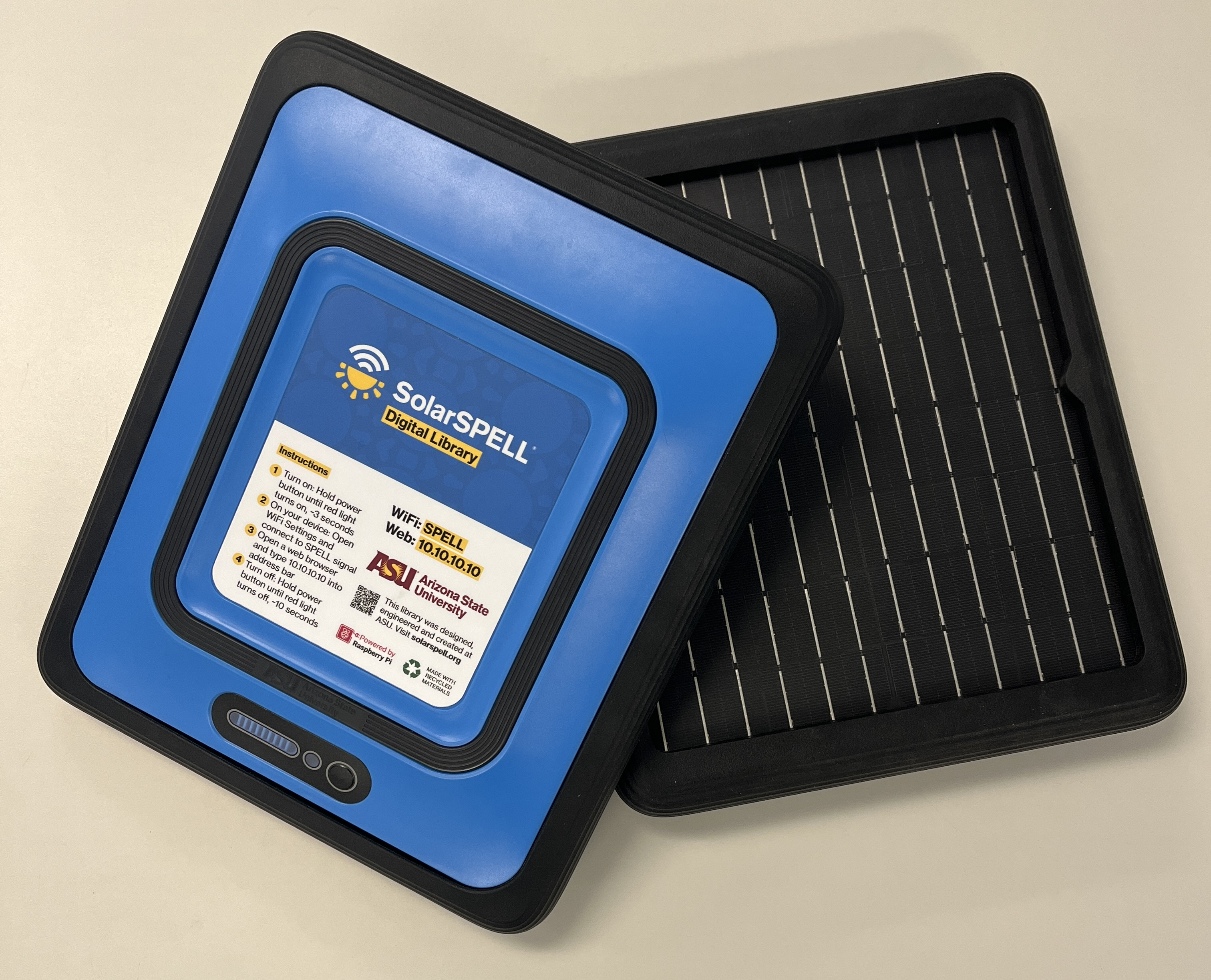
The solar-powered digital library device called SolarSPELL.

== Hardware ==
The SolarSPELL digital library device consists of a waterproof case, a solar panel, a lithium-ion battery, a voltage regulator, USB cords, a Raspberry Pi, and an SD card. The SD card stores pre-selected educational content for the users to access.

== Projects ==
The SolarSPELL library is used in 15 countries in Africa, the Middle East, the Pacific Islands, and North America. As of 2024, SolarSPELL has deployed 597 digital libraries and trained over 960 individuals how to use the technology. They are estimated to have reached over 300,000 people with the contents of their digital libraries. They have also been developing different versions of the library content in various languages including Arabic and Kurdish.

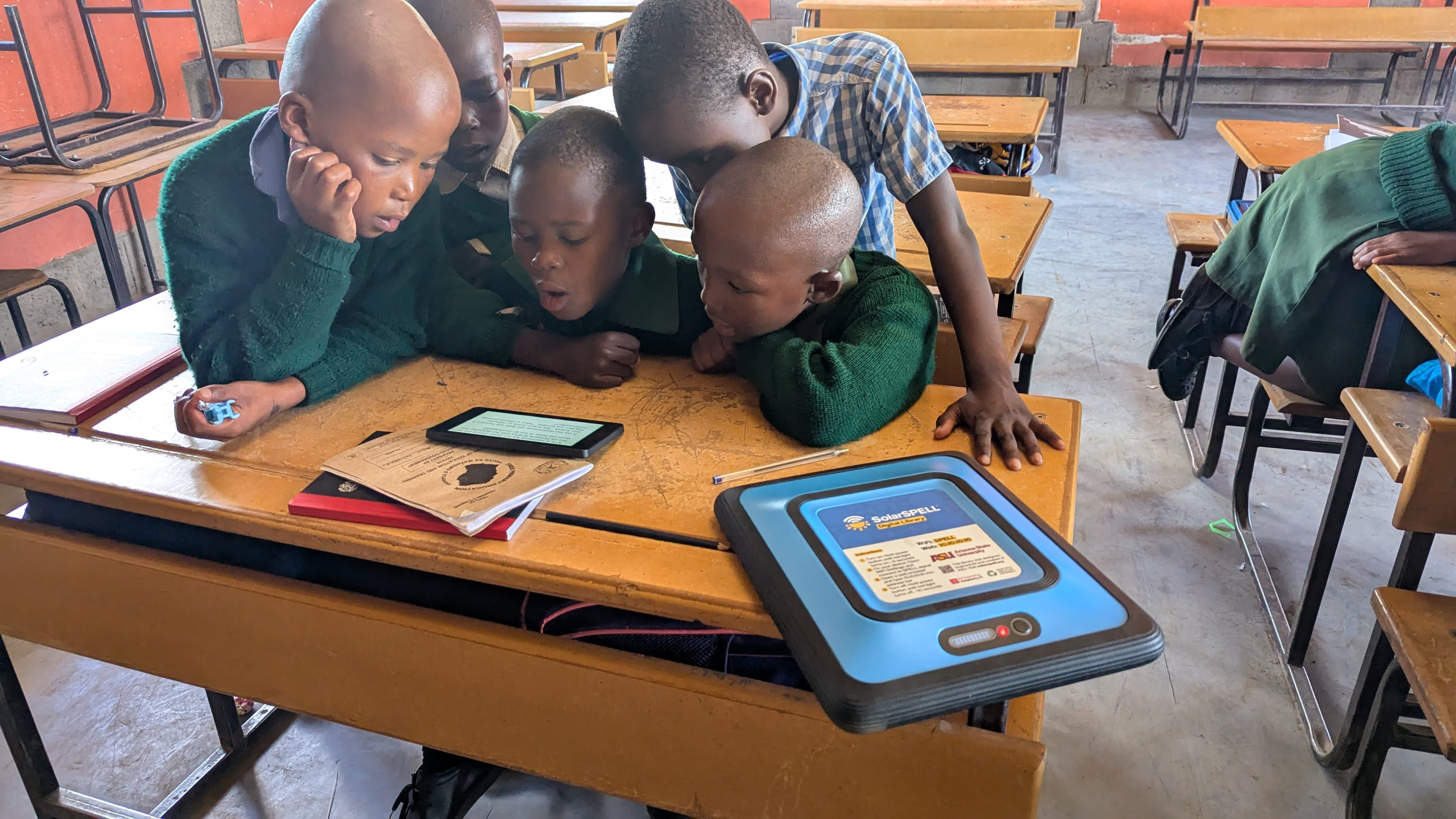
Elementary students in Lesotho access content on the SolarSPELL digital library through their respective tablet.

The SolarSPELL library is used by students and teachers in classrooms that may struggle with access to resources. In one study, after a SolarSPELL was used in a 10th grade biology class at Simon Sanchez High School in Guam, there was significant improvement in learning and education for the high schoolers, including for youth with special needs. The use of SolarSPELL in this class resulted in higher-than-average biology test scores and a reduction in student disruptive behavior in class.

The digital library is also used, locally, in Arizona by the Hopi Nation and the Phoenix Fire Department. These organizations access health and medical resources on the digital libraries.

SolarSPELL has collaborated with non-profit and governmental organizations worldwide, including the Peace Corps, Voice of America, and more.
