= RideAustin =

Nonprofit ride-hailing service

RideAustin was a nonprofit ride-hailing service based in Austin, Texas, that operated from 2016 to 2020. It began providing rides after Uber and Lyft suspended their Austin services following a dispute over municipal requirements for driver background checks. RideAustin allowed passengers to request rides through a mobile application and donate to local charities by rounding up their fares. The service permanently closed in June 2020, following a suspension of operations during the COVID-19 pandemic.

== History ==
=== Establishment ===
RideAustin was announced on May 23, 2016, at the Highball, a venue associated with Alamo Drafthouse Cinema. Technology entrepreneurs Joe Liemandt and Andy Tryba participated in its establishment, with Tryba serving as chief executive officer. The organization began providing rides in June 2016.

Its creation followed a dispute between the City of Austin and ride-hailing companies over an ordinance requiring fingerprint-based background checks for drivers. Uber and Lyft supported a ballot proposition intended to overturn the requirements. After voters rejected the proposition in May 2016, both companies suspended their Austin services. RideAustin was among the alternative operators that entered the market and agreed to comply with the city’s regulations.

=== State regulation and competition ===
On May 29, 2017, Texas Governor Greg Abbott signed House Bill 100, establishing statewide regulation of transportation network companies and overriding local requirements such as Austin’s fingerprinting rules. The legislation required companies to obtain a permit from the Texas Department of Licensing and Regulation and conduct annual criminal background checks on drivers, but did not require fingerprinting. Uber and Lyft resumed service in Austin that day.

The legislation generally reserved regulation of transportation network companies to the state, while retaining specified powers for airports and cruise terminals and preserving local authority over generally applicable traffic rules.

In June 2017, The Texas Tribune reported that RideAustin’s weekly rides had fallen from approximately 59,000 immediately before Uber and Lyft returned to approximately 22,000. Tryba attributed the decline to competition and the seasonal departure of university students. The organization responded by reducing fares, staffing, and operating expenses, including closing its headquarters.

=== Closure ===
RideAustin suspended operations in late March 2020 because of the COVID-19 pandemic. Although ride-hailing remained classified as an essential business in Austin, Tryba cited safety concerns in explaining the suspension. The organization announced its permanent closure in June 2020. At the time, it reported having provided approximately three million rides and helped raise $450,000 for local nonprofits during its four years of operation.

=== Operations ===
RideAustin operated through a mobile application and used a nonprofit business model. By June 2017, it did not deduct a commission from standard ride fares. Passengers could use the application to round up their fares and donate the difference to local charities.

At its launch, the founders also announced plans to make trip data available to researchers. They presented data sharing as part of the organization’s nonprofit approach, alongside compliance with Austin’s reporting requirements for ride-hailing operators.
