= Willamette Week =

Alternative weekly newspaper in published in Portland, Oregon

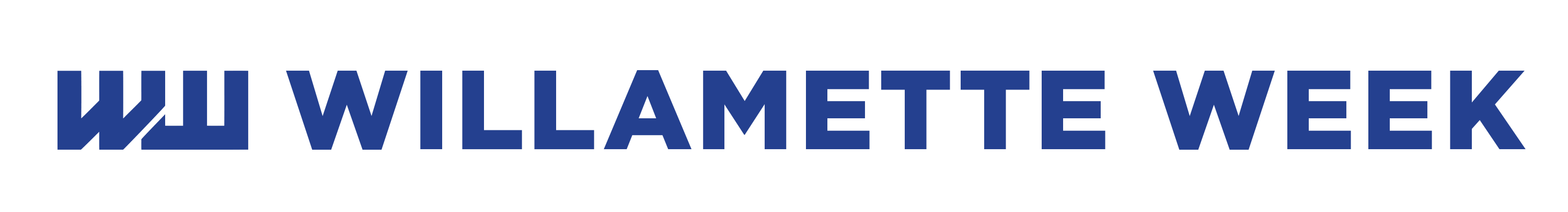

- Cover
- Type: Alternative weekly
- Format: Tabloid
- Owner: City of Roses Newspapers
- Founder: Ronald A. Buel
- Publisher: Anna Zusman (2023–)
- Editor: Mark Zusman
- Founded: November 1974
- Headquarters: 2220 NW Quimby St. Portland, OR 97210; US
- Circulation: 25,000 (as of 2023)
- ISSN: 2640-5857 (print); 2997-5735 (web)
- OCLC number: 54813570
- Website: wweek.com

Willamette Week (WW) is an alternative weekly newspaper and a website published in Portland, Oregon, United States, since 1974. It features reports on local news, politics, sports, business, and culture.

== History ==
=== Early history ===
Willamette Week was founded in 1974 by Ronald A. Buel, who served as its first publisher. It was later owned by the Eugene Register-Guard, which sold it in the fall of 1983 to Richard H. Meeker and Mark Zusman, who took the positions of publisher and editor, respectively. Meeker had been one of the paper's first reporters, starting in 1974, and Zusman had joined the paper as a business writer in 1982. Meeker and Zusman formed City of Roses Newspaper Company to publish WW and a sister publication, Fresh Weekly, a free guide to local arts and entertainment. WW had a paid circulation at that time, with about 12,000 subscribers.

=== Post-merger ===
A major change was made in January 1984, when Fresh Weekly was merged into WW, the paper's print run was increased to 50,000 and paid circulation was discontinued, with WW thereafter being distributed free. WW increased circulation to 90,000 copies by 2007. Circulation has declined to 50,000 by March 2020.

In June 2015, Richard Meeker stepped down as Willamette Week's publisher, after more than 31 years in the position. Editor Mark Zusman succeeded him as publisher, while also retaining the editorship. Meeker planned to continue working for the City of Roses Newspaper Company, WW's owner.

== Finances ==
Since 1984, the paper has been free; as of 2007 over 80% of its revenue was generated through display advertising. For 2007, its revenue was expected to be about $6.25 million, a four or five percent increase over 2006, a growth that occurred in spite of a significant decline in classified advertising that the publisher attributed to competition from Craigslist. Its pre-tax profit in 2006 was around 5%, a third to a half of what large mass-media companies require.

== Notable stories ==
Notable stories first reported by WW include:

- In 2004, making public Neil Goldschmidt's long-concealed sexual misconduct with a 14-year-old girl. Goldschmidt, a former Oregon governor, was mayor of Portland at the time of the abuse. After Willamette Week contacted him for comments regarding its upcoming story about that alleged misconduct, Goldschmidt went ahead and confessed to the relationship in an interview published in The Oregonian. That interview ran prior to Willamette Week's report appearing in print, and was intended to preempt the story's publication. However, the alternative weekly did finally get the scoop, breaking the Goldschmidt story first on its website. Nigel Jaquiss won the 2005 Pulitzer Prize for investigative reporting for his work on that story.
- In 2008, Willamette Week's Beth Slovic drew a conclusion that former senator Gordon Smith employed undocumented workers at his frozen-foods processing operation in Eastern Oregon while acknowledging that she has no definitive proof.
- In 2009, reporting that then-City Commissioner Sam Adams engaged in a sexual relationship with a legislative intern, Beau Breedlove. Rumors of a relationship between the two men had circulated during Adams' campaign for mayor, but Adams denied any sexual relationship. Only after Willamette Week contacted Adams for comment on an upcoming story did he admit publicly that there had been a sexual relationship. However, he stipulated that there had been no relationship between them until after Breedlove turned 18. Adams said he'd previously lied about the relationship in order to avoid feeding negative stereotypes of gay men as somehow predatory.
- In 2015, then-Governor John Kitzhaber's fiancee, Cylvia Hayes, confirmed Willamette Week's report that she married an 18-year-old Ethiopian immigrant in 1997 in exchange for a $5,000 payment so that he could keep his residency to attend school in United States.

== Alumni ==
Journalists, writers and artists who have worked at Willamette Week include:

- Mindy Aloff, dance critic and essayist
- Byron Beck, blogger
- John Callahan, cartoonist
- Katherine Dunn, author
- Phil Keisling, former Oregon Secretary of State
- Susan Orlean, author

== See also ==
- The Santa Fe Reporter, also published by Richard Meeker and Mark Zusman from 1997 to 2024.
- Indy Week (Durham, N.C.), also published by Meeker & Zusman since 2012.
