= Eure (surname) =

Eure is a surname, and may refer to:

- Casey Eure (born 1978), American law enforcement officer and politician from Mississippi
- Francis Eure (c.1564–1621), English politician and judge, son of William Eure, 2nd Baron Eure
- George Eure, 6th Baron Eure (died 1672), Parliamentary supporter of the English Civil War
- Peter Eure (c.1549–1612), English politician
- Ralph Eure (died 1545), English military administrator and politician, son of William Eure, 1st Baron Eure
- Ralph Eure, 3rd Baron Eure (1558–1617), English nobleman and politician
- Sampson Eure (died 1659), English lawyer and politician
- Tazewell A. Eure (1875– 1954), American banker and politician from North Carolina
- Thad A. Eure (1899–1993), American politician and long-serving North Carolina Secretary of State
- Wesley Eure (born 1951), American actor, singer, producer and director
- William Eure, English nobleman of the 16th century, son of William Eure, 2nd Baron Eure
- William Eure, 1st Baron Eure (c.1483–1548), English soldier active on the Anglo-Scottish borders
- William Eure, 2nd Baron Eure (1529–1594), English soldier and official
- William Eure, 4th Baron Eure (c. 1579–1646), English nobleman

== See also ==
- Euer
- Ewer
- Ewers
- Evers
- Eyre (surname)
