= Evers =

Evers is a Low German and Dutch patronymic surname meaning "son of Evert/Everhard" (High German Eberhard, English Everard). Variants include Everse, Everts and Evertsz. In 2000, there were about 10,000 people sharing the Evers surname in the United States.

Notable people with the surname include:

- Albert Evers (1868 – c. 1890), English footballer
- Alfonso Delgado Evers (born 1942), Argentinian clergyman
- Alf Evers (1905–2004), American historian
- Bettina Evers (born 1981), German ice hockey forward
- Bill Evers (born 1954), American baseball player and coach
- Bloeme Evers-Emden (1926–2016), Dutch child psychologist
- Bram Evers (1886–1952), Dutch track athlete
- Brenny Evers (born 1978), Dutch footballer
- Brooke Evers (born 1985), Australian television personality
- Caroline Evers-Swindell (born 1978), New Zealand rower
- Charles Evers (1922–2020), American civil rights activist, brother of Medgar
- Christopher Evers (1564–1590), English Catholic martyred priest
- Denis Evers (1913–2007), English cricketer and WWII pilot
- Diane Evers (born 1956), Australian tennis player
- Diane Evers (politician) (born 1963), Australian politician
- Edvard Evers (1853–1919), Swedish priest and hymnwriter
- Edwin Evers (born 1971), Dutch drummer and radio presenter
- Edwin Evers (fisherman) (born 1974), American bass fisherman
- Floris Evers (born 1983), Dutch field hockey player
- Frank Evers (disambiguation)
- Georgina Evers-Swindell (born 1978), New Zealand rower
- Greg Evers (1955–2017), American politician
- Guy Evers (1874–1959), English rugby player
- Harold Evers (1876–1937), Australian cricketer
- Hoot Evers (1921–1991), American baseball player
- Jason Evers (1922–2005), American actor
- Joe Evers (1891–1949), American baseball player
- Johnny Evers (1883–1947), American baseball player
- Jürgen Evers (born 1964), German athlete
- Kai-Bastian Evers (born 1990), German footballer
- Karin Evers-Meyer (born 1949), German politician
- L. H. Evers (1926–1985), Australian writer
- Lance Evers (born 1969), Canadian wrestler known as Lance Storm
- Lisa Evers (born 1963), American television personality
- Maike Evers (born 1980), Australian fashion model and television personality
- Marc Evers (born 1991), Dutch Paralympic swimmer
- Matt Evers (born 1976), American figure skater
- Medgar Evers (1925–1963), American civil rights activist
- Meike Evers (born 1977), German rower
- Mervyn Evers, Archdeacon of Lahore (1940–1944)
- Myrlie Evers-Williams (born 1933), American civil rights activist, widow of Medgar
- Nick Evers (1937–2013), Australian politician
- Nico Evers-Swindell (born 1979), New Zealand actor
- Raphael Evers (born 1954), Dutch Rabbi
- Reinbert Evers (1949–2022), German musician
- Richard Evers (born 1959), Canadian publisher, programmer, technology consultant and author
- Sean Evers (born 1977), English footballer
- Sean Evers (born 1975), American tattoo artist
- Shoshanna Evers (1980–2021), American author of erotic romance
- Stefan Evers (born 1979), German politician
- Stuart Evers (born 1976), British novelist, short story writer and critic
- Sybil Evers (1904–1963), English singer and actress
- Ties Evers (born 1991), Dutch footballer
- Tom Evers (1852–1925), American baseball player
- Tony Evers (born 1951), American politician and educator
- Williamson Evers (born c. 1949), American education activist, educator, politician

== Fictional characters ==
- Bob Evers, main character of a 35-volume children's book series by Willy van der Heide
- Lily Evers, maiden name of Harry Potter's mother in the Dutch translation ("Evans" in original)
- Jim Evers, a character in the 2003 film The Haunted Mansion
- Tony "Duke" Evers, character in "Rocky" series of films
- Michael Evers, a character in the film TiMER
- Susan Evers Hayley Mills & Mitch Evers Brian Keith; One of the twin sisters, and the father of the twins, in the original Disney movie The Parent Trap (1961)

== See also ==
- Jan Everse Sr (1922–1974), Dutch footballer
- Jan Everse (born 1954), Dutch footballer
- Ever (disambiguation)
- Everts (disambiguation)
- Ewers
