= 2019 Durham mayoral election =

Durham mayoral election, 2019
- November 5, 2019
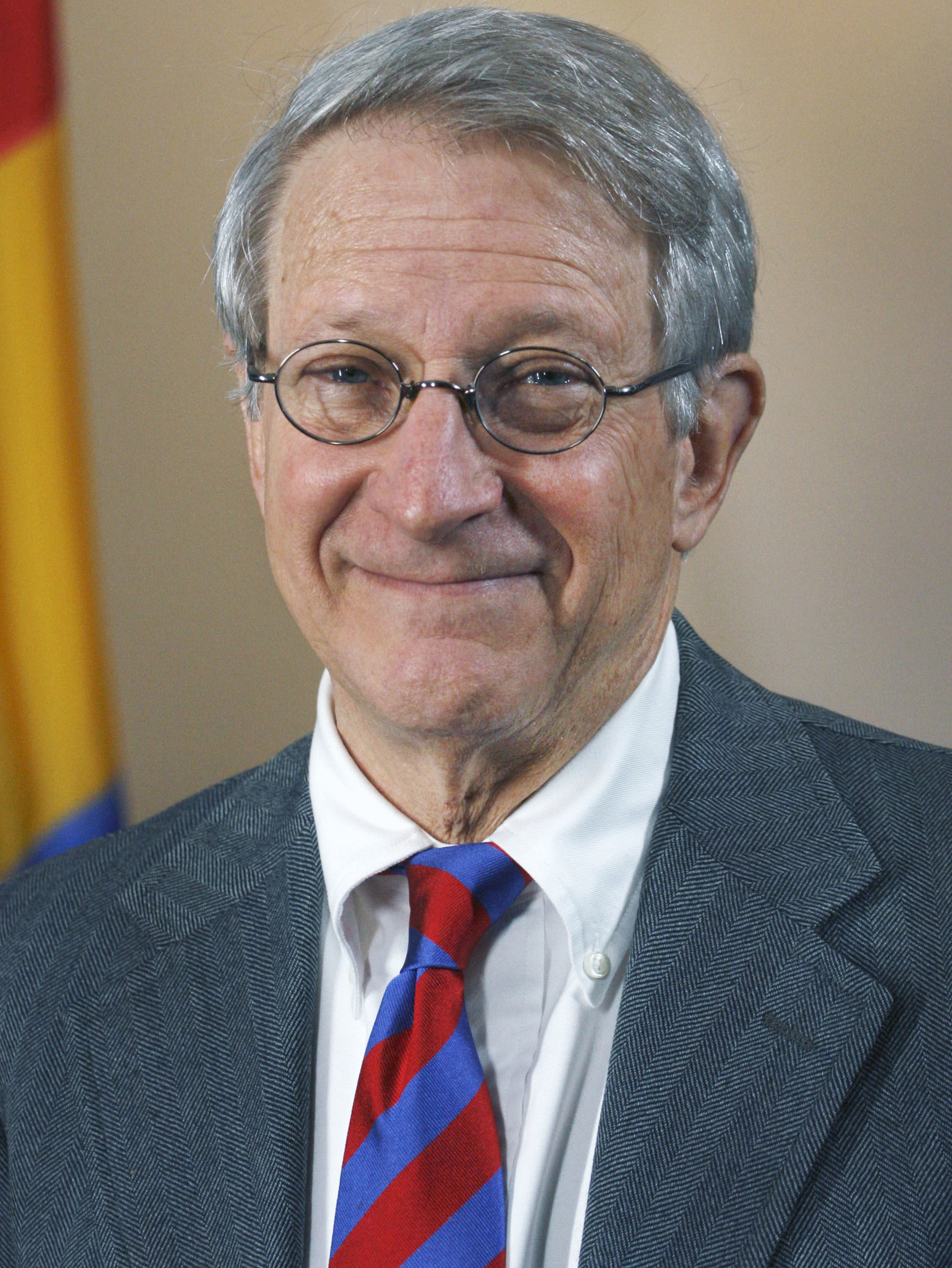

Candidate	Steve Schewel	Sylvester Williams
Party	Nonpartisan	Nonpartisan
Popular vote	28,847	5,499
Percentage	83.40%	15.90%
Mayor before election
Steve Schewel
Nonpartisan
Elected mayor
Steve Schewel
Nonpartisan

The 2019 Durham mayoral election was held on November 5, 2019, to elect the mayor of Durham, North Carolina. Steve Schewel was elected to a second term as mayor.

The only other candidate to file to run before the deadline was Sylvester Williams, a pastor who also ran for mayor in 2011, 2013, and 2017. Because only two candidates filed to run, the October primary election was cancelled.

== Candidates ==
- Steve Schewel, mayor of Durham since 2017
- Sylvester Williams, candidate for mayor in 2011, 2013, and 2017

== Results ==
General election results
Candidate	Votes	%
Steve Schewel (incumbent)	28,847	83.40
Sylvester Williams	5,499	15.90
Write-ins	244	0.71
Total votes	34,590	100
