= Ewer (surname) =

Ewer is a surname, and may refer to:

- Alfred Ewer (1867–1935), British trade unionist
- Bobby Ewer (1904–1995), ustralian rules footballer
- Charles Ewer (died 1742), English politician
- Fred Ewer (1898–1971), English footballer
- Isaac Ewer (died c.1650), English soldier and one of the Regicides of King Charles I of England
- John Ewer (died 1774), English bishop
- Katie Ewer, British immunologist
- Philemon Ewer (1702–1750), English shipbuilder
- Thomas Ewer (died 1790), English politician
- William Ewer (banker) (1720–1789), English merchant, banker and politician
- William Norman Ewer (1885–1976), British journalist

== See also ==
- Euer
- Eure (surname)
- Ewers
