= Asa T. Spaulding Jr. =

American politician (1934–2015)

Asa Timothy Spaulding Jr. (September 21, 1934 – October 25, 2015) was an American businessman and politician.

== Early life ==
Asa Timothy Spaulding Jr. was born on September 21, 1934, in Durham, North Carolina, United States. He was the eldest child of Asa T. Spaulding Sr. and Elna Bridgeforth Spaulding. He graduated from Hillside High School in Durham.

He married Shirley Atwell in 1958.

== Business career ==
In 1952 Spaulding began working for Metropolitan Life Insurance Company in New York City during his summer breaks in between his college semesters.

In May 1977 Spaulding was hired by Durham Life Broadcasting to serve as the public affairs director of its station WPTF-TV. In January 1979 he became the overall company's public affairs director, and in August he became its vice president for administration.

Later in his career, Spaulding founded a management consulting firm, Asa Spaulding and Associates.

== Civic and political activities ==
While his family were largely members of the Democratic Party, in 1972 Spaulding joined the Republican Party, believing that more blacks should involve themselves with the party. In June 1976 he filed as a candidate for the Republican nomination to seek office of North Carolina Secretary of State. He faced Cy Nanney in the August Republican primary, winning with 63 percent of the vote and becoming the first black man to win a statewide major party nomination in the Southern United States since the Reconstruction era. In the general election he faced Democratic incumbent Thad A. Eure, who had held the office for 40 years. Spaulding's supporters dubbed their candidate "the black cat after the barn's old rat" in reference to Eure's self-declared moniker, "oldest rat in the Democratic barn". Spaulding attributed widespread ignorance of the secretary of state's responsibilities to the elderly Eure, and said he would "revive the office" by raising public awareness of its functions. He also pledged to create a small business aid agency in the office, and supported transferring the state's ombudsman program from the governor's office to the secretary of state. He also criticized Eure for having only two black employees, despite having garnered significant black electoral support in the 1972 election.

Spaulding was endorsed by the Greensboro Daily News and the Winston-Salem Journal. He hoped to build a coalition of independent voters and blacks disenchanted with Howard Nathaniel Lee's defeat in the Democratic primary for lieutenant governor to prevail over Eure. When asked if he thought he could win in a state which had never elected a black person to statewide office, Spaulding said, "I would not have offered myself if I did not think I could win." He was defeated in the November election, taking only 33 percent of the vote.

Spaulding served on the University of North Carolina Board of Governors from 1981 to 1993, and was the body's secretary from 1988 to 1990. He launched a candidacy during the 1983 Durham mayoral election, taking two months off work to campaign and garnering the endorsement of civil rights activist Jesse Jackson. His campaign struggled due to a lack of endorsements from local civic groups and the resignation of his first campaign manager due to a disagreement over strategy. He lost the November 8 contest to incumbent Charles Markham, attributing his defeat to voters' lack of recognition of him. In April 1994 he was hired as the president of Barber-Scotia College to ameliorate its financial problems. He was dismissed by the board of trustees in September, following complaints that his leadership style was heavy-handed, including his decision to lay off all of the institution's professors.

In 2002, Spaulding became chairman of the Southern Coalition of Black Republican Advocates.

== Later life ==
Spaulding died at his home in Durham on October 25, 2015, after a lengthy illness.

== Works cited ==
- Betts, Jack (August 1989). "The Department of the Secretary of State: Which Way Now?" (PDF). North Carolina Insight. pp. 2–20.

Party political offices
Preceded by Grace Rohrer	Republican nominee for North Carolina Secretary of State; 1976	Succeeded by David Flaherty
