= Tazewell A. Eure =

American politician and banker (1875–1954)

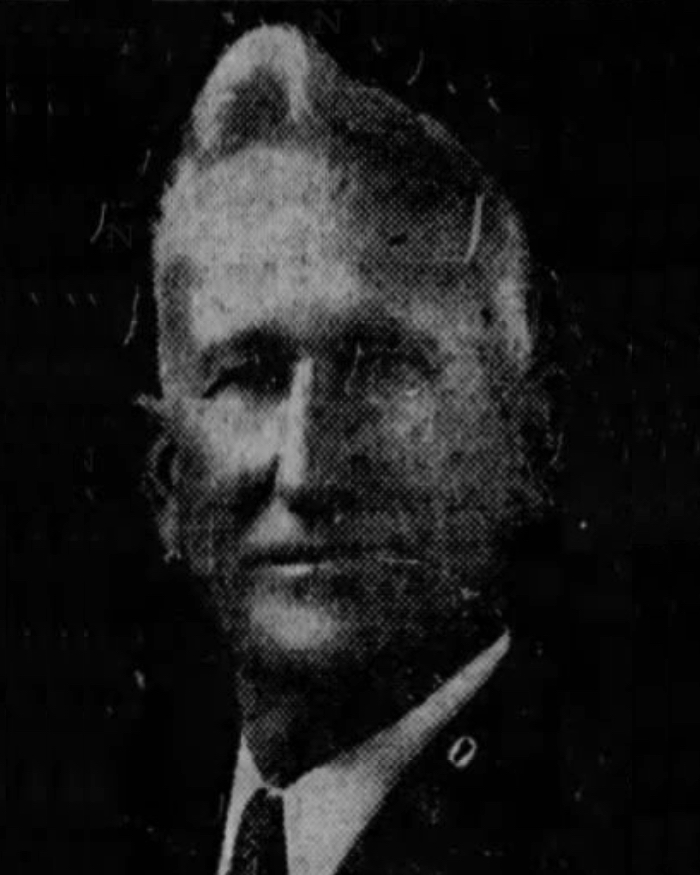

Member of the North Carolina House of Representatives from Gates County
- In office 1925–1929
- Preceded by: Richard W. Simpson
- Succeeded by: Thomas W. Costen

Personal details
- Born: Tazewell Augustus Eure; April 5, 1875 Gates, North Carolina, U.S.
- Died: April 6, 1954 (aged 79) Eure, North Carolina, U.S.
- Party: Democratic
- Spouses: Armecia Langstun (m. 1899–1916); Lucie Johnson (m. 1920)
- Children: 6, including Thad
- Education: North Carolina College of Agriculture and Mechanic Arts

Tazewell Augustus Eure (April 5, 1875 – April 6, 1954) was an American banker, farmer, and politician who served in the North Carolina House of Representatives, representing his native Gates County from 1925 to 1929. His son, Thad, served in the House from 1929 to 1931 and as North Carolina Secretary of State from 1936 to 1989.
