= Ewer (disambiguation) =

An ewer is a vase-shaped pitcher.

Ewer may also refer to:

== People ==
- Ewer (surname)

== Other uses ==
- Ewer Airport, an airport in Ewer, Indonesia
- Ewer Pass, a pass on Laurie Island in the Antarctic, named after John R. Ewer
- Ewer & Co, British music publisher later incorporated into Novello & Co

== See also ==
- Ewers, people with the surname Ewers
