= 2007 Durham mayoral election =

Durham mayoral election, 2007
- November 6, 2007
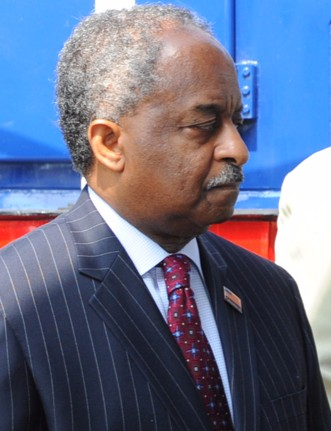

Candidate	Bill Bell	Thomas Stith III
Party	Nonpartisan	Nonpartisan
Popular vote	18,835	13,451
Percentage	58.15%	41.53%
Mayor before election
Bill Bell
Democratic
Elected mayor
Bill Bell
Democratic

The 2007 Durham mayoral election was held on November 6, 2007, to elect the mayor of Durham, North Carolina. It saw the reelection of incumbent mayor Bill Bell.

== Results ==
General election results
Candidate	Votes	%
Bill Bell (incumbent)	18,835	58.15
Thomas Stith III	13,451	41.53
Write-in	103	0.32
Total votes	32,389	
