= Mable Parker McLean =

American academic administrator (1992–2012)

President of Barber–Scotia College
- In office 1974–1988
- Preceded by: John Gresham
- Succeeded by: Tyrone Burkette
- In office 1994–1996
- Preceded by: Asa T. Spaulding Jr.

Personal details
- Born: Mable Parker; 1922
- Died: January 27, 2012 (aged 89)
- Children: 1
- Education: Barber–Scotia College; Johnson C. Smith University; Howard University

Mable Parker McLean (1922 – January 27, 2012) was an American academic administrator who served two terms as president of Barber–Scotia College from 1974 to 1988 and 1994 to 1996.

== Life ==
McLean was born in 1922 and was raised near Southern Pines in Moore County, North Carolina. Her mother died when she was nine years old and she was raised with her younger sister by aunts and her grandmothers. She moved from Carthage to Concord in 1939. McLean completed her first two years of undergraduate studies at Barber–Scotia College, graduating in 1941. She finished a bachelor's degree in education from Johnson C. Smith University.

McLean worked as an elementary school teacher. She served as an instructor at Bowie State University. She completed a master's degree in education at Howard University. She completed post-graduate studies at Northwestern University, Catholic University of America, and Harvard University. From 1947 to 1963, she was an instructor at Johnson C. Smith University. She was a professor and head of the elementary education department at Barber–Scotia College from 1963 to 1973. From 1973 to 1974, she was a college dean. In 1974, McLean became its ninth president, succeeding John Gresham. She was the first female president. At the time, she was the nation's only Black woman college president. She was succeeded by Tyrone Burkette in 1988.

In 1986, she became the first female elected chair of the council of presidents of the United Negro College Fund. In 1993, she was inducted into the National Black College Hall of Fame. From 1994 to 1996, she returned to Barber–Scotia College as its president, succeeding Asa T. Spaulding Jr.. She served as its interim president in 2006.

== Personal life ==
McLean married Earl McLean, her high school sweetheart in 1955. They had a son. Earl died in 1981. McLean died on January 27, 2012, from heart failure.
