= Durham Performing Arts Center =

Theater in North Carolina, United States

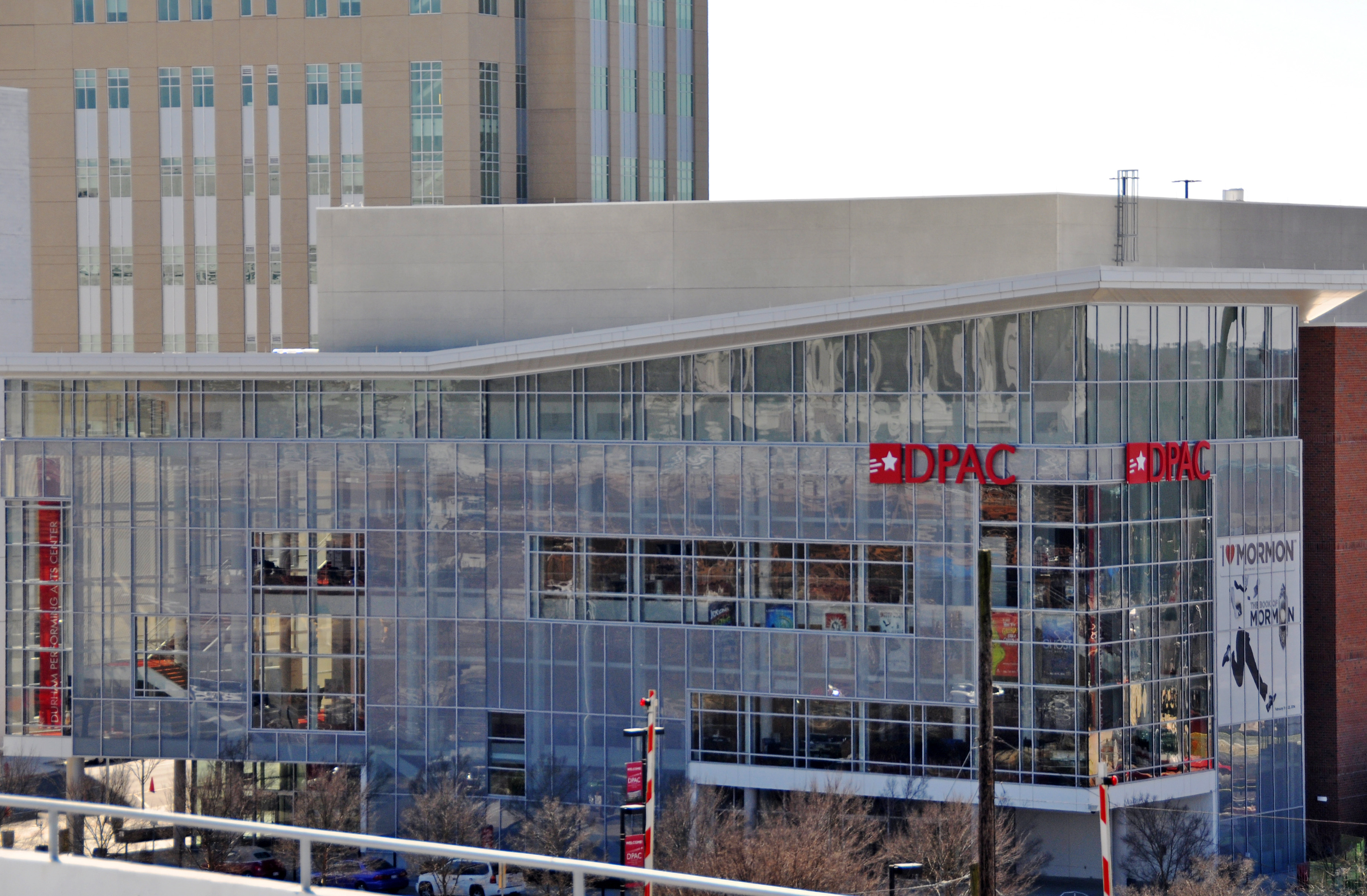
- Interactive map of Durham Performing Arts Center
- Address: 123 Vivian Street; Durham, North Carolina; United States
- Coordinates: 35°59′36″N 78°54′08″W
- Owner: City of Durham
- Operator: Nederlander Organization and Professional Facilities Management
- Capacity: 2,712
- Type: performing arts center

Construction
- Opened: November 30, 2008
- Architect: Szostak Design

Website
- www.dpacnc.com

The Durham Performing Arts Center (often called the DPAC) opened November 30, 2008 as the largest performing arts center in the Carolinas at a cost of $48 million. The DPAC hosts over 200 performances a year including touring Broadway productions, high-profile concert and comedy events, family shows and the American Dance Festival. Operated under the direction of Nederlander and Professional Facilities Management (PFM), DPAC has twice been listed as the #1 performing arts organization in the Triangle region by the Triangle Business Journal. Construction of the DPAC was part of a larger plan to redevelop downtown Durham by the Capitol Broadcasting Company, and includes other nearby properties such as the American Tobacco Historic District, the Durham Bulls Athletic Park, and the studios of the CBC-owned Fox 50 TV station.

Listed three times in the top 50 in Pollstar magazine's worldwide theater attendance ranking, in 2011 DPAC was the #1 U.S. Theater in the listing with a capacity under 4,000 and #4 ranked Theater among all U.S. Theaters. On August 16, 2016, the venue surpassed 3 million visitors since its opening.

== Costs and history ==
The theater was developed by the American Center for the Performing Arts Associates, a joint venture between Philip Szostak Associates and Garfield Traub Development of Dallas, Texas. The architect was Szostak Design Inc. of Chapel Hill, North Carolina.

The theater holds 2,712. The first event on opening night was a concert given by B. B. King. The theater is owned by the city of Durham. After talks with ClearChannel fell through, the City negotiated a theater operating agreement with Nederlander Organization and Professional Facilities Management. The operator guarantees a minimum of 100 event performances per year on a rolling three-year average and absorbs any losses for the first five years of operation, at which time the operator could return the management to the city or negotiate the terms of continued third-party management of the theater with the city.

The city borrowed $33.7 million for the center's construction through certificates of participation ("COPs"), instruments commonly used to finance municipal facilities. Debt service payments on COPs are subject to annual appropriation by the city, and as such are considered an annual operating expense rather than a long-term capital obligation. Accordingly, a voter referendum was not required for the issuance of the COPs. Additional sources of funds for the project include facility naming rights, a Duke University contribution, an operator loan, and several other sources. The Duke University contribution equaled $7.5 million. The theater hosts, on favorable rental terms, the seven-week American Dance Festival summer series, which had previously been presented in the 1,232-seat Page Auditorium at Duke University. The cost to the city for the $33.7 million in bonds will be almost $70 million over 28 years.

Naming rights were budgeted to bring in $800,000 annually, but in 2007 when the project was $400,000 under that estimate, the city agreed to draw up to $200,000 a year from its general fund to partially make up the difference. The Durham city council agreed to an additional $200,000 request in April 2009 for video and trash facility installation. While the city has had some success with naming rights, securing major naming rights sponsorships has been challenging due to current economic conditions.

However, the theater has far exceeded projections for attendance, activity, gross revenue, net income after operating expenses. Both the city's 40% share of theater net income and income to the city from ticket facility fee surcharges have far exceeded projections. At more than $1.2 million, the city's 40% share of theater net income in fiscal year 2009-2010 was over five times more than originally projected.

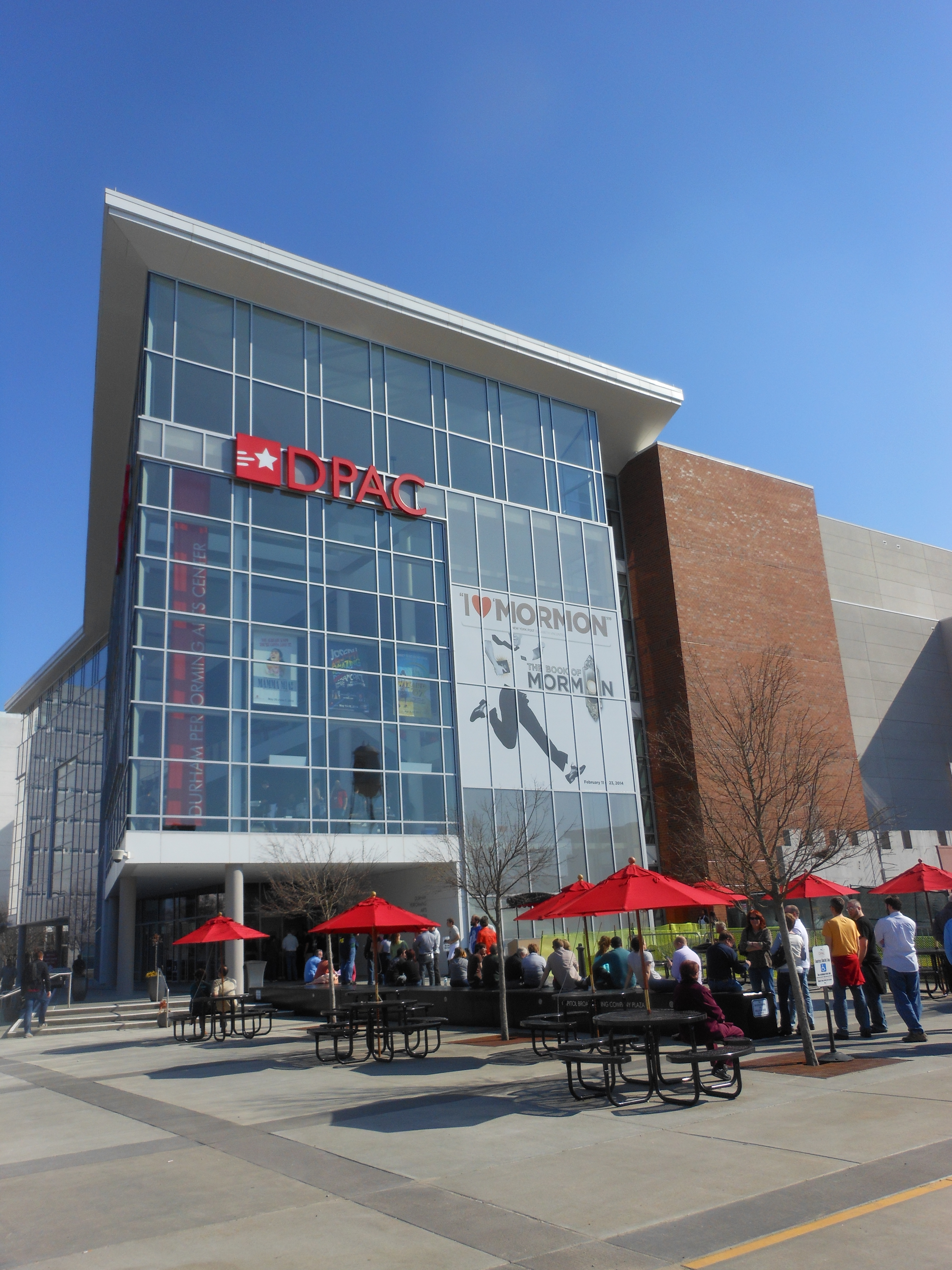
Spectators Entering Durham Performing Arts Center

Further, the theater has had far greater fiscal and economic impacts than the $7 million to $11 million original annual projections of the city's independent consultant and the Durham Convention and Visitor's Bureau ("DCVB"). The DCVB estimates that the theater had a $10.9 million economic impact to the city in the first seven months of operation. In the 2009–2010 fiscal year, the City of Durham reported that the theater had a citywide economic impact of over $24 million.

The Durham Performing Arts Center has been credited with benefiting the restaurant business in downtown Durham, in spite of the 2008–2010 recession. Five restaurants have opened in downtown Durham in proximity to the theater since its opening, significantly supported by pre- and post-show seatings generated by the theater. The theater was cited in a CNN Money and Fortune Magazine article ranking the City of Durham as number one in its list of "25 Best Places to Retire."

In spite of the sharpest decline in the travel and leisure sector in a generation due to the recent recession, the State of North Carolina ranked as the third-highest state in hospitality job growth according to the Bureau of Labor Statistics. The Durham Performing Arts Center was cited as contributing "to the growth of leisure and hospitality jobs in North Carolina over the past five years" by the Triangle Business Journal.

In 2004, the chairman of the board of what was to be DPAC's primary local booking, the American Dance Festival, said that the goals of DPAC and the goals of the festival were at odds. Although the supporters of DPAC's construction mentioned the dance festival as a primary reason for building the theatre, the festival's request for a small black box theatre was not granted. However, in 2009, the festival said that the larger theatre had solved many complaints about the festival's previous space at Duke University.

There was a $1.8 million renovation in 2017, removing seats and carpet.

In 2017, the center ranked 5th in the Pollstar list of "U.S. theater venues with the highest ticket sales". On the world scale, it ranked 6. By the middle of that year only, it had held 223 events and sold 240,351 tickets. Its highest attended Broadway shows that season were The King and I and Finding Neverland.

In 2018, the venue hosted The Color Purple.

== Controversies ==
Concerns have consistently been raised by Triangle arts supporters that the Durham theatre could hurt the nearby Carolina Theatre (also owned by the city of Durham) or the Progress Energy Center for the Performing Arts in Raleigh.

However, contrary to these concerns, the DPAC has actually benefited the Carolina Theatre through co-promotion opportunities and other policies and activities. On July 16, 2012, less than three years after the grand opening of DPAC, it was announced that the Carolina Theatre was ranked among the top 100 theaters in the world in attendance for the first time in its history.

Former Durham City Council member Thomas Stith objected when city employee Mark Greenspan lobbied the city council on behalf of the theatre's eventual contractor, Skanska, and then went to work for Skanska four months after the contract was awarded. Stith called for a "cooling-off period" for city employees, similar to those enacted by state and federal governments. The Durham City Council rejected the measure in April 2007.

== Performances ==
The theater hosts primarily national touring acts. Its first performance, which was sold out, was B.B. King. Local bookings by 2008 had included a Triangle production of A Christmas Carol and the biggest-name acts of the 2009 edition of the American Dance Festival. The venue hosted a stop of Joan Baez's final tour in September 2018 and hosted Bob Dylan in November 2018.

Chris Rock performed two stand-up shows at the venue, on April 16 and April 17, 2022, just a few weeks after the incident at the 94th Academy Awards. The prices for the two shows soared after the incident; however the shows were still completely sold out and the demand was so high that Rock had to add a third show, which he performed in June the same year.

Ellen DeGeneres performed a stand-up show at DPAC on August 7, 2024, as part of her farewell tour, Ellen's Last Stand… Up. DeGeneres used the tour as practice ahead of her Netflix special, filmed a week after her stop in Durham.

Other comedians and performers include: Tony Bennett, Carol Burnett, John Cleese, Alice Cooper, Bob Dylan, Aretha Franklin, Whoopi Goldberg, Gabriel Iglesias, Martin Lawrence, Jay Leno, Steve Martin & Martin Short, Willie Nelson, Dolly Parton, Diana Ross, Adam Sandler, Kelly Clarkson, Jerry Seinfeld, David Spade, Ringo Starr, Wanda Sykes, ZZ Top, Chris Tucker, Mike Tyson, Robin Williams and more.
