= Harry E. Rodenhizer Jr. =

American politician

Mayor of Durham, North Carolina
- In office 1991–1993
- Preceded by: Chester L. Jenkins
- Succeeded by: Sylvia S. Kerckhoff
- In office 1979–1981
- Preceded by: Wade L. Cavin
- Succeeded by: Charles Markham

Personal details
- Born: December 20, 1927 Durham, North Carolina, U.S.
- Died: October 10, 2007 (aged 79) Durham, North Carolina, U.S.
- Resting place: Maplewood Cemetery
- Party: Republican
- Spouse: Dorris Fay Taylor (m. 1950)
- Children: 4

Military service
- Allegiance: United States
- Branch/service: United States Navy
- Years of service: 1946-1948, 1950-1952
- Battles/wars: Korean War

Harry E. Rodenhizer Jr. (December 20, 1927 – October 10, 2007) was a two-time mayor of Durham, North Carolina.

== Mayoralties ==
=== First mayoralty ===
Rodenhizer was elected in the 1979 Durham mayoral election.

During Rodenhizer's first term as mayor, he was instrumental in getting the Durham Freeway extended along its modern route.

Rodenhizer lost reelection in the 1981 Durham mayoral election.

=== Second mayoralty ===
Rodenhizer was reelected to a second non-consecutive term in the 1991 Durham mayoral election.

In his second term, he laid the financial groundwork for what would become Durham Bulls Athletic Park, persuading the owner of the minor league team to keep the Bulls in Durham.

Rodenhizer lost reelection in the 1993 Durham mayoral election.

== Other activities ==
From 1978 to 2004, Rodenhizer owned and operated the Pizza Palace, a Durham institution located on Ninth Street, near Duke University's East Campus. Rodenhizer transferred ownership and day-to-day operation of the restaurant to his daughter, Faye, when it was relocated to Guess Road in 2004.

He unsuccessfully attempted to retake the mayoralty again in the 1995 Durham mayoral election.
