= 1997 Durham mayoral election =

Durham mayoral election, 1997
- November 4, 1997
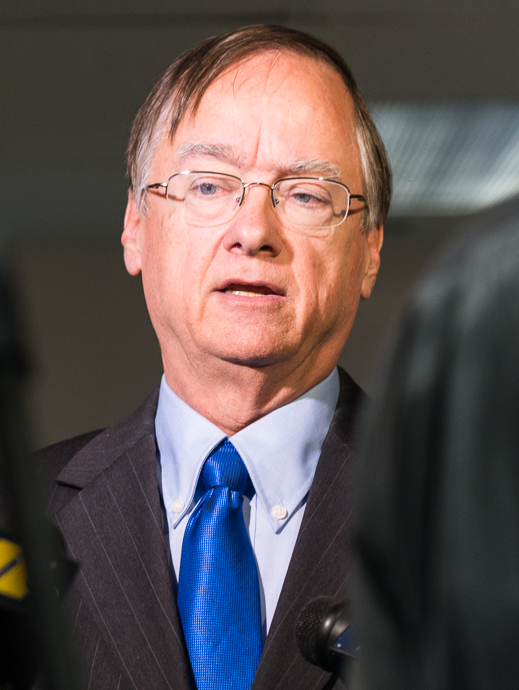

Candidate	Nick Tennyson	Ike Robinson
Party	Nonpartisan	Nonpartisan
Popular vote	15,906	13,149
Percentage	54.49%	45.05%
Mayor before election
Sylvia Kerckhoff
Elected mayor
Nick Tennyson
Republican

The 1997 Durham mayoral election was held on November 4, 1997, to elect the mayor of Durham, North Carolina. It saw the election of Nick Tennyson.

Incumbent mayor Sylvia Kerckhoff did not seek reelection.

== Results ==
=== Primary ===
The date of the primary was October 7, 1997.

Primary results
Candidate	Votes	%
Isaac "Ike" Robinson	7,188	46.40
Nick Tennyson	7,036	45.42
J.F. "Jerry" Lecky	592	3.82
Ralph M. McKinney Jr.	529	3.41
Matthew Edwin Libby	147	0.95
Total votes	15,492	

=== General election ===
General election results
Candidate	Votes	%
Nick Tennyson	15,906	54.49
Isaac "Ike" Robinson	13,149	45.05
Write ins	134	0.46
Total votes	29,189	
