= 1981 Durham mayoral election =

Durham mayoral election, 1981
- November 3, 1981
Candidate	Charles Markham	Harry E. Rodenhizer Jr.
Party	nonpartisan candidate	Nonpartisan
Popular vote	7,799	6,825
Percentage	53.33%	46.67%
Mayor before election
Harry E. Rodenhizer Jr.
Republican
Elected mayor
Charles Markham

The 1981 Durham mayoral election was held on November 3, 1981, to elect the mayor of Durham, North Carolina. It saw the election of Charles Markham, who unseated incumbent mayor Harry E. Rodenhizer Jr.

== Results ==
=== Primary ===
The date of the primary was October 6.

Candidate Jim Farthing had withdrawn on September 21, but remained on the ballot and received votes.

Primary results
Candidate	Votes	%
Charles Markham	4,275	52.12
Harry E. Rodenhizer Jr. (incumbent)	3,542	43.19
B. R. Dunn	296	3.61
Jim Farthing withdrawn	89	1.09
Total votes	8,202	

=== General election ===
General election results
Candidate	Votes	%
Charles Markham	7,799	53.33
Harry E. Rodenhizer Jr. (incumbent)	6,825	46.67
Total votes	14,624	
