= 2009 Durham mayoral election =

Durham mayoral election, 2009
- November 3, 2009
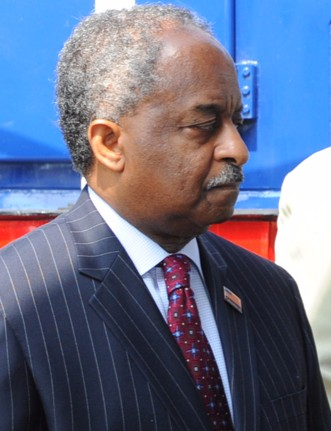

Candidate	Bill Bell	Steven Williams
Party	Nonpartisan	Nonpartisan
Popular vote	8,417	2,396
Percentage	77.46%	22.05%
Mayor before election
Bill Bell
Democratic
Elected mayor
Bill Bell
Democratic

The 2009 Durham mayoral election was held on November 3, 2009, to elect the mayor of Durham, North Carolina. It saw the reelection of incumbent mayor Bill Bell.

== Results ==
Results
Candidate	Votes	%
Bill Bell (incumbent)	8,417	77.46
Steven Williams	2,396	22.05
Write-in	53	0.49
Total votes	10,866	
