= 1995 Durham mayoral election =

Durham mayoral election, 1995
- November 7, 1995
Candidate	Sylvia Kerckhoff	Harry E. Rodenhizer Jr.
Party	nonpartisan candidate	Nonpartisan
Popular vote	13,711	6,689
Percentage	67.12%	32.73%
Mayor before election
Sylvia Kerckhoff
Elected mayor
Sylvia Kerckhoff

The 1995 Durham mayoral election was held on November 7, 1995, to elect the mayor of Durham, North Carolina. It saw the reelection of incumbent mayor Sylvia Kerckhoff.

== Results ==
=== Primary ===
The primary took place on October 10, 1995.

Primary results
Candidate	Votes	%
Sylvia Kerckhoff (incumbent)	9,938	70.82
Harry E. Rodenhizer Jr.	3,828	27.28
Kiernan T. DeAngelis	267	01.90
Total votes	14,033	

=== General election ===
General election results
Candidate	Votes	%
Sylvia Kerckhoff (incumbent)	13,711	67.12
Harry E. Rodenhizer Jr.	6,689	32.73
Write-in	31	0.15
Total votes	20,431	
