= 1999 Durham mayoral election =

Durham mayoral election, 1999
- November 2, 1999
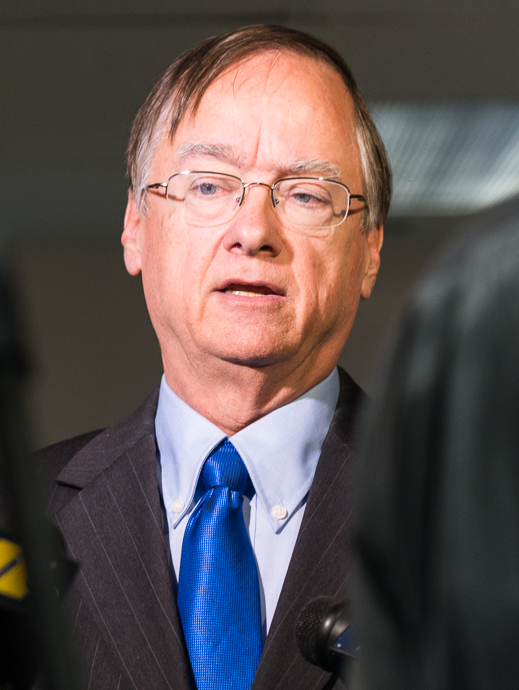

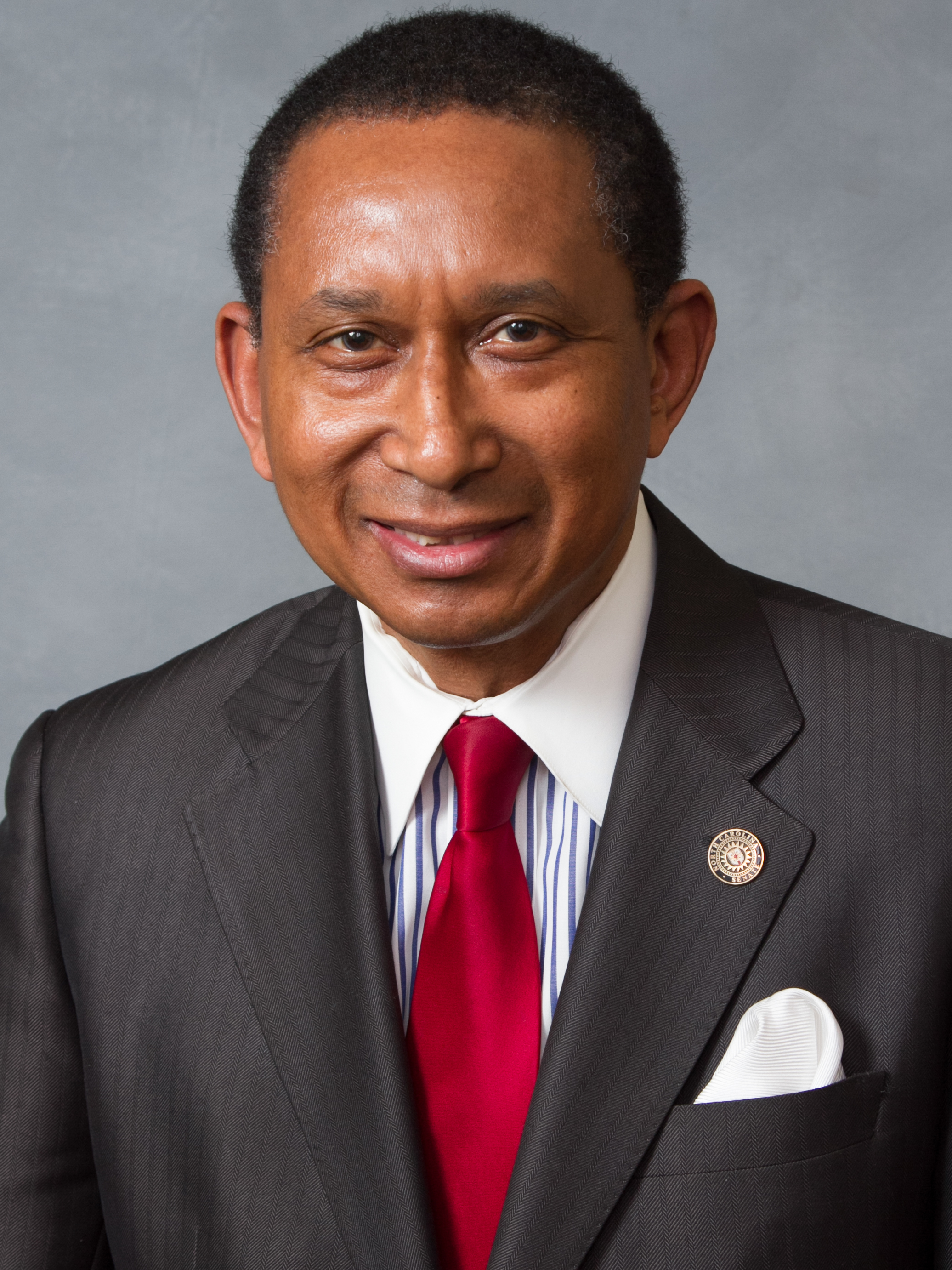
Candidate	Nick Tennyson	Floyd McKissick Jr.
Party	Nonpartisan	Nonpartisan
Popular vote	17,119	10,572
Percentage	61.45%	37.95%
Mayor before election
Nick Tennyson
Republican
Elected mayor
Nick Tennyson
Republican

The 1999 Durham mayoral election was held on November 2, 1999, to elect the mayor of Durham, North Carolina. It saw the reelection of incumbent mayor Nick Tennyson.

== Results ==
=== Primary ===
The date of the primary was October 5, 1999.

Primary results
Candidate	Votes	%
Nick Tennyson (incumbent)	7,895	39.16
Floyd McKissick Jr.	6,084	30.18
Michael Peterson	5,480	27.18
Brenda B. Burnette	223	1.11
Ralph M. McKinney Jr.	147	0.95
Total votes	15,492	

=== General election ===
General election results
Candidate	Votes	%
Nick Tennyson (incumbent)	17,119	61.45
Floyd McKissick Jr.	10,572	37.95
Write ins	169	0.61
Total votes	27,860	
