= Wib Gulley =

American politician from North Carolina

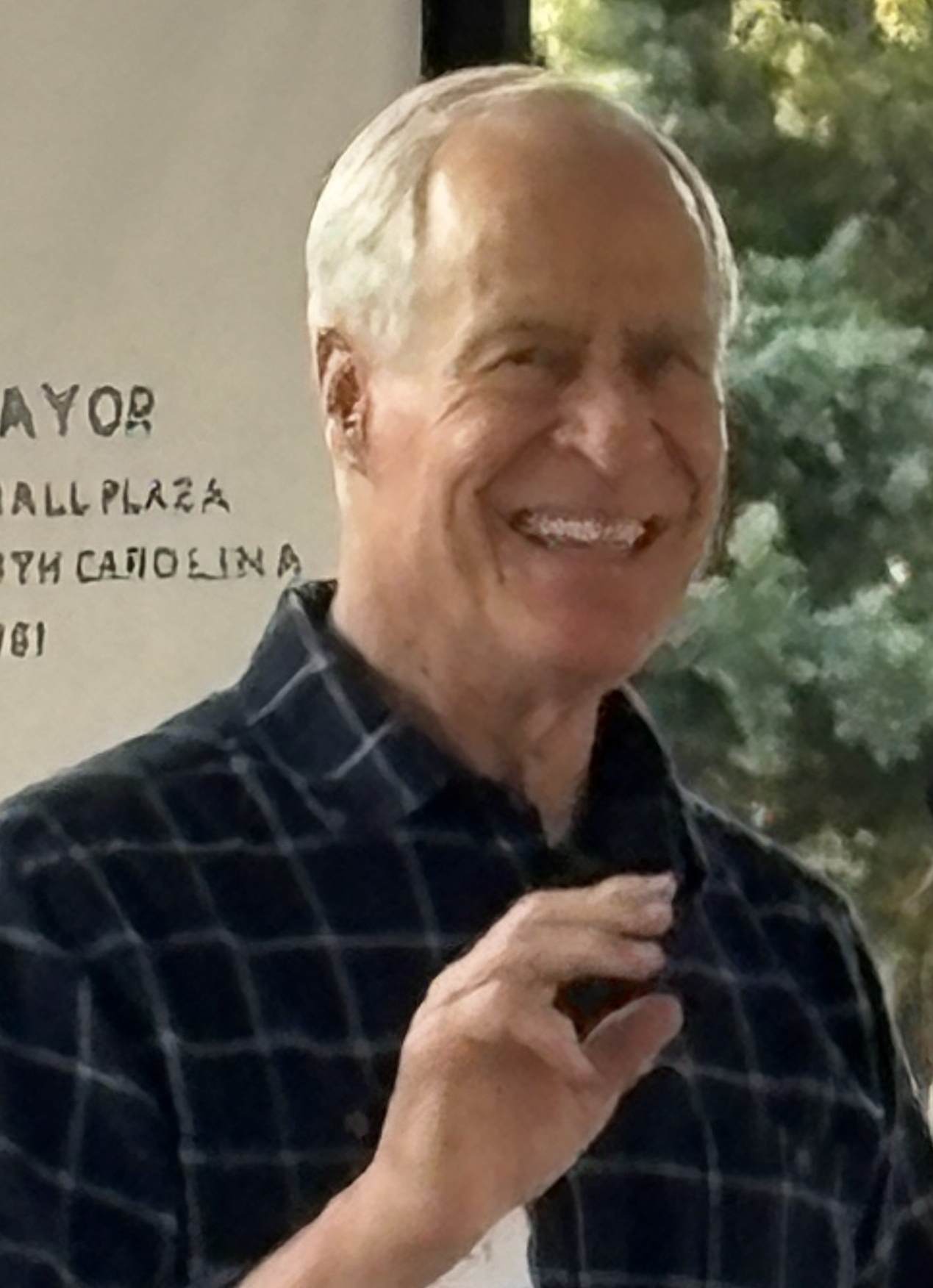
- Gulley in 2026

Member of the North Carolina Senate
- In office January 1, 1993 – March 19, 2004
- Preceded by: Ralph Hunt; Kenneth Claiborne Royall Jr.
- Succeeded by: Ralph Hunt
- Constituency: 13th District (1993-2003); 18th District (2003-2004)

Mayor of Durham, North Carolina
- In office 1985–1989
- Preceded by: Charles Markham
- Succeeded by: Chester Jenkins

Personal details
- Born: July 31, 1948 (age 78) Little Rock, Arkansas, U.S.
- Party: Democratic
- Spouse: Charlotte
- Children: 2
- Education: Duke University (BA); Northeastern University (JD)

Wilbur P. Gulley (born July 31, 1948) is an American lawyer and politician. He served as mayor of Durham, North Carolina from 1985 to 1989 and as a state senator from 1993 to 2004.

== Mayor ==
Gulley served as Mayor of Durham for two terms, from December 1985 to December 1989. As Mayor, Gulley initiated Durham's affordable housing program, led neighborhood protection and center city revitalization efforts, and negotiated the City's acquisition of the local bus system from the Duke Power Company. In 1986, he issued a proclamation designating anti-discrimination week and endorsing the Triangle Gay and Lesbian Pride March in Durham. In response, conservatives formed a coalition and launched an unsuccessful campaign to recall him.

Gulley had won election in 1985 with 55% of the vote, was reelected in 1987 with 60% of the vote. He did not run for reelection in 1989.

== State senator ==
First elected to the State Senate in November 1992, he began serving in January 1993 and served six (two year) terms in the North Carolina Senate. He represented constituents in Durham, Granville and Person counties. During his time in the state Senate, Gulley sponsored legislation that led to North Carolina's and the nation's first public financing of election campaigns for judicial office (for NC Supreme Court and NC Court of Appeals seats), as well as numerous campaign law reforms. He also led the Senate's Transportation Appropriations committee for five years, working to expand overall transportation funding with an emphasis on public transit and road maintenance. Gulley also sponsored and led efforts to prohibit predatory lending in North Carolina, helping end "payday" lending in the state, as well as being the lead sponsor for several key environmental measures.

== Post-Political Career ==
In March 2004, Gulley announced that his retirement from the General Assembly, effective 19 March 2004. He went on to serve as the General Counsel for the Triangle Transit, the regional public transit agency. In that capacity he is helping lead regional efforts to initiate passenger rail service and expanded transit options. He retired from that position in 2014.

Since retiring from Triangle Transit, Gulley has worked as an adjunct professor at Duke University's Sanford School of Public Policy in Durham, North Carolina.

== Electoral history ==
=== 2002 ===
North Carolina Senate 18th district general election, 2002
Party	Candidate	Votes	%
Democratic	Wib Gulley (incumbent)	27,335	46.23%
Republican	Tom Davidson	19,706	40.53%
Libertarian	Mark Kitchens	1,576	3.24%
Total votes		48,617	100%
Democratic hold			

=== 2000 ===
North Carolina Senate 13th district general election, 2000
Party	Candidate	Votes	%
Democratic	Wib Gulley (incumbent)	82,509	37.54%
Democratic	Jeanne Hopkins Lucas (incumbent)	76,064	34.61%
Republican	Wallace Bradsher	52,113	23.71%
Libertarian	Sean Haugh	9,102	4.14%
Total votes		219,788	100%
Democratic hold			
Democratic hold			

Political offices
Preceded by Charles Markham	Mayor of Durham, North Carolina; 1985–1989	Succeeded by Chester Jenkins
North Carolina Senate
Preceded by Ralph Hunt; Kenneth Claiborne Royall Jr.	Member of the North Carolina Senate from the 13th district 1993–2003; Served alongside: Jeanne Hopkins Lucas	Succeeded by David Weinstein
Preceded by R. C. Soles Jr.	Member of the North Carolina Senate from the 18th district 2003–2004	Succeeded by Ralph Hunt
