= 2003 Durham mayoral election =

Durham mayoral election, 2003
- November 7, 2003
- Turnout: 25.46%
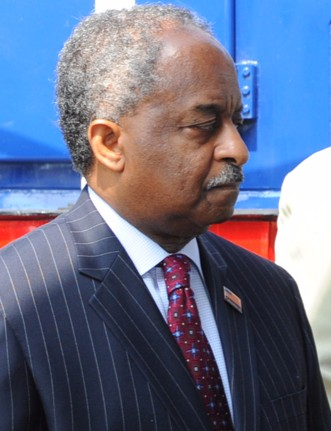

Candidate	Bill Bell	Jonathan Alston
Party	Nonpartisan	Nonpartisan
Popular vote	22,354	4,342
Percentage	83.18%	16.16%
Mayor before election
Bill Bell
Democratic
Elected mayor
Bill Bell
Democratic

The 2003 Durham mayoral election was held on November 7, 2003, to elect the mayor of Durham, North Carolina. It saw the reelection of incumbent mayor Bill Bell.

== Results ==
=== Primary ===
The date of the primary was October 7, 2003.

Primary election results
Candidate	Votes	%
Bill Bell (incumbent)	13,727	85.31
Jonathan R. Alston	1,716	10.67
Carolina James-Rivera	647	4.02
Total votes	16,090	

=== General election ===
General election results
Candidate	Votes	%
Bill Bell (incumbent)	22,354	83.18
Jonathan R. Alston	4,342	16.16
Write-in	117	0.66
Total votes	26,813	
