= Chester L. Jenkins =

American politician

Mayor of Durham, North Carolina
- In office 1989–1991
- Preceded by: Wilbur P. "Wib" Gulley
- Succeeded by: Harry E. Rodenhizer Jr.

Personal details
- Born: July 14, 1938
- Died: July 14, 2009 (aged 71) Durham, North Carolina, U.S.
- Party: Democratic
- Education: University of Ft. Lauderdale (BBA); North Carolina Central University (MBA)

Chester Luther Jenkins (July 14, 1938 – July 14, 2009) was the first African-American mayor of Durham, North Carolina, serving from 1989 to 1991, after having previously served on the Durham City Council for eight years. In 1994, following the defeat of his 1991 re-election bid, Jenkins became the city's Director of Human Relations, holding that post until late 2000.
