= Nick Tennyson =

American politician

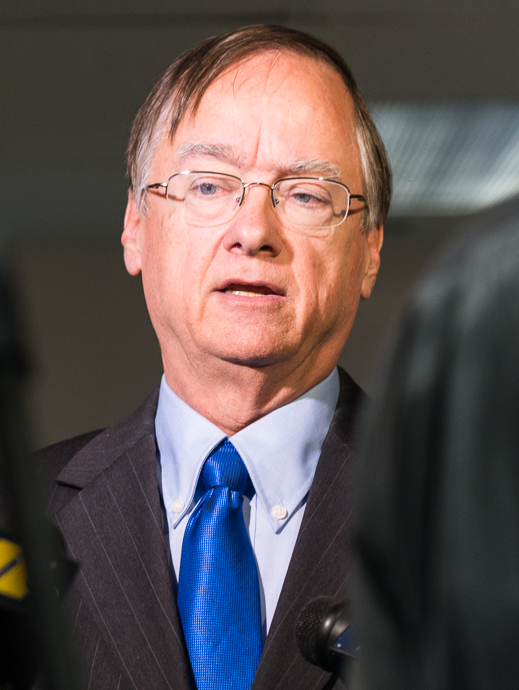

Secretary of North Carolina Department of Transportation
- In office 2015 – December 31, 2016
- Preceded by: Anthony J. Tata

Mayor of Durham, North Carolina
- In office 1997–2001
- Preceded by: Sylvia Kerckhoff
- Succeeded by: William V. Bell

Personal details
- Born: September 29, 1950 (age 75) Hot Springs, Arkansas, U.S.
- Party: Independent

Nicholas J. Tennyson (born September 29, 1950) was the Secretary of the North Carolina Department of Transportation under former Governor Pat McCrory and former two-term mayor of Durham, North Carolina.

== Mayor of Durham ==
Tennyson was mayor from 1997 to 2001. Elected in November, 1997, Tennyson was re-elected in 1999 with almost two-thirds of the vote but lost a second re-election bid to Bill Bell by fewer than 500 votes in 2001.

Public service was a family tradition as his father had served as mayor of Arkadelphia, Arkansas, in the early 1950s.

He campaigned to reduce crime, redevelop of the urban core, and increase confidence in city administration. Tennyson was an active supporter of data-based public safety efforts and instituted quarterly reports to Council – replacing the past practice of an annual report. In the spring of 1999, before Tennyson's reelection to a second term, Durham experienced its largest drop in crime since 1971, when the city began keeping computerized statistics. The drop followed a national trend.

Downtown Durham and public-private partnerships were a key focus for him. The redevelopment of the American Tobacco Campus was cited as a major reason to put a restricted fund in place using a 1 cent property tax set-aside for infrastructure improvements that helped American Tobacco and later used for Parrish Street projects.

== Later career ==
Tennyson served as the Executive Vice President of the Home Builders Association of Durham, Orange and Chatham Counties from 1995 until 2013, when he became a Chief Deputy Secretary of the North Carolina Department of Transportation. He became acting Secretary in 2015 upon the resignation of Tony Tata. Governor Pat McCrory appointed Tennyson to the Secretary's post permanently on August 6, 2015.

== Education, military service and family ==
He has a Bachelor of Arts degree from Duke University and Masters in Human Resources Management from Pepperdine University.

A veteran of the US Navy, Tennyson served as a commissioned officer on active duty from 1972 - 1977. After leaving active duty, he continued his service as a member of US Naval Reserve, ultimately retiring in 1996 as a Captain.

Tennyson is married to Jennifer and together they have three children; two sons and a daughter, all of whom were educated in Durham Public Schools.

Preceded by Sylvia Kerckhoff	Mayor of Durham, North Carolina; 1997 – 2001	Succeeded by Bill Bell
