= Eure, North Carolina =

- Unincorporated community
- Location within North Carolina
- Coordinates: 36°25′39″N 76°51′12″W
- Country: United States
- State: North Carolina
- County: Gates
- Incorporated: 1915 (inactive)
- Elevation: 23 ft (7.0 m)
- Time zone: UTC-5 (Eastern (EST))
  - Summer (DST): UTC-4 (EDT)
- ZIP code: 27935
- Area code: 252
- GNIS feature ID: 1025312

Eure is an unincorporated community in mid-western Gates County, North Carolina, United States. It lies at an elevation of 23 feet (7 m). It is approximately 15 minutes away from Merchants Millpond State Park, and about 40 minutes away from the Great Dismal Swamp.

Eure was incorporated in 1915, but later fell in active in municipal affairs. A volunteer fire department was established in 1980.
