= Buckland (Buckland, North Carolina) =

Historic house in North Carolina, United States

- U.S. National Register of Historic Places
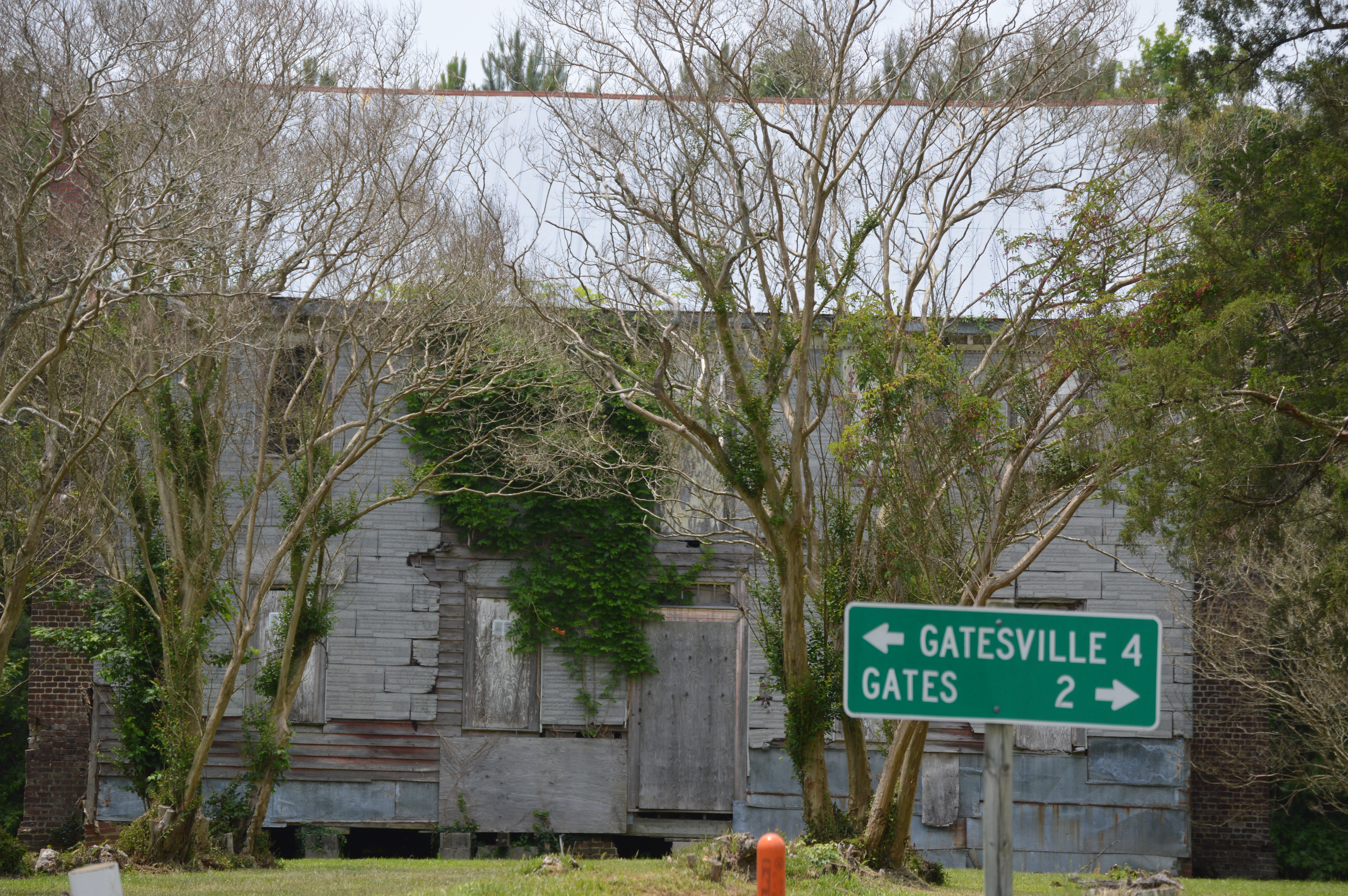
- Front

- Location within North Carolina Location within the United States
- Location: NC 37 at SR 1220, Buckland, North Carolina
- Coordinates: 36°28′31″N 76°45′46″W
- Area: 97 acres (39 ha)
- Built: 1795
- Architectural style: Georgian, Federal
- NRHP reference No.: 86000407
- Added to NRHP: March 5, 1986

Buckland is a historic plantation house located near Buckland, Gates County, North Carolina. It was built about 1795, and is a two-story, five-bay, transitional Georgian / Federal style frame dwelling with a double-pile center-hall plan. It has paired, double shouldered brick exterior end chimneys. The front facade features a handsome double-tier pedimented portico protecting the central three bays.

It was listed on the National Register of Historic Places in 1986.
