= Eason Crossroads, North Carolina =

- Unincorporated community
- Location within North Carolina Location within the United States
- Coordinates: 36°26′56″N 76°42′00″W
- Country: United States
- State: North Carolina
- County: Gates
- Elevation: 36 ft (11 m)
- Time zone: UTC-5 (Eastern (EST))
  - Summer (DST): UTC-4 (EDT)
- Area code: 252
- GNIS feature ID: 1020073

Eason Crossroads is an unincorporated community in Gates County, North Carolina, United States. Eason Crossroads is located on U.S. Route 158, 4.5 miles (7.2 km) northeast of Gatesville.
