= 1979 Durham mayoral election =

- November 6, 1979

Nominee	Harry E. Rodenhizer	Margaret Q. Keller
Party	Nonpartisan	Nonpartisan
Popular vote	9,641	8,399
Percentage	53.4%	46.6%
- Precinct results Rodenhizer: 50–60% 60–70% 70–80% 80–90% Keller: 50–60% 60–70% 80–90% ≥90% No votes
Mayor before election
Wade L. Cavin
Democratic
Elected mayor
Harry E. Rodenhizer
Republican

The 1979 Durham mayoral election was held on November 6, 1979 to elect the mayor of Durham, North Carolina. It saw the election of Harry E. Rodenhizer Jr., who unseated incumbent mayor Wade L. Cavin.

== Results ==
=== Primary ===
The date of the primary was October 9.

Primary results
Candidate	Votes	%
Margaret Q. Keller	6,201	34.18
Harry E. Rodenhizer Jr.	4,911	27.07
Wade L. Cavin (incumbent)	2,089	11.51
Mort Levi withdrawn	31	0.17
Total votes	18,143	

=== General election ===
General election results
Candidate	Votes	%
Harry E. Rodenhizer Jr.	9,641	53.44
Margaret Q. Keller	8,399	46.56
Total votes	18,040	
