= Holly Grove, Gates County, North Carolina =

Holly Grove, North Carolina
- Unincorporated community
- Location within North Carolina Location within the United States
- Coordinates: 36°30′20″N 76°34′08″W
- Country: United States
- State: North Carolina
- County: Gates
- Elevation: 39 ft (12 m)
- Time zone: UTC-5 (Eastern (EST))
  - Summer (DST): UTC-4 (EDT)
- Area code: 252
- GNIS feature ID: 986945

Holly Grove is an unincorporated community in Gates County, North Carolina, United States.
