= 2001 Durham mayoral election =

Durham mayoral election, 2001
- November 5, 2001
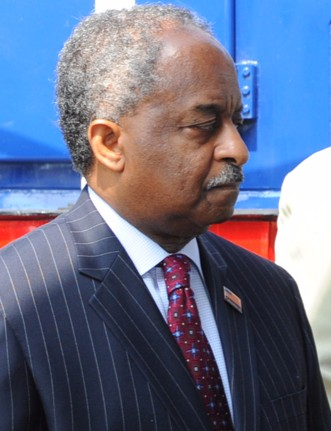

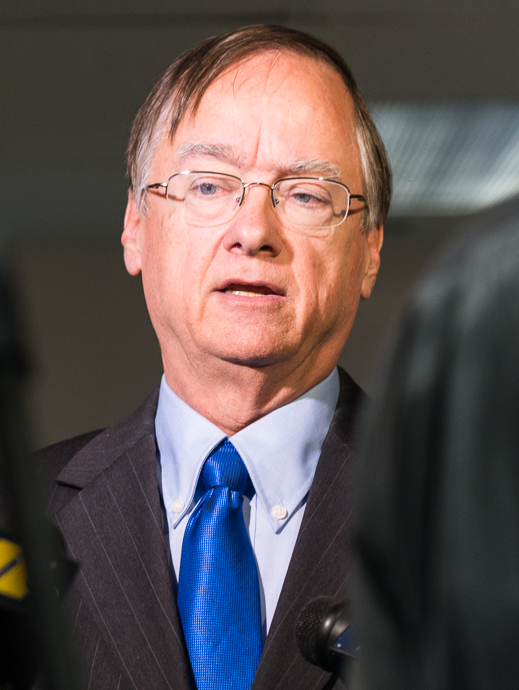
| Candidate | Bill Bell | Nick Tennyson |
| Party | Nonpartisan | Nonpartisan |
| Popular vote | 16,525 | 16,040 |
| Percentage | 50.56% | 49.07% |
Mayor before election
Nick Tennyson
Republican
Elected mayor
Bill Bell
Democratic

The 2001 Durham mayoral election was held on November 5, 2001, to elect the mayor of Durham, North Carolina. It saw the election of Bill Bell, who unseated incumbent mayor Nick Tennyson.

== Results ==
=== Primary ===
The date of the primary was October 9, 2001.

Primary results
| Candidate | Votes | % |
|---|---|---|
| Nick Tennyson (incumbent) | 7,927 | 51.97 |
| Bill Bell | 7,793 | 44.54 |
| Brenda B. Burnette | 289 | 1.89 |
| Ralph M. McKinney Jr. | 153 | 1.00 |
| Stephen Hopkins | 91 | 0.60 |

=== General election ===
General election results
| Candidate | Votes | % |
|---|---|---|
| Bill Bell | 16,525 | 50.56 |
| Nick Tennyson (incumbent) | 16,040 | 49.07 |
| Write ins | 121 | 0.37 |
| Total votes | 32,686 | |
