= 1944 North Carolina Secretary of State election =

- November 7, 1944
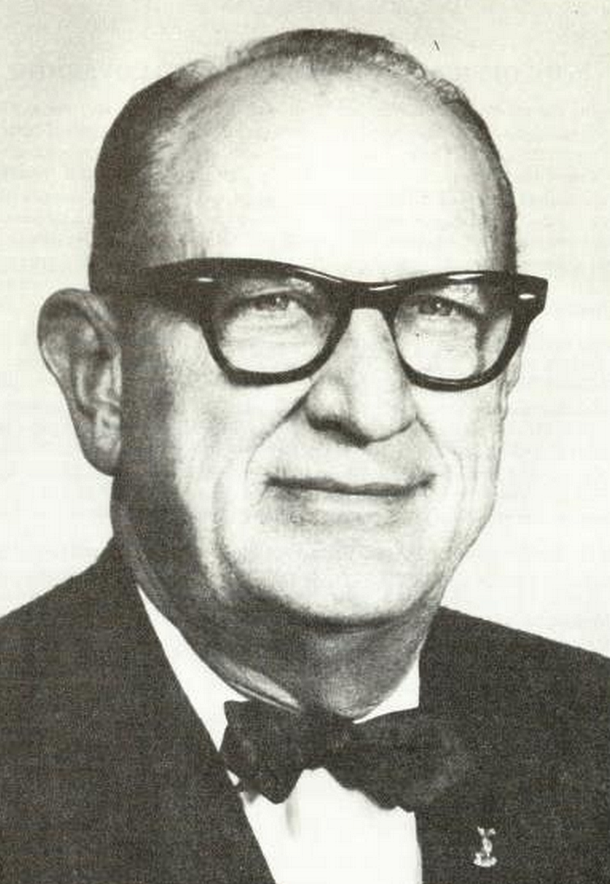

Nominee	Thad A. Eure	Watt Gragg
Party	Democratic	Republican
Popular vote	525,155	225,147
Percentage	69.99%	30.01%
Secretary of State of North Carolina before election
Thad A. Eure
Democratic
Elected Secretary of State of North Carolina
Thad A. Eure
Democratic

The North Carolina secretary of state election of 1944 took place on November 7, 1944. The incumbent Secretary of State, Thad A. Eure, chose to run for reelection and defeated Watt Gragg with 69.99% of the vote. Eure won his third of thirteen terms.

== Results ==
North Carolina Secretary of State election, 1940
Party	Candidate	Votes	%
Democratic	Thad A. Eure	525,155	69.99%
Republican	Watt Gragg	225,147	30.01%
Total votes		750,302	100%
