= 1983 Durham mayoral election =

Durham mayoral election, 1983
- November 8, 1983
Candidate	Charles Markham	Asa T. Spaulding Jr.
Party	nonpartisan candidate	Nonpartisan
Popular vote	10,618	9,268
Percentage	53.39%	46.61%
Mayor before election
Charles Markham
Elected mayor
Charles Markham

The 1983 Durham mayoral election was held on November 8, 1983, to elect the mayor of Durham, North Carolina. It saw the reelection of incumbent mayor Charles Markham

== Results ==
General election results
Candidate	Votes	%
Charles Markham (incumbent)	10,618	53.39
Asa T. Spaulding Jr.	9,268	46.61
Total votes	19,886	
