= 1991 Durham mayoral election =

Durham mayoral election, 1991
- November 5, 1991
Candidate	Harry E. Rodenhizer Jr.	Chester L. Jenkins
Party	nonpartisan candidate	Nonpartisan
Popular vote	15,725	13,640
Percentage	53.55%	46.45%
Mayor before election
Chester L. Jenkins
Democratic
Elected mayor
Harry E. Rodenhizer Jr.
Republican

The 1991 Durham mayoral election was held on November 5, 1991, to elect the mayor of Durham, North Carolina. It saw the return of past mayor Harry E. Rodenhizer Jr. to the office, as he unseated incumbent mayor Chester L. Jenkins.

== Results ==
=== Primary ===
The date of the primary was October 9.

Primary results
Candidate	Votes	%
Harry E. Rodenhizer Jr.	10,584	55.63
Chester L. Jenkins (incumbent)	7,380	38.79
C. Bernard Obie	817	4.29
Herb Franklin	245	1.29
Total votes	19,026	

=== General election ===
General election results
Candidate	Votes	%
Harry E. Rodenhizer Jr.	15,725	53.55
Chester L. Jenkins (incumbent)	13,640	46.45
Total votes	29,365	
