= Hoflers Fork, North Carolina =

- Unincorporated community
- Location within North Carolina Location within the United States
- Coordinates: 36°23′47″N 76°36′25″W
- Country: United States
- State: North Carolina
- County: Gates
- Elevation: 36 ft (11 m)
- Time zone: UTC-5 (Eastern (EST))
  - Summer (DST): UTC-4 (EDT)
- Area code: 252
- GNIS feature ID: 1025410

Hoflers Fork is an unincorporated community in Gates County, North Carolina, United States. Hoflers Fork is located on North Carolina Highway 32, 8.5 miles (13.7 km) east of Gatesville.
