= Frank Evers =

Frank Evers may refer to:

- Frank Evers (cartoonist) (1920–2002), editorial cartoonist
- Frank Evers (Gaelic footballer) (1934–2025), Gaelic footballer for the Galway county team in the 1950s and early 1960s
- Frank Evers (businessman) (born 1965), CEO of Institute for Artist Management
