= 2015 Durham mayoral election =

Durham mayoral election, 2015
- November 3, 2015
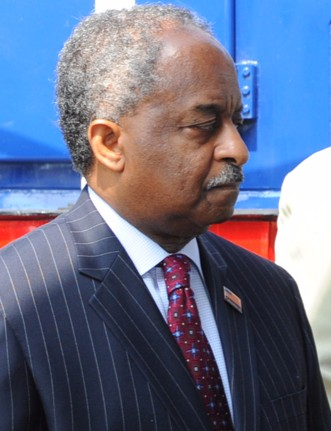

Candidate	Bill Bell	James Lyons
Party	Nonpartisan	Nonpartisan
Popular vote	16,296	2,422
Percentage	86.70%	12.89%
Mayor before election
Bill Bell
Democratic
Elected mayor
Bill Bell
Democratic

The 2015 Durham mayoral election was held on November 3, 2015, to elect the mayor of Durham, North Carolina. It saw the reelection of incumbent mayor Bill Bell.

== Results ==
=== Primary ===
The date of the primary was October 6, 2015.

Primary results
Candidate	Votes	%
Bill Bell (incumbent)	11,415	86.40
James Lyons	1,072	8.11
Tammy Lightfoot	401	3.04
John Everett	324	2.45
Total votes	13,212	

=== General election ===
General election results
Candidate	Votes	%
Bill Bell (incumbent)	16,296	86.70
James Lyons	2,422	12.89
Write-in	78	0.41
Total votes	18,796	
