= 2017 Durham mayoral election =

Durham mayoral election, 2017
- November 7, 2017
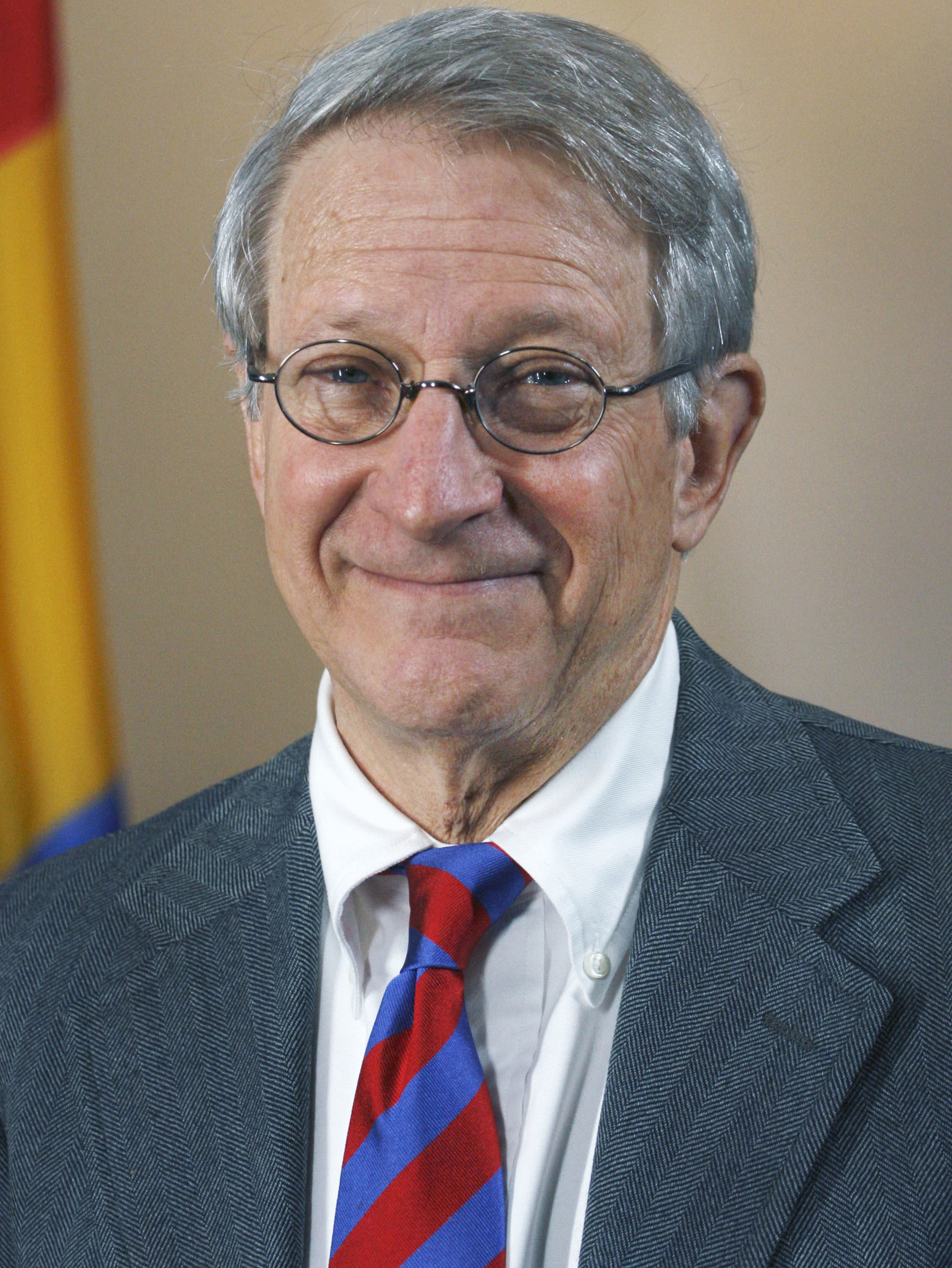

Candidate	Steve Schewel	Farad Ali
Party	Nonpartisan	Nonpartisan
Popular vote	21,362	14,451
Percentage	59.45%	40.22%
Mayor before election
Bill Bell
Democratic
Elected mayor
Steve Schewel
Democratic

The 2017 Durham mayoral election was held on November 7, 2017, to elect the mayor of Durham, North Carolina. It saw the election of Steve Schewel.

== Results ==
=== Primary ===
The date of the primary was October 10, 2017.

Primary results
Candidate	Votes	%
Steve Schewel	12,998	51.04
Farard Ali	7,421	29.14
Pierce Feelon	4,059	15.94
Sylvester Williams	338	1.33
Shea Ramirez	296	1.16
Tracy D. Drinker	251	0.99
Michael Johnson	0.40	1.16

=== General election ===
General election results
Candidate	Votes	%
Steve Schewel	21,362	59.45
Farad Ali	14,451	40.22
Pierce Freelon (write-in)	40	0.11
Sylvester Williams (write-in)	8	0.02
Chelli Monroe (write-in)	5	0.01
Other write-ins	68	0.19
Total votes	35,934	
