= 1993 Durham mayoral election =

Durham mayoral election, 1993
- November 2, 1993
| Candidate | Sylvia Kerckhoff | Harry E. Rodenhizer Jr. |
| Party | nonpartisan candidate | Nonpartisan |
| Popular vote | 14,616 | 9,641 |
| Percentage | 60.14% | 39.67% |
Mayor before election
Harry E. Rodenhizer Jr.
Republican
Elected mayor
Sylvia Kerckhoff

The 1993 Durham mayoral election was held on November 2, 1993, to elect the mayor of Durham, North Carolina. It saw the election of Sylvia Kerckhoff, who unseated incumbent mayor Harry E. Rodenhizer Jr. Kerckhoff became the city's first female mayor.

== Results ==
=== General election ===
General election results
| Candidate | Votes | % |
|---|---|---|
| Sylvia Kerckhoff | 14,616 | 60.14 |
| Harry E. Rodenhizer Jr. (incumbent) | 9,641 | 39.67 |
| Write-in | 46 | 0.18 |
| Total votes | 24,303 | |
