= 2005 Durham mayoral election =

Durham mayoral election, 2005
- November 8, 2005
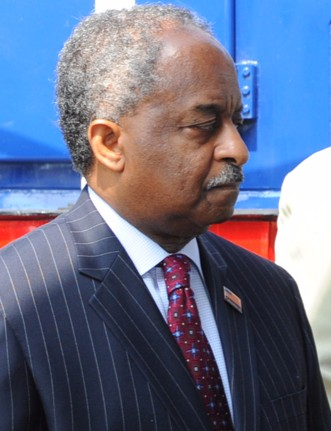

Candidate	Bill Bell	Jonathan Alston
Party	Nonpartisan	Nonpartisan
Popular vote	18,171	3,007
Percentage	84.98%	14.06%
Mayor before election
Bill Bell
Democratic
Elected mayor
Bill Bell
Democratic

The 2005 Durham mayoral election was held on November 8, 2005, to elect the mayor of Durham, North Carolina. It saw the reelection of incumbent mayor Bill Bell.

== Results ==
=== Primary ===
The date of the primary was October 11, 2005.

Candidate Vincent Brown formally withdrew before the election, thus no votes were counted for him.

Primary election results
Candidate	Votes	%
Bill Bell (incumbent)	11,333	88.00
Jonathan Alston	787	6.11
Jacqueline D. Wagstaff	567	4.40
Total votes	12,687	

=== General election ===
General election results
Candidate	Votes	%
Bill Bell (incumbent)	18,171	84.98
Jonathan Alston	3,007	14.06
Write-in	205	0.96
Total votes	21,383	
