= Brenny Evers =

Dutch footballer

Personal information
- Full name: Brenny Evers
- Date of birth: 8 November 1978 (age 47)
- Place of birth: Veghel, Netherlands
- Height: 1.76 m (5 ft 9 in)
- Position: Defender

Youth career
- PSV

Senior career*
Years	Team	Apps	(Gls)
1999–2000	Fortuna Sittard	16	(0)
2000–2001	Helmond Sport	21	(1)
2001–2005	KFC Uerdingen	118	(1)
2005–2008	TuS Koblenz	66	(0)
2008–2011	MVV	90	(1)
2011–2012	EVV		

International career
1994	Netherlands U-16	1	(0)
1994–1995	Netherlands U-17	4	(0)
- * Club domestic league appearances and goals

Brenny Evers (born 8 November 1978) is a Dutch former professional footballer who played as a defender.

== Club career ==
Born in Veghel, Evers came through the youth system of PSV Eindhoven. He was picked up by Fortuna Sittard after two seasons in PSV's reserve team, and made his first-team debut on 20 November 1999 against De Graafschap in the Eredivisie. He was signed by Helmond Sport in summer 2000, making his debut in a 2–1 loss to Telstar in the second-tier Eerste Divisie on 25 September 2000.

He signed for German Regionalliga Nord side KFC Uerdingen 05, managed by compatriot Jos Luhukay, in 2001. He played in Germany between 2001 and 2008, also playing for TuS Koblenz from 2005 to 2008. Evers signed with MVV from the Dutch second division in 2008.

== International career ==
Evers played one game for the Netherlands U-16 team in 1994 and four matches for the Netherlands U-17 in 1994 and 1995.
