= Charles Markham (American politician) =

American politician

- In office 1981–1985
- Preceded by: Harry E. Rodenhizer Jr.
- Succeeded by: Wib Gulley

Personal details
- Born: September 15, 1926 Durham, North Carolina, U.S.
- Died: March 22, 2010 (aged 83)

Charles Buchanan Markham (September 15, 1926; Durham, North Carolina – March 22, 2010) was an American politician from North Carolina. He served as the mayor of Durham from 1981 until 1985.

== See also ==
- 1981 Durham mayoral election
- 1983 Durham mayoral election
