= Randy Ewers =

American politician

Mayor Randy Ewers

Member of the Florida House of Representatives from Florida

Personal details
- Spouse: Lorrie Ewers
- Profession: Engineer

Randy Ewers (born 1968) is an American politician. He was the Mayor of Ocala, Florida, elected in December 2005. He served four terms as Mayor before standing down in 2011. By trade Ewers is an industrial engineer, and he is certified as Class 1 status.

== Education ==
- Ewers is a graduate of the University of Florida, and his major was in Industrial Engineering.

Preceded by Gerald Ergle	List of mayors of Ocala, Florida; 2005–2011	Succeeded by Kent Guinn
