= Merchants Millpond State Park =

State park in North Carolina, United States

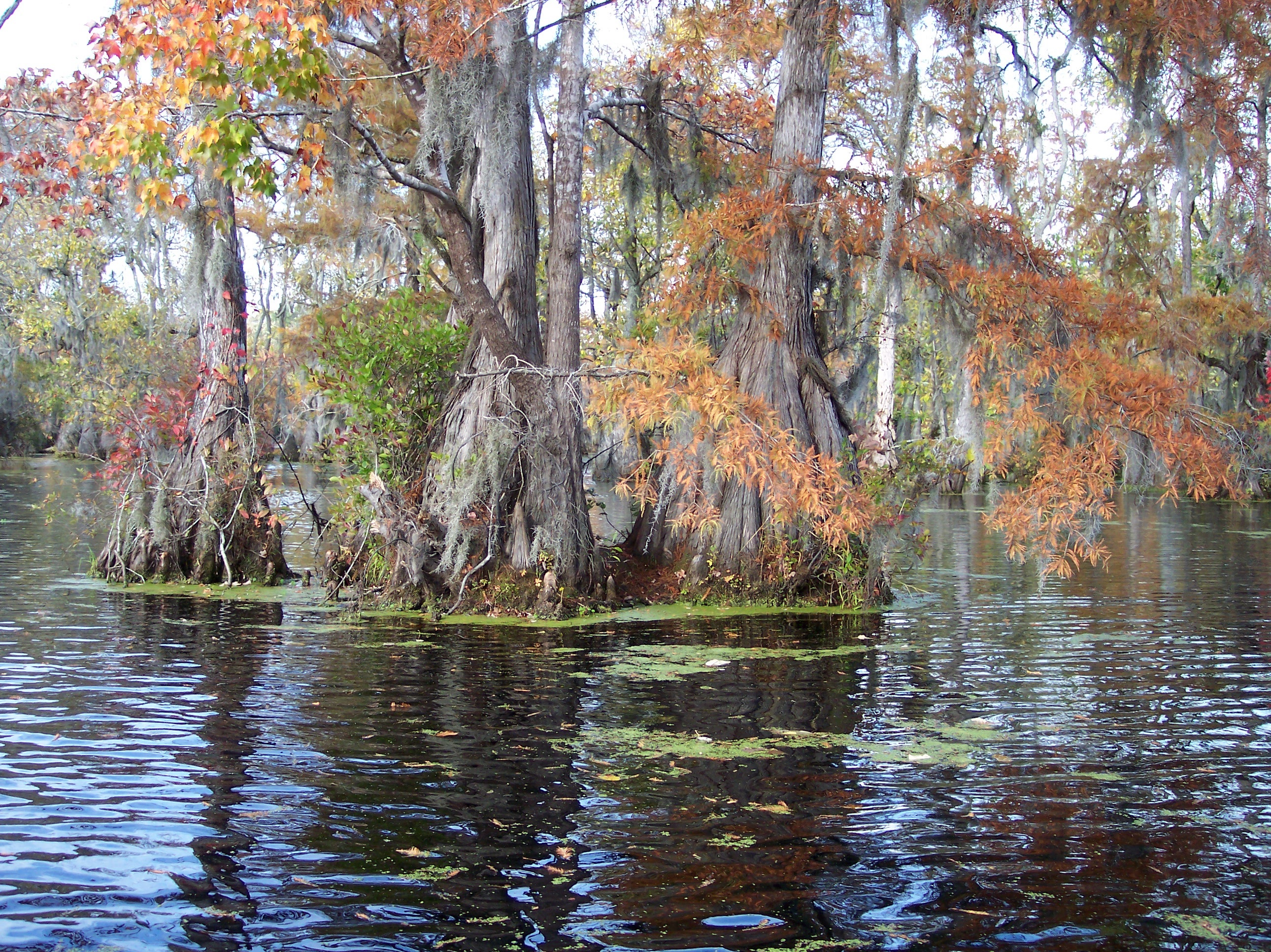

- Location within North Carolina Location within the United States
- Interactive map of Merchants Millpond State Park
- Location: Gates County, North Carolina, United States
- Coordinates: 36°26′14″N 76°42′06″W
- Area: 3,520 acres (1,420 ha)
- Elevation: 36 ft (11 m)
- Established: 1973
- Administrator: North Carolina Division of Parks and Recreation
- Website: Official website

Merchants Millpond State Park is a North Carolina state park in Gates County, North Carolina, in the United States. Located near Gatesville, in North Carolina's coastal plain, it covers 3,520 acres (14.2 km^{2}) around a 200-year-old, 700-acre (280 ha) millpond and Lassiter Swamp. Canoeing is one of the park's major attractions. Alligators live in its large cypress swamps.

== History ==
Settlement in the Gates County area began in 1660. Residents of early rural communities made a living by farming and lumbering. In the early 18th century, Hunters Millpond was built at the head of Bennetts Creek to provide a means of processing and marketing regional produce. Highway construction destroyed this millpond in 1922. But further downstream, Norfleets Millpond, which was built in 1811, thrived. Gristmills, a sawmill, a farm supply store and other enterprises made the area the center of trade in Gates County. Thus, the pond became known as Merchants Millpond.

Shortly before World War II operations around the millpond came to a halt and millers sold the land to developers. In the 1960s, A.B. Coleman from Moyock, North Carolina purchased the property and later donated 919 acres (3.72 km^{2}), including the millpond, to the state. His generous donation led to the establishment of Merchants Millpond State Park in 1973. In the same year, the Nature Conservancy contributed an additional 925 acres (3.74 km^{2}) of woodlands to the park that now encompasses more than 3,250 acres (13.2 km^{2}).
