= Bill Bell (mayor) =

American politician

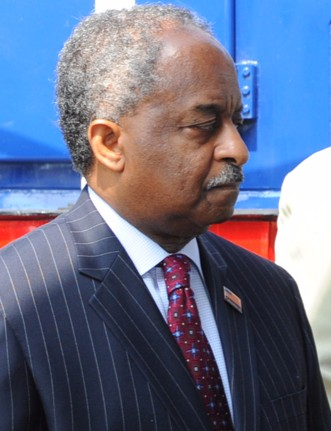

Mayor of Durham, North Carolina
- In office 2001–2017
- Preceded by: Nick Tennyson
- Succeeded by: Steve Schewel

Personal details
- Born: William V. Bell; 1941 (unconfirmed) Washington, D.C., U.S.
- Party: Democratic
- Spouse: Judith C. Bell
- Children: William V. Bell II; Tiffany Anne Bell; Anjanee Nicole Bell; Kristen Vaughn Bell
- Education: Howard University, New York University
- Profession: electrical engineer

William V. Bell is an American politician and engineer who served as the mayor of Durham, North Carolina.

Formerly a senior engineer for IBM, Bell was first elected to the Durham County Board of Commissioners in 1972, where he served until 1994, and again from 1996 to 2000. He was the chairman of the Durham County Commissioners from 1982 to 1994. Bell was first elected mayor of Durham in 2001 and was subsequently re-elected seven more times.

Bell is currently Executive Vice President and Chief Operating Officer of UDI Community Development Corp., a non-profit organization. He is a member of the Mayors Against Illegal Guns Coalition, a bi-partisan group with a stated goal of "making the public safer by getting illegal guns off the streets." The Coalition was co-founded by Boston Mayor Thomas Menino and New York City Mayor Michael Bloomberg.

== 2007 Mayor Re-election Campaign ==
In 2007, Bell was challenged by Republican Thomas Stith, III. Thomas Stith attacked Bell over several city issues including violence. During the weekend of October 13 and October 14, two people were murdered in Durham. On October 15, Bell tried to calm the public about the murders, claiming the city was safe and the weekend murders were not random. The next day, Stith went after Bell, pointing out that Durham's murder rate was up nearly 50 percent over the previous year. Stith and Bell continued to argue over how to deal with Durham crime. Stith consistently claimed that he would fight crime more consistently than Bell had, while Bell said that Stith had six years on the town council to do that. Stith said he wanted to see more police officers on the streets, while Bill Bell said the current police officers are well equipped.

In late October 2007, after lead was found in Durham drinking water, Stith sent out a campaign mailer that said in bold letters: "Bill Bell knew and didn't tell us our water was dangerous to drink." Bell responded to this by saying, "That mailer sent out by Thomas Stith was a complete lie." Bell also said that Stith had no leadership experience.

Bell was re-elected in the November 6, 2007 election, getting 58% of the vote as opposed to Stith's 42%.

== Controversy ==
It was later revealed that Bell endorsed and donated money to now-disgraced, former district attorney Mike Nifong during his reelection campaign surrounding the 2006 Duke University lacrosse case.

== See also ==
- 2001 Durham mayoral election
- 2003 Durham mayoral election
- 2005 Durham mayoral election
- 2007 Durham mayoral election
- 2009 Durham mayoral election
- 2013 Durham mayoral election
- 2011 Durham mayoral election
- 2015 Durham mayoral election

Preceded by Nick Tennyson	Mayor of Durham, North Carolina; 2001 – December 4, 2017	Succeeded by Steve Schewel
