= Frank Evers (cartoonist) =

American cartoonist

Francis Joseph Evers (12 June 1920 – 24 October 2002) was an American cartoonist known for his editorial cartoons. Evers worked in comic books and magazine cartooning before establishing himself doing sports and editorial cartoons for newspapers. He provided editorial cartoons for Jersey Journal, Hudson Dispatch, and the New York Daily News. He received the National Cartoonists Society Editorial Cartoon Award for 1979, and was president of that society from 1985 to 1987.

Evers was born in New York City and served in the U.S. Coast Guard during World War II. He died in Brick, New Jersey, aged 82.
