= 2013 Durham mayoral election =

Durham mayoral election, 2013
- November 5, 2013
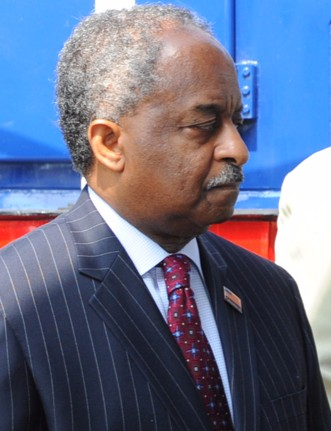

Candidate	Bill Bell	Sylvester Williams
Party	Nonpartisan	Nonpartisan
Popular vote	15,595	2,378
Percentage	86.43%	13.18%
Mayor before election
Bill Bell
Democratic
Elected mayor
Bill Bell
Democratic

The 2013 Durham mayoral election was held on November 5, 2013, to elect the mayor of Durham, North Carolina. It saw the reelection of incumbent mayor Bill Bell.

== Results ==
=== Primary ===
The date of the primary was October 8, 2013.

Primary results
Candidate	Votes	%
Bill Bell (incumbent)	9,079	87.06
Sylvester Williams	762	7.31
Michael Valentine	588	5.64
Total votes	10,429	

=== General election ===
General election results
Candidate	Votes	%
Bill Bell (incumbent)	15,595	86.43
Sylvester Williams	2,378	13.18
Write-in	70	0.39
Total votes	8,043	
