= Pizza Palace =

Pizzeria in Knoxville, Tennessee, U.S.

- Interactive map of Pizza Palace

Restaurant information
- Location: 3132 East Magnolia Avenue, Knoxville, Tennessee, 37914, United States
- Coordinates: 35°59′42″N 83°53′09″W

Pizza Palace is a pizzeria in Knoxville, Tennessee. It opened on August 10, 1961, and has been featured on the Food Network series Diners, Drive-Ins and Dives.

== See also ==
- List of Diners, Drive-Ins and Dives episodes
