= Gates County, North Carolina =

County in North Carolina, United States

- County
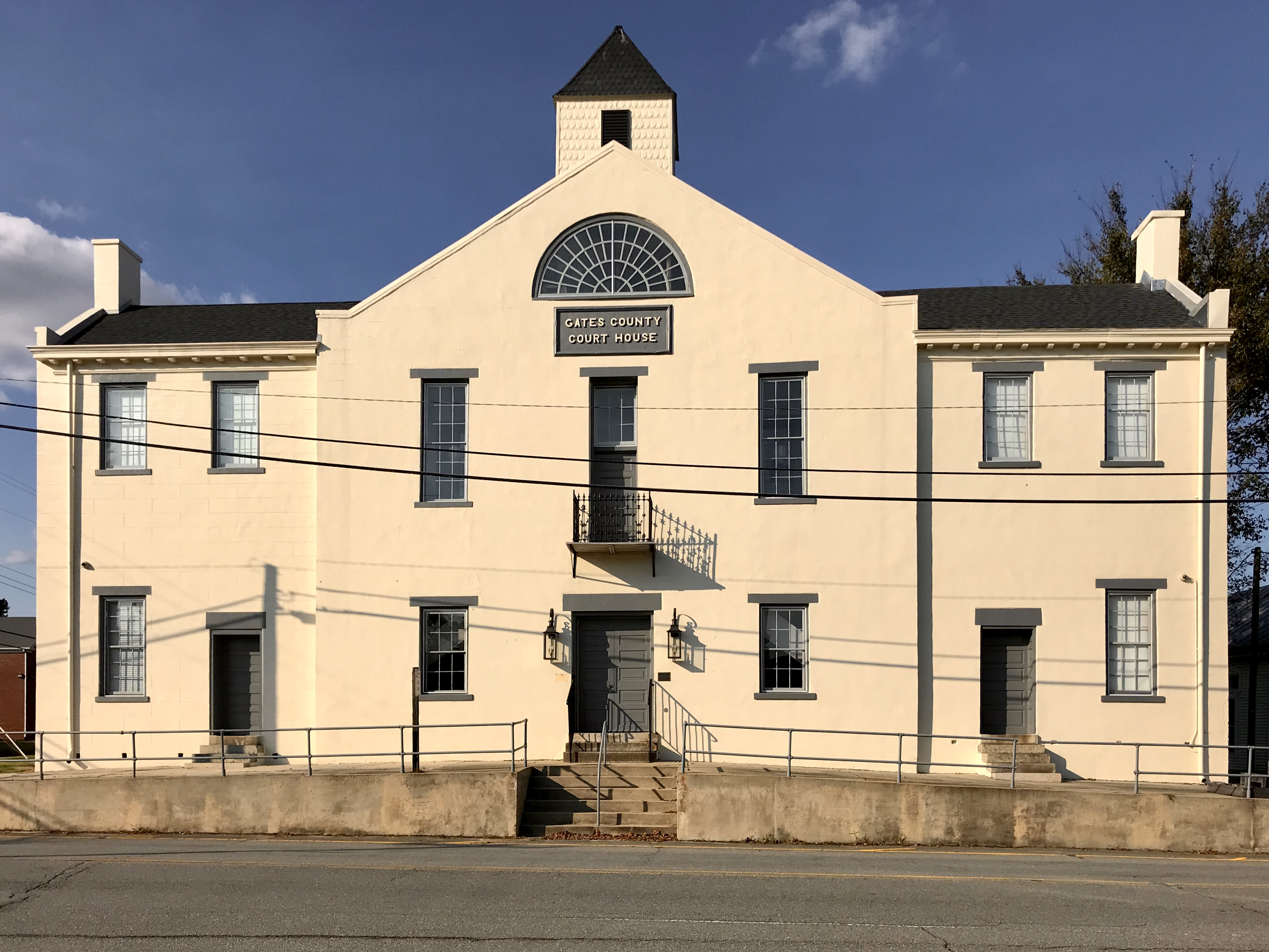
- Old Gates County Courthouse in Gatesville

- Flag Seal

- Location within the U.S. state of North Carolina
- Interactive map of Gates County, North Carolina
- Coordinates: 36.44°N 76.70°W
- Country: United States
- State: North Carolina
- Founded: 1779
- Named for: General Horatio Gates
- Seat: Gatesville
- Largest community: Gatesville

Area
  - Total: 345.74 sq mi (895.5 km^{2})
  - Land: 340.61 sq mi (882.2 km^{2})
  - Water: 5.13 sq mi (13.3 km^{2}) 1.48%

Population (2020)
  - Total: 10,478
  - Estimate (2025): 10,234 ▼
  - Density: 31.56/sq mi (12.19/km^{2})
- Time zone: UTC−5 (Eastern)
  - Summer (DST): UTC−4 (EDT)
- Congressional district: 1st
- Website: gatescountync.gov

Gates County is a county located in the northeastern portion of the U.S. state of North Carolina, on the border with Virginia. As of the 2020 census, the population was 10,478, making it the fifth-least populous county in North Carolina. Its county seat is Gatesville. Gates County is included in the Virginia Beach-Chesapeake, VA-NC Combined Statistical Area. It is part of the Albemarle Sound area of the Inner Banks.

== History ==
=== Early history ===
As in other areas along the waterways, Indigenous peoples of the Americas lived in this region for thousands of years, with different groups leaving and new ones migrating to settle again. They created settlements, increasingly permanent, along the Chowan River.

At the time of European contact, the Chowanoke were the largest tribe in North Carolina of the many in the Algonquian language family and it occupied most of the territory along the river. After suffering dramatic population decreases by the early 17th century due to infectious diseases from Europe, which they had no immunity to, most of the survivors were pushed out by encroaching Tuscarora, an Iroquoian-speaking tribe.

In 1585, the Ralph Lane Colony explored the Chowan River at least as far up as present-day Winton. In 1622, the John Pory Colony led an expedition from Virginia to the Chowan River. (Pory was secretary of the Province of Virginia.) In 1629, Sir Robert Heath was granted a patent to settle Carolina. This patent embraced Gates County.

The Chowanoke waged war against the encroaching colonists in 1644 but they ultimately lost. During the 1650s, colonists from Virginia began to move increasingly into the Albemarle Sound region. Colonel Drew and Roger Green led an expedition into the Albemarle area. In 1654, Francis Speight was granted a patent for 300 acres (1.2 km^{2}) of land near Raynor Swamp. The first English settlement in Gates County was established near Corapeake in 1660. In 1670, Colonel Henry Baker of Nansemond County obtained a grant of land for 2,400 acres (9.7 km^{2}) near Buckland.

The Chowanoke renewed their effort to expel the colonists, warring from 1675 to 1677. Following the English defeat of these forces, in 1677 they created a Chowanoke Indian Reservation, the first within the present-day United States. The 11,360-acre reservation was established at the Chowanoke settlement between Bennett's Creek and Catherine Creek in Gates.

From 1684 to 1722 Gates County was a part of the Chowan precinct. In 1711, the Society for the Propagation of the Gospel established an Anglican school for Chowanoke and other local Indians at Sarum, with a Mr. Mashburn as the teacher. During the 18th century, the Chowanoke lost most of their land, selling off portions to help the tribe survive. Men's names were recorded in tribal conveyances, and many descendants can trace their ancestry to these families. Some members began to intermarry with other tribes, such as the nearby Meherrin people, as well as Englishmen and Africans.

In 1738, local settlers created a mail route from Suffolk, Virginia to Corapeake, North Carolina and Edenton, North Carolina. The stagecoach route crossed the Chowan River at Barfield.

Gates County was organized in 1779 from parts of Chowan, Hertford, and Perquimans counties. It was named for General Horatio Gates, who had commanded the victorious American colonial forces at the Battle of Saratoga in 1777.

=== 1800s ===
In 1806, white settlers established Middle Swamp Baptist Church as the first Baptist church in Gates County. This accompanied the Second Great Awakening revival in the South after the American Revolution, which was led by Baptist and Methodist preachers. In 1811, Savages United Methodist Church was established, the oldest Methodist Church in Gates County. Both denominations preached both to enslaved blacks as well as white residents, and they accepted slaves and free blacks as members and sometimes even as preachers.

The Chowanoke Indians lost their last 30-acre plot of communal land in 1821. Although Gates County residents were mostly yeomen farmers who owned few slaves, the South overall still had a slave society which classified people as either black or white. However, the Native Americans managed to maintain their culture and absorbed people of other races in their matrilineal kinship systems. The Chowanoke were increasingly classified as free people of color, as where free blacks and mulattos. In the antebellum, Gates County—like several other North Carolina border counties—also became to home to a substantial number of free blacks who sought better treatment in North Carolina than in other states, with 361 recorded in the 1860 census.

In 1825, the Marquis de Lafayette travelled through Gates County and was entertained at Pipkin's Inn. The town of Gatesville was incorporated in 1830. The old courthouse was built in 1836. Its oldest remaining component is its Federal-style bell, which the town had purchased in 1781.

According to the 1850 census, only 15 of the county's 717 farms produced cotton. In 1851, the Reynoldson Academy was established. Free people of color, who were often of mixed race, organized New Hope Baptist Church in 1859.

=== Port of Hamburg ===
County residents worked to develop better connections to major ports. From 1805 to 1822, they excavated the White Oak Marsh Canal or Hamburg Ditch (now known as Cross Canal), about three miles (4.8 km) south of the Virginia line. It was Gates County's water route to the major port of Norfolk, running straight east for ten miles (16 km) through the Dismal Swamp, from a landing on Daniels Road in Gates County to the Dismal Swamp Canal that led to Norfolk.

The Cross Canal is no longer a through route, as it was blocked by hurricanes that toppled trees and blocked access. Until the late 20th century, sportsmen in small boats used the Gates County end, at the site of the town of Hamburg, to enter the swamp.

=== Civil War and Reconstruction ===
Prior to the American Civil War, most of Gates County was covered with virgin timber. In 1861, A. J. Walton was chosen as Gates County's representative to the North Carolina secession convention. After North Carolina voted to secede, the "Gates Guard" company was formed raised to protect its borders. It was soon joined by a second company, the "Gates Minutemen". However, Gates County's greatest contribution was in supplying food to the Confederate States Army. General William P. Roberts would become the youngest general. Brigadier General Laurence S. Baker, another Gates County native, lost his right arm in the war.

Jack Fairless of Gates County was dishonorably discharged from the Confederate army for stealing. He returned home and formed an outlaw band known as the "Buffaloes". Made up of draft dodgers, Confederate deserters, and renegades from both armies, Fairless's Buffaloes terrorized the old men, women, children who were trying to keep their farms going. Fairless was finally killed by his own men when they turned on him.

Fort Dillard was a Confederate post in Gates County, though the county was sometimes subject to Union raids. The story of the "Ellis Girls" is told even today. While fishing in the Chowan River, the sisters saw a Union gunboat on its way upriver to attack Winton. Union soldiers from the gunboat seized the girls and kept them prisoner on until they had finished burning down the town.

In 1878, Jethro Goodman introduced peanuts into Gates County. Thad Eure, a Secretary of State, was born here in 1899.

=== 1900s ===
On May 9, 1925, the first bridge opened across the Chowan River between Gates and Hertford counties. In 1925, U.S. Route 158 opened between Gates and Pasquotank counties, constructed through the Great Dismal Swamp.

In the 1930s Gates County still had no paved roads and few people owned automobiles. Most families grew their own produce and some raised livestock. In 1935 during the Great Depression, the Sunbury Ruritan Club was established, the first and oldest Ruritan chapter in the state. The civic organization of men was active in improving the town: "in its first three months..., the Sunbury Ruritan Club sponsored a Community Agriculture Fair; contacted NC DOT to place a stop signal at the Edenton-to-Suffolk Road; purchased school books for needy children; paid one-half the cost of new shades for the school; had the school piano tuned; and later made a contribution to the school's basketball team and sponsored a move to hire a police officer to serve the community."

Beckford Junction was a train switch in the city that enabled trains to go to Suffolk, Elizabeth City, or Edenton. Beckford Junction was abandoned in 1940. The last passenger train serving Gates County ended service in 1954. That year the Gates County Historical Society was established.

In 1973 A.B. Coleman donated 925 acres (3.74 km^{2}) of land in the Millpond to the state. This was the basis of the Merchants Millpond State Park.

In 1984 a tornado struck Gates County, killing two people and causing an estimated $500,000 to $5,000,000 worth of damage. Hurricane Floyd hit Gates County in 1999.

=== 2000s ===
In September 2007 Gates County was chosen as a potential site for a US Navy landing field in the northeastern part of the state.

In 2014 Delois Chavis, a Chowanoke descendant, worked with other Chowanoke to buy 146 acres of the tribe's former reservation land near Bennett's Creek. She had grown up knowing of her Native American identity from her parents and grandparents, and is among those who want to revive the tribe. They have organized as the Chowanoke Indian Tribe, and plan to build a cultural center on the land to help their efforts.

== Geography ==
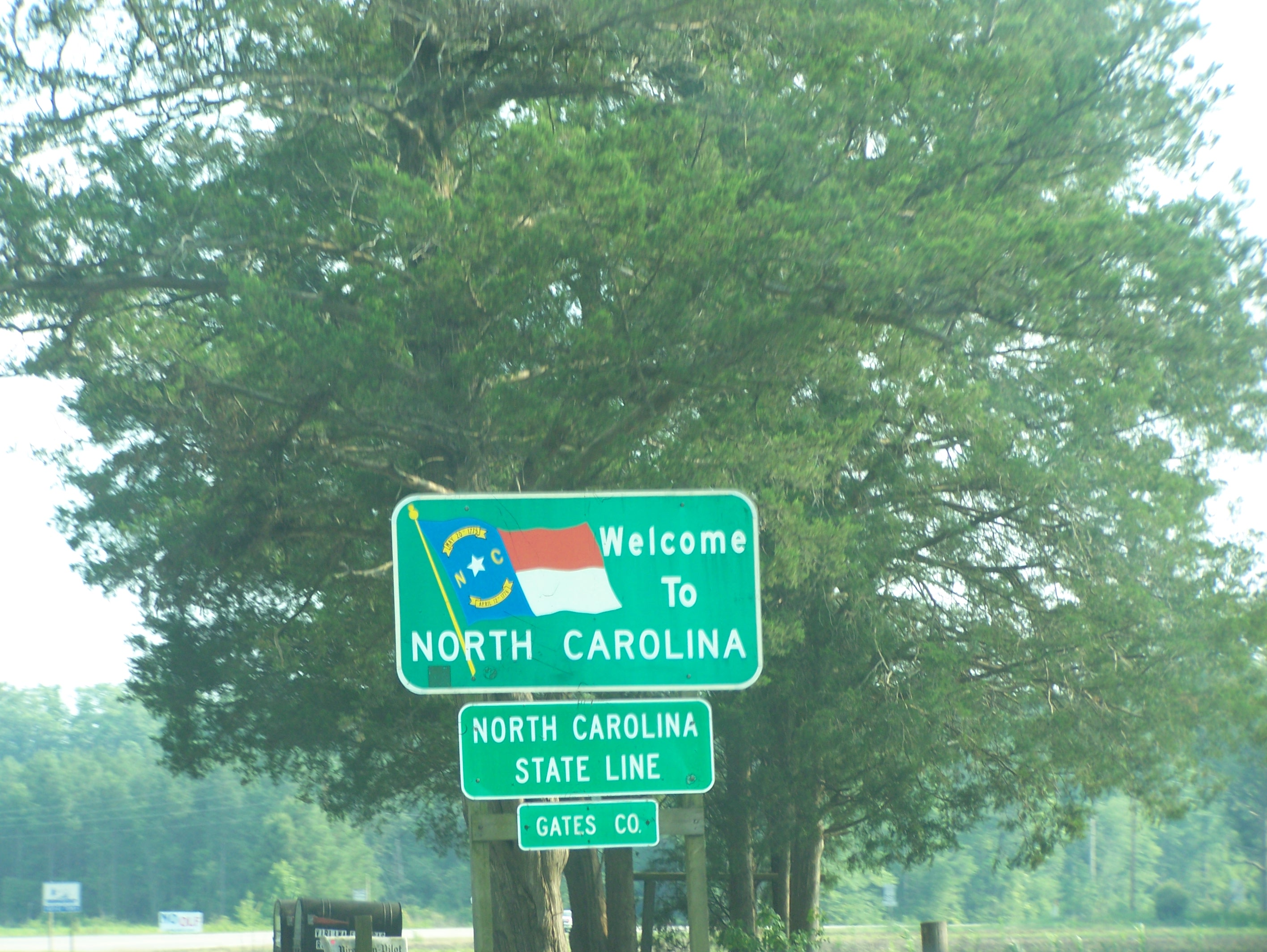
A welcome sign at the NC state line on US 13

According to the U.S. Census Bureau, the county has a total area of 345.75 square miles (895.5 km^{2}), of which 340.61 square miles (882.2 km^{2}) is land and 5.13 square miles (13.3 km^{2}) (1.48%) is water.

=== National protected area ===
==== Great Dismal Swamp ====
The counties of Gates, Perquimans, Camden and Currituck contain sixty percent of the Great Dismal swamp. In 1973, Union Camp donated the land which it owned in the swamp to the Nature Conservancy. The Conservancy next donated the land to the Department of The Interior, and the Great Dismal Swamp National Wildlife Refuge was created. The refuge consists of 107,000 acres (430 km^{2}) of swamp and wetlands surrounding Lake Drummond.

=== State and local protected area ===
- Chowan Swamp Game Land (part)
- Chowan Swamp State Natural Area
- Merchants Millpond State Park

In 1811, the Norfleet family built the first dam at the millpond. At that time, it consisted of around 750 to 1,000 acres (4.0 km^{2}) of water. The mill ground corn. In 1856 the Millpond was sold and became known as Williams Millpond.

In 1910, Charles Lawrence purchased the Millpond. It became known as Merchants Millpond. In the 1960s A. B. Coleman purchased the Millpond. In 1973, A.B. Coleman donated 925 acres (3.74 km^{2}) of the land to North Carolina under the condition that it was to become a state park. Today Merchants Millpond occupies 3,200 acres (13 km^{2}).

=== Major water body ===
- Chowan River

=== Adjacent counties ===
- City of Suffolk, Virginia – north
- Camden County – northeast
- Pasquotank County – east
- Perquimans County – south
- Chowan County – south
- Hertford County – west
- Southampton County, Virginia – northwest

=== Major highways ===
- US 13
- US 158
- US 158 Bus.
- NC 32
- NC 37
- NC 137

== Demographics ==
Historical population
Census	Pop.	Note	%±
1790	5,386		—
1800	5,881		9.2%
1810	5,965		1.4%
1820	6,837		14.6%
1830	7,866		15.1%
1840	8,161		3.8%
1850	8,426		3.2%
1860	8,443		0.2%
1870	7,724		−8.5%
1880	8,897		15.2%
1890	10,252		15.2%
1900	10,413		1.6%
1910	10,455		0.4%
1920	10,537		0.8%
1930	10,551		0.1%
1940	10,060		−4.7%
1950	9,555		−5.0%
1960	9,254		−3.2%
1970	8,524		−7.9%
1980	8,875		4.1%
1990	9,305		4.8%
2000	10,516		13.0%
2010	12,197		16.0%
2020	10,478		−14.1%
2025 (est.)	10,234	▼	−2.3%
U.S. Decennial Census; 1790–1960 1900–1990; 1990–2000 2010 2020

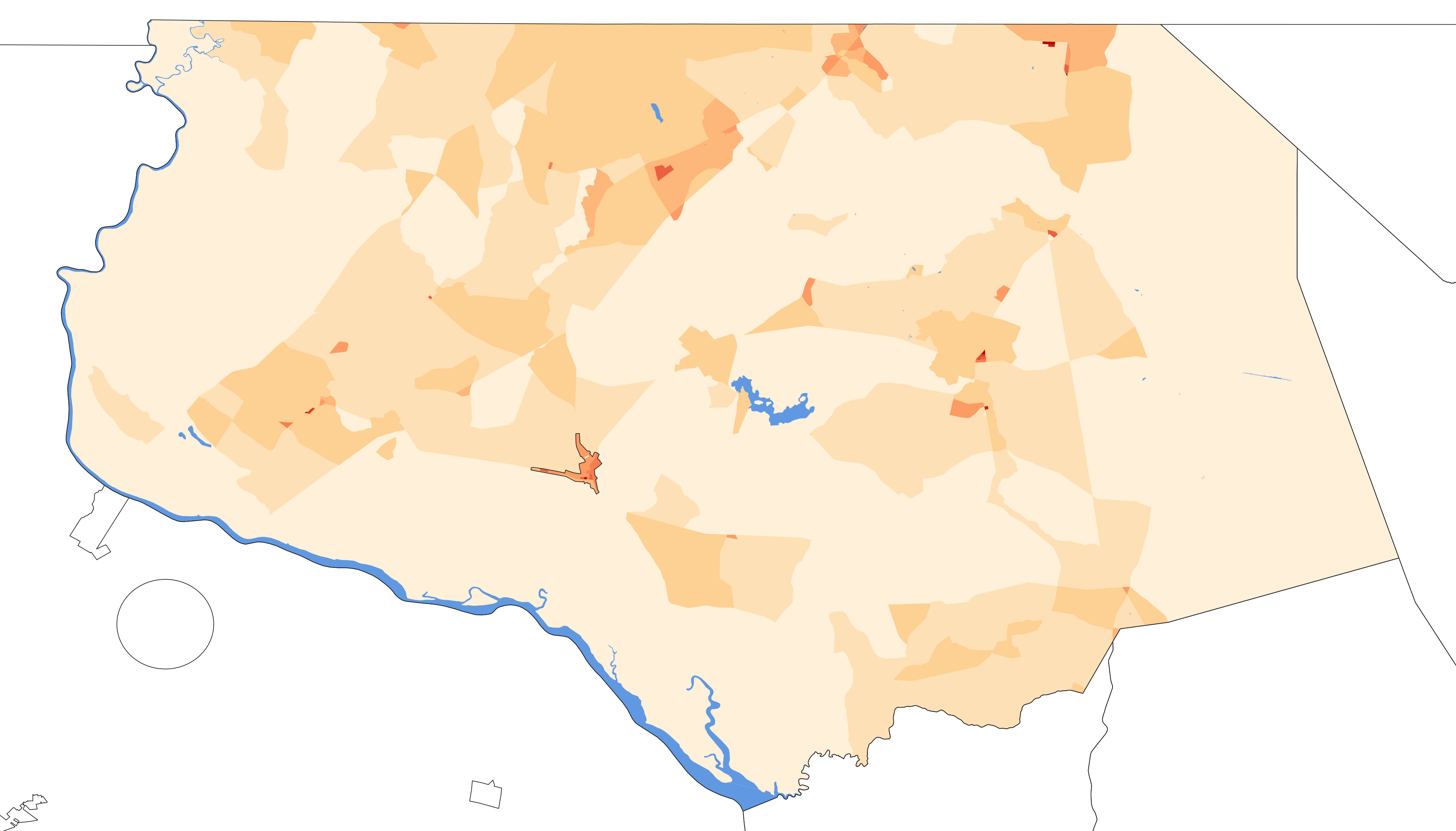
2020 population density of Gates County NC by census block

=== Racial and ethnic composition ===
Gates County, North Carolina – Racial and ethnic composition Note: the US Census treats Hispanic/Latino as an ethnic category. This table excludes Latinos from the racial categories and assigns them to a separate category. Hispanics/Latinos may be of any race.
Race / Ethnicity (NH = Non-Hispanic)	Pop 1980	Pop 1990	Pop 2000	Pop 2010	Pop 2020	% 1980	% 1990	% 2000	% 2010	% 2020
White alone (NH)	4,184	5,087	6,154	7,684	6,705	47.14%	54.67%	58.52%	63.00%	63.99%
Black or African American alone (NH)	4,599	4,176	4,113	4,040	3,022	51.82%	44.88%	39.11%	33.12%	28.84%
Native American or Alaska Native alone (NH)	4	8	41	62	64	0.05%	0.09%	0.39%	0.51%	0.61%
Asian alone (NH)	13	13	22	17	21	0.15%	0.14%	0.21%	0.14%	0.20%
Native Hawaiian or Pacific Islander alone (NH)	x	x	3	6	10	x	x	0.03%	0.05%	0.10%
Other race alone (NH)	0	0	9	16	29	0.00%	0.00%	0.09%	0.13%	0.28%
Mixed race or Multiracial (NH)	x	x	93	199	426	x	x	0.88%	1.63%	4.07%
Hispanic or Latino (any race)	75	21	81	173	201	0.85%	0.23%	0.77%	1.42%	1.92%
Total	8,875	9,305	10,516	12,197	10,478	100.00%	100.00%	100.00%	100.00%	100.00%

=== 2020 census ===
As of the 2020 census, there were 10,478 people, 4,244 households, and 3,205 families residing in the county.

The median age was 46.9 years. 20.4% of residents were under the age of 18 and 21.0% of residents were 65 years of age or older. For every 100 females there were 96.7 males, and for every 100 females age 18 and over there were 95.4 males age 18 and over.

The racial makeup of the county was 64.5% White, 28.9% Black or African American, 0.7% American Indian and Alaska Native, 0.2% Asian, 0.1% Native Hawaiian and Pacific Islander, 0.8% from some other race, and 4.8% from two or more races. Hispanic or Latino residents of any race comprised 1.9% of the population.

<0.1% of residents lived in urban areas, while 100.0% lived in rural areas.

There were 4,244 households in the county, of which 28.5% had children under the age of 18 living in them. Of all households, 49.2% were married-couple households, 19.5% were households with a male householder and no spouse or partner present, and 25.4% were households with a female householder and no spouse or partner present. About 27.4% of all households were made up of individuals and 13.9% had someone living alone who was 65 years of age or older.

There were 4,767 housing units, of which 11.0% were vacant. Among occupied housing units, 81.1% were owner-occupied and 18.9% were renter-occupied. The homeowner vacancy rate was 1.0% and the rental vacancy rate was 5.9%.

=== 2010 census ===
At the 2010 census, there were 12,197 people, 3,901 households, and 2,933 families residing in the county. The population density was 31 people per square mile (12 people/km^{2}). There were 4,389 housing units at an average density of 13 units per square mile (5.0 units/km^{2}). The racial makeup of the county was 63.7% White, 33.2% Black or African American, 0.5% Native American, 0.1% Asian, 0.1% Pacific Islander, 0.6% from other races, and 1.8% from two or more races; 1.4% of the population were Hispanic or Latino of any race.

There were 3,901 households, out of which 34.20% had children under the age of 18 living with them, 57.20% were married couples living together, 13.30% had a female householder with no husband present, and 24.80% were non-families; 21.70% of all households were made up of individuals, and 11.30% had someone living alone who was 65 years of age or older. The average household size was 2.66 and the average family size was 3.09.

In the county, the population was spread out, with 26.70% under the age of 18, 6.10% from 18 to 24, 29.10% from 25 to 44, 23.70% from 45 to 64, and 14.40% who were 65 years of age or older. The median age was 38 years. For every 100 females there were 96.20 males. For every 100 females age 18 and over, there were 92.50 males.

The median income for a household in the county was $35,647, and the median income for a family was $41,511. Males had a median income of $32,227 versus $21,014 for females. The per capita income for the county was $15,963. About 14.50% of families and 17.00% of the population were below the poverty line, including 17.90% of those under age 18 and 26.20% of those age 65 or over.

== Government and politics ==
Gates County is run by a council–manager government. The county is led by a five-member board of commissioners. Each member, while representing a single constituency, is elected at-large in staggered four-year terms. Presided over by a chairman elected by the commissioners from among their members for a one-year term, the board is responsible for adopting the county's budget, fixing the local property tax rate, and setting priorities for county government. The county manager is responsible for overseeing most of county administration and executing the will of the board.

Gates County is a member of the Albemarle Commission regional council of governments.

Gates County had previously supported a Republican in federal elections only in Richard Nixon's 1972 landslide, but broke this tradition to support Donald Trump in 2016, 2020, and 2024.

United States presidential election results for Gates County, North Carolina
Year	Republican		Democratic		Third party(ies)	
Year	No.	%	No.	%	No.	%
1912	95	10.65%	618	69.28%	179	20.07%
1916	309	27.22%	826	72.78%	0	0.00%
1920	327	29.12%	796	70.88%	0	0.00%
1924	215	24.02%	679	75.87%	1	0.11%
1928	558	49.38%	572	50.62%	0	0.00%
1932	89	6.91%	1,198	93.01%	1	0.08%
1936	128	7.94%	1,484	92.06%	0	0.00%
1940	108	7.22%	1,388	92.78%	0	0.00%
1944	153	12.16%	1,105	87.84%	0	0.00%
1948	89	8.24%	939	86.94%	52	4.81%
1952	364	22.59%	1,247	77.41%	0	0.00%
1956	341	21.51%	1,244	78.49%	0	0.00%
1960	385	19.91%	1,549	80.09%	0	0.00%
1964	556	24.62%	1,702	75.38%	0	0.00%
1968	406	14.58%	1,151	41.34%	1,227	44.07%
1972	1,264	51.01%	1,177	47.50%	37	1.49%
1976	722	23.84%	2,291	75.66%	15	0.50%
1980	957	27.60%	2,435	70.23%	75	2.16%
1984	1,694	43.10%	2,225	56.62%	11	0.28%
1988	1,451	41.64%	2,024	58.08%	10	0.29%
1992	1,158	30.20%	2,206	57.54%	470	12.26%
1996	1,072	30.27%	2,155	60.84%	315	8.89%
2000	1,480	42.95%	1,944	56.41%	22	0.64%
2004	1,924	47.47%	2,121	52.33%	8	0.20%
2008	2,547	46.99%	2,830	52.21%	43	0.79%
2012	2,564	47.52%	2,786	51.63%	46	0.85%
2016	2,874	53.30%	2,385	44.23%	133	2.47%
2020	3,367	56.39%	2,546	42.64%	58	0.97%
2024	3,538	60.29%	2,268	38.65%	62	1.06%

== Economy ==
Most of Gates County's revenue comes from property taxes on personal property, with a small percentage coming from commercial sources.

=== Industries ===
The main industries are agriculture and forest products. Heritage tourism and recreation are increasing in importance.

== Education ==
Gates County Schools has five schools ranging from pre-kindergarten to twelfth grade. Those five schools are separated into one high school (Gates County Senior High School), one middle school, and three elementary schools.

Gates County is quite prideful in its high school athletics. Gates County High School has won a state championship in football, in 1971. In 2023 the Red Barons soccer team went undefeated in conference play and set a school record for soccer wins in a season.

=== Rosenwald Schools ===
Rosenwald Schools were schools set up by money from the Rosenwald Fund. This fund was created in 1917 by Julius Rosenwald, Chicago businessman and head of Sears Corporation to encourage construction of schools, mostly in the South, for rural black children who were underserved by the segregated public school system. The fund required communities to raise matching funds, including the use of public money and the support of school boards. At the time, the school boards were run by whites. Blacks had been disfranchised throughout the South since the turn of the century, so services for them were typically underfunded.

Black communities strongly supported the schools, raising money, and sometimes contributing both land and labor. In effect they taxed themselves twice to support education. The schools were built to model designs developed by architects at Tuskegee University, a historically black college. The Rosenwald Fund stimulated the construction of more than 4,977 schools and related structures for African-American children before the program ended in 1948 when the fund was depleted.

Seven Rosenwald Schools built in communities in Gates County. In some areas, such schools have been converted to community centers and other uses.

- Corapeake (still standing)
- Reid's Grove (still standing)
- T.S. Cooper
- Hobbsvile
- Reynoldson
- Sunbury
- Roduco

== Communities ==
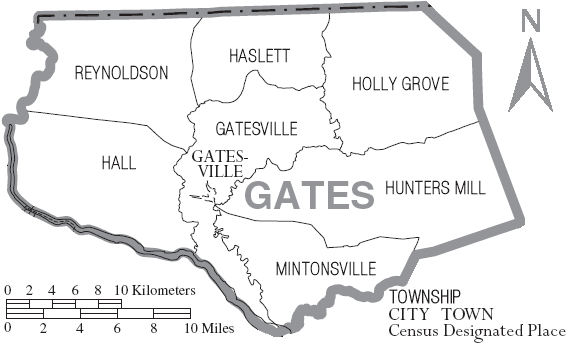
Map of Gates County with municipal and township labels

=== Town ===
- Gatesville (county seat and largest community)

=== Townships ===
- Gatesville
- Hall
- Reynoldson
- Haslett
- Holly Grove
- Hunters Mill
- Mintonsville

=== Census-designated place ===
- Sunbury

=== Unincorporated communities ===
- Buckland
- Corapeake
- Eason Crossroads
- Eure
- Gates
- Hoflers Fork
- Holly Grove
- Hobbsville
- Mintonsville
- Roduco
- Sandy Cross
- Selwin
- Tarheel
- White Oak

=== Post offices ===
- Corapeake
- Sunbury
- Hobbsville
- Gatesville
- Roduco
- Eure
- Gates

== See also ==
- List of counties in North Carolina
- National Register of Historic Places listings in Gates County, North Carolina
- Meherrin Indian Tribe, state-recognized tribe that resides in the county
