= 2011 Durham mayoral election =

Election for mayor of Durham, North Carolina, USA

Durham mayoral election, 2011
- November 8, 2011
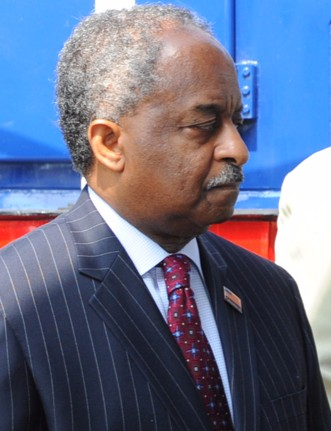

Candidate	Bill Bell	Sylvester Williams
Party	Nonpartisan	Nonpartisan
Popular vote	18,829	4,066
Percentage	81.83%	17.67%
Mayor before election
Bill Bell
Democratic
Elected mayor
Bill Bell
Democratic

The 2011 Durham mayoral election was held on November 8, 2011, to elect the mayor of Durham, North Carolina. It saw the reelection of incumbent mayor Bill Bell.

== Results ==
=== Primary ===
The date of the primary was October 11, 2011.

Primary election results
Candidate	Votes	%
Bill Bell (incumbent)	9,380	80.81
Sylvester Williams	889	7.66
Joe W. Bowser	867	7.47
Ralph Madison McKinney, Jr.	471	4.06
Total votes	11,607	

=== General election ===
General election results
Candidate	Votes	%
Bill Bell (incumbent)	18,829	81.83
Sylvester Williams	4,066	17.67
Write-in	116	0.50
Total votes	23,011	
