= Denis Evers =

English cricketer

Ralph Denis Mark Evers (11 August 1913 – 29 August 2007) was an English athlete and World War II aviator. He was the son of British Lion Guy Evers.

== Early life ==
Ralph Denis Mark Evers, born 11 August 1913 in Pedmore, then part of Worcestershire, was the younger son of Guy Evers of Pedmore, Stourbridge, Worcestershire.

== Athletic career ==
He was in the top racquets pair at Haileybury College in 1932. In 1933 he was the youngest member of the Cambridge Vandals Cricket Club Tour to Canada and the US, playing in both the cricket and rugby matches.

He won the Worcestershire County Squash Championships four times – in 1937/38 and 1946/48.

He played rugby for Sheffield, Westleigh, Leicester Tigers and from 1935 - 1939 as scrum-half for Moseley.

He played cricket as a right-handed batsman. He played for the Sheffield Collegiate, the Birmingham League for Stourbridge and in 15 Championship matches for Worcestershire between 1936 and 1938, captaining the side on 4 occasions. He made 383 runs at an average of 15.32 and had a top score of 60 not out, made against Nottinghamshire in June 1938.

Evers made his first-class debut against Northamptonshire in early July 1936, making 35 and 33. He kept his place in the side for a while thereafter. He made 38 against Surrey and 56 against Warwickshire. He played only once in 1937, but made four appearances the following year, standing in as captain in the absence of usual captain Charles Lyttelton.

== World War II ==
Having enlisted with the 7th Btn of the Worcestershire Territorial Regiment in 1937, he served with the 9th Btn at the beginning of the war before transferring to the RAF in 1941. He joined 55 Squadron as a pilot and was posted to N Africa where he flew in 12/14 raids in the Battle of Alamein. He also saw active service in Sicily and Italy with 500 Squadron and was awarded the Distinguished Flying Cross. On being de-mobbed he had completed 84 bombing raids in 3½ yrs.

== Later life ==
He married Nancy Margaret Green (twin daughter of G H Green of Stourbridge) in 1946 with whom he had 3 daughters. After WW2 he rejoined the family business of firebrick manufacturers in the Midlands and became a Director of Price Pearson Refactories Ltd, Stourbridge. In 1955 he was appointed Deputy County Commissioner, Worcestershire for St John Ambulance Brigade and he was also a JP. He died aged 94 in 2007 in Devon. He was Worcestershire's oldest living cricketer at the time of his death.
