= Sylvia Kerckhoff =

American mayor

Mayor of Durham, North Carolina
- In office 1993–1997
- Preceded by: Harry E. Rodenhizer Jr.
- Succeeded by: Nick Tennyson

Personal details
- Born: June 14, 1928 (age 97) Toledo, Ohio, U.S.
- Education: University of Wisconsin–Madison (BA); Duke University (MA)

Sylvia Kerckhoff (born June 14, 1928) is an American politician who served as the mayor of Durham, North Carolina, from 1993 to 1997.

== Early life and education ==
Kerckhoff was born in Toledo, Ohio, in 1928. She graduated from the University of Wisconsin–Madison in 1950 with a degree in psychology and later went to Duke University, from which she graduated in 1960 with a Master of Arts in history and education.

== Career ==
Kerckhoff became Durham's first female mayor after defeating incumbent Harry Rodenhizer in the 1993 Durham mayoral election. She was reelected the 1995 Durham mayoral election.

== See also ==
- List of first women mayors
