= Thad A. Eure =

American politician

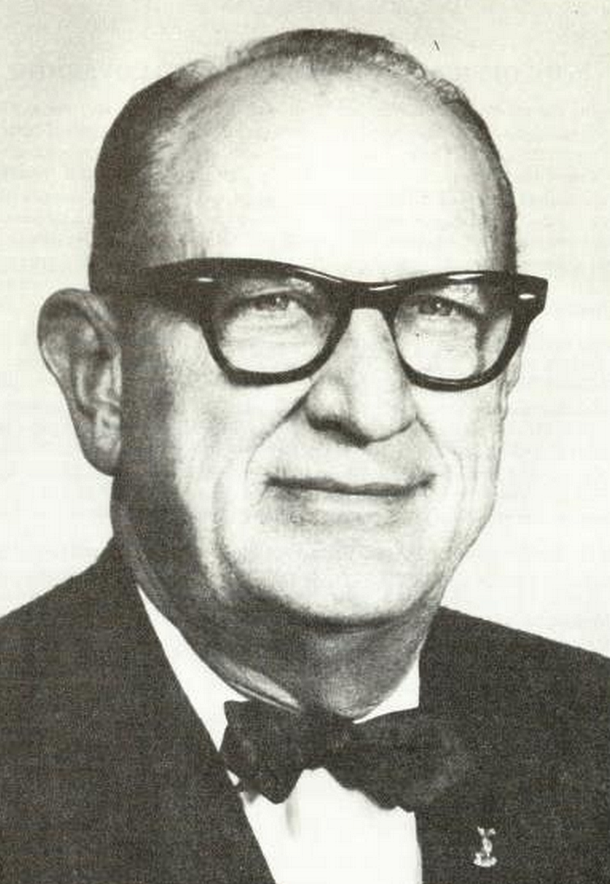

20th Secretary of State of North Carolina
- In office December 21, 1936 – January 7, 1989
- Governor: See list (13): John C. B. Ehringhaus Clyde R. Hoey J. Melville Broughton R. Gregg Cherry W. Kerr Scott William B. Umstead Luther H. Hodges Terry Sanford Dan K. Moore Robert W. Scott James Holshouser James B. Hunt Jr. James G. Martin
- Preceded by: Charles G. Powell
- Succeeded by: Rufus Edmisten

Member of the North Carolina House of Representatives from Hertford County
- In office 1929–1931
- Preceded by: William W. Rogers
- Succeeded by: Henry Hugh Jones

Personal details
- Born: November 15, 1899 Gates County, North Carolina, U.S.
- Died: July 21, 1993 (aged 93) Raleigh, North Carolina, U.S.
- Resting place: Historic Oakwood Cemetery; Raleigh, North Carolina
- Party: Democratic
- Spouse: Minta Banks (m. 1924)
- Children: 2
- Parent: Tazewell A. Eure (father)
- Education: University of North Carolina at Chapel Hill; Elon University

Military service
- Allegiance: United States
- Branch/service: United States Army
- Battles/wars: World War I

Thaddeus Armie Eure (November 15, 1899 – July 21, 1993) was an American politician who holds the record for longest tenure as an elected official in the United States, serving as North Carolina Secretary of State from 1936 to 1989.

== Early life ==
Born in Gates County, North Carolina, Eure was the son of Tazewell Augustus Eure and Armecia Langston Eure. A farmer, Tazewell Eure was in the first graduating class at North Carolina Agricultural and Mechanical College (now North Carolina State University) and served in the North Carolina House of Representatives from 1925–1927.

He was the oldest of five Eure children. He grew up on an 80-acre farm that grew cotton, corn, and peanuts. He graduated valedictorian from the now-closed Gatesville High School in 1917.

He attended the University of North Carolina where he was a member of the Theta Chi fraternity. He left UNC to serve in the Army during World War I, returning to Chapel Hill, North Carolina to attend the University of North Carolina Law School, graduating in 1922.

== Career ==
Prior to his service as secretary of state, Eure served as mayor of Winton, North Carolina at age 27, and as a state legislator. In 1987, President Ronald Reagan recognized Eure as having held public office longer than any official in the nation at that time, with more than 64 years of continuous service. In his later years, he was known as the "oldest rat in the Democratic barn."

Eure campaigned to become North Carolina Secretary of State in 1936. Backed by the Shelby Dynasty, he won.

Eure was the last living member of the North Carolina legislature to have voted to approve the establishment of the North Carolina State Highway Patrol in 1929. During his tenure as Secretary of State, Eure was asked by Highway Patrol leadership to give the swearing-in oath of office to graduating troopers in each basic school class at the North Carolina Highway Patrol School, which was first conducted at UNC-Chapel Hill and later in Raleigh at the present campus on Garner Road. Eure would proudly address each class and he signed each individual trooper's oath certificate in his trademark green ink. When his physical condition weakened in 1985, then-North Carolina Governor James G. Martin assigned a trooper to drive Eure to and from work each day.

Eure also served on the board of trustees of Elon University from 1942 to 1989 (chairman, 1955–1989).

In December 1945 the North Carolina youth legislature program held a mock session in the North Carolina State Capitol. Representing student leaders from the state's white colleges, the body passed a resolution to invite delegations from the state's black colleges to the subsequent session. Eure requested a special meeting with the body, where he told them, "I am fearful that you may be jeopardizing the beautiful picture toward which we are moving". He urged them to "go slowly", but the students refused to alter their decision.

Having been elected to 13 terms as Secretary of State, Eure holds the record for most won North Carolina statewide elections by any public official.

== Personal life ==
Eure married Minta Banks on November 15, 1924. They had two children, Thad Eure, Jr. and Armecia Eure Black.

Eure was an early investor in his son Thad Eure, Jr.'s restaurant empire. Eure Jr was a famous restaurateur in Raleigh, North Carolina, founding the legendary steakhouse The Angus Barn, reviving the 42nd Street Oyster Bar and being responsible for the Darryl's and Fat Daddy's chains.

Eure died of complications of gallbladder surgery in 1993. His body lay in state at the North Carolina State Capitol. He was buried in Historic Oakwood Cemetery in Raleigh, North Carolina. Known for wearing bow ties January 6, 1989 was declared "Red Bow Tie Day" in North Carolina to honor Eure and his service.

Eure's trademarks were his bow ties and always signing in green ink.

== Works cited ==
- Ashby, Warren (1980). Frank Porter Graham : A Southern Liberal. Winston Salem: John F. Blair. ISBN 0-89587-009-6.
- Christensen, Rob (2010). The Paradox of Tar Heel Politics : The Personalities, Elections, and Events That Shaped Modern North Carolina (second ed.). Chapel Hill: The University of North Carolina Press. ISBN 978-0-8078-7151-5.

Party political offices
Preceded by Stacey W. Wade	Democratic nominee for North Carolina Secretary of State; 1936, 1940, 1944, 1948, 1952, 1956, 1960, 1964, 1968, 1972, 1976, 1980, 1984	Succeeded by Rufus Edmisten
Political offices
Preceded by Charles G. Powell	Secretary of State of North Carolina; 1936–1989	Succeeded by Rufus L. Edmisten
