= Ewers =

Ewers is a surname, and may refer to:

- Anna Ewers (born 1993), German model
- Dave Ewers (born 1990), Zimbabwean rugby player
- Ezra P. Ewers (born c. 1840), American Civil War soldier
- Hanns Heinz Ewers (1871–1943), German writer, philosopher, and actor
- John C. Ewers (1909–1997), American ethnologist and museum curator
- John K. Ewers (1904–1978), Australian novelist and poet
- Marisa Ewers (born 1989), German footballer
- Quinn Ewers (born 2003), American football player
- Randy Ewers (born 1968), American politician
- Veronica Ewers (born 1994), American cyclist
- Walter Ewers (1892–1918), German World War I pilot

== See also ==
- Gustav von Ewers (1779–1830), German legal historian
- 12843 Ewers, an asteroid discovered in 1997
- Ewer (disambiguation)
