= Euer =

Euer is a surname. Notable people with the surname include:

- Dawn Euer (born 1979), American politician
- Ralph Euer (c. 1350–1422), English knight

== See also ==
- Auer (surname)
