= Thomas Stith III =

American politician

Thomas A. Stith III is an American politician. Stith was a member of the city council of Durham, North Carolina from 1999 to 2007. More recently, he has served as Program Director for Economic Development at the University of North Carolina at Chapel Hill's Frank Hawkins Kenan Institute of Private Enterprise, and then as North Carolina district director for the federal Small Business Administration. In December 2020, Stith was selected as the next president of the North Carolina Community College System.

== Political career ==
An alumnus of North Carolina Central University, Stith worked for the conservative John William Pope Civitas Institute. He was first elected to the Durham City Council in 1999 and re-elected in 2001 and 2003, holding one of the at-large seats on the council.

Stith unsuccessfully campaigned for the Republican nomination for North Carolina Lieutenant Governor in the 2004 election cycle.

=== 2007 mayoral campaign ===
Stith ran for mayor of Durham against incumbent Democrat Bill Bell in 2007. Stith attacked Bell over several city issues including violence. During the weekend of October 13 and October 14, two people were murdered in Durham. On October 15, Bill Bell tried to calm the public about the murders, claiming the city was safe and the weekend murders were not random. The next day, Stith went after Bell, pointing out that Durham's murder rate was up nearly 50 percent over the previous year. Stith and Bell continued to argue over how to deal with Durham crime. Stith consistently claimed that he would fight crime more consistently than Bell had, while Bell said that Stith had six years on the town council to do that. Stith said he wanted to see more police officers on the streets, while Bell said the current police officers are well equipped.

In late October 2007, after lead was found in Durham drinking water, Stith sent out a campaign mailer that said in bold letters: "Bill Bell knew and didn't tell us our water was dangerous to drink." Mayor Bell responded to this by saying "That mailer sent out by Thomas Stith was a complete lie." Mayor Bell also said that Stith had no leadership experience.

Stith lost to Bell in the election on November 6, 2007, garnering approximately 42% of the vote to Bell's 58%. Stith's at-large seat on the City Council was won by Farad Ali, marking the end of Stith's stint as a council member.

=== McCrory administration ===
In 2012, Governor-elect Pat McCrory named Stith his transition director and he then served as the Governor's Chief of Staff when McCrory assumed office in January 2013.
