= National Register of Historic Places listings in Gates County, North Carolina =

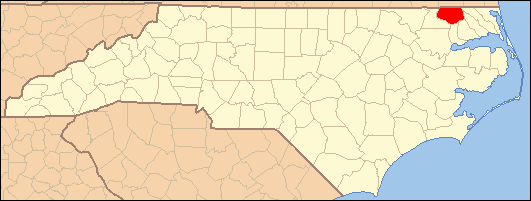

This list includes properties and districts listed on the National Register of Historic Places in Gates County, North Carolina. Click the "Map of all coordinates" link to the right to view a Google map of all properties and districts with latitude and longitude coordinates in the table below.

== Current listings ==
This National Park Service list is complete through NPS recent listings posted March 14, 2025.

	Name on the Register	Image	Date listed	Location	City or town	Description
1	Buckland	Buckland	March 5, 1986 (#86000407)	NC 37 at SR 1220; 36°28′32″N 76°45′47″W	Buckland	
2	Elmwood Plantation	Elmwood Plantation	February 1, 1972 (#72000963)	East of Gatesville near junction of SR 1400 and NC 37; 36°23′39″N 76°41′58″W	Gatesville	
3	Eure-Roberts House	Eure-Roberts House	September 20, 2006 (#06000868)	212 W. Main St. 36°24′17″N 76°45′10″W	Gatesville	
4	Freeman House	Freeman House	September 23, 1982 (#82003454)	North of Gates on U.S. Route 13; 36°33′03″N 76°45′20″W	Gates	Extends into Suffolk, Virginia
5	Joseph Freeman Farm	Joseph Freeman Farm	November 12, 1999 (#99001333)	Northwest side of SR 1213, 0.7 miles northeast of the junction with SR 1212; 36°32′18″N 76°47′19″W	Gates	
6	Gates County Courthouse	Gates County Courthouse	October 22, 1976 (#76001325)	Court St. 36°24′13″N 76°45′11″W	Gatesville	
7	Reid's Grove School	Reid's Grove School	August 30, 2011 (#11000621)	931 Main St. 36°25′08″N 76°45′27″W	Gatesville	
8	Roberts-Carter House	Roberts-Carter House	March 1, 1984 (#84002310)	Off NC 37; 36°21′40″N 76°43′01″W	Gatesville	Destroyed by tornado, 1984.
9	Rountree Family Farm	Rountree Family Farm	August 2, 2000 (#00000881)	049 NC 37 N 36°26′26″N 76°45′29″W	Gatesville	
10	Sunbury High School	Sunbury High School	May 12, 2009 (#09000332)	101 NC 32 N. 36°26′48″N 76°36′19″W	Sunbury	

== See also ==
- National Register of Historic Places listings in North Carolina
- List of National Historic Landmarks in North Carolina
