= Freeman House =

Freeman House or variations such as Freeman Farm may refer to:

in Nigeria

- Freeman House, Lagos

in the United States

(by state then town or city)

- Albert Colton and H. H. Freeman House, Florence, Arizona, listed on the National Register of Historic Places (NRHP) in Pinal County
- John A. Freeman House, Snowflake, Arizona, listed on the NRHP in Navajo County
- Freeman-Felker House, Rogers, Arkansas, listed on the NRHP
- Wood Freeman House No. 1, Searcy, Arkansas, listed on the NRHP
- Wood Freeman House No. 2, Searcy, Arkansas, listed on the NRHP
- Samuel Freeman House in Hollywood, Los Angeles, California, designed by Frank Lloyd Wright.
- Mary and Eliza Freeman Houses, Bridgeport, Connecticut, listed on the NRHP in Connecticut
- A. C. Freeman House in Punta Gorda, Florida, listed on the NRHP in Florida
- Freeman-Hurt House, Oakman, Georgia, listed on the NRHP in Gordon County
- Freeman-Brewer-Sawyer House, Hillsboro, Illinois, listed on the NRHP
- Clarkson W. Freeman House, Springfield, Illinois, listed on the NRHP
- Freeman-Zumbrunn House, Chapman, Kansas, listed on the NRHP in Kansas
- Davis-Freeman House, Gloucester, Massachusetts, listed on the NRHP
- Cottage-Freeman Historic District, North Attleborough, Massachusetts, listed on the NRHP
- Freeman Farm Historic District, Gray, Maine, listed on the NRHP
- Reuben Freeman House, Inver Grove Heights, Minnesota, listed on the NRHP
- Freeman House (Guilderland, New York), listed on the NRHP in New York
- Freeman House (Gates, North Carolina), listed on the NRHP in North Carolina
- Joseph Freeman Farm, Gates, North Carolina, listed on the NRHP in North Carolina
- Freeman House (Murfreesboro, North Carolina), listed on the NRHP in North Carolina
- Lewis Freeman House, Pittsboro, North Carolina, listed on the NRHP in North Carolina
- King-Freeman-Speight House, Republican, North Carolina, listed on the NRHP in North Carolina
- James W. Freeman House, Wilton, North Carolina, listed on the NRHP in North Carolina
- Freeman Farm (Frankston, Texas), listed on the NRHP in Texas
- Freeman Plantation House, Jefferson, Texas, listed on the NRHP in Texas
- Roscius S. and Lydia R. Freeman House, River Falls, Wisconsin, listed on the NRHP in Wisconsin
