= Quinton Ballard =

American football player (born 1960)

No. 97
- Position: Defensive tackle

Personal information
- Born: November 18, 1960 (age 66); Ahoskie, North Carolina, U.S.
- Listed height: 6 ft 3 in (1.91 m)
- Listed weight: 289 lb (131 kg)

Career information
- High school: Gates County (NC)
- College: Elon (1979–1982)
- NFL draft: 1983: undrafted

Career history
- Baltimore/Indianapolis Colts (1983–1984); Miami Dolphins (1985)*; Indianapolis Colts (1986)*
- * Offseason or practice squad member only

Awards and highlights
- Elon Athletic Hall of Fame (2008)

Career NFL statistics
- Games played: 15
- Games started: 4
- Sacks: 2.0
- Stats at Pro Football Reference

Quinton McCoy Ballard (born November 18, 1960) is an American former professional football player who was a defensive tackle for one season with the Baltimore Colts of the National Football League (NFL). He played college football for the Elon Phoenix, helping them win two national championships, and was signed by the Colts as an undrafted free agent in 1983. He also spent time with the Miami Dolphins.

== Early life and education ==
Ballard was born on November 18, 1960, in Ahoskie, North Carolina. He was the youngest of five sons, and each of his brothers also played college football, including Joe, an All-American for North Carolina A&T and Horace, a four-year starter for Livingstone. He grew up in Gatesville and attended Gates County Senior High School, at which he was an all-star football lineman.

Ballard began playing college football for the Elon Fightin' Christians in 1979. He helped them win the NAIA national championship in 1980. He broke his wrist in the championship, and it had not healed by the 1981 season, but he played anyway and led them to another national championship. As a senior, he played through a badly sprained ankle. By the end of his college career following the 1982 season, Ballard had compiled over 200 total tackles and 20 sacks.

== Professional career ==
As a result of his injury as a senior, Ballard was the last player on the BLESTO scouting combine list and did not get selected in either the 1984 NFL draft or 1984 USFL draft. He attended a mini-camp held by the New Jersey Generals, but was not offered a contract. Later, he received offers from two NFL teams: the Baltimore Colts and Denver Broncos, accepting the former. Although considered a longshot, Ballard ended up making the team. He spent most of the season as a backup, but became starter due to another player's injury for week ten against the New York Jets. Going up against All-Pro Marvin Powell in the game, he made eight solo tackles, an assist, posted a pass deflection and made one sack, being given the game ball by the Colts following the 17–14 win. He finished the season having appeared in 15 games, four as a starter, and made two sacks.

Ballard entered the 1984 training camp weighing at 309 pounds, and was told by the coaching staff he needed to get down to 290. He changed his diet and lost weight, but suffered an injury and was placed on injured reserve prior to the regular season. In 1985, Ballard was signed by the Miami Dolphins, but was hampered by an injury and played sparingly in the preseason, eventually being released during roster cuts. He attempted a return in 1986 with the Colts, but was released in July of that year.

== Later life ==
Ballard was inducted into the Elon Athletic Hall of Fame in 2008.
