= Gates County Schools =

School district in North Carolina, United States

Location
- Gates County, North Carolina United States

District information
- Type: Public
- Grades: PK–12
- Superintendent: Barry Williams
- Schools: 5
- Budget: $ 20,848,000
- NCES District ID: 3701680

Students and staff
- Students: 1,872
- Teachers: 148.00 (on FTE basis)
- Staff: 159.74 (on FTE basis)
- Student–teacher ratio: 12.65:1

Other information
- Website: coserver.gates.k12.nc.us

Gates County Schools is a PK–12 graded school district serving Gates County, North Carolina. Its five schools serve 1,872 students as of the 2010–11 school year.

== Student demographics ==
For the 2010–11 school year, Gates County Schools had a total population of 1,872 students and 148.00 teachers on a (FTE) basis. This produced a student-teacher ratio of 12.65:1. That same year, out of the student total, the gender ratio was 50% male to 50% female. The demographic group makeup was: White, 59%; Black, 36%; Hispanic, 1%; American Indian, 0%; and Asian/Pacific Islander, 0% (two or more races: 3%). For the same school year, 52.38% of the students received free and reduced-cost lunches.

== Governance ==
The primary governing body of Gates County Schools follows a council–manager government format with a five-member Board of Education appointing a Superintendent to run the day-to-day operations of the system. The school system currently resides in the North Carolina State Board of Education's First District.

=== Board of education ===
The five members of the Board of Education generally meet on the first Monday of each month. The current members of the board are: G. Douglas Lilley (Chair), Glendale P. Boone (Vice-Chair, Leslie S. Byrum, Ray Felton, and Claire R. Whitehurst.

=== Superintendent ===
The current superintendent of the system is Barry Williams. He took over as superintendent in January, 2012, from the interim superintendent Earl Norfleet. Williams was originally from Appalachia, Virginia, but was most recently superintendent of the Rangely School District RE-4 in Rangely, Colorado.

== Member schools ==
Gates County Schools has five schools ranging from pre-kindergarten to twelfth grade. Those five schools are separated into one high schools, one middle school, and three elementary schools.

=== High schools ===
- Gates County Senior High School (Gatesville)

=== Middle schools ===
- Central Middle School (Gatesville)

=== Elementary schools ===
- Buckland Elementary School (Gates)
- Gatesville Elementary School (Gatesville)
- T. S. Cooper Elementary School (Sunbury)

== Awards ==
The Gates County Schools system has had one school listed as a Blue Ribbon School: Gatesville Elementary School (1986–87).

== See also ==
- List of school districts in North Carolina
