= Delmar T. Spivey =

United States Air Force general (1905–1982)

Delmar Taft Spivey
- Spivey as a United States Military Academy cadet c. 1928
- Born: August 9, 1905; Gatesville, North Carolina
- Died: January 18, 1982 (aged 76); Pinellas County, Florida
- Military career
- Allegiance: United States of America
- Branch: United States Air Force; United States Army Air Forces; United States Army Air Corps
- Service years: 1928–1956
- Rank: Major General
- Service number: O-17278,
- Commands: Air War College; Central Air Defense Force; Japan Air Self-Defense Force; 314th Air Division
- Conflicts: World War II
- Awards: Distinguished Service Medal; Legion of Merit (2); Bronze Star; Air Medal; Commander of the Order of the British Empire

Major General Delmar Taft Spivey (August 9, 1905 – January 18, 1982) was an American military officer involved with aerial gunnery systems development, air education, and command structure. During World War II, he was the senior American officer of Center Compound, Stalag Luft III prisoner of war camp in Sagan, Germany.

== Early life and education ==
Delmar Taft Spivey was born in Gatesville, North Carolina, on August 9, 1905. After graduating from high school at Whaleyville, Virginia, in 1922, he attended the College of William & Mary, Williamsburg, Virginia. Graduating from the U.S. Military Academy on June 9, 1928, he was appointed a second lieutenant of Infantry and assigned as a platoon leader at Fort Benning, Georgia. Entering flying school in June 1929, he graduated a year later, transferred to the Air Corps and was assigned to Langley Field, Virginia. On February 20, 1930, Lt. Spivey, of the 52d School Squadron (11th School Group), made a forced landing when the motor of Atlantic DH-4M-2, 23–685, failed, the airframe suffering moderate damage when it came down two miles south of Brooks Field, San Antonio, Texas.

The Air Corps News Letter published this account on March 5, 1930:

THREE SAFE LANDINGS IN TWO DAYS

Three forced landings in two days is the record of Lt. D.T. Spivey. student at Brooks Field, who climaxed the performance by escaping unscathed when his plane was completely demolished in trying to land in a very small field recently. Lt. Spivey started out with the cross-country flight of Brooks Field students to Galveston, Texas, but was forced down near Needham with a broken gas line. By the time he had repaired the line, most of his gas was gone and not having had time to pick out a landing place near any filling stations he had to borrow as much gas as he could from some passing motorists. Taking off again, he headed for Houston, Texas, because he thought he did not have enough gas to get to his destination. Shortly afterwards he discovered he did not have enough to get to Houston and made a second forced landing a few miles outside of that city. This time he was able to get sufficient fuel to get to Galveston, where he stopped overnight.

Upon his return to Brooks Field he was commended for his persistence in seeking his objective and managing two forced landings without mishap. In the afternoon he was assigned to formation flying. The formation returned to the field at about 3:00 p.m., but before reaching his destination the motor of his DH machine went bad, and for the third time he hurriedly scanned the ground below in search of a convenient pasture. The only one available was a small one, bordered by trees. Lieut. Spivey managed to land, but when he did so the plane separated into its component parts and assorted small bits.

"Three times and out," observed Lt. Spivey as he disentangled himself from the wreckage, checked himself over to see if he was still complete, and waved the rest of the flight, now circling overhead, back to the field. Somewhat later he returned to Brooks none the worse for the crash, although one glance at the wreck was enough to convince officials at the field that the plane was not worth repairing.

== Military career ==
Assigned in June 1933 to the 65th Service Squadron at Luke Field, Hawaii, two years later Spivey became engineering officer of the 64th School Squadron at Kelly Field, Texas, and in January 1936 was named assistant engineering officer there. In April 1936 he became an instructor at the flying school at Kelly Field, and a year later was appointed chief of the bomb section there. On April 14, 1938, he experienced a ground collision in a landing accident at Kelly Field, in which North American BT-9B, 37–166, of the 64th School Squadron, received moderate damage.

Becoming materiel officer of the 23d Composite Group in July 1938, with which he served at Maxwell Field, Alabama, and Orlando, Florida, two years later the general assumed command of a squadron at the Air Corps Proving Ground, Eglin Field, Florida, and in January 1941 was appointed executive officer of the Air Corps Proving Ground. In December 1939, Captains Spivey and George W. Mundy, both of the 23d Composite Group, had flown two Curtiss YP-37s to Eglin Field for engine testing, the first of thousands of service tests. Two months prior, Spivey had suffered a landing accident on October 10 at Maxwell Field, Alabama, in which Curtiss P-36C Hawk, 38–187, c/n 12601, of the 1st Pursuit Squadron (Single Engine), 23d Composite Group, received minor damage.

When Brigadier General Muir S. Fairchild, executive officer of the Army Air Forces, arrived at Eglin Field by plane from New Orleans for a brief inspection tour of the growing post in mid-November 1941, he was hosted by Major Spivey, who was in command of the field during the temporary absence of Major George W. Mundy.

== World War II ==
In April 1942, Lt. Col. Spivey assumed command of the Fixed Gunnery School at Eglin Field, and in February 1942 was named commander of the Central Instructors School and Flexible Gunnery School at Buckingham Field, Fort Myers, Florida. He arrived there from Maxwell Field on May 9, and four days later was notified of his promotion to full colonel.

While construction workers built the new air field, Col. Spivey assembled a team of instructors drawn from the aerial gunnery school cadre at Tyndall Field located near Panama City, Florida. Tyndall Field instructors trained the first aerial gunnery students before America's entry into the war. Spivey based the initial curricula and training exercises on the previous experience gleaned from the pre-war period. In addition, the extensive literature and field guides from the British Royal Air Force's aerial gunnery school influenced Spivey.

The content and comparison of the curricula of flexible gunnery schools are necessary to an understanding of the discussion of specific training problems. Planning of curricula and preparation of textbooks was the work, in large part, of Maj. W. L. Kennedy and Col. Delmar T. Spivey. The former, after a study of the English flexible gunnery schools in the summer of 1941, prepared the first five week's course at Harlingen and aided in the preparation of textbooks to be used there. Colonel Spivey, project officer at Buckingham Army Air Field, performed a similar service for that station. In the early stages of their existence, flexible gunnery schools used as guide books Training Manual 1–271 and a Navy Department booklet, 'Air Gunnery.' After examining all available publications on gunnery in his planning for the school and comparing the results of his investigation with the subject matter of the two books, Colonel Spivey suggested to LAI? [sic] Headquarters the preparation of another text embracing some principles from each of the former ones.

"Throughout his tenure, Spivey demanded that all officers and enlisted men 'live and think only of gunnery.' Often Spivey was seen on the firing ranges and visiting students in classrooms to provide inspiration and leadership." Col. Spivey remained in command of Buckingham Field until March 23, 1943, when he was designated the A-3 operations officer of the Southeast Training Command at Maxwell Field, remaining there until June 1943.

Assigned with the Eighth Air Force in Europe, on August 12, 1943, while serving as an observer on a Boeing B-17 Flying Fortress of the 92d Bomb Group, piloted by Eugene M. Wiley, on a mission to hit the rail marshalling yards at Gelsenkirchen, Germany, in the industrial Ruhr region, Colonel Spivey was shot down. As the USAAF expert on aerial gunnery, he was on this mission to evaluate how to improve gun turrets.

Hit by flak, which knocked out the number one engine, and fighters, which set number three afire, the bomber, B-17F-85-BO, 42-30081, 'P-YO', named "USS Aliquippa", of the 407th Bomb Squadron, 92d Bomb Group, crash-landed near the Dutch border at Ahaus, NW of Münster. All eleven crew were captured. (MACR 655) One source credits Lt. Fritz Karch in a Bf 109G-6 of JG 2/6 with the kill. With his capture, Spivey became the highest ranking prisoner of war in the ETO.

== POW ==
When Colonel Delmar T. Spivey entered [the camp] in late July, [sic] 1943, he was a full colonel and twice the age of most of his fellow inmates. The senior staff immediately realized that his seniority and West Point training would catapult him into prominence as a leader. To reduce the chances of his inadvertently giving away important secrets to the Germans, the staff quickly briefed him on the entire spectrum of camp activities, including the vital covert intelligence and escape work that had been painfully developed during the three years since the first Allied fliers were captured by the Germans.

This included the three escape tunnels well underway, Tom, Dick and Harry. During the succeeding days he learned about the prisoners' forgery operation, covert communications with London and Washington, education and theatrical programs, and play on the athletic field.

Two weeks later Spivey assumed command as Senior American Officer (SAO) of Center Compound. Still dazzled by what he had seen, he reflected on the need to record for posterity the amazing activities he saw at every turn. If nothing else, he reasoned, the account might make it easier for the next generation of prisoners and save them the trouble of having to 'invent the wheel all over again.' As logical and intriguing as the idea sounded, Spivey knew there were great risks. The Germans obviously would love to get their hands on so revealing a document. He nonetheless decided to proceed with the effort, knowing that everything hinged on the careful observance of numerous precautions and safeguards.

This coded and carefully hidden history was retrieved and carried at no little risk when the camp was hastily evacuated in late January 1945, as the Germans marched the prisoners away from the rapidly advancing Russian armies. The documents served as the basis and initial impetus for "Stalag Luft III – The Secret Story", a definitive history of the camp, by Col. Arthur A. Durand, USAF (Ret.).

When word reached the camp that 50 of the 76 escapees had been shot after the break out of March 24–25, 1944, Spivey called the prisoners together and told them "Gentlemen, we're helpless and hopeless."

== Evacuation and diplomatic intrigue ==
On January 27, 1945, the prisoners of all three compounds of Stalag Luft III were hastily evacuated as the Soviets advanced from the east and the camp complement and guards began a march in a blizzard to the garrison town of Spremberg, a sixty mile journey that took three days, and which was as hard on the guards as it was for the prisoners. There, Spivey and General Arthur W. Vanaman, the highest ranking American prisoner to be captured during the war, were separated from the POWs, the "kriegies" going by train to a large camp at Moosburg, in Eastern Bavaria, and the two officers taken to Berlin to meet with representatives of SS Lieutenant General Gottlob Berger, who was still in charge of Luftwaffe prison camps.

"Working through the Swiss government, Berger made arrangements for Red Cross parcels supplies to be delivered from Geneva to Allied prisoners of war who were being moved from the Eastern Front. Like his earlier effort to prevent his own SS from taking over control of the Luft camps after the Great Escape, this was a calculated effort by Berger to appease the approaching Western Allies.

After arranging for Red Cross food relief, Berger summoned Vanaman and Spivey to his heavily guarded headquarters. He wanted Vanaman to take a message to Eisenhower conveying his desire to negotiate - by secret radio codes - a separate peace with the Western Allies. This would allow a reinvigorated Wehrmacht to push the Russians back to the Oder. High-ranking army officers would then murder Hitler and Himmler - who were madmen, Berger said - and arrange an 'orderly and correct surrender' of the country to the Western Allies. Berger would do this, he told Spivey and Vanaman, to save his country from the Bolshevik beasts. He also claimed that he wanted to save the lives of Allied POWs, whom Hitler was threatening to kill as payback for Dresden.

Vanaman agreed to work with Berger only after he stopped the forced POW marches and sped up food delivery to the men. He and Spivey were then smuggled into neutral Switzerland and Vanaman flown to France to meet with Lieutenant General Carl Spaatz, who was incredulous at Berger's peace proposal. "'Somebody sure pulled your leg,' he told Vanaman. He then sent Vanaman to Washington to get rid of him. The general made a full report to the War Department which was conspicuously ignored."

Upon return to allied control in April 1945, Col. Spivey was assigned to the Supreme Headquarters of the Allied Expeditionary Forces in Europe.

== Post-war ==
In August 1945 Colonel Spivey became assistant chief of Air Staff for Personnel of the Air Training Command at Fort Worth, Texas. The following month he was named assistant to the chief of staff of the Air Training Command, and in October 1945 was appointed deputy chief of staff of the command, retaining that position when the command headquarters moved to Barksdale Field, Louisiana, in April 1946.

Entering the National War College in August 1946, upon graduation the following June the general became chief of the Academic Staff of the Air University at Maxwell Field, Alabama. In July 1948 he was appointed commander for education at the Air University, and a year later became director of education there.

General Spivey in August 1949 was appointed chief of the Plans Division, Office of the Deputy Chief of Staff for Operations at U.S. Air Force headquarters. A year later he was assigned to Fifth Air Force headquarters at Nagoya, Japan, and soon afterward assumed command of the Rear Echelon of the Fifth Air Force (August 6, 1950 – December 1, 1950). In December 1950 he was named commanding general of the 314th Air Division in Japan. Upon the inactivation of the 314th Air Division in February 1952, General Spivey was designated commander of the Japan Air Defense Force (December 1, 1950 – January 20, 1953).

== Final assignments ==
Returning to the United States in February 1953, the general was appointed commanding general of the Central Air Defense Force, Air Defense Command, at Kansas City, Missouri. Moving to Maxwell Air Force Base, Alabama, in July 1954, he was designated commandant of the Air War College, Air University (July 26, 1954 – June 15, 1956) until June 16, 1956, when he became a patient at the Air University Hospital.

== Post-service career ==
Following his military retirement, General Spivey, 56, served as Superintendent of Culver Military Academy, Culver, Indiana, from September 1956 to 1967.

In 1965, he smoothly integrated Culver. "Then-superintendent Gen. Delmar T. Spivey, according to an article in the summer, 1987 Culver Alumni magazine on the school's black student history, had said prior to the 1965 school year, 'Our policy has always been that when a qualified black student applies, he will be admitted,' and without fanfare, added the superintendent – which was just what happened."

An article in the September 1966 issue of Boys' Life magazine states that

In ten years as superintendent, General Spivey has, with what an associate calls "dynamic ease," raised Culver to the top rank of prep schools in the U.S. He's brought in over eight million dollars with his "Program of Excellence," by getting Culver alumni in clubs across the country to speak up and give to their school. He's raised faculty salaries and created scores of new scholarships, including Boy Scout scholarships. "At Culver," he tells you, "a boy learns the responsibility of command. He also learns that here, as in life, the best man – whether an artist, a scholar, or athlete – will win out." The general has said he sometimes thinks that running Culver "is tougher than fighting a war." Yet, despite his heavy involvement, he gives much time to scouting as a member of the executive board of the Tri-Valley Council, in South Bend, Ind. For his outstanding work, General Spivey last year received the Silver Antelope – one of Scoutings [sic] highest awards for service to youth.

Upon departing Culver, General Spivey and his wife retired to Largo, Florida, with a vacation house in Maine.

General Spivey died in 1982. Memorial services were held on January 22, 1982, at the Episcopal Church of Ascension in Clearwater, Florida.

Ginny Spivey, wife of General Spivey, was hostess to students and VIPs of the Academy. She died on October 22, 1997.

== Publications ==
In April 1959, Superintendent Spivey published a volume titled "Culver Military Academy: A Dedicated Institution", which went through two printings. (Indianapolis, Indiana: Newcomen Society, April 1959.) He also authored a book on his experiences as the senior American POW officer in Stalag Luft III (Center Compound). Titled: "POW Odyssey: Recollections of Center Compound, Stalag Luft III and the Secret German Peace Mission in World War II", it was published in 1984. The Delmar T. Spivey, collection, 1943–1978, running five linear feet, and used in the production of this manuscript, is archived at the United States Air Force Academy in Colorado Springs, Colorado.

== Family ==
Delmar Spivey was married to Virginia B. Spivey, (a New Jersey native, born April 4, 1907, died October 22, 1997, in Largo, Pinellas County, Florida), and the 1940 census lists a son, Delmar B. Spivey, age 8. Delmar B. Spivey would also join the U.S. Air Force in 1955, graduating in navigator class 58-03 at James Connally Air Force Base, Texas, and later served as a navigator with a special operations squadron, the 309th Air Commando Squadron, flying UC-123 Providers, on Operation Ranch Hand missions in Vietnam in 1966. He later crewed Lockheed C-141 Starlifters. He retired from the Air Force on Wednesday August 31, 1977, with the rank of lieutenant colonel, his final assignment being with the Operations Plans Division of the 463d Tactical Airlift Wing, Dyess AFB, Texas. He is rated a master navigator, with 5,286 hours flying time. He died May 4, 2006.

== Commemoration ==
In 1967, two distinguished physicians and graduates of Culver Military Academy, Dr. Richard U. Light, Class of 1920, and his brother Rudolph Light, Class of 1927, established the Major General Delmar T. Spivey Award for Excellence in Teaching to recognize and encourage superior teaching, particularly among younger, promising members of the faculty. Because of General Spivey's many contributions to the encouragement of excellence in teaching at the Academy, the award was named in honor of Culver's sixth Superintendent.

== Decorations ==
His decorations include the Legion of Merit with oak leaf cluster, Bronze Star Medal, Air Medal and the Order of the British Empire (Honorary Commander). He is rated a command pilot.
