= General Mundy =

General Mundy may refer to:

- Carl E. Mundy III (born 1960), U.S. Marine Corps lieutenant general
- Carl Epting Mundy Jr. (1935–2014), U.S. Marine Corps four-star general
- George W. Mundy (1905–2000), U.S. Air Force lieutenant general
- Godfrey Mundy (1804–1860), British Army major general
- Pierrepont Mundy (1815–1889), British Army major general
