= Vanaman =

Vanaman is a surname. Notable people with the surname include:

- Arthur W. Vanaman (1892–1987), American major general
- Sean Vanaman (born 1984), American video game designer
