= Thomas Smith (cornerback) =

American football player (born 1970)

No. 28, 25, 21
- Position: Cornerback

Personal information
- Born: December 5, 1970 (age 55); Gates, North Carolina, U.S.
- Listed height: 5 ft 11 in (1.80 m)
- Listed weight: 188 lb (85 kg)

Career information
- High school: Gates County (Gatesville, North Carolina)
- College: North Carolina (1989–1992)
- NFL draft: 1993: 1st round, 28th overall pick

Career history
- Buffalo Bills (1993–1999); Chicago Bears (2000); Indianapolis Colts (2001)

Career NFL statistics
- Tackles: 347
- Interceptions: 6
- Forced fumbles: 3
- Stats at Pro Football Reference

Thomas Lee Smith (born December 5, 1970) is an American former professional football player who was a defensive back in the National Football League (NFL) who played for the Buffalo Bills, Chicago Bears, and Indianapolis Colts. He played college football at the University of North Carolina.

After being selected 28th overall in the first round of the 1993 NFL draft, Smith played primarily on special teams during the 1993 season. He played in Super Bowl XXVIII for the Bills against the Dallas Cowboys. He became a starting cornerback for Buffalo in 1994, a position he would hold through the 1999 season. During this time, Smith became known as one of the top coverage cornerbacks in the NFL, but did not receive the Pro Bowl and/or All-Pro recognition his play deserved because of a lack of interceptions (at the time, advanced coverage statistics which would have benefited superb lockdown players like Smith did not exist, and his lack of interceptions was wrongly cited when he was seen as a good rather than great player). He left Buffalo following 1999 to sign with the Chicago Bears, where he played in 2000. He finished his playing career with the Indianapolis Colts in 2001.
