= Cheryl Stallings =

American politician from North Carolina (born 1953)

Member of the Wake County Board of Commissioners from the 3rd district
- Incumbent
- Assumed office December 5, 2022
- Preceded by: Maria Cervania

Member of the Apex Town Council
- In office December 3, 2019 – December 4, 2022
- Preceded by: Bill Jensen; Wesley Moyer
- Succeeded by: Arno Zegerman

Personal details
- Born: Suffolk, Virginia, U.S.
- Spouse: Mark Crampton
- Education: Gates County High School
- Alma mater: North Carolina State University (BA, PhD); East Carolina University (MA)
- Website: www.cheryl4wake.org

Cheryl F. Stallings is an American politician who serves on the Wake County Board of Commissioners, representing district 3 based in Apex, North Carolina. Elected in 2022, her current term ends in December 2026. She previously served on the Apex Town Council from 2019 to 2022.

== Early life and education ==
Cheryl Stallings was born in Suffolk, Virginia. She attained her high school diploma from Gates County High School, followed by a bachelor's degree in psychology from North Carolina State University in 1987. Subsequently, she pursued a master's degree, also in psychology, from East Carolina University in 1990 and earned her Ph.D. in psychology with educational administration minor from NC State University in 1999. She is Baptist.

== Career ==
Stallings is a psychologist. She holds memberships from the North Carolina Psychological Association and the North Carolina Division of Independent Professional Practice. She is also the co-owner of a Raleigh-based child, family and adolescent psychology practice since 2000.

=== Electoral history ===
==== 2022 ====
Wake County Board of Commissioners 3rd district general election, 2022
Party	Candidate	Votes	%
Democratic	Cheryl Stallings	273,430	61.48%
Republican	Irina Comer	171,296	38.52%
Total votes		444,726	100%
Democratic hold			

Wake County Board of Commissioners 3rd district Democratic primary election, 2022
Party	Candidate	Votes	%
Democratic	Cheryl Stallings	31,237	37.01%
Democratic	Cynthia (Cindy) Sinkez	26,666	31.59%
Democratic	Lisa Mead	26,507	31.40%
Total votes		84,410	100%

=== 2019 ===
Apex Town Council election, 2019
Candidate	Votes	%
Terry Mahaffey	3,748	41.19%
Cheryl Stallings	3,701	40.67%
Wesley Moyer (incumbent)	1,559	17.13%
Write-in	85	0.93%
Greg Coley (write-in)	6	0.07%
Total votes	9,099	100%
