= Gates County Senior High School =

American public school in North Carolina

Location
- 88 US-158; Gatesville, North Carolina 27938; United States; 36°26′51″N 76°42′17″W

Information
- Type: Public
- Established: 1962 (64 years ago)
- School district: Gates County Schools
- CEEB code: 341460
- NCES School ID: 370168000720
- Principal: John Hayes
- Teaching staff: 23.21 (FTE)
- Enrollment: 432 (2024–2025)
- Student to teacher ratio: 18.61
- Campus type: Rural
- Colors: Red and white
- Nickname: Red Barons
- Website: gchs.coserver.gates.k12.nc.us

Gates County Senior High School (often just called Gates County High School) is a public, co-educational secondary school located in Gatesville, North Carolina. It is the only high school in the Gates County Schools system.

== History ==
The school was opened in 1962, after the consolidation of the former Gatesville High School and Sunbury High School.

== School information ==
For the 2010–2011 school year, Gates County Senior High School had a total population of 590 students and 47.00 teachers on a (FTE) basis. The student population had a gender ratio of 51.86% male to 48.14% female. The demographic group makeup of the student population was: White, 57.46%; Hispanic, 1.02%; Black, 39.15%; Asian/Pacific Islander, 0.34%; and American Indian, 0.17% (two or more races, 1.86%). For the same school year, 43.22% of the students received free or reduced-cost lunches.

== Academics ==
High School was ranked as a Bronze Level school by the U.S. News & World Report.

== Athletics ==
Gates County Senior High is a member of the North Carolina High School Athletic Association (NCHSAA). The school's mascot is the "Red Barons." The school colors are red and white.

== Notable alumni ==
- Jessie Britt, NFL wide receiver
- Thomas Smith, NFL cornerback
- Cheryl Stallings, member of the Wake County Board of Commissioners from the 3rd district
