= Charles W. Green =

American teacher of agriculture (c.1849–1926)

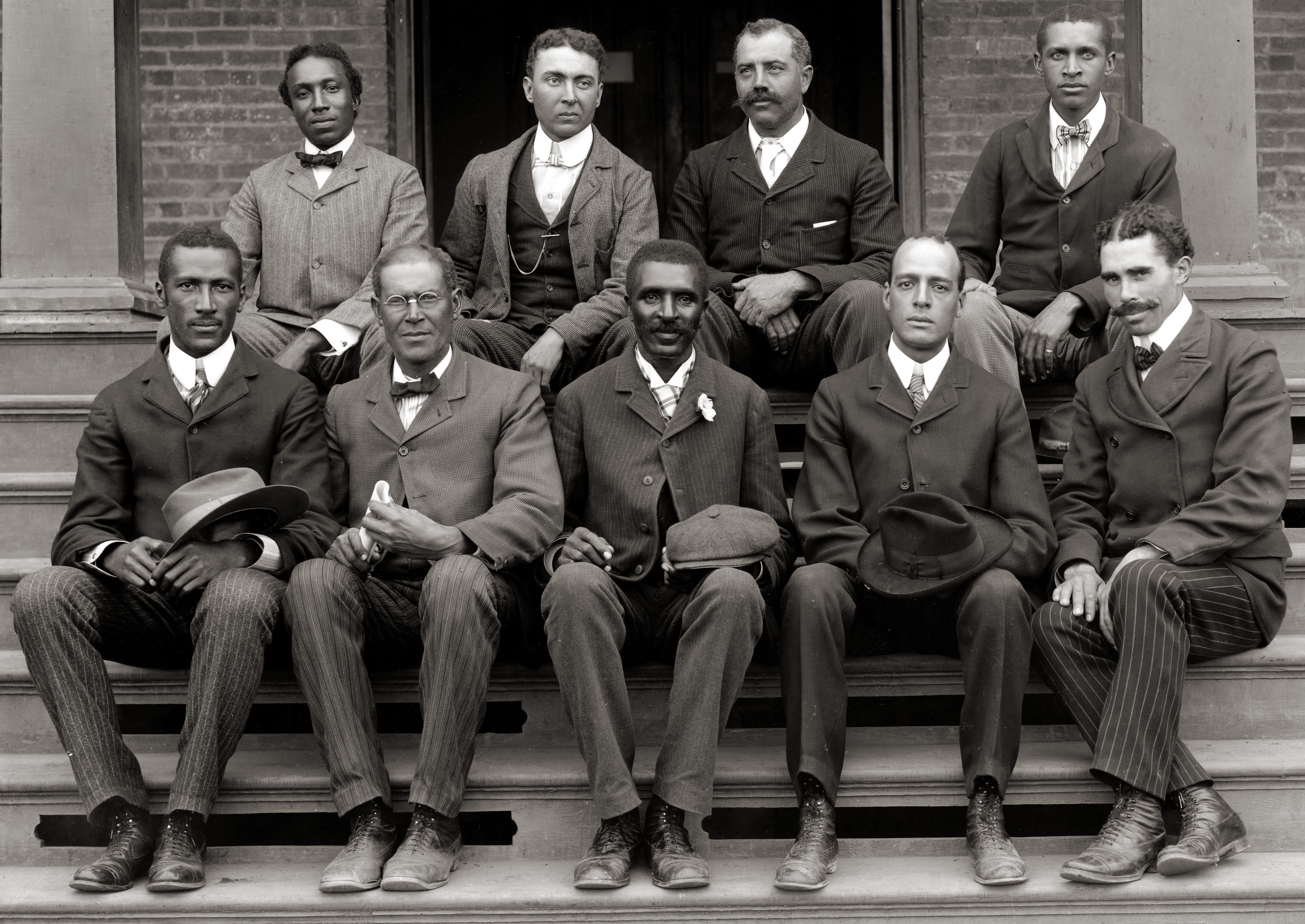
- Greene in bowtie next to George Washington Carver (bottom row second from left)
- Born: c. 1849; Gatesville, North Carolina, U.S.
- Died: 1926
- Resting place: Tuskegee University Cemetery, Tuskegee, Alabama, U.S.
- Other names: C. W. Green, Charles Walter Greene, Charles Wallace Greene, Charles Wallace Green
- Education: Hampton Institute
- Spouse: Lottie Young
- Scientific career
- Fields: Agriculture, real estate development
- Institutions: Tuskegee Institute

Charles W. Green (c. 1849–1926) was an American teacher, and planter. He was the first credentialed teacher of agriculture at Tuskegee Institute (now Tuskegee University) and the second leader of the agriculture department at Tuskegee. He was a graduate of Hampton Institute and classmate of Booker T. Washington. He took over as Tuskegee Institute's farm manager in June 1888. The school had mostly trained teachers up until then. George Washington Carver was recruited to the agriculture faculty in 1896. He was also known as Charles Walter Greene, Charles Wallace Greene, and Charles Wallace Green.

== Life and career ==
Greene was born in Gatesville, North Carolina in about 1849. Although several years older, Greene was a classmate, friend, and roommate of Booker T. Washington at Hampton Institute for all three of their years as students. Each had a prominent role in the program for their graduation in 1875.

Greene came to work at Tuskegee Institute in June, 1888. He went out to rural areas to teach farmers about newly identified and other improved agricultural practices, preceding the development of extension services for Black farmers.

Before the turn of the century, Washington instructed Greene to acquire property to develop a village area that would be entirely owned and operated by "Negroes" and demonstrate their capability and establish economic independence. The district was formally designated in 1901 and named Greenwood, or Greenwood Village, entirely apart from the school. Following Washington's 1905 visit to Arkansas, Indian Territory and Oklahoma, and his speech in Tulsa suggesting the Tuskegee Greenwood District as an example of what he was recommending, Tulsa named its Negro-owned district Greenwood in 1906.

In 1910, Greene accompanied Washington on his visit to North Carolina (one of five such public tours - surveys Washington made from 1908 to 1912 to southern states and Texas), to encourage economic development, independence, self-help, and race pride. In 1940, a plaque at Tuskegee Institute was unveiled to commemorate Greene's service.

He wore a bowtie and glasses. William James Edwards was one of his students. William Henry Holtzclaw also studied under him before moving on to the printing department. Martin A. Menafee also worked on the farm. George Washington Carver was recruited to work in the Tuskegee Agriculture Department in 1896.
