= Jessie Britt =

American football player (born 1963)

No. 88
- Position: Wide receiver

Personal information
- Born: March 3, 1963 (age 63); Suffolk, Virginia, U.S.
- Listed height: 6 ft 4 in (1.93 m)
- Listed weight: 198 lb (90 kg)

Career information
- High school: Gates County (Gatesville, North Carolina)
- College: North Carolina A&T (1982–1985)
- NFL draft: 1986: undrafted

Career history
- Pittsburgh Steelers (1986)
- Stats at Pro Football Reference

Jessie Loftin Britt Jr. (born March 3, 1963) is an American former professional football wide receiver who played one season with the Pittsburgh Steelers of the National Football League (NFL). He played college football for the North Carolina A&T Aggies

== Early life and college ==
Jessie Loftin Britt Jr. was born on March 3, 1963, in Suffolk, Virginia. He attended Gates County Senior High School in Gatesville, North Carolina.

Britt was a four-year letterman for the North Carolina A&T Aggies of North Carolina A&T State University from 1982 to 1985.

== Professional career ==
After going undrafted in the 1986 NFL draft, Britt signed with the Pittsburgh Steelers on May 1, 1986. He played in eight games for the Steelers during the 1986 season. He was targeted twice but did not catch any passes. Britt was placed on injured reserve on November 7, 1986, and was released in 1987.

== Personal life ==
Britt was a police officer in Greensboro, North Carolina, for a few years after his football career. He then moved to Charlotte and was a youth sports coach for five years. Britt moved back to Greensboro in 2000 and started a church there.
