= Andrew Jackson Stedman =

American horticulturalist (1828–1884)

Andrew Jackson Stedman (1828–1884) was an American journalist, lawyer, and horticulturalist who established the apple industry in Patrick County, Virginia. He was born in Gatesville, North Carolina, the son of a wealthy planter and slaveowner who served five terms in the North Carolina House of Commons. He founded a literary magazine, a weekly newspaper and the first newspaper ever published in Patrick County, Virginia. He was also an ordained Baptist minister and accomplished horticulturist, establishing the apple industry in Patrick County, Virginia.

== Early life ==
Andrew Jackson Stedman was born in Gatesville, North Carolina, the son of William Winship Stedman Sr. and Rebecca Walton. His father was a wealthy planter and slaveowner in Gates County and represented Gates County in the North Carolina House of Commons for five terms from 1823 to 1831. Little is known about Andrew's education. Some secondary sources say he graduated from the University of North Carolina but that has not been verified by credible sources. In 1856, at the age of 28, he served as a Presidential elector on the Millard Fillmore ticket.

== Career ==
=== Publisher ===
His first attempt at publishing was Stedman's Salem Magazine in January 1858. It was conceived as a southern literary magazine along the lines of the Southern Literary Messenger that had been so successful. (Its publisher, Thomas Willis White was his great-uncle through marriage.) He managed to publish one issue in Salem and another in Raleigh, under the name Stedman Magazine in May 1858 before folding. After Stedman Magazine folded, he immediately attempted to launch a mouthful, The Southern Confederacy and Cape Fear and Deep River Advertiser. It too was destined to fail. The paper apparently never published a single issue.

His third attempt, was a weekly newspaper named The Old Constitution published in Danbury, North Carolina. He also published a forty-page pamphlet titled Murder & Mystery: History of the Life and Death of John W. Stephens [11], State Senator of North Carolina, From Caswell County. The pamphlet examined the assassination of North Carolina state Senator John W. Stephens. After moving to Patrick County, his wife's birth county, he established The Voice of the People, the first newspaper published in Patrick County.

=== Civil War service ===
He enlisted in Company B, 49th North Carolina infantry on March 18, 1862 and was so severely wounded at the Battle of Malvern Hill that he was unable to return to duty. Through the intervention of Governor Zebulon Vance, on October 13, 1862 he was appointed a First Lieutenant and assigned to the newly-formed Confederate Signal Corps. In November, he reported to General Howell Cobb in Georgia and was responsible for signal posts and observation points that sent messages by wire, flag, and torch. He was paroled one month after Appomattox in the general parole.

=== Attorney ===
How Stedman obtained his legal education is not known, but he must have had one, because he served as solicitor of the Fifth District of North Carolina while living in Danbury, North Carolina and, after moving to Virginia, served as a commonwealth attorney. In both states he practiced law, including defending clients in court.

=== Horticulturalist ===
After moving to Virginia, he took an interest in culturing apples. His wife's ancestor, Col. William Martin, was famous for planting the "Old Hardy Apple Tree" in Patrick County in 1790. The family had long taken an interest in growing root stock from that tree, and Stedman adopted the interest wholeheartedly, planting about 150,000 apple trees with his son, Col Malvern Vance Stedman. Virginia ranks 6th in the nation in apple production, and Patrick County has 350 acres in production.

=== Baptist minister ===
He was ordained a Baptist minister August 9, 1873 and preached in the local church regularly.

== Personal life ==
Stedman married Susan Cathleen Staples in Patrick County, Virginia in 1855. They had four children, two sons, and two daughters. Their second son, Colonel Malvern Vance Stedman was a leading businessman, orchardist, and apple producer in Patrick County.
