= Calvin Earl =

American singer

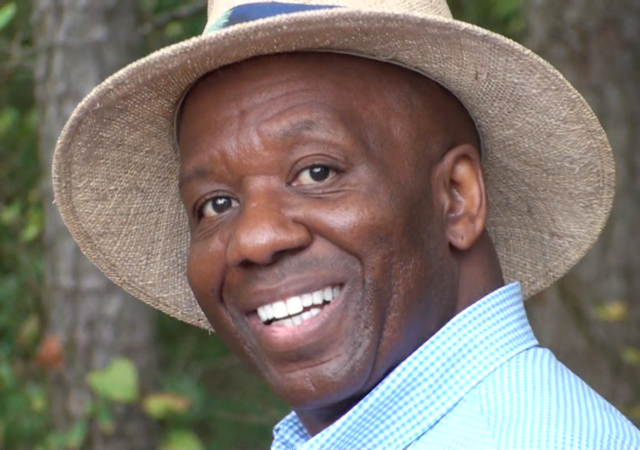
- Calvin Earl

Background information
- Born: Gatesville, North Carolina, U.S.
- Genres: Jazz, R & B, Folk and African American Spirituals
- Occupations: Singer, Guitarist, and Songwriter
- Instruments: Vocals, Acoustic Guitar
- Label: Back to Basics Records
- Website: calvinearl.com

Calvin Earl is an American singer, musician, storyteller and documentary film maker specializing in the history of African American Spirituals. His passion for the preservation of the spirituals led him to lobby for the introduction of twin resolutions (H. Res. 120 and S. Res 69) in the United States Congress in 2007, to honor American slaves for their contribution to the American nation and recognize the African American Spiritual as a National Treasure. He is referred to in the legislation as a “noted performer & educator of the African American Spirituals". Because of his successful efforts in the passage of the legislation, Earl became affectionately known as the "Ambassador of the African American Spirituals". He has recorded two albums of spirituals (for Back to Basics Records), including Gratitude which is sold at American historical sites including Monticello, Mount Vernon, Jamestown, and the Jimmy Carter National Historic Site in Plains, Georgia.

== Early life ==
Calvin Earl was born in a sharecropper cabin on the Glen Lillie Farm in Gatesville, NC. Earl began playing guitar at the age of 7 at his hometown church. A naturally talented musician, he soon began to travel to different churches and school venues in several surrounding counties in North Carolina and Virginia. Considered a musical prodigy at the age of 9, his frequent performances on local Christian radio stations in Virginia and in his home state of North Carolina brought him to the attention of gospel musician Mahalia Jackson. He performed with her and many other gospel singers including The Blind Boys of Alabama, Shirley Caesar, James Cleveland, The Mighty Clouds of Joy, and the Dixie Hummingbirds throughout his childhood and teen years. James Brown wanted to take him on the road as a guitarist for his band, but Earl's parents turned down the offer along with all the other offers for their youngest son.

== Career ==
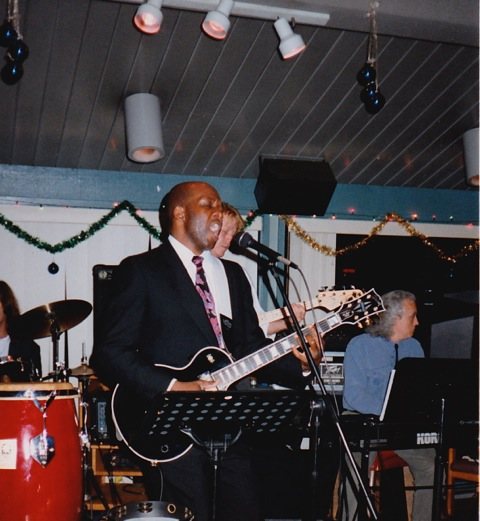

In 1972–1974 while serving stateside in the military (US Army Corps of Engineers, Fort Ord, California) during the Vietnam War, Earl formed a R & B band in 1973 named the "Elements of Peace". The band performed at Military Officer's clubs, nightclubs in the Monterey and San Francisco Bay areas, and at special events. At the end of his military service they disbanded and Earl attended community college on the GI Bill in Monterey, California. In late 1991, he formed another band, "Calvin Earl and His Big Band Sound". In 1991 at the annual Long Beach Blues Festival he was invited to perform with The Blind Boys of Alabama. In the Spring of 1992, he presented his first solo performance at the Unitarian Universalist Fellowship in Ojai, California.

Earl joined several artist rosters at Community Works Theater To Go NYC an organization building community through art and education, Urban Stages an award-winning Off Broadway production company and NY State Performers & Programs for public libraries. He also joined the New Jersey Council for the Humanities – Horizons Speaker Bureau roster.

In 1999 he debuted his show "The Spirit Behind The Spirituals" at the Children's Storefront School in Harlem.

=== 2007 United States Congressional Historic Twin Resolutions ===
In 2006, Earl asked Senator Robert Menendez to introduce legislation on the Senate floor to honor the American slaves for their contributions to the American nation, and recognize the African American Spiritual as a National Treasure.

Earl managed to persuade Congresswoman Rosa DeLauro to sponsor the twin resolution, while other co-sponsors included Congresswoman Carolyn Maloney (NY), Congressman Danny K. Davis (IL) and Congressman John Lewis (GA). He also enlisted the help of scholars including Dr. Henry Louis Gates Jr – Harvard University, Dr. Cornel West – Princeton University, Dr Clement Price – Rudgers University, Dr. Dorothy I. Height (1912–2010)- former Chair & President Emerita National Council of Negro Women and the NAACP. On February 7, 2007, the House passed H. Res 120, and on February 17, 2007, the Senate passed S. Res 69.

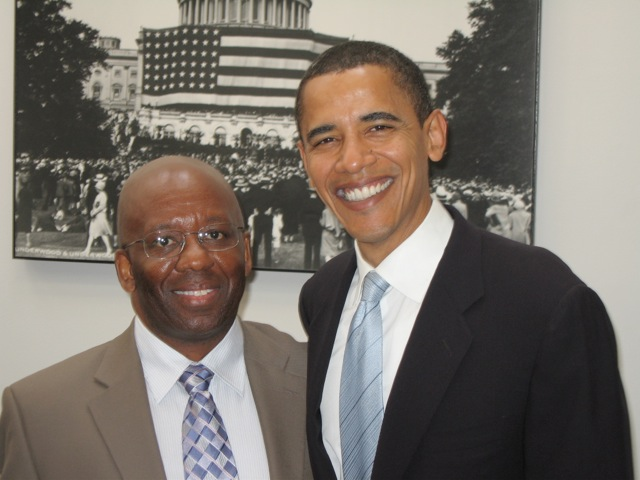
President Barack Obama

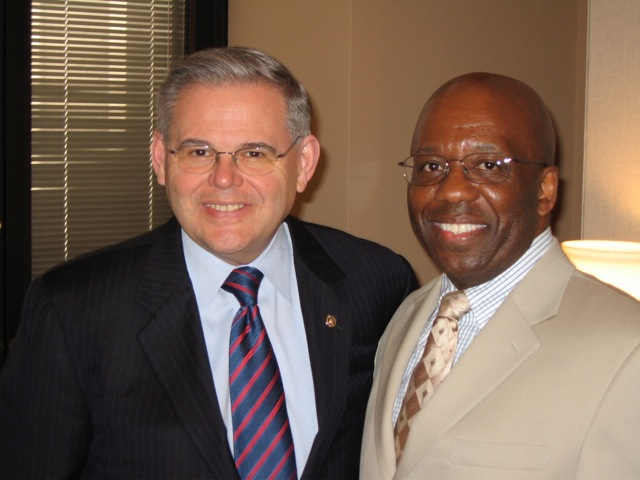
Senator Robert Menendez

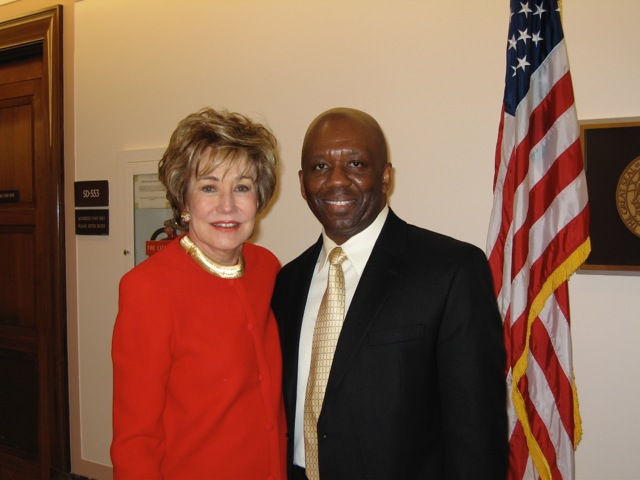
Senator Elizabeth Dole

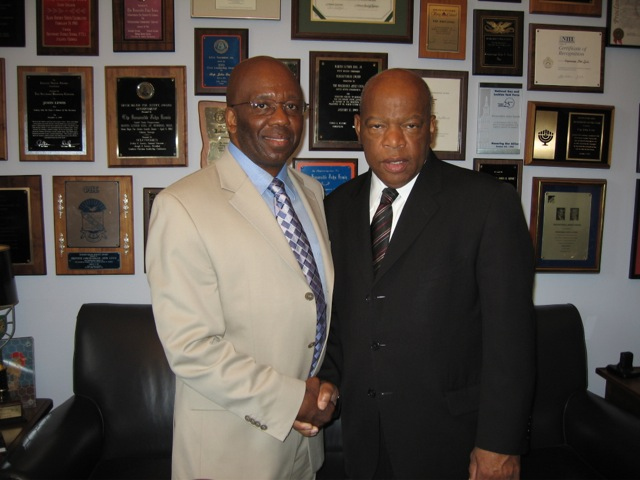
Congressman John Lewis

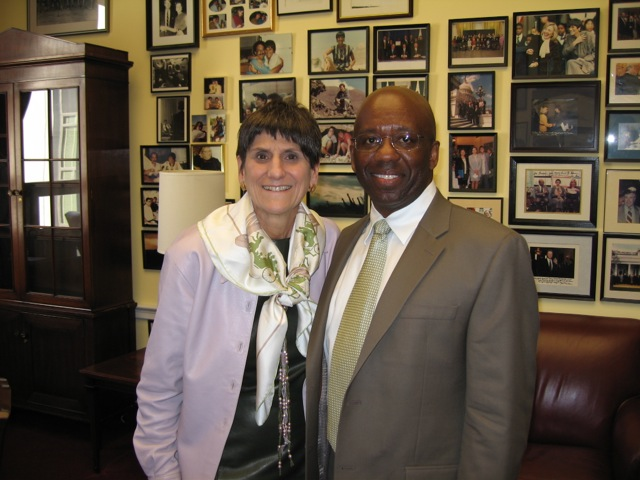
Congresswoman Rosa DeLauro

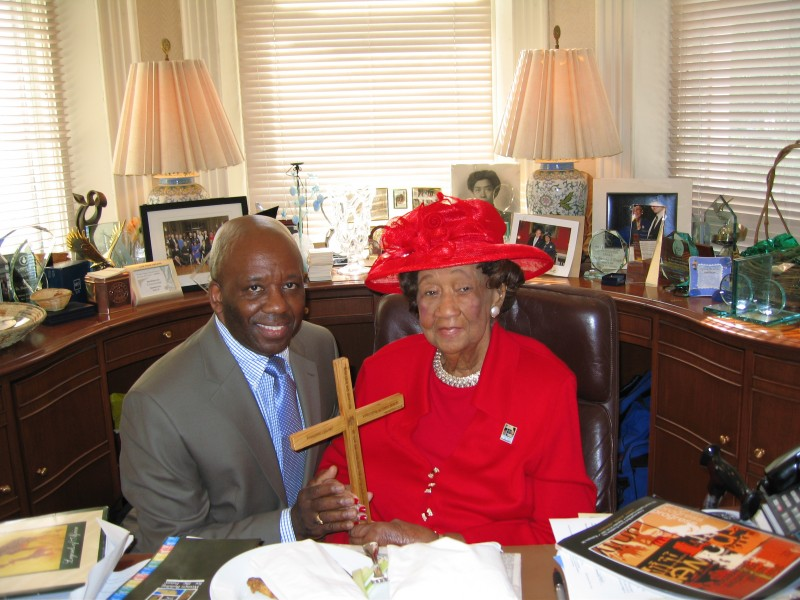
Dr. Dorothy I. Height

== Honors and awards ==
- 2006 – United States Senate Certificate of Appreciation for "distinctive service to our nation and the State of New Jersey”
- 2008 – George W. Bush – Presidential Proclamation – "celebrating the extraordinary talents and creativity of African-American singers, musicians and composers whose achievements have enriched our culture and enhances our lives.”
- 2000 – Certificate of Appreciation Sisulu Children's Academy
- 2003 – Certificate of Appreciation Upward Bound Program, Salem State University
- 2012 – The Negro Spirituals Heritage Keeper Award, Friend of the Negro Spirituals, San Francisco CA
