= Freeman-Hurt House =

Historic house in Georgia, United States

- U.S. National Register of Historic Places
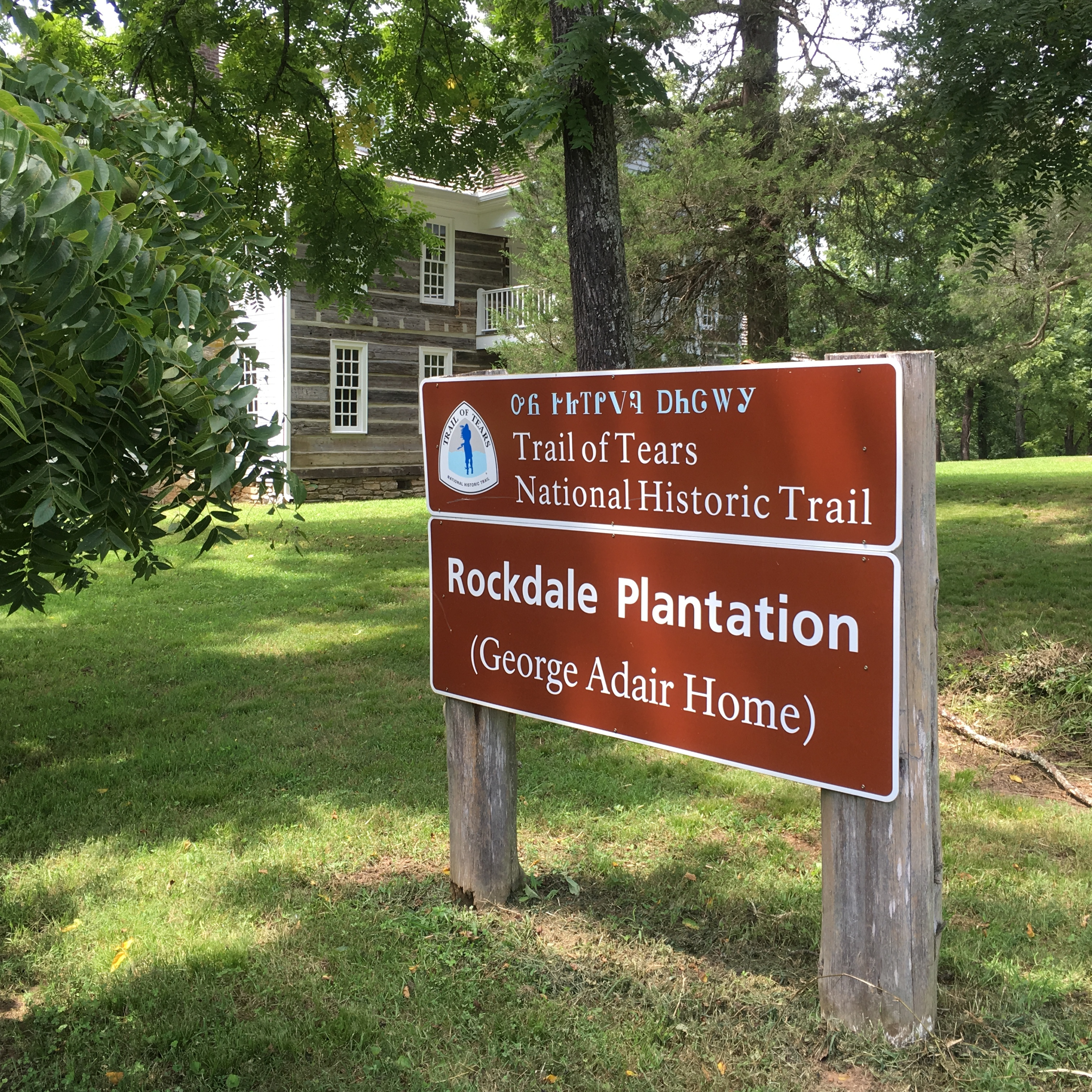
- NTIR sign at the Rockdale Plantation in Fairmount, Georgia.

- Location within Georgia Location within the United States
- Location: On U.S. 411 south of Oakman, Georgia
- Coordinates: 34°33′06″N 84°42′17″W
- Area: 30 acres (12 ha)
- Built: 1832
- Built by: Swann, Burdine; Wickett, Joe
- Architectural style: Dogtrot
- NRHP reference No.: 76000636
- Added to NRHP: January 1, 1976

The Freeman-Hurt House near Oakman, Georgia is listed on the National Register of Historic Places. The property includes five contributing buildings. It includes dogtrot architecture.

The house was built by a Cherokee named Burdine Swann, according to a direct descendant, and the house was built before 1832.
