= Eure-Roberts House =

Historic house in North Carolina, United States

- U.S. National Register of Historic Places
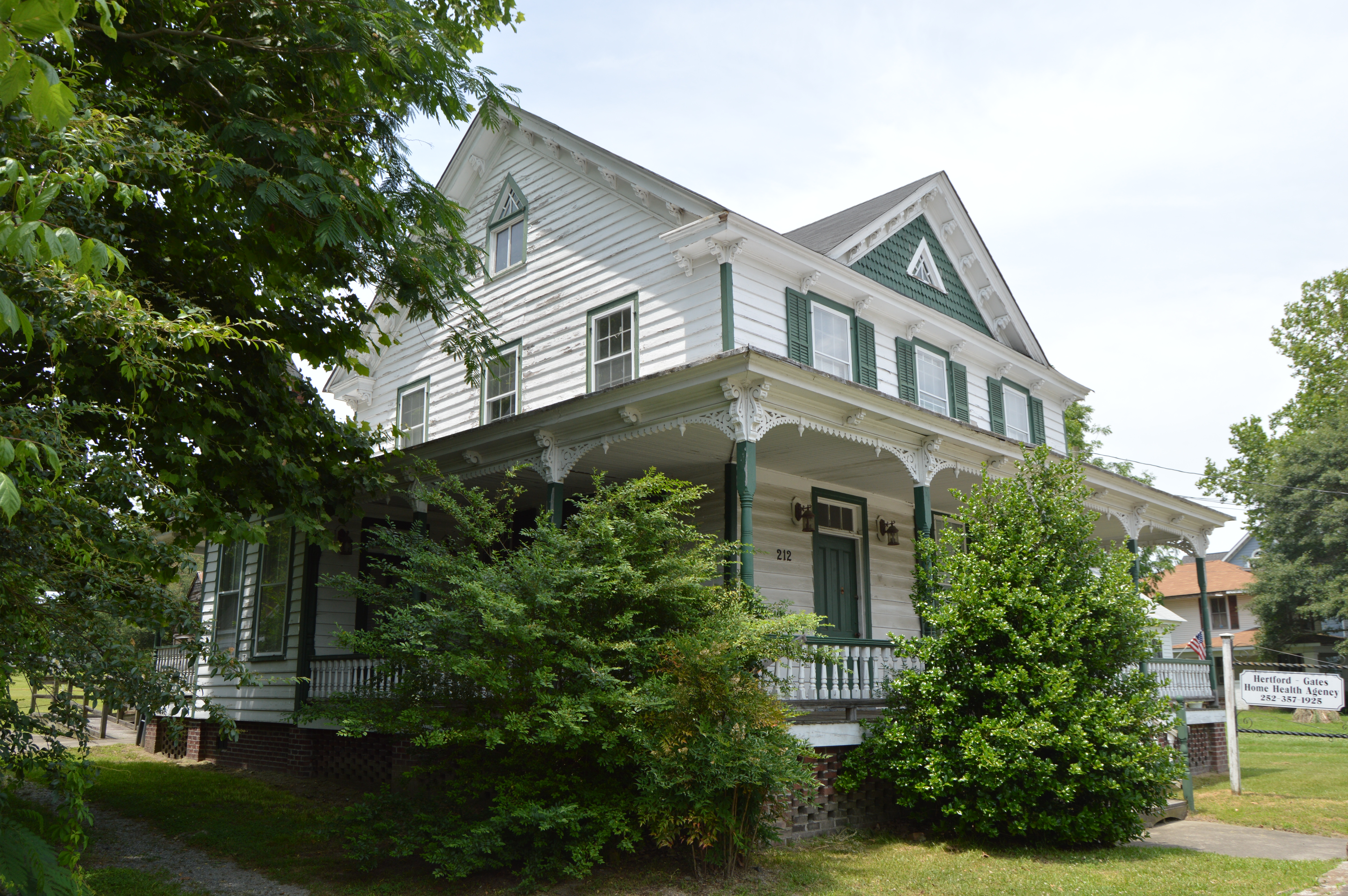
- Front and southern side

- Location within North Carolina Location within the United States
- Location: 212 W. Main St., Gatesville, North Carolina
- Coordinates: 36°24′23″N 76°45′9″W
- Area: less than one acre
- Built: c. 1850, c. 1901
- Architectural style: Queen Anne
- NRHP reference No.: 06000868
- Added to NRHP: September 20, 2006

Eure-Roberts House is a historic home located at Gatesville, Gates County, North Carolina. It was built about 1850, and is a large two-story, side-gable frame dwelling. It was remodeled about 1901 to add a Queen Anne wraparound porch. Also on the property is a one-story, side-gable heavy braced-frame smokehouse built about 1850.

It was listed on the National Register of Historic Places in 2006.
