= Rountree Family Farm =

Historic farm in North Carolina, United States

- U.S. National Register of Historic Places
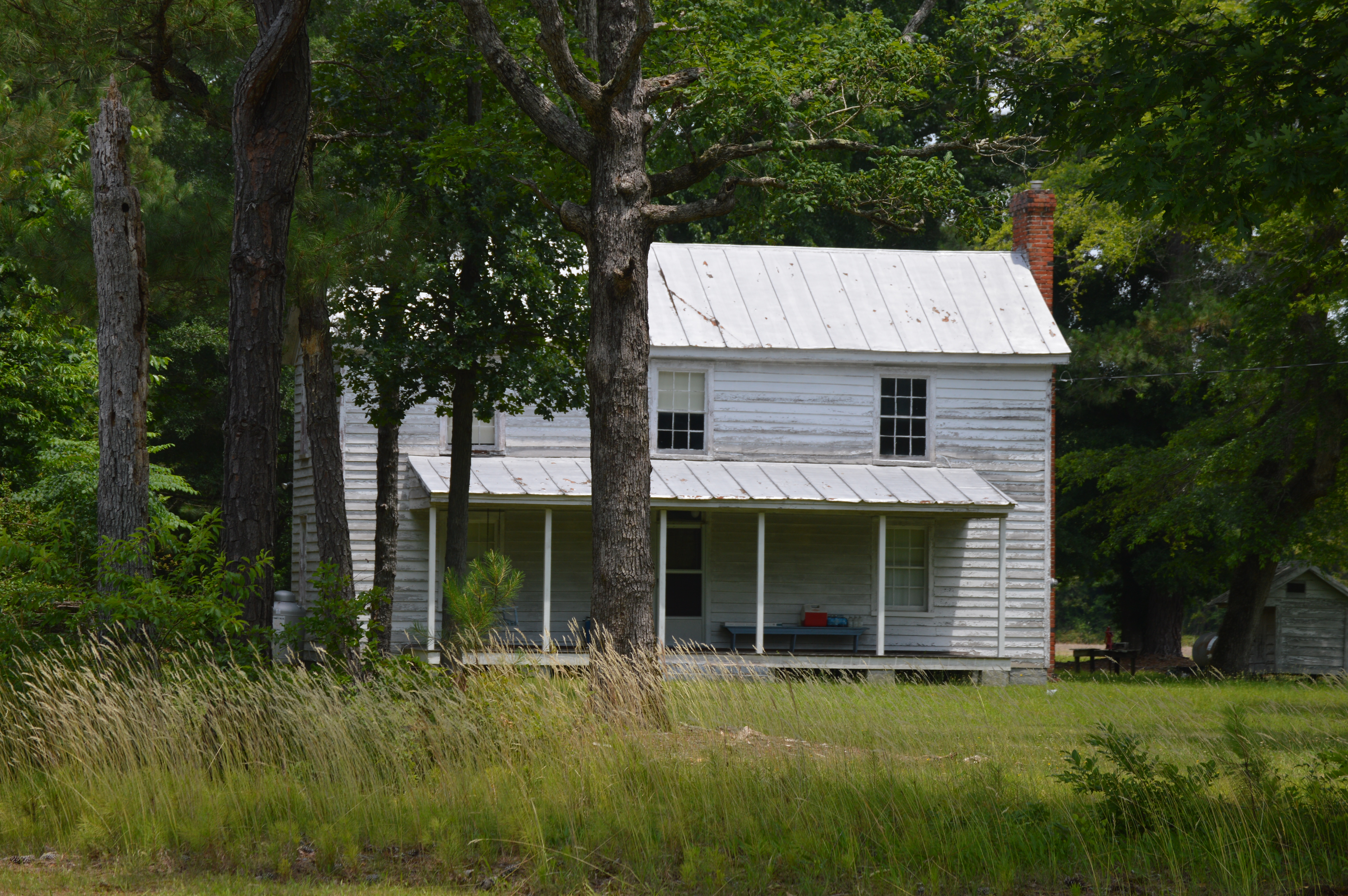
- Front

- Location within North Carolina Location within the United States
- Location: 049 NC 37 N, near Gatesville, North Carolina
- Coordinates: 36°26′31″N 76°45′19″W
- Area: 87.3 acres (35.3 ha)
- Built: c. 1830
- Built by: Tom Beamon, Charles Hayes
- Architectural style: Federal, I-house
- NRHP reference No.: 00000881
- Added to NRHP: August 2, 2000

Rountree Family Farm, also known as the Alfred Patrick Rountree Farm, is a historic farm complex located near Gatesville, Gates County, North Carolina. The property consists of the property, buildings and outbuildings constructed by four generations of the descendants of Abner Rountree who acquired the family's original holding here in 1800. The Simmons Rountree House was built about 1830, and is a two-story, one-room plan frame house. It has not been occupied as a residence since 1907. The Alfred Patrick Rountree House was built in 1904 and expanded about 1916. It is a two-story frame farmhouse sheathed in weatherboard. Also on the property are the contributing dairy (c. 1904-1915), hand-pump (c. 1910-1915), wood shed (c. 1910-1920), smokehouse (c. 1904), privy (c. 1904-1915), three barns (c. 1904, 1933, c. 1910-1915), stable (c. 1935), and chicken coop (c. 1925).

It was listed on the National Register of Historic Places in 2000. The property was originally owned by the Spivey family. It is noted on the application for historic places that the Spivey occupation of the residence was well before the 1800s. The date the Rountree's took the property happened when Priscilla Spivey conveyed 140 acres to her son-in-law Abner Rountree. [PDF]AL' SHPD - North Carolina State Historic Preservation Office. The original owner Spivey preferred exploration and breaking the laws of the English Crown regarding further exploration, to farm and plantation life. The Spivey family traveled and explored.

Spivey Ancestors – Colonists, Pioneers, Patriots. Hiram Calvin Spivey and Annis Isaacs form but one connection among an extended family of long hunters,

The property was greatly expanded once Abner took over. His expansion came from segments purchased from the neighboring farm/plantation owned by Nathan Riddick. A great amount of history is available on the Rountree family from a sight named Sally's Family Place.
