= Arthur W. Vanaman =

US Air Force General

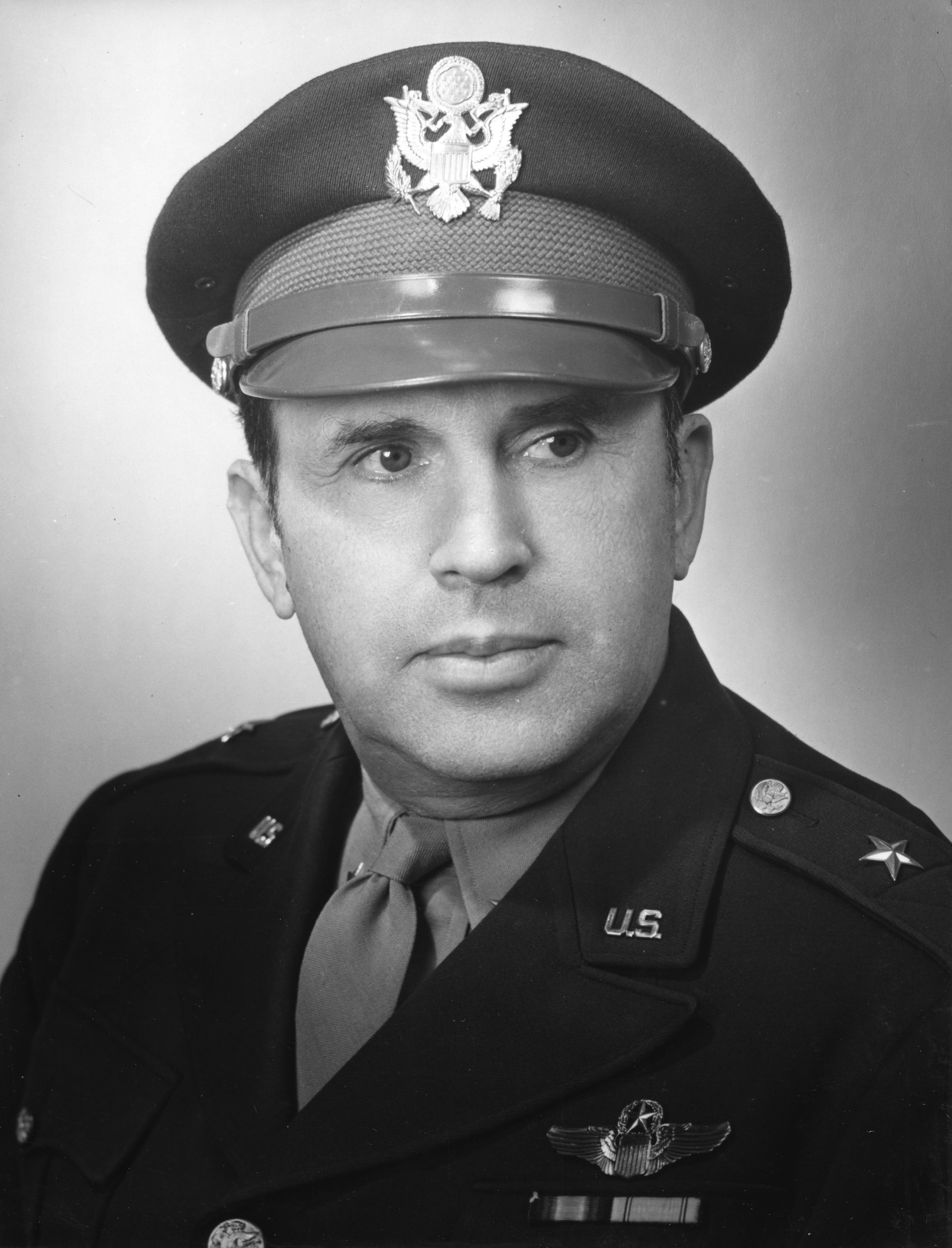
- Vanaman in the 1940s
- Born: May 9, 1892; Millville, New Jersey
- Died: September 14, 1987 (aged 95)
- Military career
- Allegiance: United States
- Branch: United States Army (1920–1947); United States Army Air Service (1920–1926); United States Army Air Corps (1926–1941); United States Army Air Forces (1941–1947); United States Air Force (1947–1954)
- Service years: 1920–1954
- Rank: Major General
- Conflicts: World War II
- Awards: Distinguished Service Medal; Legion of Merit (2x); Bronze Star Medal; Croix de guerre (Belgium)

Arthur William Vanaman (May 9, 1892 – September 14, 1987) was an American major general who served in the United States Air Corps and Air Force from 1920 until 1954. During the Second World War, he served as Chief of Staff for Intelligence for the Eighth Air Force. In June 1944, he was captured by the Germans, becoming the highest-ranked American POW in the European Theater of the Second World War.

== Early life and family ==
Vanaman was born in Millville, New Jersey on May 9, 1892. He graduated from Drexel Institute of Technology in 1915 and studied aeronautical engineering at the Massachusetts Institute of Technology in 1918. That same year, he married Blanche Garroway, with whom he had two children.

== Air Force ==
Vanaman was commissioned a first lieutenant in the US Army Air Service on July 1, 1920. Through the 1920s and 1930s, he advanced through the ranks as a procurement and engineering officer. In 1937, he graduated from the Army War College. Soon after, he was appointed as an attaché to Berlin. In August 1941, Vanaman returned to the United States to take a post as Secretary of the Air Staff in Washington, D.C. By 1944, Vanaman had attained the rank of Brigadier General and was serving as Chief of Intelligence for the Eighth Air Force in England, under the command of Lt. Gen. Jimmy Doolittle. In this role, he was privy to many of the Allies' most highly classified programs, including Ultra.

While in Berlin Vanaman had an affair with a German journalist, Katrin Janecke. Between 1941 and 1945 Janecke kept a diary in English addressed to 'Van', and once visited him while he was a prisoner of war. Despite Janecke's hopes that he would divorce his wife and marry her, Vanaman did not renew contact with Janecke after the war. The diary survives in the archives of Amherst College, Massachusetts.

== Capture and imprisonment ==
On June 27, 1944, Vanaman went on a routine bombing mission as an observer. His B-17 was hit by flak and caught fire, causing the pilot to order the crew to bail out. Vanaman and four other airmen jumped, landing in the French countryside between Contay and Puisieux on the Somme. The rest of the crew stayed in the plane and returned safely to England once the fire went out. The four airmen were able to evade capture, but Vanaman, who had been injured in the jump, was immediately captured by the Germans. He became one of the highest-ranked American POWs of the Second World War. Despite his fear that he'd be interrogated and give up the classified information he'd been entrusted with, the Germans never questioned him. During his captivity at night he covered his mouth with a bandage in case he talked in his sleep.

Vanaman was imprisoned at Stalag Luft III. In 1945, Nazi officials separated Vanaman and Colonel Delmar T. Spivey from the other prisoners and brought them to Berlin in an attempt to conduct clandestine peace negotiations.

== Later career ==
Vanaman remained with the Air Force until retiring in 1954 with the rank of Major General.

During his career, Vanaman was awarded the Distinguished Service Medal, the Bronze Star, and the Belgian Croix de Guerre with Palms.

He died on September 14, 1987.
