= Oakman, Georgia =

Unincorporated community in Georgia, United States

Coordinates: 34°33′59″N 84°42′30″W

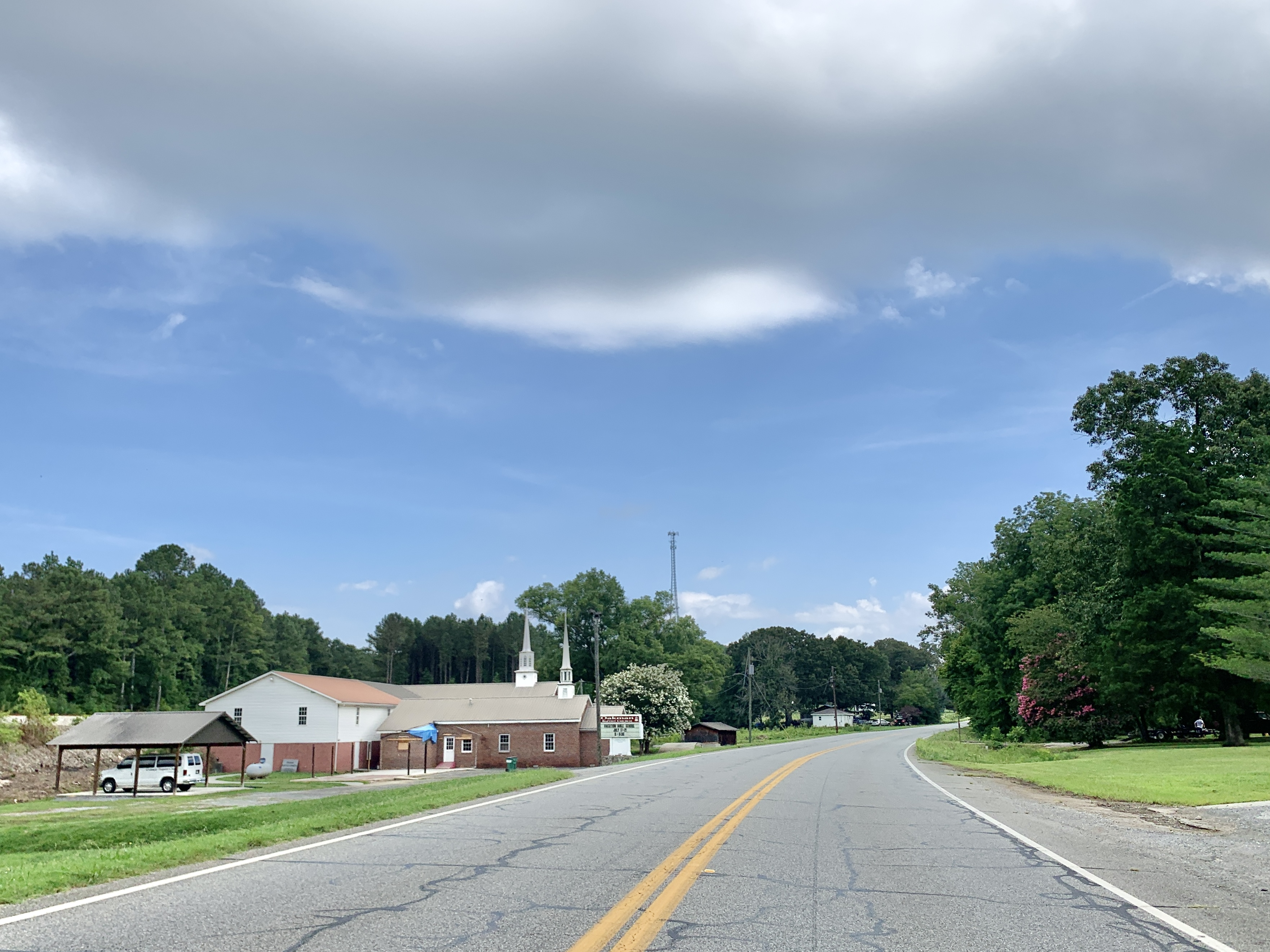
Oakman, Georgia

Oakman is an unincorporated community in Gordon County, in the U.S. state of Georgia.

== History ==
A post office called Oakman has been in operation since 1908. The community was named for the "oak man", the nickname of a local lumber dealer. The Georgia General Assembly incorporated Oakman in 1939; the town's municipal charter was repealed in 1995.

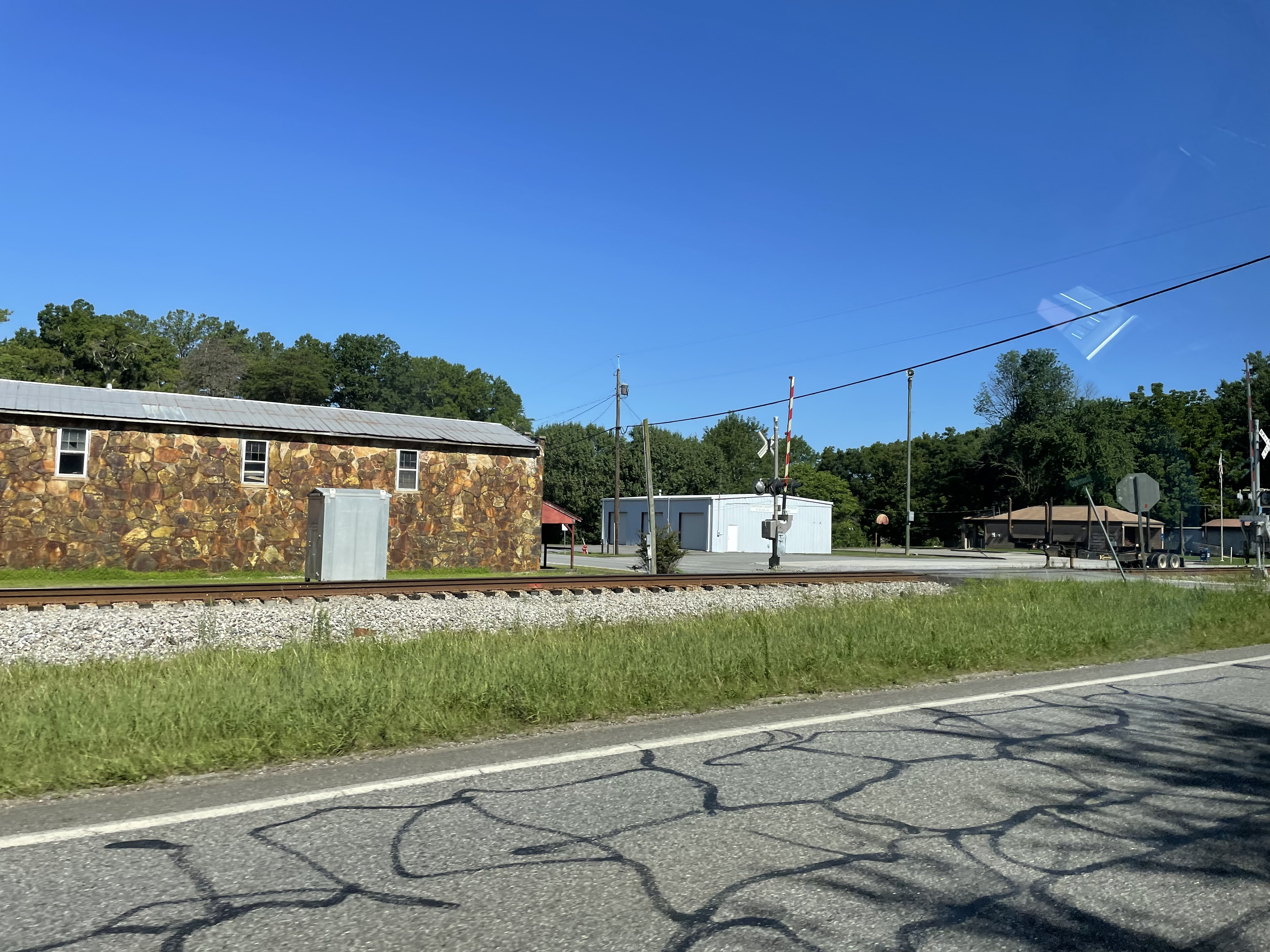
Oakman Post Office
