= Cottage–Freeman Historic District =

Historic district in Massachusetts, United States

- U.S. National Register of Historic Places
- U.S. Historic district
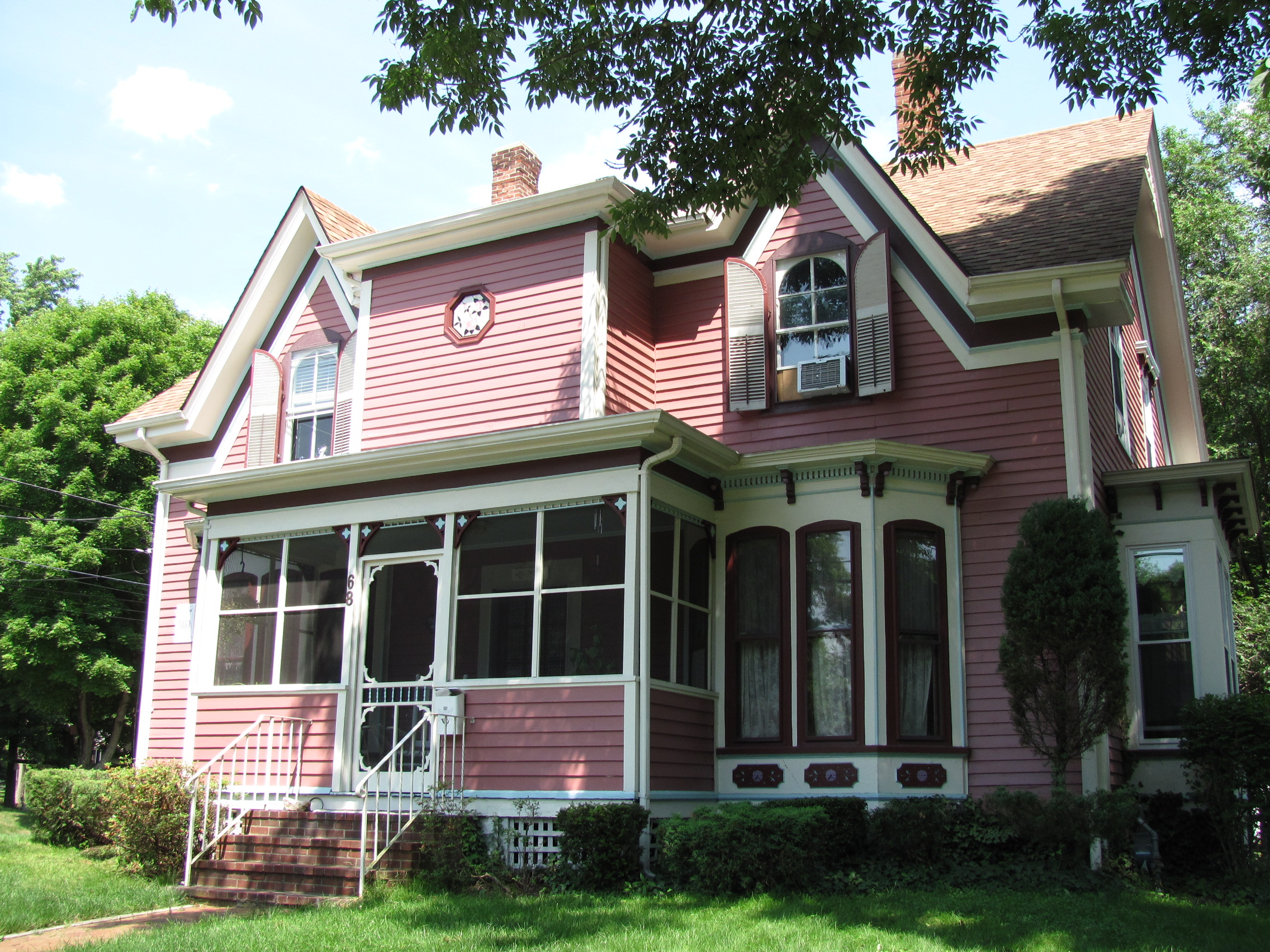
- Henry E. and Abigail Arnold House

- Location within Massachusetts Location within the United States
- Location: North Attleborough, Massachusetts
- Coordinates: 41°58′3″N 71°18′38″W
- Area: 11 acres (4.5 ha)
- NRHP reference No.: 03001263
- Added to NRHP: December 12, 2003

The Cottage–Freeman Historic District is a historic district on Cottage St. Freeman St., from Commonwealth Ave. to Ten Mile River and Park Lane in North Attleborough, Massachusetts. It encompasses a densely populated neighborhood which was developed predominantly in the two decades beginning c. 1890, built to house workers in the area's jewelry industry. Most of it consists of vernacular architecture of the period, although there are some houses which date to the early 19th century.

The district was added to the National Register of Historic Places in 2003.

== See also ==
- National Register of Historic Places listings in Bristol County, Massachusetts
