= Gates County Courthouse =

Historic courthouse in North Carolina, US

- U.S. National Register of Historic Places
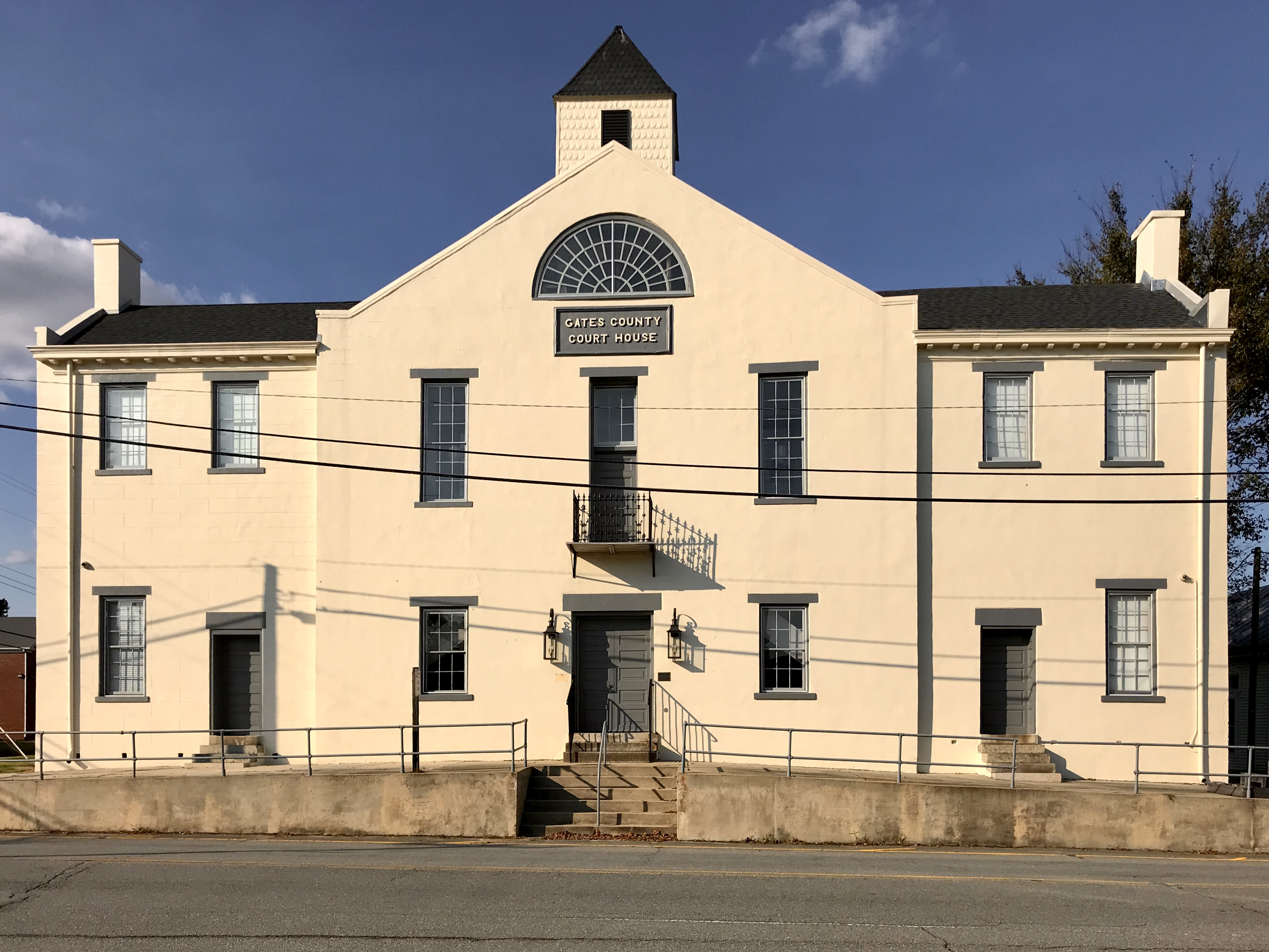

- Location within North Carolina Location within the United States
- Location: Court St., Gatesville, North Carolina
- Coordinates: 36.4035°N 76.7530°W
- Area: less than one acre
- Built: 1836
- Architectural style: Federal
- NRHP reference No.: 76001325
- Added to NRHP: October 22, 1976

Gates County Courthouse is a historic courthouse building located at Gatesville, Gates County, North Carolina. It was built in 1836, and is a two-story, T-shaped, seven-bay, Federal-style brick building. It has a three-bay central projecting entrance pavilion and a delicate cast-iron second floor balcony added in 1904.

It was listed on the National Register of Historic Places in 1976.
