= Reid's Grove School =

Historic school building in North Carolina, United States

- U.S. National Register of Historic Places
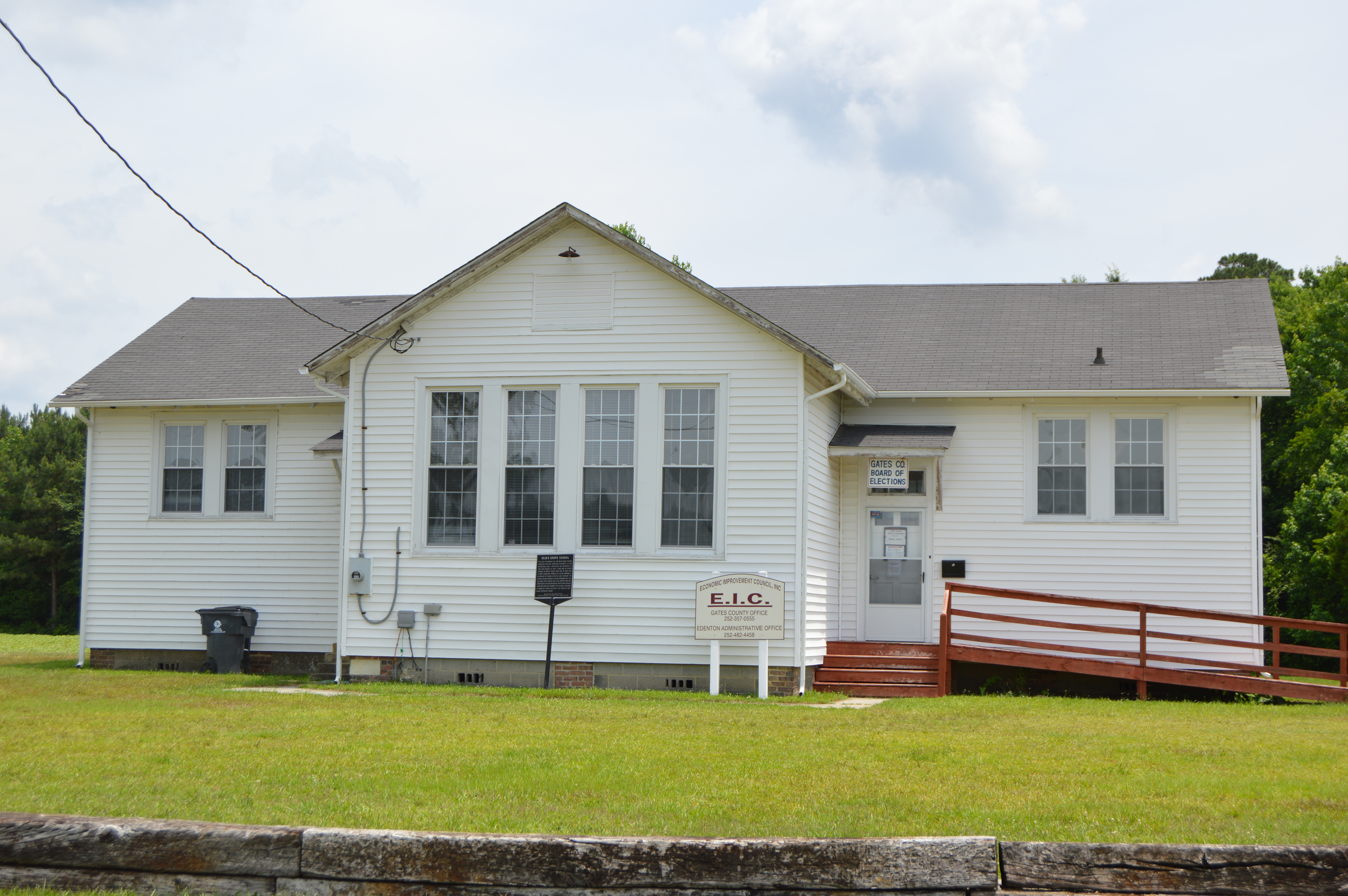
- Front

- Location within North Carolina Location within the United States
- Location: 931 Main St., near Gatesville, North Carolina
- Coordinates: 36°25′4″N 76°45′29″W
- Area: 1.3 acres (0.53 ha)
- Built: 1927
- Built by: S.D. Stallings
- Architectural style: Greek Revival, Federal
- NRHP reference No.: 11000621
- Added to NRHP: August 30, 2011

Reid's Grove School is a historic Rosenwald school located near Gatesville, Gates County, North Carolina. It was built in 1927, and is a one-story, side-gable frame school with a prominent projecting single-bay gabled wing. It was one of seven schools in the county financed and constructed with the assistance of the Rosenwald Fund for the education of African-American children. It replaced an earlier school built in the 1880s. The building ceased its function as a school in 1951.

It was listed on the National Register of Historic Places in 2011.
