= Freeman Farm Historic District =

Historic district in Maine, United States

- U.S. National Register of Historic Places
- U.S. Historic district
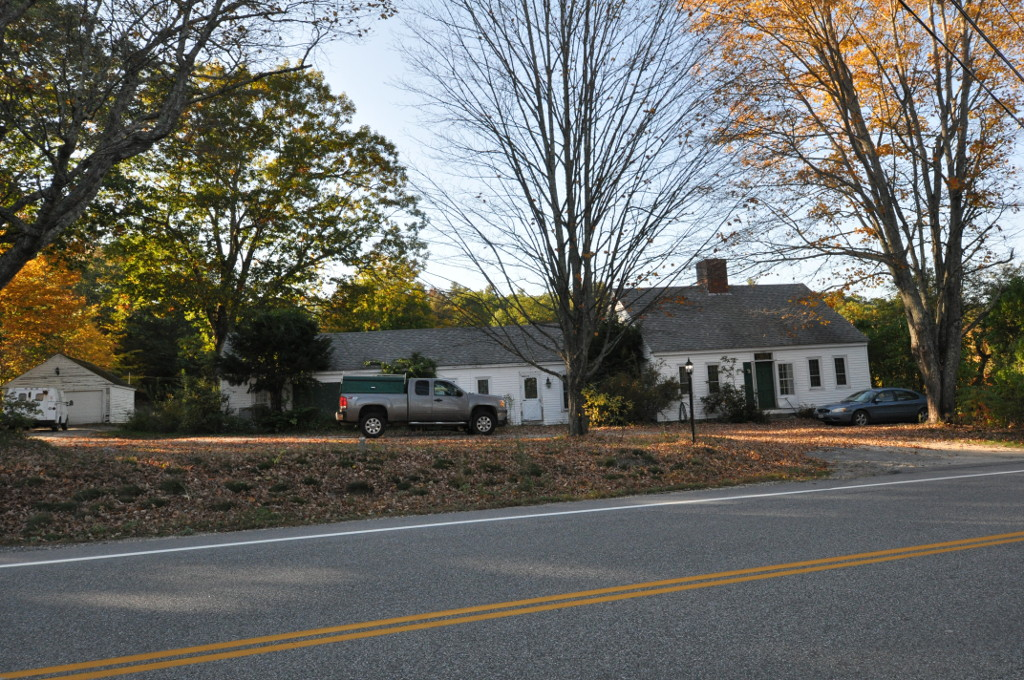

- Location within Maine Location within the United States
- Location: 342 W. Gray Rd., Gray, Maine
- Coordinates: 43°51′18″N 70°23′8″W
- Area: 100 acres (40 ha)
- Built: 1812
- Architectural style: Federal
- NRHP reference No.: 03000621
- Added to NRHP: July 10, 2003

The Freeman Farm Historic District encompasses a historic farm property in Gray, Maine. The 100-acre (40 ha) parcel, originally platted out in 1791, was owned and operated by five generations of the Freeman family, and is emblematic of the changes in agricultural practices over a period of more than 150 years. It was listed on the National Register of Historic Places in 2003.

== Description and history ==
The former Freeman Farm is located in southern Gray, on the west side of West Gray Road (United States Route 202) north of its junction with Maine State Route 115. The property is divided into roughly 12 acres (4.9 ha) of agricultural fields, with the balance of the property in managed forest. The farm complex is set near the road, and includes the main house, a barn, chicken house, and garage. The former family cemetery (its remains reinterred in the town cemetery) lies at the northwest corner of the cultivated lands.

The farmhouse is a 1-1/2 story Cape style wood frame structure, with a central chimney, side gable roof, and long ell extending to the south and west. It was built about 1812 by Jonathan Freeman III, and retains internal finishes and hardware. The barn is a typical New England bank barn of the period, built in the 1830s, and the chicken house was added in the 1880s. The garage is a modern (1960s) addition.

The property was worked by five generations of Freemans. At first, it was probably a subsistence operation, with excess produce sold at local markets. Later in the 19th century, with the arrival of the railroad in the area, George H. Freeman, Jr. apparently began bringing products to markets in Portland. Following his death in 1915, the property was taken over by his son, George L. Freeman. A civic engineer by trade, he operated the property as a gentleman's farm, living there full-time only in retirement. This practice was maintained by his son. The property was sold out of the family after his death in 2000. It is the subject of a preservation easement, held by the Windham Land Trust, that restricts its uses significantly.

== See also ==
- National Register of Historic Places listings in Cumberland County, Maine
