= Clarkson W. Freeman House =

Historic house in Illinois, United States

- U.S. National Register of Historic Places
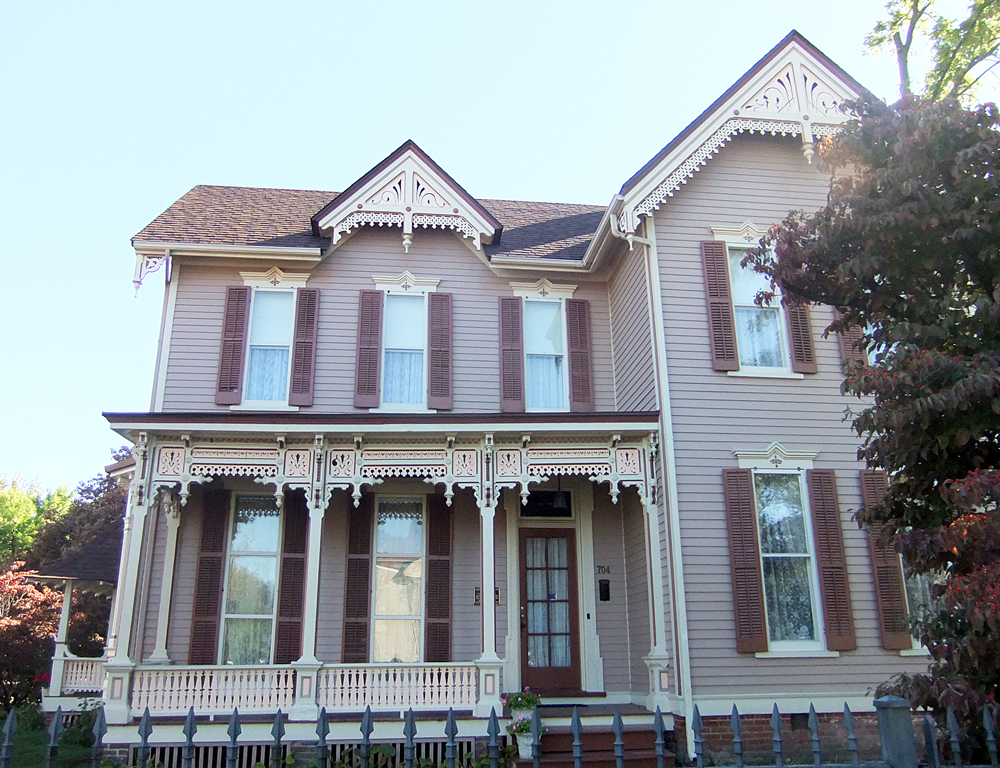

- Location within Illinois Location within the United States
- Location: 704 W. Monroe St., Springfield, Illinois
- Coordinates: 39°47′57″N 89°39′49″W
- Area: less than one acre
- Built: 1878
- Architectural style: Italianate
- NRHP reference No.: 80001411
- Added to NRHP: September 29, 1980

The Clarkson W. Freeman House is a historic house located at 704 West Monroe Street in Springfield, Illinois. The house was built in 1878 for farmer and businessman Clarkson W. Freeman. The two-story house has an Italianate design with an L-shaped plan, an asymmetrical front porch, a bay window and bracketed cornice on the east side, and long, narrow windows with decorative heads. Ornate Carpenter Gothic trim decorates the top of the porch and gables, including the false gable above the porch; no other house in Springfield has trim with the same level of detail.

The house was added to the National Register of Historic Places on September 29, 1980.
