= Elmwood Plantation =

Historic house in North Carolina, United States

- U.S. National Register of Historic Places
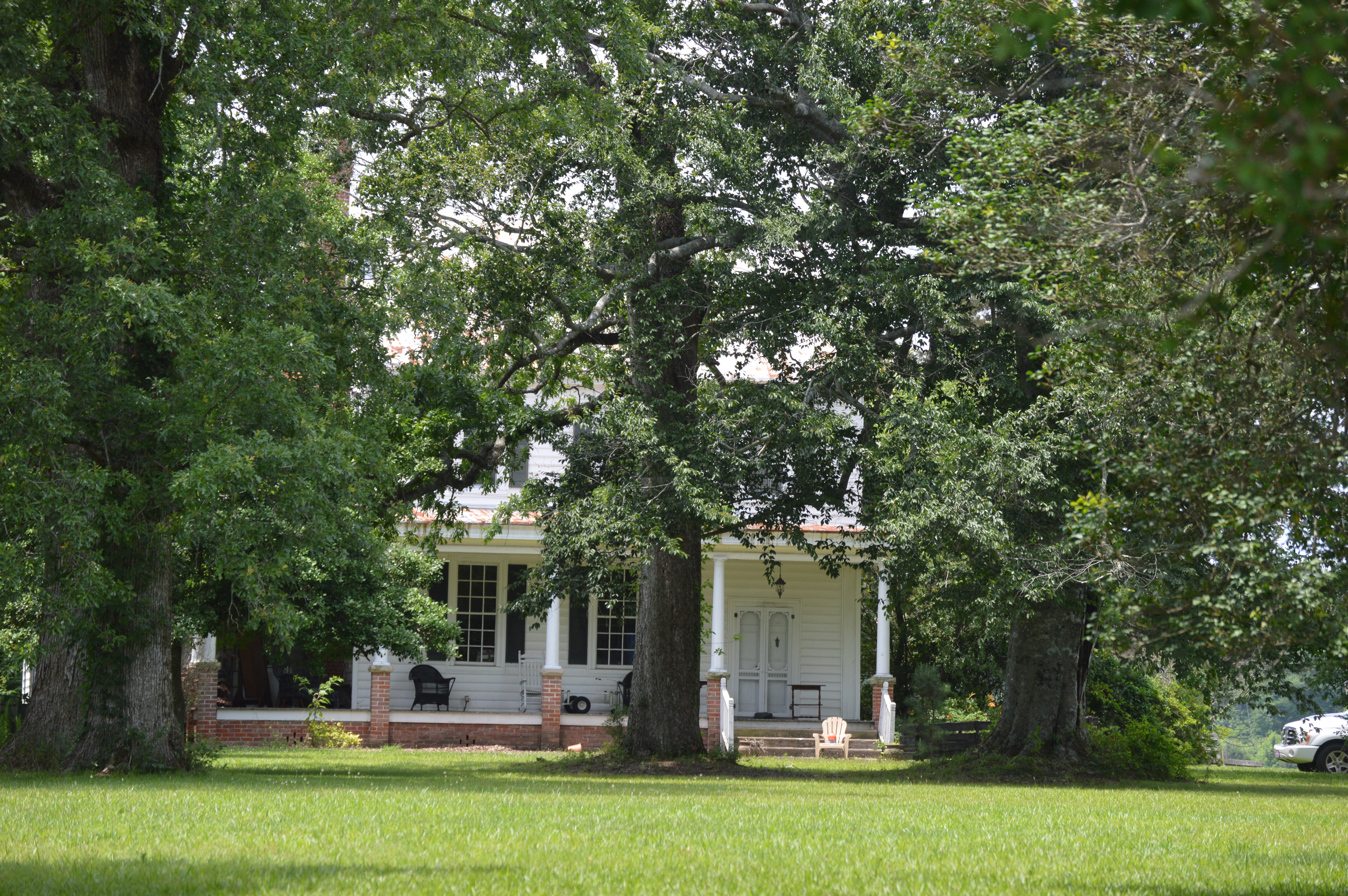
- Front

- Location within North Carolina Location within the United States
- Location: East of Gatesville near junction of SR 1400 and NC 37, near Gatesville, North Carolina
- Coordinates: 36°23′38″N 76°41′58″W
- Area: 4 acres (1.6 ha)
- Built: c. 1822
- Built by: David Parker
- Architectural style: Federal
- NRHP reference No.: 72000963
- Added to NRHP: February 1, 1972

Elmwood Plantation is a historic plantation house located near Gatesville, Gates County, North Carolina. It was built about 1822, and is a two-story, three-bay, Federal period frame building. It has a side-hall plan and a two-story, two-bay, rectangular side wing. Also on the property is a gambrel-roof frame kitchen, thought to be only one of its kind in North Carolina.

It was listed on the National Register of Historic Places in 1972.
