= Roberts–Carter House =

Historic house in North Carolina, United States

- U.S. National Register of Historic Places
- Location within North Carolina Location within the United States
- Location: Off NC 37, near Gatesville, North Carolina
- Coordinates: 36°21′40″N 76°43′1″W
- Area: 1.4 acres (0.57 ha)
- Built: c. 1830, c. 1860
- Architectural style: Greek Revival, Federal
- NRHP reference No.: 84002310
- Added to NRHP: March 1, 1984

Roberts–Carter House was a historic home near Gatesville, Gates County, North Carolina. It was built about 1830 and was a two-story, three-bay, Federal dwelling with a side-hall plan. It was remodeled in about 1860 to add Greek Revival style front and rear double-tier porticos. Also on the property are a contributing kitchen (c. 1900) and a smokehouse.

It was listed on the National Register of Historic Places in 1984. The house was destroyed by a tornado the same year.
