= George W. Mundy =

United States Air Force general (1905–2000)

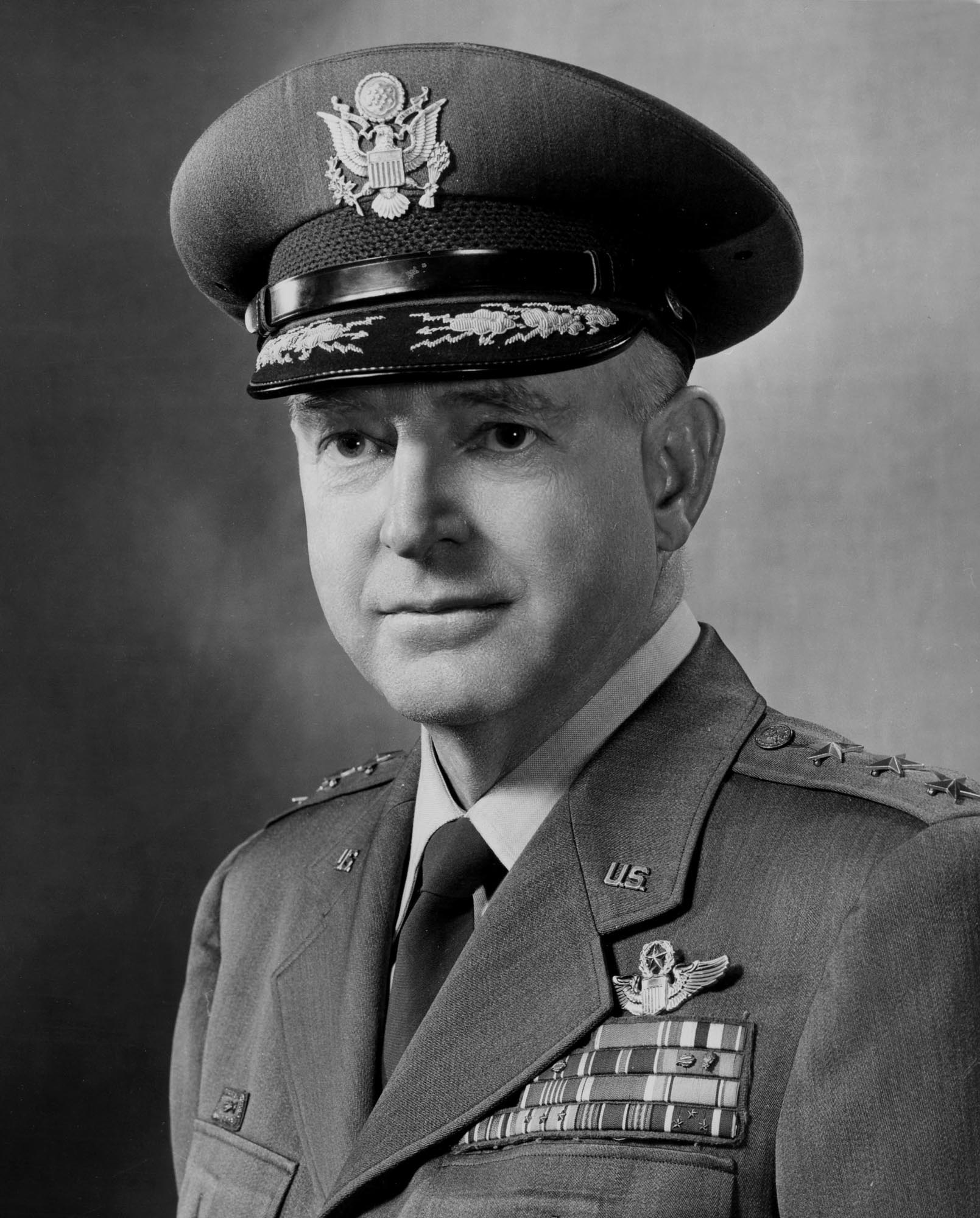
- George W. Mundy, Legion of Merit recipient
- Born: April 7, 1905; Cedartown, Georgia
- Died: March 3, 2000 (aged 94); San Antonio, Texas
- Burial place: Fort Sam Houston National Cemetery
- Military career
- Allegiance: United States
- Branch: United States Air Force
- Service years: 1928–1963
- Rank: Lieutenant general
- Conflicts: World War II
- Awards: Air Medal; Bronze Star; Silver Star; Legion of Merit; Distinguished Flying Cross; Asiatic-Pacific Campaign Medal

George Warren Mundy (April 7, 1905 – March 3, 2000) was an American lieutenant general and Legion of Merit recipient.

== Early life ==
At West Point in 1928

Mundy was born on August 7, 1905, in Cedartown, Georgia. From 1923 to 1924 he attended Emory University after which he joined United States Military Academy at West Point from which he obtained his bachelor's degree in 1928. During that time, his classmates were future generals such as William H. Tunner, Samuel E. Anderson, and Emmett O'Donnell Jr. After the graduation he was committed to the post of Second lieutenant of the Field Artillery on July 9.

== Career ==
=== Early career ===
In July 1928 George Mundy took pilot training in Brooks and Kelly Field, Texas. There, he flew PT-3, DH-4, P-l, A-3, and B-2 aircraft. By 1929 he was transferred to the United States Army Air Corps where he met Curtis Lemay and become his friend for life.

From October 1929 till September 1930 he took training at the Army Air Force Technical School in Chanute Air Force Base, Illinois. Following the training he joined 3d Operations Group in 1931. On March 2, 1934, he was promoted to first lieutenant and with that rank married Suzanne Buck.

In January 1935, Mundy was relocated to the Philippines where he worked as squadron officer with the 4th Composite Group and its 2nd Observation Squadron at Nichols Field. From December 1936 to January 1939 he was a staff officer of the 3d Operations Group at Barksdale, Louisiana and then the same year joined the United States Army Air Forces Technical School in Maxwell Field at Montgomery, Alabama.

=== World War II ===
From October 1939 to July 1941 Mundy worked as a staff officer with the 23rd Composite Group in both Maxwell, and Orlando, Florida. In January 1941, he departed to London, and returned home in October of the same year as military attaché. Following this trip, he was promoted to squadron commander of the same division. In February 1941 he was promoted again, this time he became a commanding officer of the Air Corps Proving Grounds at Eglin Field, Florida, a position which he kept for only 2 months. On October 26, 1942, he became command pilot following by becoming plans officer at AFRIT in Washington D.C. in November of the same year.

From June 30, 1943, to June 18, 1944, he was a commander at Laughlin Field, Del Rio, Texas. Later the same year, he was relocated to the 33rd Fighter Wing at first in Blackland and then in Waco Field where he still served as such until August 25, 1944. Next day, he was relocated to Randolph Air Force Base where he served as Chief of Staff for the 2500th Base Unit. During the same year, he attended Army-Navy Staff College from which he graduated in early 1945.

On February 15, 1945, Mundy was sent to Hamilton Army Airfield where he became operations and training staff officer of the XXI Bomber Command. In March of the same year he was named commanding officer of the 39th Bomb Group of Andersen Air Force Base. During that time, he flew fourteen missions on City of Galveston aircraft along with John Miranda's squadron against Nagoya. After the war, he and Miranda were honored with Silver Stars, and Miranda even was promoted to lead crew commander even though he was supposed to have been punished by Mundy for misconduct with military personnel.

== Post-war life and death ==
In August 1945 he was relocated to Tinian where he was a commander of 313th Bomb Wing. Two years later, he went to the Philippines where he was promoted to brigadier general and while there had an accident with B-17 aircraft. The accident happened during a liftoff when he, his instructor, and general were supposed to fly to Tokyo. The pilot was not familiar with B-17 configurations and therefore crashed the plane in which one person was killed and others were severely injured, while Mundy came out unharmed.

In June 1947, Mundy enrolled into National War College and graduated from there a year later, following by getting a job at the Wright-Patterson Air Force Base. There he served as Deputy as well as Director of Supply, Maintenance and Services. In 1951 he was promoted to Major general and throughout six years was promoted to Deputy commanding general and then to the Commanding general of the 2nd Air Force at Barksdale Air Force Base. As a commander of the 2nd Air Force, he visited Jordanian capital Amman where he was scheduled to meet with King Hussein of Jordan and an American ambassador. In 1957 Mundy became commandant at the Industrial College of the Armed Forces and in 1961 became Commander-in-Chief of North American Aerospace Defense Command in Alaska. He died in San Antonio on March 3, 2000, and was buried at Fort Sam Houston National Cemetery.
