= Freeman House (Gates, North Carolina) =

Historic house in North Carolina, United States

- U.S. National Register of Historic Places
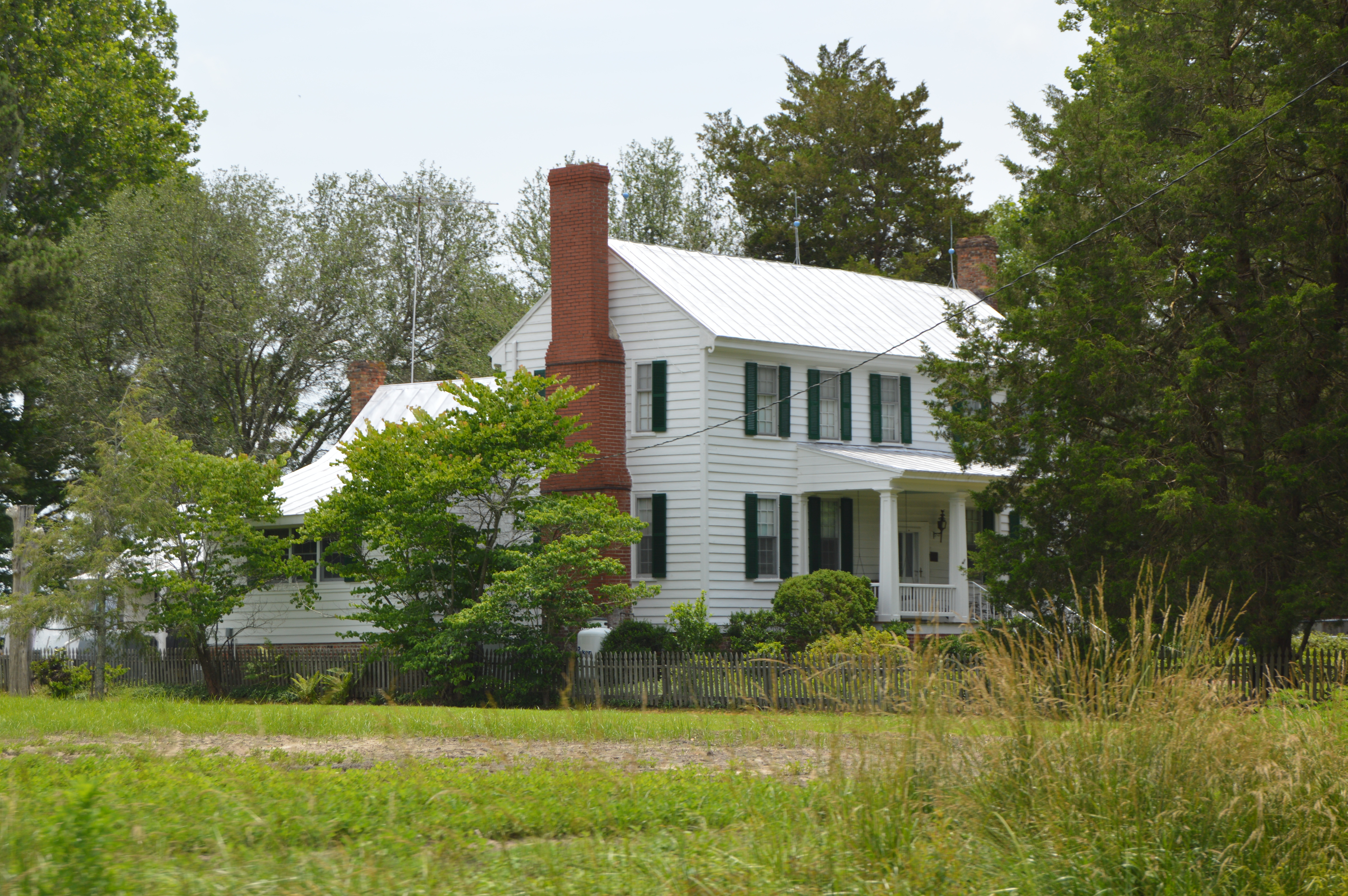
- Northern (Virginia) side

- Location within North Carolina Location within the United States
- Location: North of Gates on US 13, near Gates, North Carolina
- Coordinates: 36°33′2″N 76°45′19″W
- Area: 1.3 acres (0.53 ha)
- Architectural style: Greek Revival, Federal
- NRHP reference No.: 82003454
- Added to NRHP: September 23, 1982

Freeman House, also known as The Stateline House, is a historic home located on the North Carolina-Virginia state line near Gates, Gates County, North Carolina, USA. The house was built in three building phases, the earliest perhaps dating to the late-18th century. The farmhouse was initially built following the basic early-Federal-style one-room plan, followed by the addition of a late-Federal-style two-story side-hall-plan, which was finally enlarged and converted in the mid-19th century to a more substantial Greek Revival style, center-hall-plan dwelling. The main section is a two-story, five-bay, frame structure. Also on the property are the contributing smokehouse, a kitchen with exterior end chimney, a one-story tack house with an attached wood shed, a small, unidentified shed, two large barns, and a stable.

It was listed on the National Register of Historic Places in 1982.
