= Joseph Freeman Farm =

Historic farm in North Carolina, United States

- U.S. National Register of Historic Places
- U.S. Historic district
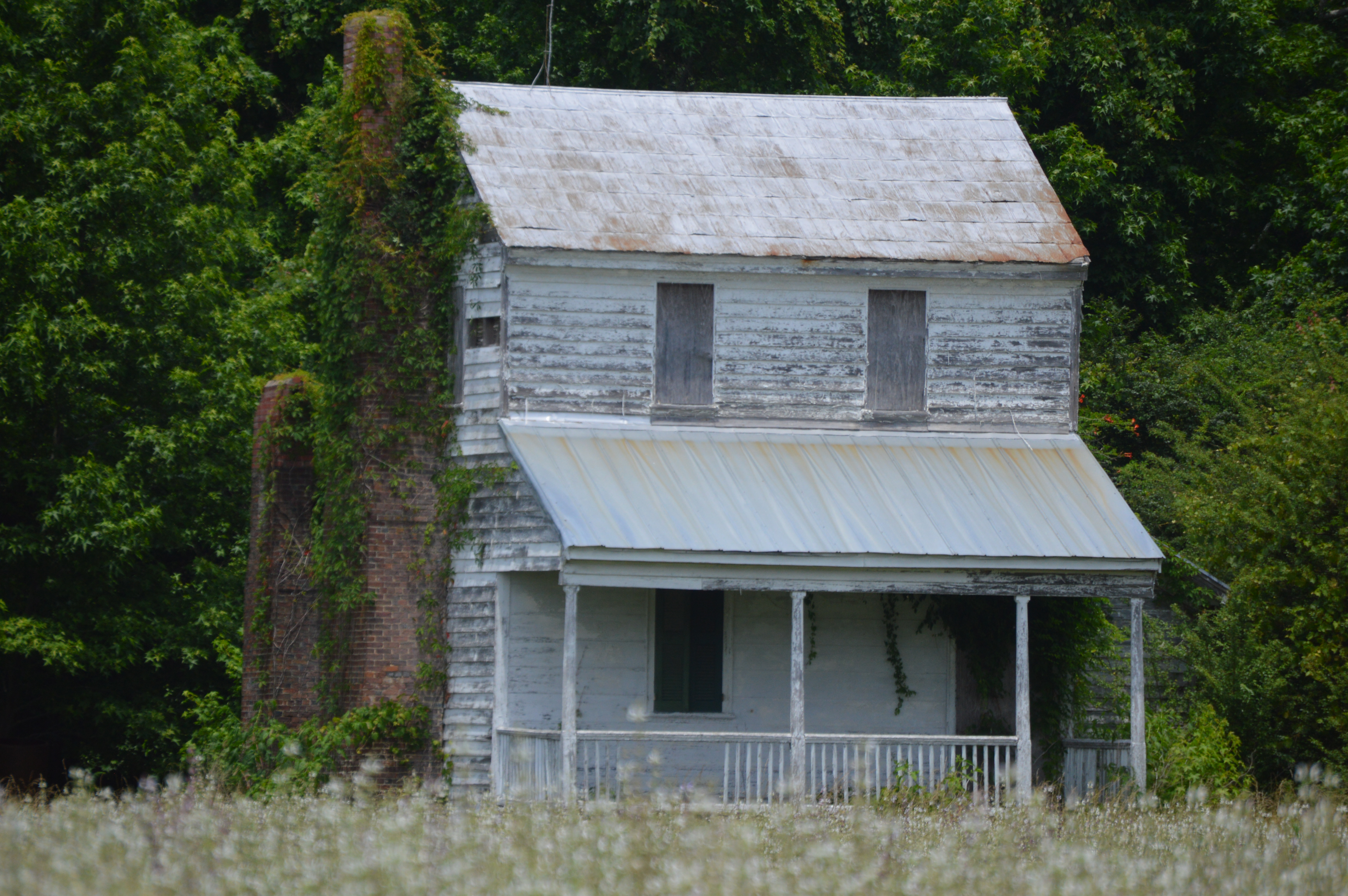
- Front and southern side

- Location within North Carolina Location within the United States
- Location: Northwest side of SR 1213, 0.7 miles northeast of the junction with SR 1212, near Gates, North Carolina
- Coordinates: 36°32′19″N 76°47′19″W
- Area: 124.2 acres (50.3 ha)
- Built: c. 1821, 1915
- Built by: Joseph Freeman
- Architectural style: Federal, Queen Anne
- NRHP reference No.: 99001333
- Added to NRHP: November 12, 1999

Joseph Freeman Farm is a historic farm complex and national historic district located near Gates, Gates County, North Carolina. The district encompasses six contributing buildings, one contributing site, and three contributing structures. The main house was built about 1821, and is a two-story, two-bay dwelling in a transitional Georgian / Federal style. A separate two-room kitchen/dining room ell was added about 1915. Associated with the house are the contributing smokehouse (c. 1935), privy (c. 1935), pump house (c. 1947), and domestic well (19th century). Contributing farm outbuildings include the lot well (c. 1915), equipment shelter (c. 1920), feed and livestock barn (c. 1920), and slave / tenant house (mid- to late-19th century).

It was listed on the National Register of Historic Places in 1999.
