= Gates, North Carolina =

- Unincorporated community
- Location within North Carolina Location within the United States
- Coordinates: 36°30′13″N 76°46′09″W
- Country: United States
- State: North Carolina
- County: Gates
- Elevation: 69 ft (21 m)
- Time zone: UTC-5 (Eastern (EST))
  - Summer (DST): UTC-4 (EDT)
- ZIP code: 27937
- Area code: 252
- GNIS feature ID: 985608

Gates is an unincorporated community in Gates County, North Carolina, United States. Gates is located on North Carolina Highway 37, 7 miles (11 km) north of Gatesville. Gates has a post office with ZIP code 27937.

The Freeman House and Joseph Freeman Farm are listed on the National Register of Historic Places.
