= Gatesville, North Carolina =

- Town
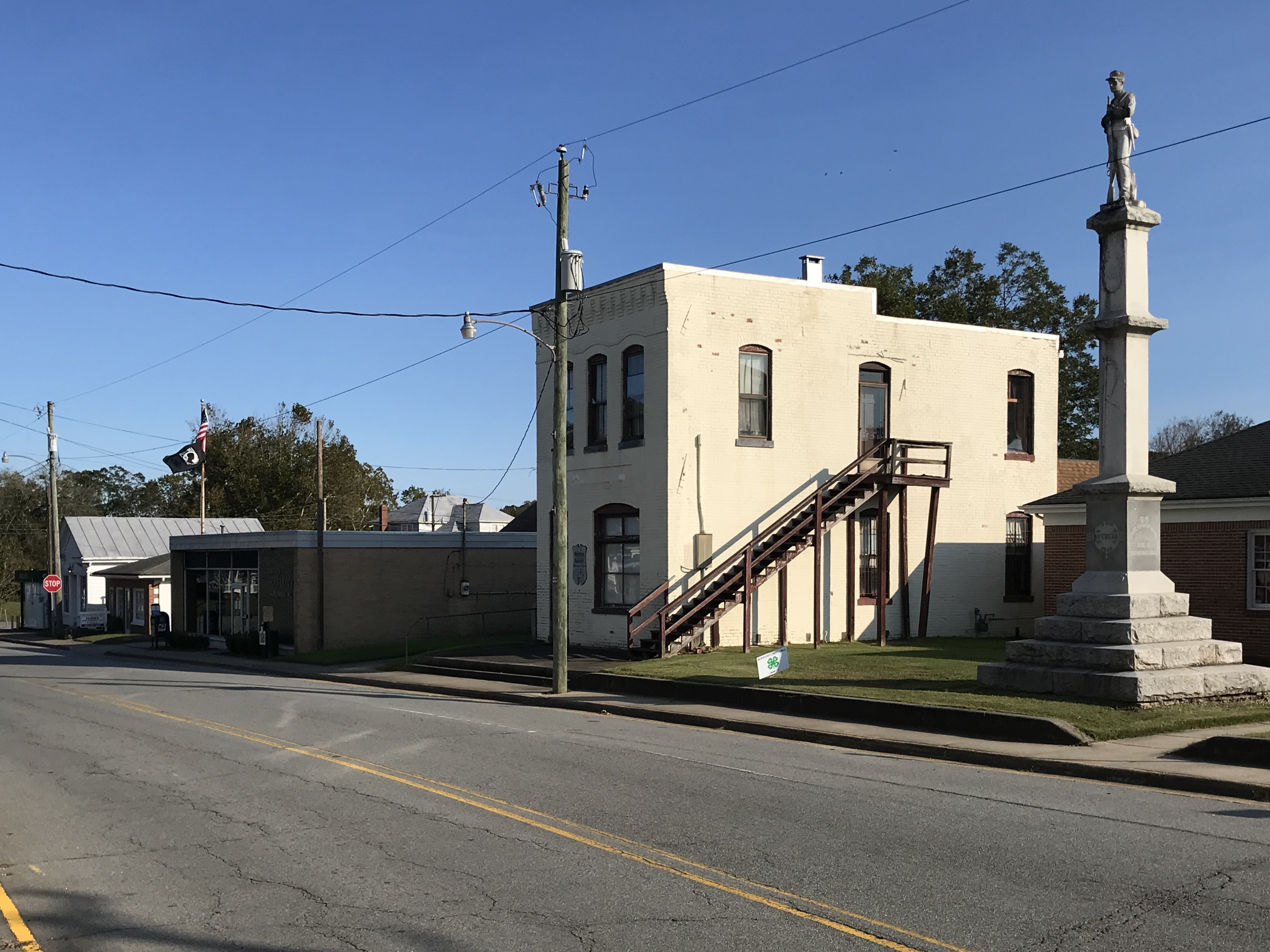
- Buildings along Court Street

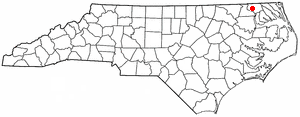
- Location of Gatesville, North Carolina
- Coordinates: 36°24′26″N 76°45′24″W
- Country: United States
- State: North Carolina
- County: Gates
- Founded: 1779
- Incorporated: 1830
- Named for: Horatio Gates

Area
  - Total: 0.41 sq mi (1.05 km^{2})
  - Land: 0.41 sq mi (1.05 km^{2})
  - Water: 0 sq mi (0.00 km^{2})
- Elevation: 23 ft (7.0 m)

Population (2020)
  - Total: 267
  - Density: 661.2/sq mi (255.31/km^{2})
- Time zone: UTC-5 (Eastern (EST))
  - Summer (DST): UTC-4 (EDT)
- ZIP code: 27938
- Area code: 252
- FIPS code: 37-25680
- GNIS feature ID: 2406552
- Website: https://gatesville.org/

Gatesville is a town in Gates County, North Carolina, United States. As of the 2020 census, Gatesville had a population of 267. It is the county seat of Gates County.

== History ==
The area which presently encompasses Gatesville was originally known as Bennetts Creek Landing. From 1779 it was known as Gates Courthouse until its incorporation in 1830 as Gatesville, being named for Horatio Gates, a commander in the American Revolutionary War.

The Elmwood Plantation, Eure-Roberts House, Gates County Courthouse, Roberts-Carter House, Rountree Family Farm and Reid's Grove School are listed on the National Register of Historic Places.

== Geography ==
According to the United States Census Bureau, the town has a total area of 0.4 square miles (1.0 km^{2}), all land.

== Demographics ==
Historical population
Census	Pop.	Note	%±
1870	156		—
1880	187		19.9%
1890	232		24.1%
1900	200		−13.8%
1910	203		1.5%
1930	320		—
1940	297		−7.2%
1950	323		8.8%
1960	460		42.4%
1970	338		−26.5%
1980	363		7.4%
1990	308		−15.2%
2000	281		−8.8%
2010	321		14.2%
2020	267		−16.8%
U.S. Decennial Census

=== 2020 census ===
Gatesville racial composition
Race	Number	Percentage
White (non-Hispanic)	230	86.14%
Black or African American (non-Hispanic)	28	10.49%
Native American	2	0.75%
Other/Mixed	5	1.87%
Hispanic or Latino	2	0.75%

As of the 2020 United States census, there were 267 people, 120 households, and 71 families residing in the town.

=== 2000 census ===
As of the census of 2000, there were 281 people, 117 households, and 80 families residing in the town. The population density was 675.8 inhabitants per square mile (260.9/km^{2}). There were 142 housing units at an average density of 341.5 per square mile (131.9/km^{2}). The racial makeup of the town was 87.54% White, 11.03% African American, 0.36% Native American, and 1.07% from two or more races. Hispanic or Latino of any race were 0.36% of the population.

There were 117 households, out of which 29.9% had children under the age of 18 living with them, 59.0% were married couples living together, 7.7% had a female householder with no husband present, and 30.8% were non-families. 29.1% of all households were made up of individuals, and 17.9% had someone living alone who was 65 years of age or older. The average household size was 2.40 and the average family size was 3.00.

In the town, the population was spread out, with 25.3% under the age of 18, 5.3% from 18 to 24, 24.6% from 25 to 44, 24.2% from 45 to 64, and 20.6% who were 65 years of age or older. The median age was 41 years. For every 100 females there were 82.5 males. For every 100 females age 18 and over, there were 85.8 males.

The median income for a household in the town was $49,375, and the median income for a family was $62,500. Males had a median income of $40,625 versus $27,500 for females. The per capita income for the town was $18,190. About 2.8% of families and 3.9% of the population were below the poverty line, including 5.4% of those under the age of eighteen and 9.8% of those 65 or over.

== Notable people ==
- Jessie Britt (born 1963), football player
- Calvin Earl (born 1952), performer & educator of the African American spirituals
- Charles Walter Greene (1849–1926), educator
- John M. Harrell (1828–1907), lawyer and writer
- L. Glenn Perry (1944–1998), former Chief Accountant of the United States Securities and Exchange Commission
- Floyd Millard Riddick (1908–2000), senior civil servant
- Herman Riddick (1907–1968), football player and coach
- William Paul Roberts (1841–1910), politician and diplomat
- Thomas Smith (born 1970), football player
- Delmar T. Spivey (1905–1982), military officer
- Andrew Jackson Stedman (1828–1884), publisher
- Hallett Sydney Ward (1870–1956), U.S. representative from North Carolina
