= List of former members of the Raleigh City Council =

Raleigh City Council

Type
- Type: Unicameral

Structure
- Seats: 8
- Political groups: Nonpartisan (de jure) (8)

Elections
- Last election: November 5, 2024
- Next election: 2026

The List of former members of the Raleigh City Council documents the elected members of the Raleigh City Council, the legislative governing body of the capital city of Raleigh, North Carolina, since the adoption of the Council–manager government system in 1947.

The city council is composed of a Mayor and eight council members, who are elected in non-partisan elections. The council sets policy and legislative direction while a professional city manager oversees day-to-day administration. Historically, all members served two-year terms, but the council has recently undergone significant election reforms, including moving elections to even-numbered years (starting in 2022) and transitioning to four-year staggered terms beginning in 2026.

The list below details the composition of the council for each term since 1947, including Mayor, Mayor Pro Tem, and the at-large and district representatives.

== Council Terms (1947–present) ==
=== 1947–1959 ===
1947 – 1949

- P. D. Snipes - Mayor
- Miss Ruth Wilson
- Fred B. Wheeler
- Hobson I. Gattis
- John F. Danielson
- Fred Fletcher
- Joe S. Correll

1949 – 1951

- P. D. Snipes - Mayor
- James E. Briggs - Mayor Pro Tem
- Miss Ruth Wilson
- Joe S. Correll
- John F. Danielson
- Hobson I. Gattis
- Fred B. Wheeler

1951 – 1953

- James E. Briggs - Mayor
- Fred B. Wheeler - Mayor Pro Tem, Chairman of Law & Finance Committee
- B. B. Benson
- John F. Danielson - Chairman of Public Works Committee
- W. W. Merriman Jr.
- W. D. Martin Sr.
- Martin K. Green

1953 – 1955

- Fred B. Wheeler - Mayor
- John F. Danielson - Chairman of Public Works Committee
- B. B. Benson - Mayor Pro Tem
- W. D. Debnam
- William G. Enloe - Chairman of Law & Finance Committee
- Martin K. Green
- W. D. Martin Sr.

1955 – 1957

- Fred B. Wheeler - Mayor
- John F. Danielson - Mayor Pro Tem, Chairman of Public Works Committee
- W. E. Debnam (resigned 7/20/57 – Wade Lewis appointed)
- Charles W. Bradshaw
- Martin K. Green
- Frank M. Jolly
- William G. Enloe - Chairman of Law & Finance Committee

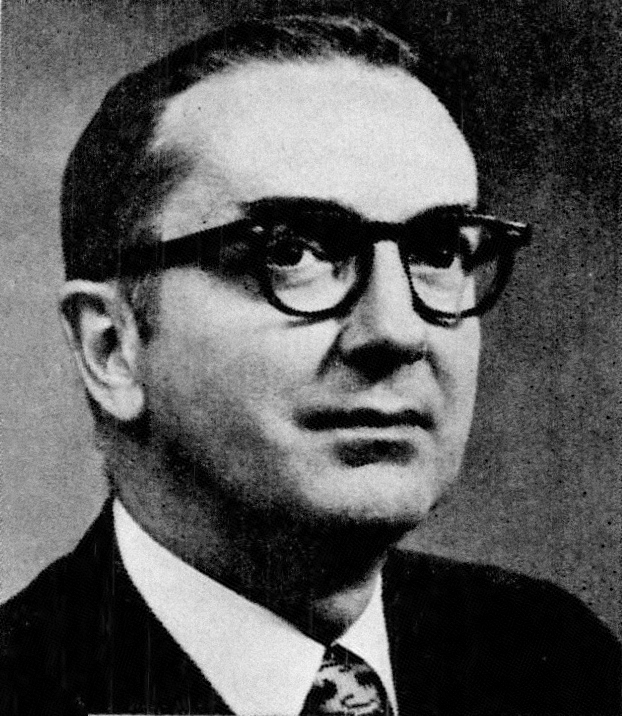
Helms c. 1973

1957 – 1959

- Wililam G. Enloe - Mayor
- Guy W. Rawls - Mayor Pro Tem
- John N. Coffey - Chairman of Public Works Committee at death of Fred B. Wheeler
- Joe S. Correll
- Jesse Helms - Chairman of Law & Finance Committee
- James D. Ray Jr.
- Fred D. Wheeler (died in office 12/11/57 – John E.Treadwell appointed)

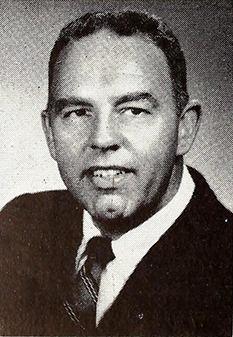
Reid in 1957

1959 – 1961

- William G. Enloe - Mayor
- James W. Reid - Mayor Pro Tem
- John N. Coffee - Chairman of Public Works Committee
- Joe S. Correll
- Jesse Helms - Chairman of Law & Finance Committee
- Robert S. Sessoms Jr.
- Paul A. Hoover

=== 1960s ===
Photo of Winters

1961 – 1963

- Wiliam G. Enloe - Mayor
- James W. Reid - Mayor Pro Tem
- John N. Coffee - Chairman of Public Works Committee
- Paul A. Hoover - Chairman of Law & Finance Committee
- William L. McLaurin
- Travis H. Tomlinson
- John W. Winters

1963 – 1965

- James W. Reid - Mayor
- Wiliam L. McLaurin - Mayor Pro Tem
- Earl H. Hostetler
- William H. Worth
- Travis H. Tomlinson, Chairman of Law & Finance Committee
- John Winters, Chairman of Public Works and Planning Commission
- Charles W. Gaddy

1965 – 1967

- Travis H. Tomlinson - Mayor
- William L. McLaurin Mayor Pro Tem
- Earl H. Hostetler
- William H. Worth
- John W. Winters
- Charles W. Gaddy
- William M. Law

1967 – 1969

- Travis H. Tomlinson - Mayor
- Earl H. Hostetler - Mayor Pro Tem
- Clarence E. Lightner
- William H. Worth
- William M. Law
- Seby B. Jones
- George B. Cherry

1969 – 1971

- Seby B. Jones - Mayor
- George B. Cherry - Mayor Pro Tem
- Clarence E. Lightner
- Jesse O. Sanderson
- Thomas W. Bradshaw
- A. L. Strickland
- Robert W. Shoffner

=== 1970s ===
1971 – 1973

- Thomas W. Bradshaw Jr. – Mayor
- Clarence E. Lightner - Mayor Pro Tem
- Michael Boyd
- Jesse O. Sanderson (resigned 2/29/73 – Paul Hoover appointed)
- William G. Enloe (died 11/22/72 – Edith Reid appointed)
- A. L. Strickland
- Robert W. Shoffner

1973 – 1975

- Clarence E. Lightner - Mayor
- Jack B. Keeter - Mayor Pro Tem
- Ronald I. Kirshbaum
- Thomas G. Bashford
- Miriam P. Block
- William R. Knight
- James T. Quinn
- J. Oliver Wililams

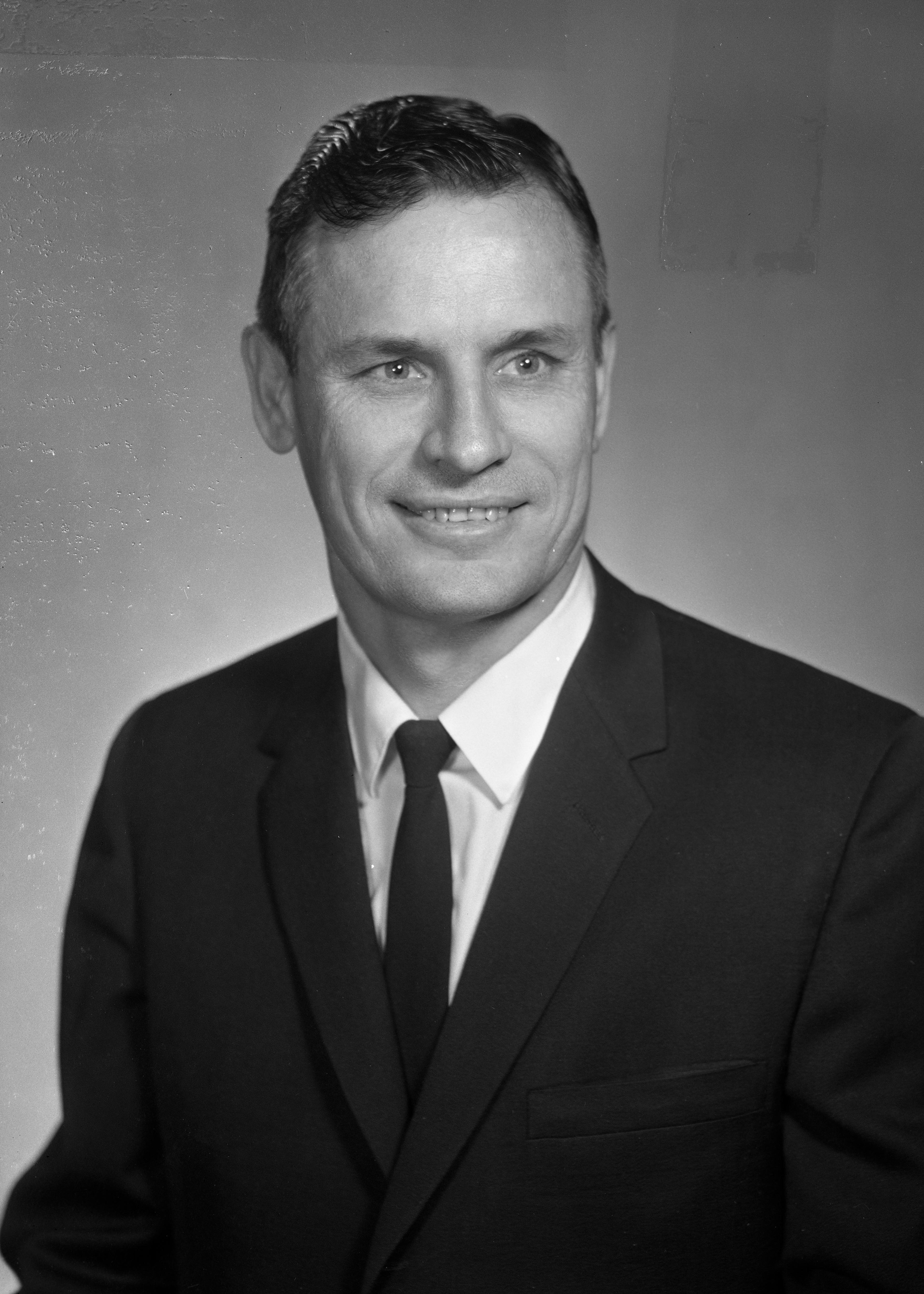
Portrait of Coggins c. 1963

1975 – 1977

- Jyles J. Coggins - Mayor
- Jack B. Keeter - Mayor Pro Tem
- Ronald I. Kirschbaum
- Thomas G. Bashford
- Miriam P. Block
- Randolph T. Hester Jr.
- William R. Knight
- James T. Quinn

1977 – 1979

- Isabella W. Cannon - Mayor
- Jack B. Keeter - Mayor Pro Tem (died 12/2/78 – James B. Womble appointed)
- Miriam P. Block
- William R. Knight
- Edward A. Walters
- William H. Wilson
- George Smedes York
- S. Tony Jordan

1979 – 1981

- G. Smedes York - Mayor
- Edward A. Walters - Mayor
- James B. Womble
- Miriam P. Block
- John A. Edwards Jr.
- Arthur J. Calloway
- S. Tony Jordan
- Avery C. Upchurch

=== 1980s ===
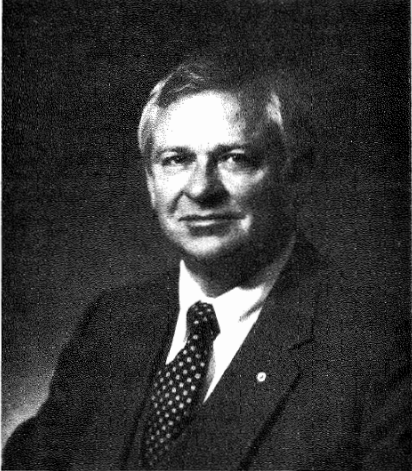
Portrait of Upchurch

1981 - 1983

- G. Smedes York - Mayor
- Edwards A. Walters - Mayor Pro Tem
- Sandra P. Babb
- Walter M. Keller
- John A. Edwards Jr.
- Arthur J. Calloway
- S. Tony Jordan
- Avery C. Upchurch

1983 – 1985

- Avery C. Upchurch - Mayor
- Edward A. Walters - Mayor Pro Tem
- Sandra P. Babb
- Walter M. Keller
- Miriam P. Block
- Arthur J. Calloway
- Mary C. Cates
- O. Morton Congleton

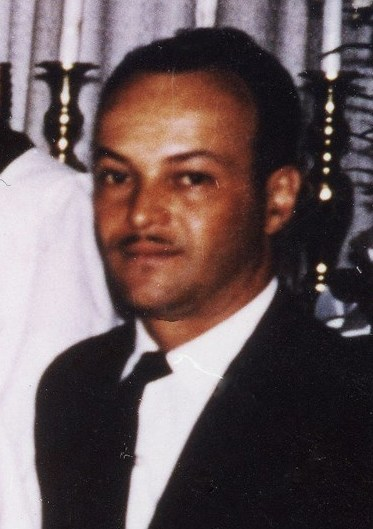
Ralph Campbell Jr., date unknown

1985 – 1987

- Avery C. Upchurch - Mayor
- Edward A. Walters - Mayor Pro Tem
- Mary C. Cates
- O. Morton Congleton
- Perry Safran
- Charles C. Meeker
- Ralph Campbell Jr.
- Norma DeCamp Burns

1987 – 1989

- Avery C. Upchurch - Mayor
- Mary C. Cates - Mayor Pro Tem
- Charles C. Meeker
- Ralph Campbell Jr.
- Norma DeCamp Burns
- Geoffrey Elting
- Anne S. Franklin
- Mary Watson Nooe

1989 – 1991

- Avery C. Upchurch - Mayor
- Ralph Campbell Jr. - Mayor Pro Tem
- Mary C. Cates
- Anne S. Franklin
- Mary Watson Nooe
- Frank L. Turner
- E. Julian Ford
- J. Barlow Herget

=== 1990s ===
1991 – 1993

- Avery C. Upchurch - Mayor
- Anne S. Franklin - Mayor Pro Tem
- Mary C. Cates
- Mary Watson Nooe
- Ralph Campbell Jr. (elected State Auditor – Charles Francis appointed)
- Charles C. Meeker
- Geoffrey Elting
- J. Barlow Hergett

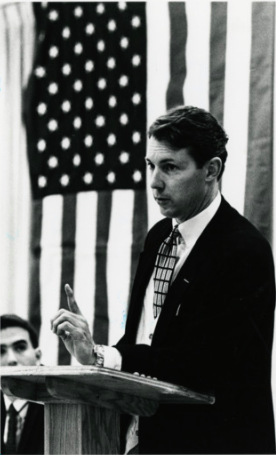
Tom Fetzer at college Republicans meeting

1993 – 1995

- Tom Fetzer - Mayor
- Mary Watson Nooe - Mayor Pro Tem
- Charles C. Meeker
- Geoff Elting
- John H. Odom
- Brad Thompson
- Eric Reeves
- Paul Y. Coble

1995 - 1997

- Tom Fetzer - Mayor
- Julie Shea-Graw
- Marc Scruggs
- Kieran Joseph Shanahan
- John H. Odom
- Brad Thompson
- Eric Reeves (elected to State House of Representatives 12-96 – Stacy Miller app’t 1-97)
- Paul Coble

1997 – 1999

- Tom Fetzer - Mayor
- Julie Shea-Graw
- Stephanie Fanjul
- Kieran Joseph Shanahan
- John H. Odom
- Brad Thompson
- W. Benson Kirkman
- Paul Coble

1999 – 2001

- Paul Coble - Mayor
- John H. Odom - Mayor Pro Tem
- Julie Shea-Graw
- O. Morton Congleton
- Kieran Joseph Shanahan
- James West
- W. Benson Kirkman
- Marc Scruggs

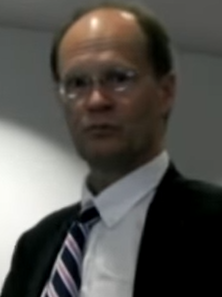
Photo of Charles Meeker

=== 2000s ===
2001 – 2003

- Charles C. Meeker - Mayor
- W. Benson Kirkman - Deputy Mayor
- John H. Odom - Deputy Mayor
- Janet R. Cowell
- Neal Hunt
- Philip R. Isley
- Kieran Joseph Shanahan
- James P. West

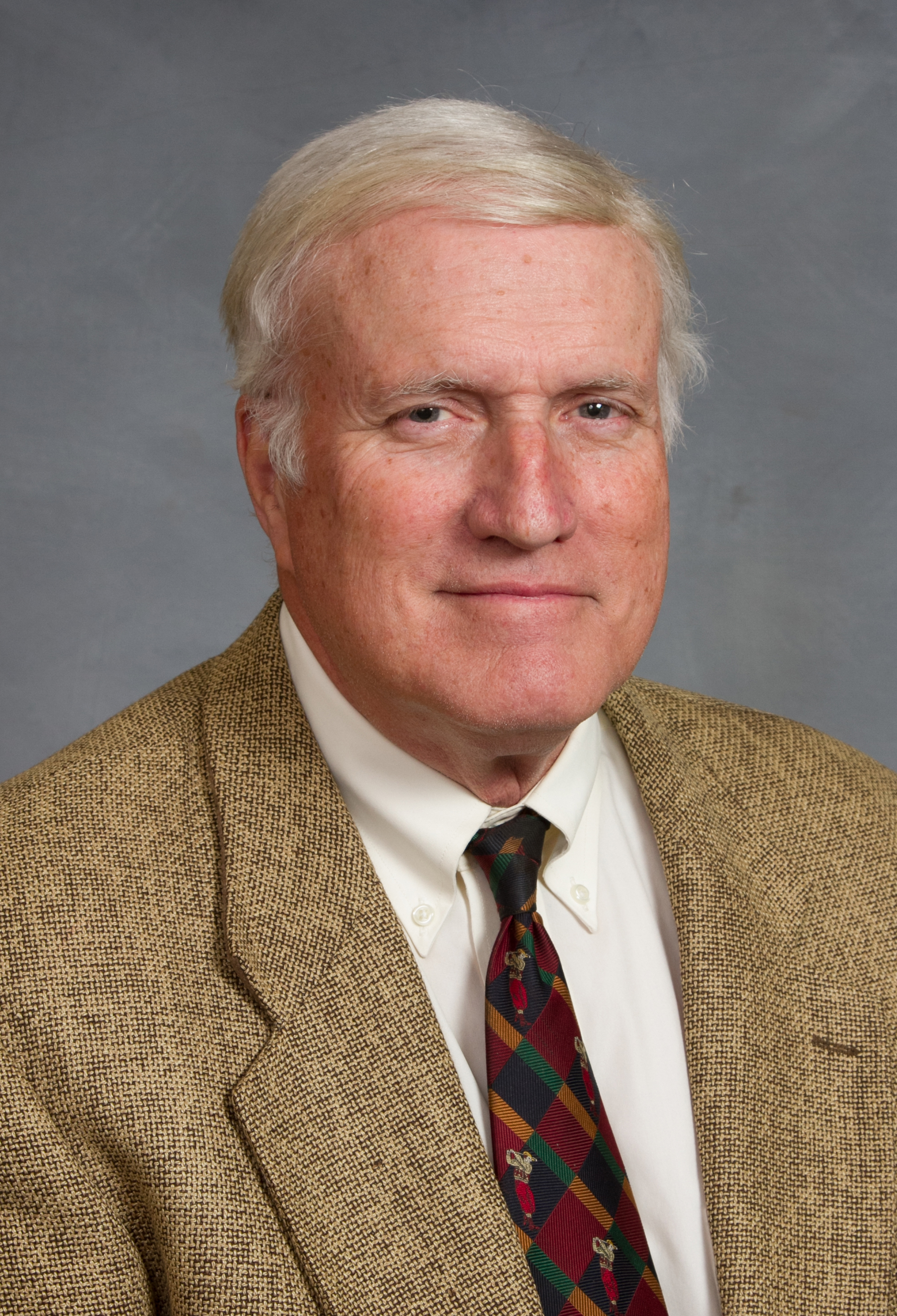
Photo of Neal Hunt

2003 – 2005

- Charles C. Meeker - Mayor
- James P. West, Mayor Pro Tem – District C
- Janet Cowell - replaced by Joyce Kekas 2/1/05 -Cowell elected to NC Senate - At Large
- Neal Hunt - replaced by Tommy Craven 2/1/05 – Hunt elected to NC Senate- At Large
- Mike Regan – District A
- Jessie Taliaferro – District B
- Thomas Crowder – District D
- Philip R. Isley – District E

2005 – 2007

- Charles C. Meeker - Mayor
- Russ Stephenson – At Large
- Joyce Kekas – At Large
- Thomas Craven – District A
- Jessie Taliaferro – District B
- James P. West – District C – Mayor Pro Tem
- Thomas G. Crowder – District D
- Philip R. Isley – District E

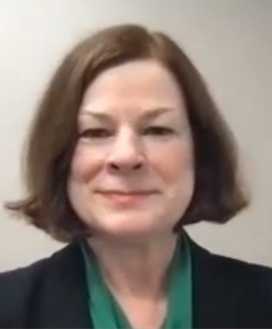
Photo of Mary Ann Baldwin

2007 – 2009

- Charles C. Meeker - Mayor
- James P. West - Mayor Pro Tem, District C
- Mary Ann Baldwin – At Large
- Russ Stephenson – At Large
- Nancy McFarlane – District A
- Rodger Koopman - District B
- Thomas G. Crowder – District D
- Philip R. Isley – District E

2009 – 2011

- Charles C. Meeker – Mayor
- James P. West- Mayor Pro Tem, District C (Resigned to become Wake County Commissioner 9/21/10)
- Mary-Ann Baldwin – At Large (Mayor Pro Tem 10/19/10 – 4/30/11)
- Russ Stephenson – At Large
- Nancy McFarlane – District A (Mayor Pro Tem 5/1/11 – 12/5/11)
- John Odom – District B
- Eugene Weeks – District C (October 19, 2010)
- Thomas G. Crowder – District D
- Bonner Gaylord – District E

=== 2010s ===
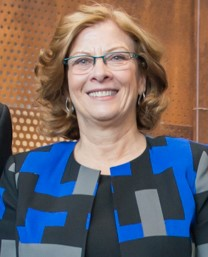
Photo of Nancy McFarlane from 2018

2011 – 2013

- Nancy McFarlane – Mayor
- Russ Stephenson – At Large; Mayor Pro Tem 12/6/11 – 12/03/12
- Eugene Weeks – District C; Mayor Pro Tem 12/04/12 – 12/03/13
- Mary-Ann Baldwin – At Large
- Randall Stagner – District A
- John Odom – District B
- Thomas Crowder – District D
- Bonner Gaylord – District E

2013 – 2015

- Nancy McFarlane – Mayor
- Mary-Ann Baldwin – At-Large
- Russ Stephenson – At-Large
- Wayne Maiorano – District A
- John Odom – District B
- Eugene Weeks – District C
- Thomas Crowder – District D
- Bonner Gaylord – District E

2015-2017

- Nancy McFarlane – Mayor
- Mary-Ann Baldwin – At-Large
- Russ Stephenson – At-Large
- Dickie Thompson – District A
- David Cox – District B
- Corey Branch – District C
- Kay Crowder – District D
- Bonner Gaylord – District E

2017-2019

- Nancy McFarlane - Mayor
- Nicole Stewart - at-large
- Russ Stephenson - at-large
- Dickie Thompson - District A
- David Cox - District B
- Corey Branch - District C
- Kay Crowder - District D
- Stef Mendell - District E

=== 2020s ===
2019-2021

- Mary Ann Baldwin - Mayor
- Nicole Stewart - Mayor Pro Tem, at-large
- Johnathan Melton - at-large
- Patrick Buffkin - District A
- David Cox - District B
- Corey Branch - Mayor Pro Tem, District C
- Saige Martin - District D
- David Knight - District E

2022-2024

- Mary-Ann Baldwin - Mayor
- Jonathan Melton - at-large
- Stormie Forte - at-large
- Mary Black-Branch - District A
- Megan Patton - District B
- Corey Branch - District C
- Jane Harrison - District D
- Christina Jones - District E

== See also ==
- Raleigh City Council
- List of mayors of Raleigh, North Carolina
- Raleigh, North Carolina
- Wake County, North Carolina
