= List of mayors of Raleigh, North Carolina =

This is a list of mayors of Raleigh since the creation of the office in 1857. The Mayor is the head of a council-manager system of government for Raleigh, North Carolina. The office was created in 1857 when a new charter was established for the city to replace the original 1795 charter. Mayor William H. Harrison was mayor during the Confederate States of America and eventually surrendered the city back to the United States before Sherman's March to the Sea arrived.

== Intendants of Police ==
Under Raleigh's original 1795 charter, the equivalent of a mayor was called the "Intendant of Police" (a title borrowed from France). The first person to hold the office was John Haywood. He was elected by the city board of commissioners (who were themselves appointed by the North Carolina General Assembly). Starting in 1803, intendants of police were elected annually by all land-owning free men, including free African-Americans.

#	Mayor	Term start	Term end
1	John Haywood	1795	c. 1803
2	William White	1803	1806
3	William Hill	1806	1807
4	Dr. Calvin Jones	1807	1809
5	John Marshall	1809	1811
6	Jonathan S. Robeteau	1812	1813
7	Sterling Yancey	1813	1814
8	Alexander Lucas	1814	1816
9	Mark Cooke	1817	1819
10	Joseph Gales, Sr. (first time)	1819	1826
11	John Bell	1826	1827
12	Joseph Gales, Sr. (second time)	1827	1833
13	Thomas Cobbs	1833	1834
14	Weston Raleigh Gales (first time)	1835	1837
15	Thomas Cobbs	1837	1838
16	William C. Carrington	1838	1839
17	Thomas Cobbs	1839	1840
18	Joseph Gales, Sr. (third time)	1840	1841
19	William F. Clarke	1841	1842
20	Thomas Loring	1842	1843
21	Weston Raleigh Gales (second time)	1843	1847
22	William Dallas Haywood	1847	1857

== List of mayors ==
#	Mayor	Term start	Term end
23	William Dallas Haywood (first time)	1857	1858
24	William H. Harrison (first time)	1858	1867
25	William Dallas Haywood (second time)	1867	1868
26	Charles B. Root	1868	1869
27	William H. Harrison (second time)	1869	1872
28	Wesley Whitaker	1872	1874
29	Joseph W. Holden	1874	1875
30	John C. Gorman	1875	1875
31	Joseph Henry Separk (died in office)	1875	1875
32	Basil C. Manly (died in office)	1875	1882
33	William H. Dodd	1882	1887
34	Alfred A. Thompson	1887	1891
35	Thomas Badger	1891	1895
36	William M. Russ	1895	1898
37	A. M. Powell	1898	1905
38	James I. Johnson (first time)	1905	1909
39	James S. Wynne	1909	1911
40	James I. Johnson (second time)	1911	1919
41	T. B. Eldridge	1919	1923
42	Eugene English Culbreth	1923	1931
43	George A. Iseley	1931	1939
44	Graham H. Andrews	1939	1947
45	Percey Daniel Snipes	1947	1951
46	James E. Briggs	1951	1953
47	Fred B. Wheeler	1951	1957
48	William Gilmore Enloe	1957	1963
49	James William Reid	1963	1965
50	Travis Hocutt Tomlinson	1965	1969
51	Seby Brown Jones	1969	1971
52	Thomas Wood Bradshaw, Jr.	1971	1973
53	Clarence Everett Lightner	1973	1975
54	Jyles Jackson Coggins	1975	1977
55	Isabella McLean Bett Walton Cannon	1977	1979
56	George Smedes York	1979	1983
57	Avery Council Upchurch	1983	1993
58	Tom Harrison Fetzer	1993	1999
59	Paul Yelverton Coble	1999	2001
60	Charles Carpenter Meeker	2001	2011
61	Nancy Pletcher McFarlane	2011	2019
62	Mary-Ann Baldwin	2019	2024
63	Janet Cowell	2024	-

== See also ==
- Timeline of Raleigh, North Carolina
