= Clarence Lightner =

American politician (1921–2002)

30th Mayor of Raleigh, North Carolina
- In office 1973 – December 1975
- Preceded by: Thomas W. Bradshaw
- Succeeded by: Jyles Coggins

Member of the Raleigh City Council
- In office 1967–1973

Member of the North Carolina Senate from the 14th district
- In office August 9, 1977 – 1978 Serving with I. Beverly Lake Jr., Robert Webb Wynne
- Preceded by: John W. Winters
- Succeeded by: William Ayden Creech

Personal details
- Born: August 15, 1921 Raleigh, North Carolina, U.S.
- Died: July 8, 2002 (aged 80) Raleigh, North Carolina, U.S.
- Resting place: Mt. Hope Cemetery, Raleigh, North Carolina, U.S.
- Party: Democratic Party
- Spouse: Marguerite Massey (m. 1946)
- Education: North Carolina Central College; Echols College of Mortuary Science
- Profession: Mortician

Military service
- Allegiance: United States
- Branch/service: United States Army
- Years of service: 1942–1946

Clarence Everett Lightner (August 15, 1921 – July 8, 2002) was an American politician and mortician. A member of the Democratic Party, he served as Mayor of Raleigh, North Carolina from 1973 to 1975. He was the first popularly elected Mayor of Raleigh since 1947, and the first African American elected mayor of a mostly-white, major Southern city in the United States.

Lightner was born in 1921 in Raleigh. He attended North Carolina Central College, where he played as a quarterback on the school football team. After graduating, he enlisted in the United States Army and served on a tour of duty during World War II. He subsequently enrolled in the Echols College of Mortuary Science, and in 1959 he assumed control of his father Calvin E. Lightner's funeral home. He was elected to the Raleigh City Council in 1967. During his council tenure he chaired a committee tasked with studying mass transit and for one term acted as Mayor pro tempore. In 1973 he launched his candidacy for the office of Mayor. Backed by a coalition of blacks—who comprised less than 16% of all registered voters—and white suburban residents who were growing increasingly concerned about urban sprawl, Lightner won the November election, surprising observers and garnering national media attention. During his mayoral tenure the city council bolstered floodplain construction regulations, rejected large road construction projects, and instituted a mass transit system.

Though Lighter's service was largely uncontroversial, members of his family were mired by legal troubles. His reputation suffered as a result, and he placed last in the mayoral primary election in 1975. In 1977 he was appointed to fill the vacant North Carolina State Senate seat for the 14th district, serving through 1978. He chaired the Southeast Raleigh Improvement Commission from 1993 to 2001. Lightner died in 2002.

== Early life ==
Clarence Everett Lightner was born on August 15, 1921, in Raleigh, North Carolina, to Mammie Blackmon and Calvin E. Lightner. He was the youngest of four children. Calvin Lightner founded the Lightner Funeral Home in 1911 and made an unsuccessful bid for a seat on the Raleigh City Council in 1919. Though the city was racially segregated at the time, Clarence—who was black—was raised at the edge of a white neighborhood and frequently played sports with white children in his youth. He attended public schools in Raleigh, and spent much of his free time in high school assisting his father in the funeral home. In his younger years he also worked at Chavis Park, a recreational area in Raleigh for black people.

In 1938 Lightner enrolled in North Carolina Central College. While there, Lightner played on the football team as a quarterback and joined the Omega Psi Phi fraternity. He graduated in 1941. In 1942 he enlisted in the United States Army, serving for a total of four years, including a tour of duty during World War II. He subsequently enrolled in the Echols College of Mortuary Science in Philadelphia, Pennsylvania. Lightner aspired to become a physician and did not intend on assuming control over his father's business. However, in 1959, following his brother's death, his father gave him charge of the funeral home. Lightner later served as president of the National Funeral Directors and Morticians Association and chaired the National Life Membership Foundation of Omega Psi Phi Fraternity. He was a member of the National Negro Business League and worked as an official for the Central Intercollegiate Athletic Association.

Lightner met Marguerite Massey while studying at North Carolina Central College. They married in 1946, and had two sons and two daughters: Bruce, Lawrence, Debra and Claire. Lightner was a parishioner at Davie Street Presbyterian Church, and served on its Men's Council.

== Political career ==
=== Activism and city council tenure ===
Lightner was a member of the National Association for the Advancement of Colored People, and the Democratic Party, and held moderate political views. He was a member of the "Oval Table Gang", an informal group of community leaders that met in Ralph Campbell Sr.'s home to discuss strategies to desegregate Raleigh schools, plan demonstrations, and assist black candidates for public office. He was elected to the Raleigh City Council in 1967, thus becoming the second black person to serve on the body. As he became increasingly involved in politics, Lightner handed over the responsibilities of his funeral home to a manager. During his council tenure he served on the Law and Finance Committee and chaired a committee tasked with studying mass transit. He supported a proposal by community activists to change the election method of city council seats from an at-large model to a district system; it was later implemented after a referendum. In his third term (1971–1973) he served as Mayor pro tempore.

=== Mayor of Raleigh ===
In 1973 Lightner announced his candidacy for the office of Mayor of Raleigh. The 1973 election was the first contest in which the mayor was to be directly elected, (Note: The Mayor of Raleigh had been directly elected until 1947.) instead of being selected by the city council. The change had been made via referendum the previous year at the behest of community organizations, collectively dubbed the "Community Coalition". They felt that municipal offices were being too heavily influenced by business interests at a time when Raleigh's population was rapidly growing and various development projects were being proposed. In the election Lightner faced G. Wesley Williams, the executive director of the Raleigh Merchants Bureau who was popular among local businessmen. He characterized Williams as a lobbyist for Raleigh's business interests. Though Lightner was a black candidate in a Southern city, the topic of race did not play a significant role in the campaign. (Note: Journalist Rob Christensen attributed this to "Williams’ sense of decency, the middle-class nature of Raleigh, and Lightner's record and demeanor as a black version of the sort of respectable, not particularly exciting white businessmen who had long run the city.") He received the endorsement of the retiring mayor, Thomas W. Bradshaw, and Raleigh's two daily newspapers, the Raleigh Times and The News & Observer. Though he trailed his opponent in the primary contest by 700 votes, Lightner won the November 6 election with 17,348 votes, or 52.9 percent of the ballots, cast in his favor. His support came from a coalition of blacks—who comprised less than 16% of all registered voters—and white suburban residents who were growing increasingly concerned about urban sprawl. His victory was given national media attention, as he was the first black mayor of a large, mostly-white city in the South. (Note: Chapel Hill, North Carolina, a smaller city with a mostly-white population, elected a black mayor in 1969.) Most observers were surprised by his win.

Lightner acted as a charter member of the Southern Conference of Black Mayors. He also actively participated in the National League of Cities—including service on its steering committee—and made personal connections with members of the federal administration and other black mayors. In 1974 he devised the Downtown Housing Improvement Corporation to "help people with low incomes find housing." That year he also supported the creation of 18 neighborhood "Citizen Advisory Councils", which were meant to facilitate resident input on housing, transportation, and governmental accountability in the city. Lightner hoped that instituting the councils would also make it easier for Raleigh to earn block grants from the federal government, but this did not occur. During his mayoral tenure the city council bolstered floodplain construction regulations, rejected large road construction projects, and instituted a mass transit system. Raleigh was also bestowed with the All-America City Award during his term, with the awarding organization, the National Civic League, citing in-part the institution of the Citizen Advisory Councils. In November 1974 he supported an unsuccessful attempt to create a police review board, citing mistrust of police impartiality by "a great segment of the population".

Though his tenure was largely uncontroversial, members of Lightner's family were befallen by legal troubles. In November 1974 police arrested a woman in Pittsboro for shoplifting. Investigators found she had a notebook with the names and clothing sizes of several North Carolinians, including Clarence and Marguerite Lightner. Police theorized that the woman had been stealing items on order. On November 26, 1974, Marguerite Lightner was arrested for conspiracy to receive stolen goods; prosecutors announced they had no intentions of charging the mayor. Lightner was criticized for refusing to comment publicly on the case. Marguerite Lightner's defense attorney suggested during her trial that the prosecutor had pursued charges against her because she was the mayor's wife. She was ultimately acquitted, but in July 1975 Lightner's son, Lawrence, was found in contempt of court after allegedly making obscene gestures to a judge (Lawrence was in court to face assault charges which were later withdrawn). Announcing his bid for reelection the following month, Lightner appealed to the electorate to ignore his relatives' problems and evaluate his performance as mayor. Scrutiny was brought against him personally for urging the city to purchase a pool from his former campaign manager, and for his backing of a planning commissioner that had run afoul of local activists for maintaining close ties with real estate developers. In early October his daughter, Debra, was indicted for credit card fraud. The mayoral primary election took place the following week. Lightner faced two challengers for his position. Though they avoided discussing the Lightner family's problems, the legal troubles damaged Lightner's reputation. Jyles Coggins won the primary, and Lightner placed last with only 5,644 votes. He urged the black electorate to unify behind Coggins, and his term ended in December.

=== Later activities ===
In 1977 State Senator John W. Winters of the 14th district (representing portions of Wake, Lee and Harnett counties) resigned. Governor Jim Hunt, at the advice of the executive committee of the Democratic Party of the 14th district, appointed Lightner to fill the vacancy on August 3. He was sworn in on August 9 and served the remainder of Winters' term through 1978. Over the course of his term he cosponsored 10 bills. In 1979 he chaired the North Carolina Black Caucus. Three years later Lightner served as general chairman of the Raleigh chapter of the United Negro College Fund. In November 1983 Walter Mondale appointed him to the steering committee of the North Carolina branch of his 1984 presidential campaign. Lightner eventually rose to serve as co-chairman of the state section of the campaign. In 1986 Lightner served as co-chair of Terry Sanford's U.S. Senate campaign.

After Lightner pointed out the state of limited economic growth in southeast Raleigh, the city assembled a team under Mayor Avery C. Upchurch to promote commercial development in the area. He served as chairman of the Southeast Raleigh Improvement Commission from 1993 to 2001, where he led a study of economic development, implemented the Small Business Success Program, and created an incubation program for small businesses. He acted as chair of the Board of Trustees of Saint Augustine's College and was a member of the Board of Trustees of North Carolina State University for 10 years. Lightner attended the 1972, 1976, 1980, 1984, 1988, 1992, 1996 and 2000 Democratic National Conventions as a delegate. He retired from the funeral business in 2000.

== Death and burial ==
Lightner died at about 11:30 on July 8, 2002, at WakeMed Hospital in Raleigh after suffering from a long illness. A funeral was held at Davie Street Presbyterian Church and he was subsequently buried in Mt. Hope Cemetery in Raleigh. In April 2011 a large storm passed through Raleigh and damaged Lightner's tombstone.

== Honors and legacy ==
In May 1974 Lightner awarded an honorary doctoral degree from North Carolina Central University (formerly College). He also was granted honorary doctoral degrees from Shaw University and Saint Augustine's College. He was inducted into the Central Intercollegiate Athletic Association Hall of Fame and North Carolina Central University's Alex M. Rivera Athletics Hall of Fame in recognition of his football career.

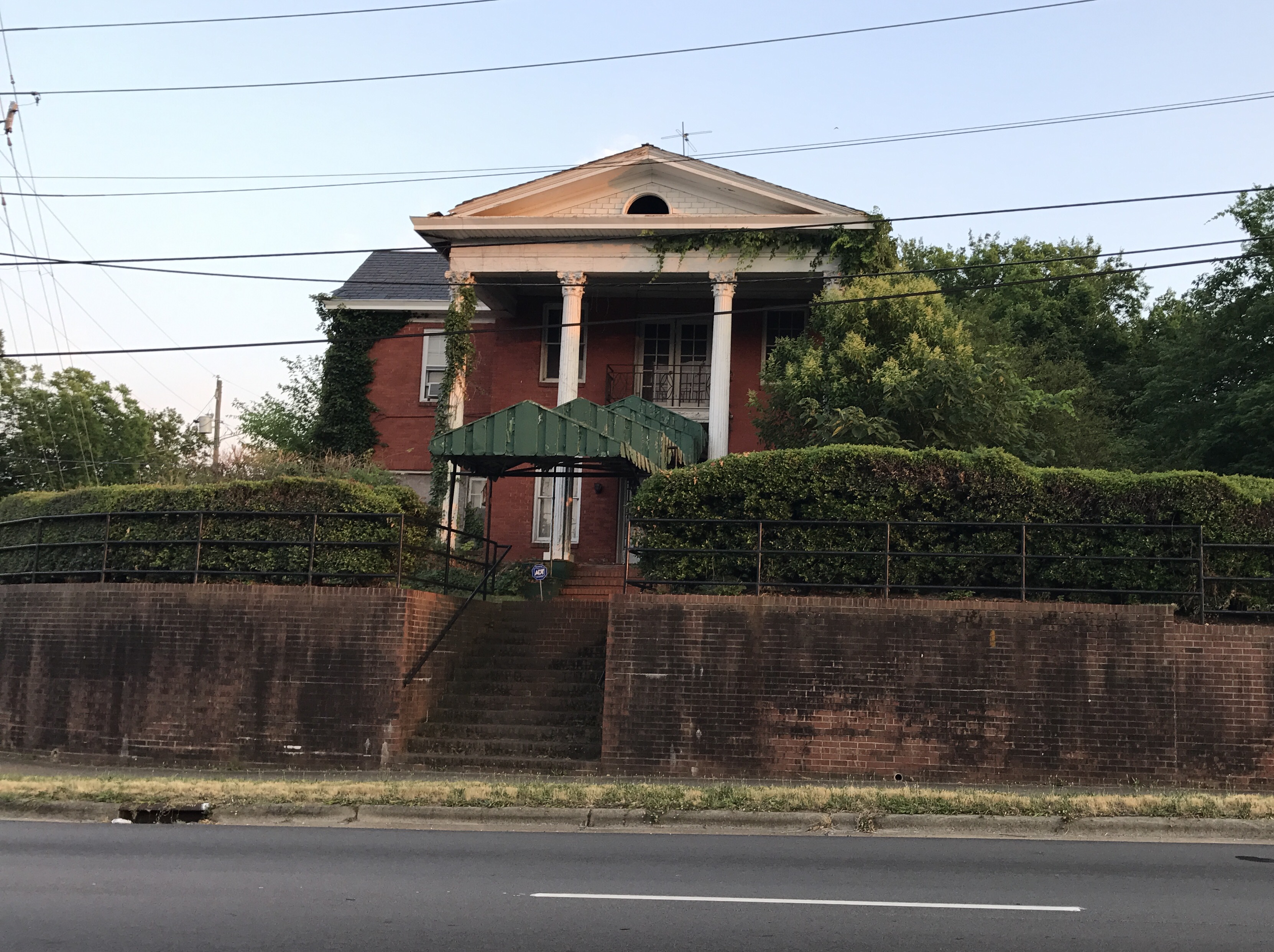
The building which has housed the Lightner Funeral Home since the 1940s

After Lightner died, Mayor Charles Meeker of Raleigh said he was, "one of Raleigh's foremost political and civic trailblazers, combining integrity, a gentle spirit and an indomitable will to make the world a better place for all people." In 2004 the Clarence E. Lightner Youth Foundation was created to teach local students the importance of civic participation. Lightner's name was added to the list of local activists honored on the Martin Luther King Water Monument, located in the Martin Luther King Jr. Memorial Gardens in Raleigh. The garden was designed by Lightner's son, Bruce.

In 2003, the North Carolina General Assembly passed a joint resolution honoring Lightner's life and achievements. That year a committee was formed in Raleigh to decide on a public space to name after Lightner. After some deliberation, it resolved to affix Lighter's name to a new public safety center to be built in the downtown. In 2010 over 250 people, led by a police detective, lobbied in an attempt to have the center named after a public safety worker instead of "a politician". After being accused of urging the change with racist motivations, the detective backed away from his suggestion and apologized. High projected costs and proposed tax increases to fund the construction of the building were met with public opposition, and in 2013 the city council abandoned the project. In 2009 Lightner was inducted into the Raleigh Hall of Fame. The following year a mural portraying prominent North Carolina African Americans was dedicated at the University of North Carolina's Knapp-Sanders Building. It included a depiction of Lightner.

In 2010 the Federal Bureau of Investigation (FBI) released several files pertaining to Jesse Helms, a conservative Republican politician who had served as a United States senator. According to the files, in 1978 the FBI was given a letter from an anonymous source which indicated that Lightner was given $10,000 to bribe black voters on behalf of Helms to not participate in that year's elections. Bruce Lightner called the allegation "ridiculous" and said, "My Daddy, like most African Americans, did not like or agree with anything Jesse Helms stood for."

== See also ==
- List of first African-American mayors
- List of mayors of Raleigh, North Carolina
