= Timeline of Raleigh, North Carolina =

The following is a timeline of the history of the city of Raleigh, North Carolina, USA.

== Prior to 19th century ==
Prior to European colonists, the area was inhabited by indigenous tribes, including the Tuscarora and Occaneechi. Explorer John Lawson mentions "Tuskeraro", "Neus", "Schoccores and Achonechy Indians" in his journal. He also mentions the devastation from illnesses like smallpox and "distemper" on the native population which killed entire towns and left one sixth the original population in the area.

- 1587 – In a venture sponsored by Sir Walter Raleigh, John White and a group of colonists land on Roanoke Island at the site of a former, abandoned settlement to found the "Cittie of Raleigh," about 190 miles from present-day Raleigh, NC. John White returns to England for supplies, leaving behind his granddaughter Virginia Dare, the first English child born in the New World.
- 1590 – His return delayed by threats against England by the Spanish Armada, John White secures passage on a privateer. As the party stepped ashore, there was no sign of the colonists except the letters "CROATOAN" carved on a tree. This abandoned site later became known as the "Lost Colony."
- 1701 – John Lawson, English explorer, led a 600-mile expedition starting in Charleston, SC and ending at the mouth of the Pamlico River. His journey took him close to the site of what later became Raleigh, NC.
- 1770 – Joel Lane, a planter, successfully lobbies the colonial General Assembly to create Wake County.
- 1781 – Lane's property was the setting for a session of the state General Assembly. At this time the settlement was known as Wake Courthouse, or Bloomsbury and contained a courthouse, a jail, a tavern or inn, and a log church called the Asbury Meetinghouse.
- 1792
  - The NC legislature authorizes the purchase of 1,000 acres (4 km2) of Joel Lane's land upon which to establish the city of "Raleigh" as the new center of state government.
  - Raleigh is founded as the capital of North Carolina.
- 1794
  - State House built.
  - December: State General Assembly convenes.
- 1798 – Cemetery established.
- 1799 – The North-Carolina Minerva and Raleigh advertiser relocates from Fayetteville to become the first Raleigh Newspaper.
- 1800 – Raleigh population is 669.

== 19th century ==
- 1801 – Raleigh Academy established.
- 1804 – Casso's Inn opens.
- 1813 – State Bank of North Carolina built.
- 1817 – Episcopal Diocese of North Carolina established in Raleigh
- 1819 – Raleigh Auxiliary Society for Colonizing the Free People of Colour of the United States established.
- 1820 – Population: 2,674.
- 1831
  - January: A great fire destroys the capitol building.
  - June: Capitol building burns down.
- 1840
  - Raleigh and Gaston Railroad begins operating.
  - North Carolina State Capitol building constructed.
- 1842 - Saint Mary's School (Raleigh, North Carolina) founded by the Episcopal Church.
- 1846 – Raleigh Guards established.
- 1850 – Charles Lee Smith house built.
- 1853 – Christ Episcopal Church built.
- 1857
  - William Dallas Haywood becomes mayor.
  - Peace Institute founded.
- 1861 – May 20: North Carolina secedes from the United States and joins the Confederate States of America.
- 1865
  - April 13: Raleigh taken by Union forces.
  - Raleigh Institute founded.
  - Daily Sentinel newspaper begins publication.
- 1867 - St. Augustine's University (North Carolina) founded.
- 1868 – July 4: North Carolina readmitted to the United States.
- 1874 – Church of the Good Shepherd breaks away from Christ Church
- 1875 – Institute for Colored Deaf, Dumb and Blind built.
- 1878 – Court Room and Post Office built.
- 1880 – The News & Observer in publication.
- 1881 – Tabernacle Baptist Church built.
- 1887 - Raleigh Water Works built
- 1889 – North Carolina College of Agriculture and Mechanic Arts opens.
- 1890 – Union Station built.
- 1891
  - North Carolina Confederate Soldiers’ Home opens.
  - Baptist Female University chartered.
  - Electric streetcar begins operating.
  - Governor's Mansion built.
- 1892 – Centennial of city founding.
- 1898 – First-Citizens Bank & Trust Company established.
- 1900
  - North Carolina Literary and Historical Association founded.
  - Population: 13,643.

== 20th century ==
=== 1900s-1940s ===
- 1901 – Raney Memorial Library opens.
- 1903 – North Carolina Division of Archives and History headquartered in Raleigh.
- 1904 – Raleigh Woman's Club founded.
- 1905 – James I. Johnson becomes mayor.
- 1910
  - Population: 19,218.
  - Carolina Country Club founded
- 1912 – City Auditorium opens.
- 1913 – State Supreme Court Building constructed.
- 1914 – Daughters of the American Revolution Caswell-Nash Chapter formed.
- 1915 – North Carolina Division of Parks and Recreation headquartered in Raleigh.
- 1920
  - City area expanded.
  - Population: 27,076.
- 1922 – WPTF radio begins broadcasting.
- 1923 – State Agricultural Building constructed.
- 1924
  - State Theatre opens.
  - Roman Catholic Diocese of Raleigh officially established
- 1929 – Raleigh Municipal Airport opens.
- 1930 – The Mecca Restaurant opens.
- 1932 – Raleigh Memorial Auditorium opens.
- 1936 – Raleigh Little Theatre established.
- 1938
  - State Office Building constructed.
  - Cooper's Barbeque in business.
- 1940 – Carolinian newspaper begins publication.
- 1943 – Raleigh–Durham Airport opens.
- 1945 – Area of city: 12.5 square miles.
- 1948 – Hi-Mount developed.
- 1949 – Cameron Village shopping centre in business.

=== 1950s-1990s ===
- 1950
  - Southern Railway station built.
  - Population: 65,679.
- 1951 – York Industrial Center established near city.
- 1952 – Southland Speedway opens.
- 1954 – Farm Bureau Insurance Company building constructed.
- 1955 – Raleigh Farmers Market built.
- 1956
  - WRAL-TV (television) begins broadcasting.
  - North Carolina Museum of Art opens.
  - Occidental Life Insurance Company building constructed.
- 1959 – Research Triangle Park development begins near city.
- 1960
  - Student Nonviolent Coordinating Committee founded in Raleigh.
  - First Federal Bank Building constructed.
- 1961 – Center Drive-In cinema active.
- 1962 – Northwestern Mutual Insurance Company building constructed.
- 1965 – Area of city: 34.1 square miles.
- 1967
  - North Hills Mall in business.
  - North Ridge Country Club built
- 1970 – Population: 122,830.
- 1971 – The Micajah Bullock Chapter of the Daughters of the American Revolution formed.
- 1972
  - Crabtree Valley Mall in business.
  - State Bank of Raleigh and Capital Area Preservation nonprofit established.
- 1975 – Raleigh Transit Authority established.
- 1977 – Isabella Cannon becomes mayor.
- 1978 – Haywood Hall Museum House established.
- 1979 – Jain Study Center of North Carolina founded.
- 1980 – Artsplosure begins.
- 1985 – Piedmont Zen Group formed.
- 1986 – Sister city relationship established with Hull, UK.
- 1987 – David Price becomes U.S. representative for North Carolina's 4th congressional district.
- 1988 – 1988 Raleigh tornado outbreak.
- 1989 – Sister city relationship established with Compiègne, France.
- 1990 – Population: 207,951.
- 1993 – Raleigh City Museum opens.
- 1995 – Historic Oak View County Park established.
- 1998 – Animazement convention begins.
- 1999 – 1999 Special Olympics World Summer Games.
- 2000 – Population: 276,093.

== 21st century ==
=== 2000s ===
- 2001
  - November: Raleigh mayoral election, 2001 held.
  - December: Charles Meeker becomes mayor.
  - Sister city relationship established with Rostock, Germany.
- 2002 – Triangle Town Center shopping mall in business.
- 2005 – Raleigh Home Movie Day begins.
- 2007 – Marbles Kids Museum opens.
- 2008
  - Raleigh Public Record in publication.
  - David Price becomes U.S. representative for North Carolina's 4th congressional district again.
  - Sister city relationship established with Xiangyang, China.

=== 2010s ===
- 2010 – Population: 403,892.
- 2011
  - Tornado outbreak of April 14–16, 2011.
  - Contemporary Art Museum of Raleigh opens.
  - Nancy McFarlane becomes mayor.
- 2012 – Sister city relationship established with Nairobi, Kenya.
- 2013 – April: Moral Mondays protest begins.
- 2017 – Fire breaks out at Downtown Raleigh building, the largest the city has seen since the 1920s

=== 2020s ===
- 2020 – Population: 467,665.
- 2022 – The 2022 Raleigh shootings occur, leaving five people dead and injuring two others.

== See also ==
- Raleigh history
- List of mayors of Raleigh, North Carolina
- Wake County history
- National Register of Historic Places listings in Wake County, North Carolina
- List of museums in Raleigh, North Carolina
- History of North Carolina
- Timelines of other cities in North Carolina: Asheville, Charlotte, Durham, Fayetteville, Greensboro, Wilmington, Winston-Salem

== Bibliography ==
=== Published in 18th century ===
- John Lawson (1709). A New Voyage to Carolina; Containing the Exact Description and Natural History of That Country: Together with the Present State Thereof. And A Journal of a Thousand Miles, Travel'd Thro' Several Nations of Indians. Giving a Particular Account of Their Customs, Manners, &c. London.

=== Published in 19th century ===
- Bishop Davenport (1838). "Raleigh". Pocket Gazetteer, or, Traveller's Guide through North America and the West Indies. Philadelphia: George & Byington. hdl:2027/uc2.ark:/13960/t9k35ng8g.
- R.H. Long (1863), "Raleigh", Hunt's Gazetteer of the Border and Southern States, Pittsburgh, Pa.: John P. Hunt
- Raleigh Directory. 1875
  - 1883
  - 1896
- "Wake County". Branson's North Carolina Business Directory. 1884.
  - 1896
- Kemp Plummer Battle (1893). Early History of Raleigh. Raleigh: Edwards and Broughton, printers.

=== Published in 20th century ===
- Raleigh Directory. 1903
  - 1927
- Moses Neal Amis (1913). Historical Raleigh. Raleigh, NC: Commercial Printing Company.
- Hope Summerell Chamberlain (1922). History of Wake County, North Carolina. Raleigh: Edwards & Broughton Printing Co.
- Federal Writers’ Project (1939). "Raleigh". North Carolina: A Guide to the Old North State. American Guide Series. p. 233+.
- Lawrence Wodehouse (1967). "Alfred B. Mullett's Court Room and Post Office at Raleigh, North Carolina". Journal of the Society of Architectural Historians. 26 (4): 301–305. doi:10.2307/988457. JSTOR 988457.
- Steven Stolpen, Raleigh: A Pictorial History (Norfolk, 1977).
- Ory Mazar Nergal, ed. (1980), "Raleigh, NC", Encyclopedia of American Cities, New York: E.P. Dutton, p. 274+, OL 4120668M
- Elizabeth Reid Murray, Wake: Capital County of North Carolina, Vol.1 of Prehistory through Centennial (Raleigh, 1983)
- R.B., Reeves III, ed., Raleigh 1792-1992: A Bicentennial Celebration of North Carolina's Capital City (Raleigh, 1992)
- Candy Lee Metz Beal, Raleigh: The First 200 Years (Raleigh, 1992)
- Linda Harris Edminsten and Linda Simmons-Henry, Culture Town: Life in Raleigh's African American Communities (Raleigh, 1993)
- David Perkins, ed., The News and Observer's Raleigh: A Living History of North Carolina's Capital (Winston-Salem, 1994)

=== Published in 21st century ===
- Jennifer A. Kulikowski and Kenneth E. Peters, Images of America: Historic Raleigh (Charleston, 2002)
- William S. Powell, ed. (2006), "Raleigh", Encyclopedia of North Carolina, University of North Carolina Press (via NCpedia)
- "Post-World War II and Modern Architecture in Raleigh, North Carolina, 1945-1965" (PDF), Multiple Property Documentation Form, National Register of Historic Places, United States Department of the Interior, National Park Service, 2009
- "36 Hours in Raleigh, N.C." New York Times. March 6, 2014.
- Raj Chetty; Nathaniel Hendren (2015), City Rankings, Commuting Zones: Causal Effects of the 100 Largest Commuting Zones on Household Income in Adulthood, Equality of Opportunity Project, Harvard University, archived from the original on May 6, 2015, "Rank #95: Raleigh, North Carolina"
