= Seby B. Jones =

American politician

32nd Mayor of Raleigh, North Carolina
- In office 1969–1971
- Preceded by: Travis H. Tomlinson
- Succeeded by: Thomas W. Bradshaw

Member of the Raleigh City Council
- In office 1967–1969

Personal details
- Born: August 4, 1915
- Died: June 7, 2002 (aged 86)

Seby Brown Jones (August 4, 1915 – June 7, 2002) was a businessman who served as mayor of Raleigh, North Carolina for one term (1969-1971) and co-founded the Davidson and Jones Construction Company.

== Early life ==
Seby Jones was born on a farm in Franklin County, North Carolina. He was born one of 12 children. At the age of 16, he moved out of Franklin County to Selma, North Carolina joining his older brother. Together they formed a small service station and fruit stand business. The small business was stocked with surplus produce from truckers moving north-south on US 301. Seby Jones had five children. In 1933, during the Great Depression, Seby Jones moved the family to Raleigh so that he could get a more stable career then re-selling produce. At Raleigh, he met a Scottish immigrant carpenter, James A. Davidson, who took him as his assistant. The assistant position helped teach Jones how to create a business from the bottom up.

== Business career ==
During World War II, Jones worked on several structures related to the war including the Raleigh-Durham Airport. After the war, in 1945 he returned to the private sector with new construction experience. Along with James Davidson, he formed the Davidson and Jones Construction Company. In post-war years, their company helped renovate and build many supermarkets and stores including over 100 churches. In 1965 Davidson retired from the company leaving Jones as the President-Chairman of the construction company. The company planned and built the Crabtree Mall, which opened in 1972.

== Political career ==
Seby Jones was elected to the Raleigh City Council in 1967. Which he served until 1969 when he was elected as the Mayor of Raleigh. While Seby Jones was mayor, the city expanded a lot past its pre-war boundaries. While mayor, he also helped the city continue to get through the civil rights era and prompted by the influx of new people coming to work in Research Triangle Park. Under Jones administration, he made setting five-year goals for the City government and the establishment of the Office of Intergovernmental Coordinator whose mission was to ensure that all Raleigh citizens have access to local, state and federal agencies and funds to improve their neighborhoods and their lives.

== Later life ==
Jones regarded the improvement of race relations one of his most important achievements in life. His efforts led to an increased interest in philanthropy and college scholarships for deserving students. In 1972 Jones was invited to join St. Augustine's University's Delta Mu Delta National Honor Society which he later served the Board of Trustees on. Jones also served on the Board of Trustees at Meredith College. He also supported many organizations including the Raleigh Rescue Mission, Lions Club, Boy Scouts of America and The Gideons International.

== Death ==
Seby Brown Jones died June 7, 2002, aged 86. He is buried at the Raleigh Memorial Park.

The Christina and Seby Jones Chapel at Meredith College was named to honor Seby and his wife in 1982. The Seby Jones Performing Arts Center at Louisburg College, the Seby B. Jones Fine Arts Center at St. Augustine's College, and the Seby B. Jones Cancer Center at Appalachian State University is named in his memory.

Preceded by Travis H. Tomlinson	Mayor of Raleigh; 1969– 1971	Succeeded by Thomas W. Bradshaw
