= Jyles Coggins =

American politician

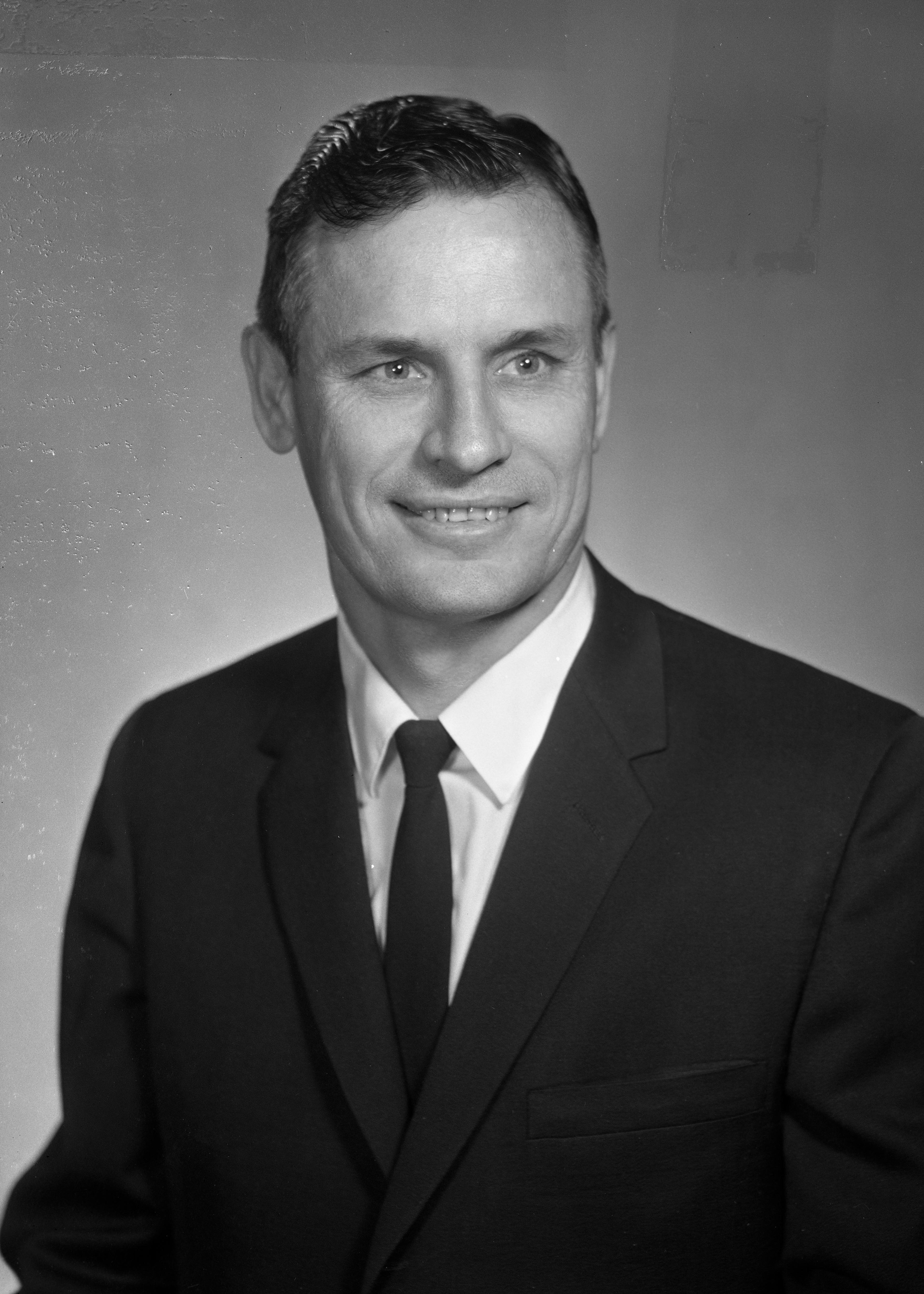
- Portrait of Coggins c. 1963

31st Mayor of Raleigh, North Carolina
- In office December 9, 1975 – December 1977
- Preceded by: Clarence Lightner
- Succeeded by: Isabella Cannon

Member of the North Carolina Senate from the 12th district
- In office 1965–1971

Member of the North Carolina House of Representatives
- In office 1963–1965

Personal details
- Born: Jyles Jackson Coggins; January 10, 1921 Mooresville, North Carolina, United States
- Died: August 25, 2011 (aged 90) Raleigh, North Carolina, United States
- Party: Democratic
- Spouse: Frances Katherine Lyon Coggins

Military service
- Allegiance: United States
- Branch/service: United States Marine Corps
- Years of service: 1942–1946

Jyles Jackson Coggins (January 10, 1921 – August 25, 2011) was an American real estate developer and politician who served in the North Carolina House of Representatives and North Carolina Senate. He served as the Mayor of Raleigh, North Carolina from 1975 until 1977.

Coggins was born to a poor family in 1921 in Iredell County, North Carolina, United States. He moved to Chapel Hill in 1939 to pursue a university education, but dropped out due to ill health and took up various jobs. He enlisted in the United States Marine Corps in 1942 and fought in World War II as a bomber pilot. Following his discharge in 1946, Coggins moved to Raleigh to resume his education. He shortly thereafter abandoned his studies to start his own construction company. Over time the business grew and completed projects across the southeastern United States, and Coggins became a millionaire. In 1963 he, a conservative Democrat, was elected to the North Carolina House of Representatives. Two years later he was elected to the North Carolina Senate. Over the course of his legislative career he advocated for the disabled and opposed liquor, pornography, and coed dormitories on state university campuses. He also frequently disregarded the wishes of state Democratic leaders, earning a reputation as a maverick. Coggins left the Senate in 1971 and unsuccessfully sought a seat in the U.S. House of Representatives the following year.

Coggins was elected Mayor of Raleigh in 1975. During his tenure, the Raleigh City Council was split evenly between members aligned with community and environmental activists who wanted to limit the city's growth and others who represented business interests and sought to promote development. The division brought about frequent clashing between Coggins—who had an abrasive, uncompromising style and supported further development in Raleigh—and members of the council. He was challenged in his 1977 reelection bid by Isabella Cannon, who ran at the behest of a coalition of community activists. Coggins frequently attacked the coalition throughout the campaign. Despite having the endorsement of Raleigh's two newspapers and outspending his opponent, he lost the election. He died on August 25, 2011.

== Early life ==
Jyles Coggins was born on January 10, 1921, in Mooresville, Iredell County, North Carolina, United States to James Lee Coggins and Jeanette Arney. He was the third of five children in a poor family. Both of his parents worked at the Kannapolis Cotton Mill. When Coggins was thirteen years old his father died, and he moved to Statesville to work on a farm, sending a portion of his income back to his family to support it. He graduated from Iredell County's Central High School in 1939.

Coggins hitchhiked from his family's farm to Chapel Hill to attend the University of North Carolina at Chapel Hill. He studied at the school from 1939 until 1940, when he was forced to drop out due to ill health. He then worked a variety of jobs (Note: By his own account, Coggins' different positions included salesman, janitor, airplane factory inspector, and railroad brakeman.) before enlisting in the United States Marine Corps in June 1942. Seeking to become an aviator, he undertook training courses in Chapel Hill; Anacostia, Maryland; and Pensacola, Florida, and was commissioned as a lieutenant on August 17. He completed his operational flight training on November 6 and was subsequently sent to San Diego to join American forces moving out for deployment in World War II. Coggins served as a bomber pilot and fought in the South Pacific, earning ten military awards, including two Distinguished Flying Crosses. Coggins became known as "Bomber Jack" to his fellow Marines during the war and garnered the rank of First Lieutenant before he was discharged in 1946. Coggins returned to North Carolina and enrolled in North Carolina State College in Raleigh, building his own duplex to reside in while he pursued his studies. Anticipating a post-war construction boom, he dropped out in 1947 to pursue a career in contracting. (Note: According to Coggins' daughter, Judy, he later regretted that he had failed to graduate from a university.)

Coggins married Frances Katherine Lyon on September 24, 1943, in Jacksonville, Florida. They had five daughters together. Coggins was a Presbyterian Christian, and was a member of a masonic lodge, the Benevolent and Protective Order of Elks, the American Legion, and the Raleigh Civitan Club.

== Commercial career ==
Coggins founded the Coggins Construction Company. His first projects were small duplexes. Over time Coggins gradually expanded his building work to include apartment complexes and government buildings. His construction company completed projects across the southeastern United States, including development at Marine Corps Air Station Cherry Point and the erection of Beckanna Apartments, an eight-story, 250-unit housing complex on Glenwood Avenue in Raleigh which he named for two of his daughters. Coggins later engaged in real estate speculation. Believing that U.S. Route 70 would become an important channel of commercial activity between Raleigh and Durham, he began to purchase land along the highway, eventually amassing over 250 acres. He leased some of the land in the area and oversaw a significant amount of real estate development along the road, sometimes provoking the ire of local residents. He also founded the Lyon Equipment Company and Dob's, Inc.

Coggins frequently attended to his business, and he had little spare time to interact with friends and family or engage in leisurely activities. Over the course of his career he became a millionaire. His newfound wealth allowed him to purchase a large home and 16-acres of land in western Raleigh. He founded Raleigh Memorial Park, a cemetery. His last development project was the erection of a large mausoleum in the cemetery. Coggins had wanted to build such a structure since the 1950s but never had any commercial support to do so, and decided to personally construct it in the early 1990s. He dedicated it to his wife.

Coggins served as chairman of the board of Textile Research Services, Inc.. He was also a member of the National Association of Cemeteries, North Carolina Cemetery Association, Raleigh Merchants Bureau, Raleigh Chamber of Commerce, North Carolina Association of Quality Restaurants, North Carolina Motel Association, Association of General Contractors, Raleigh Board of Realtors, and the Brotherhood of Railroad Trainmen.

== Legislative career ==
In 1963 Coggins sought a seat in the North Carolina House of Representatives. Affiliating with the Democratic Party, he styled himself as a conservative and won election. Coggins was then elected to the 12th district seat in North Carolina Senate, representing Wake County, in 1965. He won re-election to the Senate in 1967 and 1969, serving until 1971. In the 1969–1970 legislative session, he served as chairman of both the Senate Appropriations Committee on Health, Welfare and Institutional Care, and the Senate Committee on Libraries. Over the course of his time in the legislature, he advocated for the disabled and opposed liquor, pornography, and coed dormitories on state university campuses. In 1971 he introduced a bill that would prohibit students from visiting opposite sex dormitories on state university campuses, but it was defeated in committee. Throughout his tenure he gained a reputation as a maverick, frequently ignoring the wishes of state Democratic leaders. Speaking about his legislative career in 1975, he said, "I was not a special-interest legislator. I was never bothered by lobbyists much in the legislature."

In 1972 Coggins sought the U.S. House of Representatives seat from North Carolina's 4th congressional district. He lost the Democratic Party's nomination to Ike Franklin Andrews in a primary election.

== Mayoral career ==
=== 1975 campaign ===
In the 1970s citizens of Raleigh became increasingly concerned about the city's rapid population growth and the consequences of unchecked real estate development. These people formed civic and neighborhood associations which unified as a collective political bloc, the Community Coalition, that supported a more managed process for dealing with Raleigh's expansion. The coalition's electoral strength contributed to the election of Clarence Lightner as Mayor of Raleigh in 1973.

In 1975, Coggins sought the office of Mayor, challenging Lightner, whose reputation had suffered from family legal troubles, though Coggins did not openly discuss them. He emphasized during his campaign that he had never maintained a campaigning organization on his behalf or accepted a political donation, noting that his "loner" status in politics made him less suspicious than other candidates with potential ties to real estate developers. He placed first in the October mayoral primary election, earning 10,201 votes. Lightner placed third. He withdrew from the race and endorsed Coggins. Coggins faced City Councilman J. Oliver Williams in the November 4 election, who had the support of the Community Coalition. According to some reports, Coggins initially sought the support of some coalition members, but failed. He resorted to criticizing the bloc, accusing it of trying to take over the municipal government. Two local black voters' groups, the Raleigh Wake Citizens Association and the Wake County Black Democratic Political Caucus, endorsed him. Coggins won the election with 55 percent of the votes cast in his favor.

=== Tenure ===
Coggins assumed office on December 9, 1975. During his tenure, the eight-member Raleigh City Council was split evenly between members aligned with community and environmental activists who wanted to limit the city's growth and others who represented business interests and sought to promote development. The division brought about frequent clashing between Coggins—who had an abrasive, uncompromising style and supported further development in Raleigh—and members of the council. The disagreement emerged during the City Council's first meeting in December when Coggins called for a vote on the reelection of a returning member as mayor pro tempore. The four city council members supported by the Community Coalition asked that the vote be postponed until a later meeting when they could consider assigning all other leadership roles on the council. Coggins' disregarded their wish and proceeded with the vote, which tied among the councilmen. After breaking the tie with his own vote, Coggins angrily declared "If we're going to have division, let's bring it to a head right now." He then told the four councilmen backed by the coalition, "I refuse to be intimidated. I refuse to be coerced. And I will not be dictated to by any group regardless of who supports it." He later clarified that the "group" he alluded to was the Community Coalition. Relations between Coggins and the council remained tense throughout the rest of his term. The councilmen hotly debated whether the mayor should be empowered to refer proposals to committees without the council's consent. Coggins disagreed with the council about revisions to Raleigh's city charter, pushing for the abolition of the Community Advisory Council, a board which represented neighborhood civic associations. During his tenure the city council also failed to produce a plan for addressing Raleigh's development and growth. The frequent disagreement between Coggins and the council greatly contributed to the eventual resignation of one city councilman and the decision of two others to not seek reelection. While mayor, he also defeated a strike undertaken by black sanitation workers attempting to unionize and established a committee to examine the city's housing inspections department. On July 31, 1976, he was awarded an honorary doctor of law from Shaw University.

=== 1977 reelection campaign ===
Coggins sought reelection in 1977. He was challenged by a grassroots candidate, Isabella Cannon, who ran for the mayoral office at the behest of the Raleigh Coalition, a successor group to the Community Coalition. On September 13 Coggins, Cannon, and other candidates for municipal offices attended a forum hosted by the coalition. In his opening statement Coggins declared that he was not pursuing the coalition's endorsement, and characterized the group as "a self-appointed, self-anointed group of people serving as an ad hoc city council in exile." At the forum's end he dismissed the event as a "farce". Cannon and the other candidates used their time to discuss local issues, and on September 20 the coalition endorsed Cannon.

"My opponent is an honorable, well-intentioned lady. Unfortunately, she is being used by a noisy group of people who place very narrow, selfish interests above the well-being of the entire City of Raleigh."

— Snippet from a newspaper ad published by Coggins during the 1977 Raleigh mayoral campaign

In the early weeks of the campaign, Coggins discussed Raleigh's need for jobs and his experience in business. Throughout its duration, he emphasized his political experience as mayor and as a legislator. He also frequently criticized the Raleigh Coalition for being "anti-growth". Some observers believed that Coggins attacked the coalition instead of Cannon directly because he was hesitant to speak poorly of an elderly woman. Coggins initially denied that this was the case, but later said, "I still think a gentleman should treat a lady as a lady."

Coggins spent $12,000 of his own money on his campaign effort, the most of any candidate for Raleigh municipal office in the 1977 election. He received the endorsement of the city's two daily newspapers, The Raleigh News and Observer and The Raleigh Times, as well as the support of the Raleigh Wake Citizens Association. The Wake County Black Democratic Political Caucus endorsed Cannon. During the final week of the campaign, Coggins spent $9,000 on newspaper advertisements, including $4,000 on four full-page ads. In an upset, Cannon defeated Coggins in the November 8 election, 14,508 votes to 13,315. Coggins won only 15 of Raleigh's 43 precincts, performing best in the wealthier neighborhood constituencies as well as the working-class areas of the eastern part of the city. Various theories were offered as to why Coggins lost. G. Wesley Williams, director of the Raleigh Merchants Bureau, believed that Coggins "blew it" by repeatably delivering "vitriolic statements" throughout his tenure. Journalists believed the split of the black vote—which had previously unified behind Coggins—contributed to his defeat. Coggins attributed his failure to the campaigning done by the Raleigh Coalition as well as negative press coverage of himself. His term ended in December. Reflecting on his political career in 1998, Coggins said, "I never looked at politics as a profession. It was more of a hobby, my chance to give something back to the community since I had no talent for volunteering [for civic groups]."

== Later life ==
Coggins flew aircraft as a hobby after World War II, and continued doing so into his 70s. On February 8, 1978, Governor Jim Hunt appointed him to the North Carolina Cemetery Commission. Coggins' wife died in 1995 and he subsequently developed insomnia. He sold Raleigh Memorial Park in 1996. Coggins died at his home in western Raleigh on the evening of August 25, 2011. He was survived by his five daughters, 15 grandchildren, and one great-grandson.

== Citations ==
Political offices
| Preceded by Clarence Lightner | Mayor of Raleigh; 1975–1977 | Succeeded by Isabella Cannon |
