= William G. Enloe =

American businessman and politician

Mayor of Raleigh, North Carolina
- In office July 1, 1957 – June 30, 1963
- Preceded by: Fred B. Wheeler
- Succeeded by: James W. Reid

Member of the Raleigh City Council
- In office 1953–1957
- In office 1971 – November 22, 1972
- Preceded by: Thomas W. Bradshaw
- Succeeded by: Edith Reid

Personal details
- Born: June 15, 1902 Rock Hill, South Carolina, U.S.
- Died: November 22, 1972 (aged 70) Raleigh, North Carolina, U.S.
- Resting place: Historic Oakwood Cemetery
- Party: Democratic Party
- Spouse: Ruth Erskine
- Children: 2

William Gilmore "Bill" Enloe (June 15, 1902 – November 22, 1972) was an American businessman and politician who served as the Mayor of Raleigh, North Carolina from 1957 to 1963. Enloe was born in South Carolina and sold popcorn before moving to North Carolina and taking up work with North Carolina Theatres, Inc. In 1953 he was elected to the City Council of Raleigh. Four years later he was elected Mayor. During his tenure the American South was permeated by civil unrest due to racial segregation. Considered a moderate on civil rights, Enloe criticized black demonstrators and resisted efforts to integrate the theaters he managed, but he eventually compromised and appointed a committee to oversee the desegregation of Raleigh businesses. He left office in 1963, but returned to the city council in 1971. He died the following year. William G. Enloe High School in Raleigh was named in his honor.

== Biography ==
William Gilmore Enloe was born on June 15, 1902, in Rock Hill, South Carolina, United States. He started working by selling popcorn at the Bijou Theatre in Greenville when he was 12 years old. In 1927 he managed two theaters in Greensboro, North Carolina until November when he was transferred to Raleigh to manage two theaters there. He later became the eastern district manager for North Carolina Theatres, Inc./Wilby-Kincey Theaters. He spent a total of 55 years in cinema-related business and served as a director of the N.C. Association of Theater Owners.

=== Political career ===
In 1951 Enloe unsuccessfully sought a seat on the City Council of Raleigh, placing 10th in the primary election. Two years later he was elected to the body. In the spring of 1956 he was appointed to chair the "Let's Talk Sense Fund" to raise money for Adlai Stevenson II's presidential campaign. In August he attended the Democratic Party's national convention in Chicago in his capacity as a delegate. He was elected Mayor of Raleigh the following year, succeeding Fred B. Wheeler on July 1, 1957. That year he was also elected to the executive committee of the American Municipal Association, but he later left after choosing not to seek reelection. City councilman Jesse Helms disliked Enloe's leadership style, referring to him as the "Enloe Steamroller".

Enloe initially stated he would not seek reelection as Mayor, but later reversed his position and re-secured the office in 1961, becoming the city's first mayor elected to a third term under its council–manager government. That spring the City Council resolved to ban ice cream trucks from operating on Raleigh's streets. Enloe supported the measure, citing increased road traffic and safety concerns for children. A United Press International report brought the event national attention, and Enloe received letters from across the country both praising and criticizing the council's action. In January 1963 he declared with "mixed emotions" that he would not seek reelection to the city council in May and thus not continue to serve in his "strenuous and time-consuming" role as Mayor. His mayoral term ended on June 30, and he was succeeded by James W. Reid the following day.

Enloe remained affiliated with North Carolina Theatres, Inc. during his mayoral tenure. In the spring of 1963 he led a successful lobbying effort in the North Carolina House of Representatives to defeat a bill that would require the state to observe daylight saving time. He also held the office of President of the North Carolina League of Municipalities, was a member of the Governor's School Study Commission, served as Secretary-Treasurer of the Mayors' Association of Wake County, was a member of the executive committee of the Governor's Highway Safety Conference, and served as chairman of the Raleigh School Board. In 1964 Enloe sought a seat in the North Carolina Senate for the 16th District. In the May 30 Democratic primary election he received 14,191 votes, narrowly placing third. In the second primary on July 11 he placed third by a wider margin and was defeated for the two Democratic nominations. In 1969 he unsuccessfully lobbied against the introduction of cable television services in Raleigh on the grounds that they would harm the theater business. He briefly served again as a Raleigh city councilman from 1971 until his death.

==== Civil rights issues ====
During his time as mayor, Enloe was considered moderate on the issue of race relations. In 1960 he criticized black students who participated in the Greensboro sit-ins in protest of racial segregation at lunch counters, calling it "regrettable that some of our young Negro students would risk endangering [black and white] relations by seeking to change a long-standing custom in a manner that is all but destined to fail." In March he appointed a 15-member biracial committee to negotiate an end to desegregation demonstrations. The following month a white youth protesting segregated lunch counters in Raleigh was assaulted by a passerby. In response, Enloe convened an extraordinary session of the City Council to consider an ordinance that imposed restrictions on picketing, commenting that some demonstrators had been blocking the sidewalks in the downtown. The biracial committee announced the integration of lunch counters in August, prompting the mayor to comment, "I appreciate the spirit of cooperation shown by all concerned and am proud of the acceptance shown by our citizens."

It's time to act. Let's not settle this thing by laws or creeds but by being human beings dealing with one another.

— Mayor William G. Enloe, May 9, 1963

In the spring of 1963 the American South was subject to a wave of violence, demonstrations, and mass arrests spurred by racial tension. In early May, several Raleigh protests resulted in dozens of detentions. Enloe, wanting to "avoid another Birmingham", appointed a biracial "Committee of One Hundred" to resolve the city's civil rights issues. Most of Raleigh's businesses were desegregated within the following year. Among the targets of some anti-segregation demonstrators were cinemas owned by North Carolina Theatres, which were designed to accommodate Jim Crow-era segregation with separate seating arrangements. Enloe initially resisted the integration efforts. Student activists felt he was resistant to change and unwilling to support integration. In 1961 he, in his capacity as district manager for North Carolina Theatres, negotiated the integration of the Carolina Theatre in Chapel Hill with the Chapel Hill Human Relations Committee, thus allowing it to become the first all-white movie theatre in the South to desegregate. A standoff between him and protesters over the Ambassador Theater in Raleigh prompted Enloe to announce his intention to resign from office. He only withdrew his resignation after negotiations with black community leaders which were mediated by City Councilman John W. Winters. Eventually, in a meeting with United States Attorney General Robert F. Kennedy and the head of his cinema company, it was agreed to begin the desegregation of the cinemas he managed, starting with those in Greensboro, then Winston-Salem, Charlotte, Durham, and finally Raleigh.

=== Health issues and death ===
In August 1964 Enloe was hospitalized for a blood clot in his left eye. He suffered a heart attack on November 2, 1972, while attending a North Carolina League of Municipalities convention in Greensboro. He died 20 days later at Rex Hospital in Raleigh. He is buried next to his wife, Ruth Erskine Enloe, in Raleigh's Historic Oakwood Cemetery. They had a son, William G. Enloe Jr., and a daughter, Ruth Enloe.

== Legacy ==
Enloe ... was considered during his time to be a progressive mayor with a businessman's point of view. His tenure was marked by the integration of Raleigh's schools in 1960 and sit-ins by black college students to protest racially segregated businesses.

— T. Keung Hui and Thomas Goldsmith, 2010

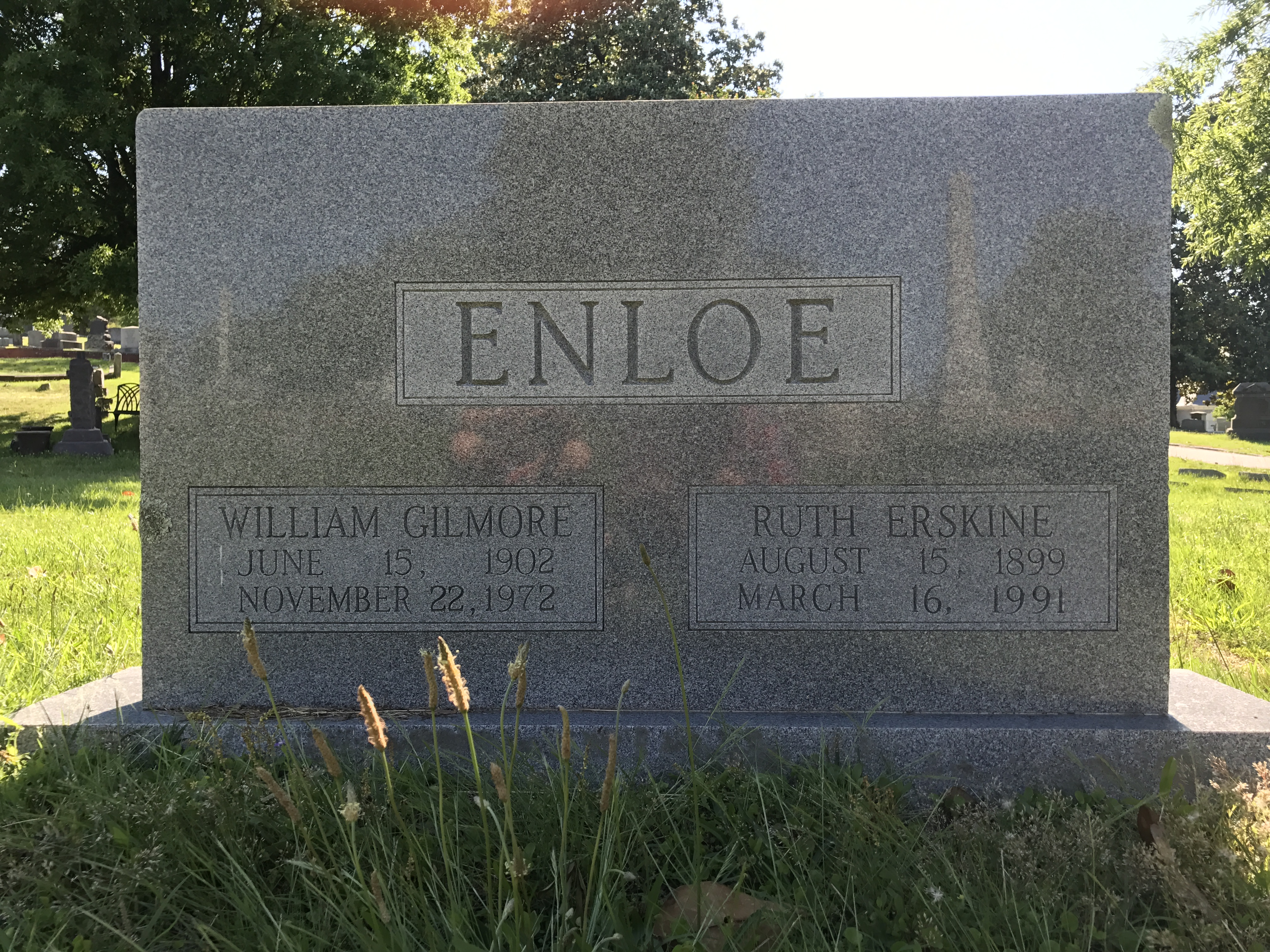
Headstone of Enloe in Oakwood Cemetery

In 1961, the Raleigh School Board voted to name a new school after Enloe. William G. Enloe High School opened the following year. Following his exit from mayoral office, the Raleigh Rotary Club and the First Presbyterian Church (of which he was a parishioner) awarded him with plaques commemorating his service to the city of Raleigh. Both organizations specifically praised his handling of local racial issues.

In 2010 the Wake County Public School Board voted to terminate a long-standing busing policy meant to increase schools' racial diversity. The decision generated criticism from the National Association for the Advancement of Colored People (NAACP) and from historian Timothy Tyson, who emphasized that desegregation had been achieved with much difficulty in Raleigh and cited Enloe's statement on the participants in the Greensboro sit-ins as evidence. In response, members of the school board suggested that they would consider renaming Enloe High School after an African-American. Board Chairman Ron Margiotta stated Enloe was a segregationist. The editorial board of The News & Observer, Raleigh's daily newspaper, called the label "entirely unfair," reasoning that "[t]he mayor declined to get out too far ahead of his white constituents as attitudes and practices evolved, but he did his part to facilitate change." The editors also stated that Enloe "was just the sort of moderate leader who helped the city navigate those treacherous times, when the push for integrated public facilities came to shove." Historian Jim Leloudis characterized Enloe as a "moderate" who, though having to be pressured to implement integration, abstained from using strict measures to control civil rights protesters. Margiotta subsequently asked another member of the school board, John Todesco, to research Enloe's stances on civil rights. Meanwhile, several Enloe High School students and alumni who disapproved of the board proposal created a Facebook group that opposed a name change, garnering the support of over 800 people. NAACP members stated that they were not seeking such an action, and NAACP leader William Barber II maintained that Tyson's remarks were only meant to contextualize the history of segregation in Wake County schools. In the face of growing criticism, Todesco stated that the board would not remove Enloe's name from the school unless something "horrid" about him was uncovered.
