= Travis H. Tomlinson =

American politician

Travis Hocutt Tomlinson

Mayor of Raleigh, North Carolina
- In office July 1, 1965 – June 30, 1969
- Preceded by: James W. Reid
- Succeeded by: Seby B. Jones

Personal details
- Born: September 17, 1913
- Died: May 11, 2012 (aged 98)
- Spouse: Margaret
- Children: 2

Travis Hocutt "Tommy" Tomlinson (September 17, 1913 – May 11, 2012) was mayor of Raleigh, North Carolina from 1965 to 1969.

Tomlinson was married to Margaret Waddell Tomlinson and had two sons, Travis H. Tomlinson Jr and William Parker Tomlinson.

In 1961 he was elected to serve on the Raleigh City Council. He was sworn in on July 3.

Prior to serving as mayor, Tomlinson founded Mayview Convalescent Home in Raleigh in 1957.
