= Elizabeth Reid Murray =

Elizabeth Davis Reid Murray
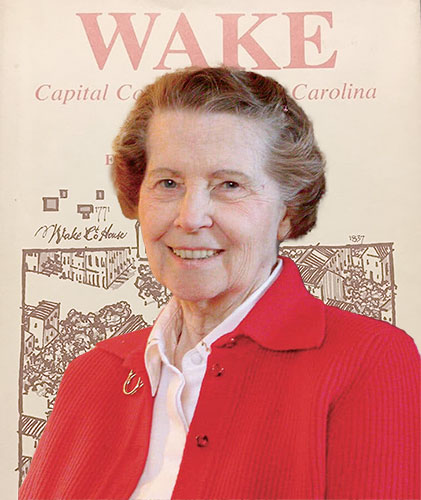

Member of the Raleigh City Council
- In office 1973–1974

Personal details
- Born: June 10, 1925 Wadesboro, North Carolina, US
- Died: March 13, 2014 (aged 88) Raleigh, North Carolina, US
- Spouse(s): James W. Reid, Dr. Raymond L. Murray
- Children: Michael Ernest Reid; Nancy Kennedy Reid Baker
- Education: Meredith College
- Occupation: Historian, Preservationist

Elizabeth Reid Murray (June 10, 1925 – March 13, 2014) was an American historian and preservationist known for her extensive documentation of Wake County, North Carolina's history.

== Early life and education ==
Elizabeth Reid Murray, born Mary Elizabeth Davis in Wadesboro, North Carolina, was the daughter of Dr. James M. Davis and Mary Kennedy Little Davis. She graduated from Meredith College in Raleigh in 1946.

== Career ==
Murray held various roles throughout her career, including:

- Continuity writer for Radio Station WPTF in Raleigh.
- Program manager for WADE Radio in Wadesboro.
- Director of the Meredith College News Bureau.
- Editor of the women's section at the Raleigh News and Observer.
- Executive secretary of the Governor's Coordinating Committee on Aging for North Carolina.
- Research assistant to Dr. Clarence Poe.
- Teacher of local history courses for Wake County Public Schools and Wake Technical College.
- Local history correspondent for The Raleigh Times, News and Observer, Raleigh Spectator, and Raleigh Magazine.
- Member of the Raleigh City Council in 1973.

== Contributions to history and preservation ==
=== Wake: Capital County of North Carolina, Volumes I and II ===
The Wake County Historical Society asked Elizabeth Reid Murray to write a history of Wake County to be ready for the 1971 county bicentennial. She did extensive research, and it soon became evident it would not be possible to meet the 1971 deadline. The Society and she dissolved the partnership. Mrs. Murray continued her research on her own, and 12 years later in 1983, published her first volume of Wake County history entitled, “Wake: Capital County of North Carolina.”. The second volume, spanning reconstruction through 1920 was published in 2008.

These works are considered foundational texts on Wake County's history and provide a comprehensive history of Wake County from its earliest days to the modern era.

- Volume I: Prehistory Through Centennial explores the county's formation, early settlement, and development through the 19th century, covering topics such as indigenous history, colonial settlement, agriculture, and the impact of the Civil War.
- Volume II: Reconstruction to 1920 continues the narrative, detailing Wake County's growth and transformation during the 20th century, including its urbanization, educational advancements, economic changes, and cultural evolution.

Together, the books serve as definitive resources on Wake County's historical, social, and cultural development.

=== The Elizabeth Reid Murray Collection at the Olivia Raney Local History Library ===
In 2006, she donated an extensive collection of manuscripts, slides, postcards, and photographs to the Olivia Raney Local History Library, forming a comprehensive resource for researchers. The full collection consists of over 600 boxes. The collection contains Murray's personal notes—often on small strips of paper—photocopies of source materials, newspaper clippings, and related research supporting her books on Wake County. The material has been broken down into two main archives:

==== Architecture, Historic Preservation, and Housing Developments, 1781-2007 ====
The Architecture archive spans 1781–2007, with a focus on materials from the 1870s–1990s. It highlights Murray's meticulous documentation and her commitment to preserving the architectural and historical legacy of Wake County. It is organized into three series:

- Architecture (1788–2003): Includes information on general architectural topics, architects, builders, plans, reports, studies, and architectural publications. It also covers structures in Wake County, both generally and individually.
- Historic Preservation (1792–2006): Focuses on historic preservation efforts, related publications, organizations, and historic tours, particularly those in and around Wake County.
- Housing Developments and Neighborhoods (1792–2007): Contains information on housing and developments in Wake County, including developers, realtors, and specific neighborhoods and housing projects.

==== Agriculture and Environment ====
This archive encompasses topics such as agricultural practices, legislation, and industries in North Carolina, including farming, livestock, tobacco, cotton, dairy, cooperative marketing, gardening, recycling, watersheds, and bodies of water, reflecting the region's agricultural and environmental history. The documents span from 1800 to 2004, with the majority of the materials dating from the 1860s to the 1990s. These documents provide valuable insights into the agricultural practices and environmental history of Wake County, supporting Murray's broader efforts to chronicle the county's historical development.

== Volunteering and community engagement ==
Elizabeth Reid Murray was deeply involved in numerous volunteer efforts throughout her life, contributing to the preservation of history, education, and the arts. Her extensive volunteer work included service with the following organizations:

- Historic Preservation and Museums: Tryon Palace Commission, Raleigh Historic Sites Commission, Mordecai Historic Park, Raleigh Mayor's Committee to Preserve Historic Objects, NC Executive Mansion, Raleigh City Museum Advisory Committee, and Yates Mill Associates.
- Education and Libraries: Meredith College (board of associates, board of trustees, Heritage Society, Carlyle Campbell Library, and Archives Advisory Committee), North Carolinians for Better Libraries, Wake Public Libraries Trustees, and NC Humanities Foundation Executive Committee.
- Arts and Community Service: Raleigh Arts Council, NC Museum of Art Docents, Raleigh Junior Woman's Club, and Wake Memorial Hospital Auxiliary.
- Church and Community Leadership: Pullen Memorial Baptist Church, Springmoor Retirement Community (Archives Committee, Constitution and Bylaws Committee, and library).
- Historic and Cultural Organizations: Estey Hall Foundation Advisory Committee and The North Caroliniana Society.

== Awards and recognition ==
- Elizabeth Reid Murray was inducted into the Raleigh Hall of Fame in 2017 - One of the top honors any citizen of Wake County can achieve.
- President's Cup, Wake County Historical Society (1994)
- Meredith College Distinguished Alumna award (1970) - She was the first alumni to receive the honor
- W.P. Peace Award for best book on NC history (1983)
- Anthemion Award, Capital Area Preservation, Inc. (1994)
- Elizabeth Reid Murray Fund - A fund that promotes the arrangement and description of private manuscripts through contract archivists.

== Selected works ==
- Wake: Capital County of North Carolina, Volume I: Prehistory Through Centennial
- Wake: Capital County of North Carolina, Volume II
- From Raleigh’s Past
