= Tom Fetzer =

American politician and mayor

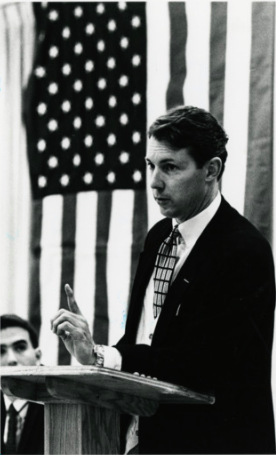

Chair of the North Carolina Republican Party
- In office June 13, 2009 – January 15, 2011
- Preceded by: Linda Daves
- Succeeded by: Robin Hayes

32nd Mayor of Raleigh
- In office December 1993 – December 1999
- Preceded by: Avery C. Upchurch
- Succeeded by: Paul Coble

Personal details
- Born: 1954 or 1955 (age 70–71)
- Political party: Republican
- Spouse: Kate Spina (m. 2009)
- Education: Wake Forest University (BA)

Thomas Harrison Fetzer Jr. (born 1954/1955) is an American politician and lobbyist who served three two-year terms as Mayor of Raleigh, North Carolina from 1993 to 1999. He was chairman of the North Carolina Republican Party from 2009 to 2011.

== Early life ==
Tom Fetzer attended Jesse O. Sanderson High School in Raleigh, North Carolina. In 1972, while still a student, he delivered an enthusiastic speech in support of United States Senate candidate Jesse Helms. Though eligible to vote in the 1976 presidential election, Fetzer did not vote in any election until 1980. He later attended and graduated from Wake Forest University with a Bachelor of Arts in politics. In the 1980s he worked as a political operative for the National Congressional Club, a political action committee chaired by Helms. He served as its assistant director in 1983.

Fetzer served as an assistant secretary in the Department of Transportation during the administration of Governor James G. Martin, as well as an aide to Senator John Porter East (both Republicans). After entering the private sector, Fetzer worked as a marketing executive.

In 1988 Fetzer, as a Republican, challenged Democratic incumbent David Price for the United States House of Representatives seat representing North Carolina's 4th congressional district. Fetzer attempted to link his campaign with George H. W. Bush's presidential candidacy, calling for reducing the national budget deficit without tax increases and strong measures to combat the trade of illegal drugs. He lost the November election by a large margin.

== Mayor of Raleigh ==
Fetzer ran for office to become Mayor of Raleigh in 1993. He won the November runoff election by a margin of 965 votes (51% of the total votes to Barlow Hergert's 49%). His victory was a surprise to observers; Raleigh had not had a Republican mayor within the populace's living memory. (Note: According to The News & Observer, Fetzer was the first Republican to hold the office since Joseph W. Holden, who served from 1874 to 1875.) Fezter's success was largely due to the energetic efforts of Wake County Republican Chairman Tom Roberg to mobilize voters. He also benefited from a fiscally conservative shift in the city's politics, which was sparked by the Wake County Taxpayers Association's successful effort to defeat a bond referendum in 1992.

As mayor, Fetzer favored tax cuts pushed to curb what he deemed unnecessary public spending. He said that public art was a waste of taxpayer funds and opposed the construction of a new convention center in downtown Raleigh.

In February 1994 Fetzer announced the creation of the Entrepreneurial Commission for Quality, Service and Efficiency (ECQSE). Tasked with drafting reforms to restructure the municipal administration to improve its functions, Fetzer stated that he hoped it would allow Raleigh to privatize some of its services in a manner similar to actions undertaken by the government of Charlotte. The ECQSE was almost entirely composed of local corporate leaders, which Fetzer maintained was necessary because the private sector promoted entrepreneurship. He wanted the commission to deliver its finals proposals within three months so he could incorporate the changes into the city's budget in June. In the part due to the deadline and to internal disorganization, the ECQSE's suggestions were vague and haphazard, and the city council accused it of being more concerned with cutting costs than increasing efficiency. Ultimately a 7.3% property tax reduction was implemented in June, which, though smaller than originally intended, was the city's first tax cut in three decades. Fetzer claimed the ECQSE's efforts as partially successful, reasoning that their proposals forced municipal officials to reconsider how they used the budget.

In September 1996 Hurricane Fran struck North Carolina and caused significant flooding in north Raleigh. Fetzer responded by allocating funds to improve water drainage infrastructure in the area.

Fetzer garnered 60% of the vote in his 1995 reelection and 56% of the vote in his bid for a third term in October 1997. Following the latter victory, he declared that he would not seek election to a fourth term. His personal charisma, organizational skills, and emphasis on crime control and lower taxes helped to solidify the Republican Party's presence in Raleigh, and in part facilitated the election of Republican Paul Coble to succeed him.

== Later career and political activity ==
After leaving mayoral office, Fetzer was a fellow at Harvard Kennedy School's Institute of Politics at Harvard University for the Spring 2000 academic semester and director of the Center for Local Innovation at the John Locke Foundation. He worked for the United States Tennis Association in New York City before returning to Raleigh several years later. He founded a North Carolina consulting firm with Mark Stephens, Fetzer/Stephens. He took unpaid leave from his consulting position to serve as U.S. Senator Elizabeth Dole's executive director at the National Republican Senatorial Committee. In late 2008 Fetzer and Stephens closed their consulting firm.

In 2009, Fetzer ran for chairman of the North Carolina Republican Party. He was elected chairman on June 13 on the second ballot at the party convention. Under his leadership the Republican Party took control of both houses of the state legislature in 2010, the first time this had occurred in over 100 years. Fetzer chose to leave the post of chairman five months before his term expired, and was replaced by Robin Hayes on January 15, 2011. Fetzer became chairman for Newt Gingrich's presidential campaign in North Carolina in December 2011.

In January 2011, Fetzer started a lobbying and media strategy firm, Fetzer Strategic Partners. In 2019 Michael V. Lee announced that he would join Fetzer's firm, which would be renamed Fetzer Lee.

=== University of North Carolina Board of Governors ===
In March 2017, Fetzer was elected to the University of North Carolina Board of Governors by the Republican-controlled North Carolina Senate. In July 2018 Fetzer became suspicious of a claim made by a candidate applying to become chancellor of Western Carolina University. He asked a private screening firm to investigate the veracity of the claim, and shared its findings with other members of the board. His actions aroused controversy—in part because Fetzer had himself been a candidate for the chancellorship—and some of his colleagues criticized him for acting on his own initiative and disclosing the name of a candidate to an external entity. He resigned from the board of governors on May 20, 2020.

== Personal life ==
On October 17, 2009, Fetzer married Kate Spina. In April 2011 he announced that he had been diagnosed with Non-Hodgkin lymphoma, but that doctors had given him a positive prognosis.

== See also ==
- List of mayors of Raleigh, North Carolina

== Citations ==
Political offices
Preceded by Avery C. Upchurch	Mayor of Raleigh; 1993–1999	Succeeded by Paul Coble
Party political offices
Preceded by Linda Daves	Chair of the North Carolina Republican Party; 2009–2011	Succeeded by Robin Hayes
