= Guilford Courthouse flag =

Militia banner used in the American Revolutionary War

Guilford Courthouse flag

The Guilford Courthouse flag is the name given to a North Carolina militia banner that was claimed to have flown at the Battle of Guilford Courthouse (March 15, 1781, Greensboro, North Carolina). However, analysis by the National Park Service showed that it was made of cotton and, therefore, was made at some later date.

The flag is recognizable by the reverse colors normally seen on American flags: red and blue stripes in the field with eight-pointed blue stars on an elongated white canton. The unique colors and dimensions are sometimes described as showing a lack of uniformity in a young nation at war, with poor infrastructure and bad communication. However, it was common practice during the Revolution for military units to carry flags that featured common American symbols (such as stripes and stars), but to make them uniquely identifiable for use as a company or regimental flag. As such, this flag was probably never intended for use as a national flag.

The original flag has been preserved since 1914 in the collection of the North Carolina Museum of History in Raleigh, North Carolina. It measures 42 inches (110 cm) high and 100 inches (250 cm) on the fly. The canton is 35 inches (89 cm) high and 73 inches (190 cm) long. The stars are 8 inches (20 cm) in diameter and have eight points. It is considered the oldest surviving example of an American flag with eight-pointed stars.

== History ==
The flag was presented to the Grand Masonic Lodge of North Carolina in 1909 by Colonel Micajah Bullock's son, Edward, who was 81 years old. Although there is no historical documentation of the flag being used in the battle and studies of the flag suggest that it may have had fifteen stars and fifteen stripes at one time, either originally made or perhaps added on when U.S. flags had fifteen stripes. Its cotton cloth as its primary fabric is evidence of post-1790 construction.

These factors cause some to question the validity of the Bullock story. However, Al Hoilman, curator of political and socio-economic history at the museum, has studied the reports on the controversy and believes the flag could have been flown at the battle. “It (story of the flag) smacks of truth to me,” he says. The Micajah Bullock chapter of North Carolina's DAR has collected extensive writings and records which lead to conclude based on the age of the fabric and no real evidence that any other stars were ever on the flag confirm the flag is real. While it may be an item of controversy, the family's documents record Micajah returning home weary from battle carrying the flag. Upon his passing, his son Edward was entrusted with its care. When copies of this design are sold or flown today, it is generally accepted as symbolic of the American Revolution and, specifically, the battle itself.
