= Madonna Acres Historic District =

Historic district in North Carolina, United States

- U.S. National Register of Historic Places
- U.S. Historic district
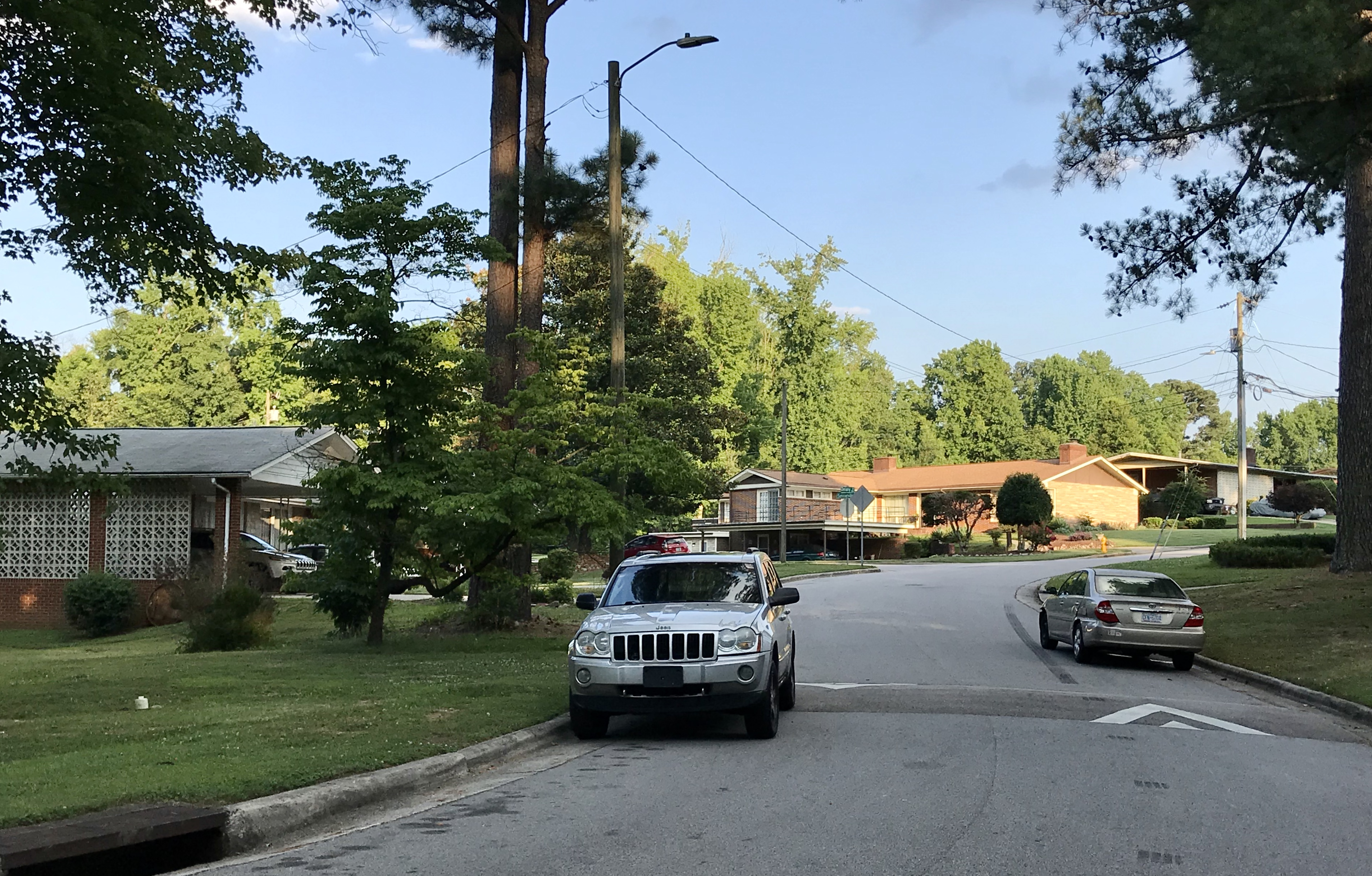

- Location within North Carolina Location within the United States
- Location: Delany Dr., Dillon, Summerville, and Tierney Circles, Raleigh, North Carolina
- Coordinates: 35°47′27″N 78°36′55″W
- Area: 13 acres (5.3 ha)
- Built: 1960-1965
- Built by: Richards, E. N. (Ed); John W. Winters
- Architect: Miller, Jerry
- Architectural style: Ranch, Split Level
- MPS: Post-World War II and Modern Architecture in Raleigh, North Carolina, 1945-1965
- NRHP reference No.: 10000632
- Added to NRHP: September 1, 2010

Madonna Acres Historic District is a historic post-World War II neighborhood and national historic district located 1 1/2 miles east of downtown Raleigh, North Carolina. The district encompasses 36 contributing buildings in Raleigh's first subdivision developed by an African American for African Americans. It includes a collection of Split-level and Ranch-style houses constructed of brick with accent walls of stone veneer or wood. A number of the houses feature carports.

It was listed on the National Register of Historic Places in 2010.
