= John W. Winters =

American politician (1920–2004)

Member of the Raleigh City Council
- In office July 3, 1961 – 1967

Member of the North Carolina Senate from the 14th district
- In office 1975 – July 1, 1977

Personal details
- Born: January 21, 1920 Raleigh, North Carolina, United States
- Died: February 15, 2004 (aged 84) Atlanta, Georgia
- Party: Democratic Party
- Spouse: Marie Montaque (m. 1941)

John Wesley Winters Sr. (January 21, 1920 – February 15, 2004) was an American real estate developer, politician, and civil rights activist. A member of the Democratic Party, he served on City Council of Raleigh, North Carolina, from 1961 until 1967 and in the North Carolina Senate for the 14th district from 1975 until 1977.

Winters was born in 1920 in Raleigh. He spent most of his youth there but moved to New York City to complete his education. He later returned to Raleigh and married, and soon thereafter dropped out of college to take up work after his first child was born. He then worked a series of service jobs before saving up enough money to start his own construction company. After building a few homes, Winters' company took up larger projects and began constructing hundreds of houses. In 1961 Winters competed for a seat on the Raleigh City Council and won, becoming the first black person elected to the body since 1900. He chaired the council's Public Works Committee, developing and implementing a plan which used state funds to pave neglected streets in black neighborhoods. He also served as an adviser to Governor Terry Sanford on matters of race and civil rights. Winters retired from the city council in 1967, but seven years later he was elected to the North Carolina Senate seat from the 14th district. He won reelection two years later, but resigned in July 1977 following his appointment to the North Carolina Utilities Commission.

== Early life ==
John Winters was born on January 21, 1920, in Raleigh, North Carolina, to Charles Winters and Lillie Summerville. He was the tenth of twelve children. He grew up in what he called a racially mixed neighborhood on land acquired by his grandfather near Raleigh's downtown. Winters attended elementary school in the city. His family suffered from financial difficulties throughout his youth, and after his mother died when he was thirteen years old he moved to New York City to live with his sister. He attended Frederick Douglass Junior High in Harlem and Boys High School in Brooklyn, graduating from the latter in 1939. He subsequently attended Long Island University, Virginia State College, and Shaw University on football scholarships. On February 3, 1941, he married Marie Montaque. The following year their first child was born, and Winters dropped out of school to take up work. The couple had a total of eight children. Winters was a devout Catholic and a parishioner at St. Mary's Roman Catholic Church in Raleigh.

== Business career ==
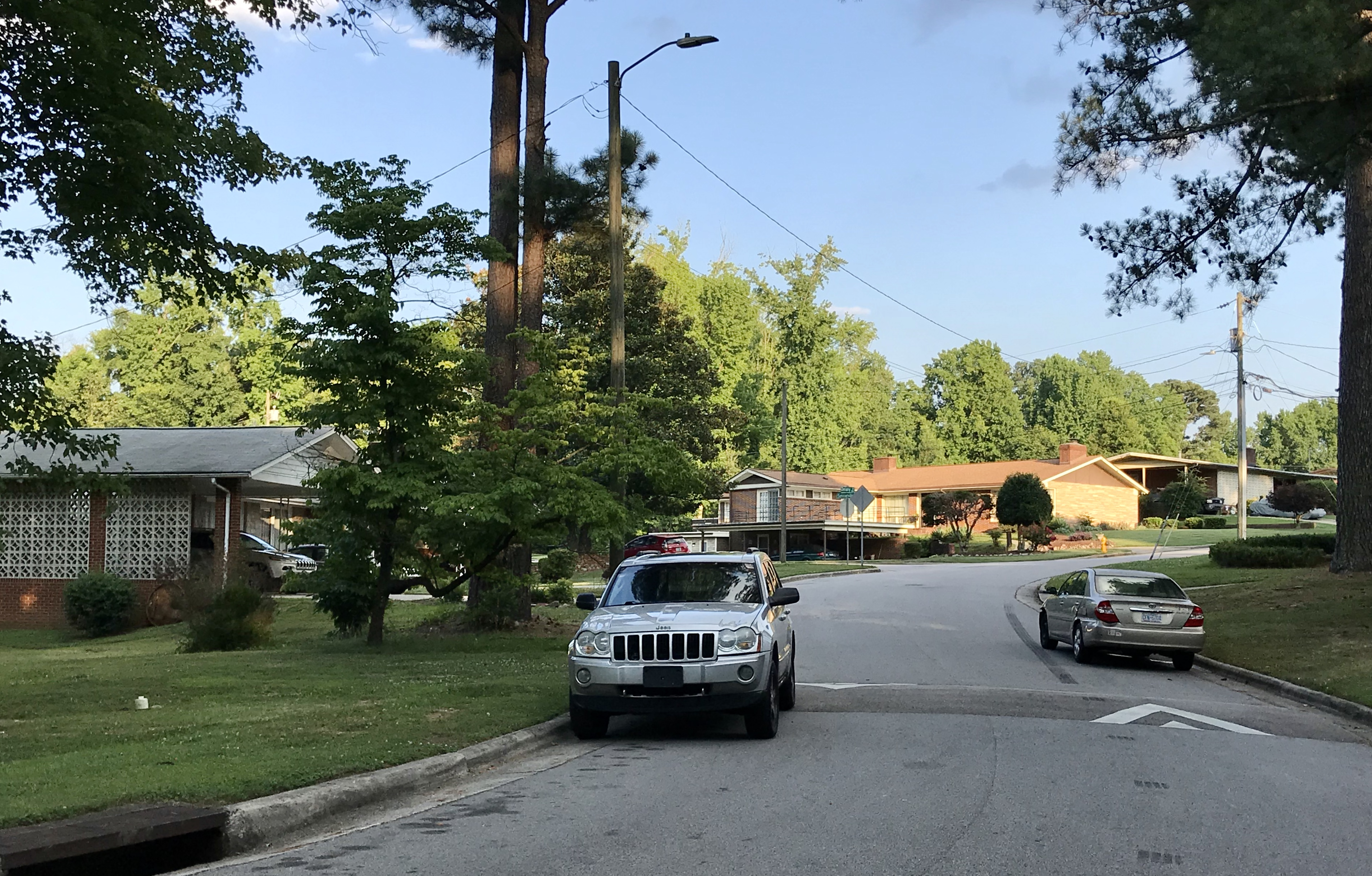
Winters oversaw the construction of the Madonna Acres subdivision (pictured).

Winters initially worked a variety of physically demanding jobs. During World War II he attempted to enlist in the United States Armed Forces, but was disqualified from service due to scars left by a childhood illness. He instead found work as a porter at the Raleigh railway station. After garnering enough savings, Winters purchased a nightclub and poultry farm. Due to financial difficulties, he lost both properties in 1948 and was forced to move his family into the attic of his father's home. He applied for work as a deliveryman for a dairy company in Raleigh, but, feeling that he would be denied a job because he was black, he returned to Brooklyn to wait tables at Lundy's Restaurant. Upon being informed that his application was successful, he moved back to Raleigh to take up the delivery job. By 1951 he had been promoted to supervisor and, making a higher salary, he purchased land along Hargett Street and designed and built his own house for his family. Since his dairy job kept him busy only until about noon each day, he found additional employment as a skycap at Raleigh–Durham Airport. While there, he protested against the airport's racially segregated facilities. With his new income, Winters was able to pay off his debts and set aside additional funds as savings.

In 1957 Winters founded a house construction business, John W. Winters and Company. With the help of lumber supplier Cliff Benson and banker John Hervey Wheeler, he was able to secure the financing and supplies to build three homes by the end of the year. He managed his enterprise during the day and worked night-shifts as a skycap. In 1958 Winters built seven houses. The following year he purchased a 12-acre plot of land from a black family and erected 41 homes. He named the development Madonna Acres. Over time his company's projects expanded; it oversaw the construction of hundreds of homes and several apartment buildings. In the 1980s it built Wintershaven, an affordable housing complex for the elderly, and erected a few small shopping centers in southeast Raleigh. Winters eventually became a millionaire while his company grew to be the largest black-owned real estate firm in North Carolina. He joined the Wake County Homebuilders Association and the National Association of Home Builders. For a time he served as director of the North Carolina Housing Corporation. He was a founding member of the Meadowbrook Country Club, a private organisation meant to serve as an alternative for Raleigh's black affluent men, who were excluded from white clubs. He built its clubhouse.

== Political career ==
Winters' father frequently discussed politics during his childhood. Winters distributed literature for W. Kerr Scott's successful North Carolina gubernatorial campaign in 1948 while delivering dairy (the company he worked for, Melville Daries, was owned by Scott's brother) and he campaigned for Terry Sanford's and John F. Kennedy's successful respective bids for the North Carolina governorship and United States presidency. He was a member of the Raleigh Citizens Association, an organization for black civic leaders. While chairing the organization's Voting and Registration Committee, he participated in efforts to increase registration of black voters. At the behest of black community leaders, Winters ran for an at-large seat on the Raleigh City Council in May 1961. Facing 13 other candidates, he placed sixth with 6,168 votes, thus securing one of the seven seats and becoming the first black person to serve on the council since 1900 when James Hamlin and Charles Williams served. He was sworn in on July 3.

Governor Sanford frequently sought his advice on race relations and civil rights issues. (Note: Academics Robert Korstad and James Leloudis wrote that of all of Sanford's advisers on race relations, "Winters had perhaps the most notable influence" and was "forthright" in delivering his opinions to the governor.) When a dispute arose over segregated movie theaters in North Carolina, Sanford sent him to Washington D.C. to discuss the matter with United States Attorney General Robert F. Kennedy. He was a member of the "Oval Table Gang", an informal group of community leaders that met in Ralph Campbell Sr.'s home to discuss strategies to desegregate Raleigh schools, plan demonstrations, and assist black candidates for public office. On January 18, 1963, the governor appointed Winters to the 24-man Good Neighbors Council, a committee tasked with promoting youth employment and desegregationist business practices. He pressured Sanford to call for S&W Cafeteria to integrate its restaurants. In the spring he helped mediate between black protesters and community activists and Raleigh Mayor William G. Enloe, who were in a dispute over segregated cinemas operated by the latter. In May he accompanied a group of student protesters to the Governor's Mansion to express their grievances about racial segregation. When civil rights leader Martin Luther King Jr. visited Raleigh in 1966, Winter was sent by the city to receive him at the airport. Winters chaired the council's Public Works Committee for four years, and developed and implemented a plan which used state funds to pave neglected streets in black neighborhoods. He served out three terms, leaving the city council in 1967 to give more attention to his business. In 1969 Jim Hunt placed him on a commission tasked with rewriting the rules of the state chapter of the Democratic Party. From 1964 until 1970 he served as vice chairman of the Wake County chapter of the party. He served as a delegate at the 1972 Democratic National Convention.

In 1972 Winters unsuccessfully ran for a seat in the North Carolina Senate. Two years later he ran as a Democrat for a Senate seat of the 14th district, representing portions of Wake, Lee and Harnett counties. He won the election with the support of local blacks and newly arrived white residents and thus, together with Frederick D. Alexander, became the first black elected to the body since the Reconstruction era. He took his seat the following year and served through 1976. Winters served as Chairman of the Committee on Alcoholic Beverage Control and was a member of the Committee on Appropriations, the Appropriations Committee on Education, the Committee on High Education, the Election Laws Committee, the Committee on Human Resources, the Committee on State Government, the Committee on Transportation, the University Board of Governors Committee, and the Ways and Means Committee. During his first term he sponsored two bills. He was subsequently elected to a second term and served until Jim Hunt—then serving as Governor of North Carolina—appointed him to the North Carolina Utilities Commission. He resigned from the Senate on July 1, 1977. Winters campaigned for the United States House of Representatives seat in North Carolina's 4th congressional district in 1984, but lost in the Democratic primary election. He later served on the University of North Carolina Board of Governors.

== Death ==
In his later life Winters suffered from advanced Parkinson's disease. He died on February 15, 2004, in a hospital in Atlanta. In 2007 he was inducted into the Raleigh Hall of Fame.
