= Micajah Bullock =

Colonial American military officer

Captain Micajah Bullock
- Born: October 20, 1745; Hanover County, Colony of Virginia, British Empire
- Died: circa 1828
- Military career
- Allegiance: (United States) United Colonies
- Branch: Continental Army
- Rank: Captain
- Conflicts: Battle of Moore's Creek Bridge; Battle of Guilford Courthouse
- Occupations: landowner, bondsman, surveyor, sheriff

Captain Micajah Bullock (October 20, 1745 – circa 1828) was an American revolutionary, military officer, and landowner.

== Biography ==
Bullock was born on October 20, 1745 in Hanover County, Virginia. He inherited land in Granville County, North Carolina from his father, Edward Bullock II, as a young man. He also received over 2,000 acres in land grants from the state of North Carolina. By 1776, he owned over 4,000 acres of land.

Bullock served in various capacities in local government, including as a county entry taker, sheriff, county surveyor, and bondsman.

Bullock served in Captain James Yancey's Company, in Colonel Richard Henderson's regiment, during the American Revolutionary War. During the war, he wrote a letter to Colonel Folsome about back payments of troops in 1776. He fought at the Battle of Moore's Creek Bridge, the first Revolutionary War battle in North Carolina, on February 26, 1776. Bullock also fought at the Battle of Guilford Courthouse and possibly carried the Guilford Courthouse flag. He served as a captain in the Granville County regiment.

After the war, in 1797, he filed a petition to build a grist mill on his property.

He was the father of Major Edward Bullock.

Bullock died between March 30, 1827 and May 1828.
