= Smedes York =

American mayor

33rd Mayor of Raleigh, North Carolina
- In office 1979–1983
- Preceded by: Isabella Cannon
- Succeeded by: Avery C. Upchurch

Personal details
- Born: George Smedes York; February 22, 1941 (age 84); Raleigh, North Carolina

George Smedes York (born February 22, 1941) is an American politician and real estate developer. He served as mayor of Raleigh, North Carolina from 1979 to 1983. After graduating from Needham Broughton High School he went on to attend North Carolina State University where he also played on the basketball team. He earned a degree in civil engineering there in 1963, and a Master of Business Administration degree from the University of North Carolina at Chapel Hill in 1968. He then worked for his family construction company, York Construction. He also sat on the Raleigh City Council from 1977 to 1979. He was inducted into the Raleigh Hall of Fame in 2007.

From 1989 until 1991 York served as chairman the Urban Land Institute.
