= Avery C. Upchurch =

Mayor of Raleigh, North Carolina

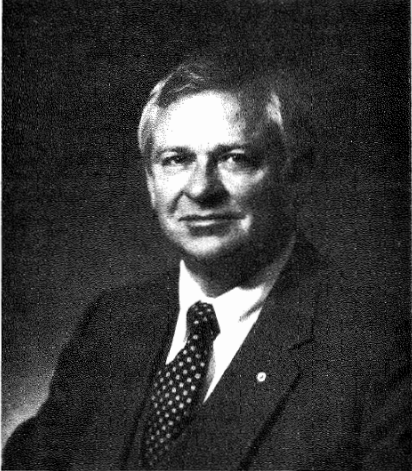

57th Mayor of Raleigh
- In office 1983–1993
- Preceded by: Smedes York
- Succeeded by: Tom Fetzer

Personal details
- Born: December 22, 1928 Rutherford County, North Carolina, U.S.
- Died: June 30, 1994 Raleigh, North Carolina, U.S.
- Occupation: Attorney, businessman, politician

Avery Council Upchurch (December 22, 1928 – June 30, 1994) was an American businessman and politician who served as the Mayor of Raleigh, North Carolina from 1983 to 1993. His ten-year tenure was the longest continuous mayoral service in Raleigh during the 20th century and coincided with a major period of urban and economic growth in the city.

== Early life and business career ==
Upchurch was born in Rutherford County, North Carolina, and moved to Raleigh as a teenager. After graduating from Broughton High School, he operated two filling stations in Raleigh and ran a heating oil business. He also served as executive director and president of the North Carolina Service Station Association and held leadership positions in other civic and trade organizations.

Upchurch began his political career in 1976 with an appointment to the Raleigh Planning Commission, later serving on the Raleigh City Council before running for mayor.

== Mayor of Raleigh ==
Upchurch was elected mayor in 1983, succeeding Smedes York. His administration emphasized expansion of Raleigh's infrastructure to support population and economic growth. Major initiatives included:

- Widening of streets and expansion of water and sewer systems
- Launch of curbside recycling programs
- Construction of additional downtown parking
- Construction of the Coastal Credit Union Music Park at Walnut Creek
- Renovation of Martin Marietta Center for the Performing Arts, formerly Raleigh Memorial Auditorium
- Planning for expansion of the Raleigh Convention Center
- Initial feasibility studies that lead to the Lenovo Center, formerly Raleigh Entertainment and Sports Arena

Upchurch was widely recognized for his down-to-earth and consensus-driven leadership, personally engaging with citizens and local issues. Anecdotally, he once personally collected garbage from a resident when city collection services failed.

== Later life and legacy ==
Upchurch declined to seek a sixth term in 1993. Within months of leaving office, he was diagnosed with esophageal cancer and passed away on June 30, 1994, at age 65. In recognition of his service, the Raleigh Municipal Building was renamed the Avery C. Upchurch Government Complex in his honor.

== Personal life ==
Upchurch was married to Margaret Upchurch and had at least one son, Edward Upchurch, as well as a stepson, Lane West. He remained active in his community throughout his life, participating in church and civic organizations.

== See also ==
- List of mayors of Raleigh, North Carolina
- Raleigh City Council

Political offices
Preceded by G. Smedes York	Mayor of Raleigh; January 1983–1993	Succeeded by Tom Fetzer
