= Thomas W. Bradshaw =

American politician (1938–2025)

Secretary of the North Carolina Department of Transportation
- In office 1977–1981
- Governor: Jim Hunt
- Preceded by: G. Perry Green, Sr.
- Succeeded by: William R. Roberson, Jr.

33rd Mayor of Raleigh, North Carolina
- In office 1971–1973
- Preceded by: Seby B. Jones
- Succeeded by: Clarence Lightner

Personal details
- Born: October 22, 1938
- Died: December 30, 2025 (aged 87)

Thomas Wood Bradshaw Jr. (October 22, 1938 – December 30, 2025) was an American businessman and politician in North Carolina. He was a member of the city council of Raleigh, and became the youngest mayor of Raleigh, serving for one term (1971–1973).

Bradshaw later served as North Carolina Secretary of Transportation during the first term of Governor Jim Hunt (1977–1981). After his time in state government, he worked as managing director and co-head of the Transportation Group for Citigroup Global Markets.

He was a candidate for a seat in the North Carolina Senate in 2014.

Bradshaw died on December 30, 2025, at the age of 87.

== See also ==
- List of mayors of Raleigh, North Carolina

== Sources ==
- Former Raleigh mayor goes to work for DOT
