= James W. Reid (mayor) =

American politician

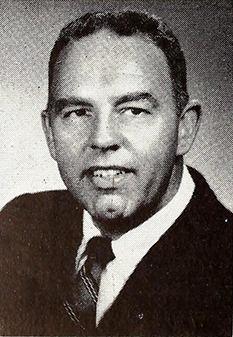
- Reid in 1957

27th Mayor of Raleigh, North Carolina
- In office July 1, 1963 – 1965
- Preceded by: William G. Enloe
- Succeeded by: Travis H. Tomlinson

Personal details
- Born: September 15, 1917; Asheville, North Carolina, United States
- Died: June 19, 1972 (aged 54); Raleigh, North Carolina, United States
- Political party: Democratic Party
- Children: 3

James William Reid (1917-1972) was an American politician who served as the Mayor of Raleigh, North Carolina.

== Early life ==
James Reid was born on September 15, 1917, in Asheville, North Carolina, to William Ernest Reid and Bessie Perkinson. During his early childhood, he lived across from Thomas Wolfe, who depicted Reid's family in his novel Look Homeward, Angel as the Tarkinton family. Reid attended the then Mars Hill Junior College (now Mars Hill University) and graduated from Wake Forest College (now Wake Forest University) in 1937 with a degree in physics.

== Commercial career ==
From 1938 to 1942, Reid worked as a staff announcer for radio stations in Asheville, Wilson, Greenville, South Carolina, and Raleigh. In 1942, Reid entered the Naval Air Force for World War II, where he served in the Aleutian Islands for two years and afterwards was a radar officer at Adak, Kodiak, Attu. He finished his service with the Bureau of Ships in Washington D.C. He returned to radio station WPTF in Raleigh as staff announcer, sports director, and weather reporter; in 1958 he became manager of the Raleigh office of WTVD television station. From October 1960 until his death he was senior vice-president of Branch Banking and Trust Company in Raleigh.

== Political career ==
Reid was sworn-in as the Mayor of Raleigh on July 1, 1963.

== Personal life ==
Reid married his wife, Mary Elizabeth Davis, on February 7, 1948, in Wadesboro, North Carolina. They had two sons, Michael E and James William Jr., and a daughter, Nancy K.

== Death ==
James Reid died on June 19, 1972, in Raleigh, North Carolina, from a heart attack at the age of 54.
