= Isabella Cannon =

American politician (1904–2002)

32nd Mayor of Raleigh, North Carolina
- In office December 1977 – October 1979
- Preceded by: Jyles Coggins
- Succeeded by: Smedes York

Personal details
- Born: May 12, 1904 Dunfermline, Scotland
- Died: February 13, 2002 (aged 97) Raleigh, North Carolina, U.S.
- Party: Democratic

Isabella McLean Bett Walton Cannon (May 12, 1904 – February 13, 2002) was an American politician who served as the first female mayor of Raleigh, North Carolina from 1977 until 1979. At the age of 73, she defeated the incumbent Mayor, Jyles Coggins, during the election of 1977. Known as "the little old lady in tennis shoes," she served one term as mayor of Raleigh until 1979. Isabella Cannon died at the age of 97 on February 13, 2002.

== Education and Employment ==
Cannon was born Isabella McLean Bett Walton (daughter of Helen Bett Seamans and James Walton) on May 12, 1904, in 15 Downieville Crescent, Dunfermline, Scotland, and came to the United States with her family in 1916. After graduating from Winecoff High School in North Carolina, she attended Elon College where she received a Bachelor of Arts in English and Science in 1924. While working as a teacher at Elon College high school, she married Claude M. Cannon in 1924, who was a registrar and business manager at Elon College. In addition to working as a high school teacher, she encountered a variety of work experience, including her position as the mayor of Raleigh. She served as the director of the Elon College weekday experimental school of religious education from 1925 to 1928, worked as a cashier at the Elon Banking and Trust Company from 1928 to 1930, and later became an assistant registrar and manager of the college bookstore at Elon in 1932. Ten years later, she became a bookkeeper and payroll manager at WRAL Radio Station in Raleigh and worked until 1943. She then held a position as a supervisor with the French Supply Council in Washington D.C. from 1944 to 1945. For the next two years, she was an interviewer for overseas financial clearance for returning and terminating personnel in the United Nations Relief and Rehabilitation Administration. From 1947 to 1954, she traveled overseas to Liberia, West Africa, and Iraq with her husband, Claude Cannon, who was serving in diplomatic service. After returning to the United States, he died in 1954 in Raleigh. Soon after, she became the director of the library at North Carolina State University and maintained her job for the next fifteen years.

== Mayor of Raleigh ==
Isabella Cannon was elected as the first female mayor of Raleigh in 1977. On November 13, 1977, The New York Times reported, "Rather than the simple, senior-citizen Cinderella story of a 73-year-old political novice who upset a vigorous, veteran incumbent, the victory of Isabella Cannon as Mayor-elect is considered here as the latest skirmish in a continuing power struggle over the economic future of this capital city of 150,000". Her victory over the previous mayor, Jyles Coggins, was surprising news for many people, not only because of her age, but also because of his widespread support from the city residents. Based on her motto of "planned growth," however, she was able to win the election by 14,508 to 13,315. She was sworn-in in December and served one term until 1979. She was defeated for re-election by city councilman Smedes York.

== Honors ==
In 1978, Isabella Cannon was awarded an honorary doctor of laws degree from Elon University. In the same year, Mrs. Cannon was nominated for Woman of the Year by Ladies' Home Journal. From 1980-1981, she was nationally recognized as the Woman of the Year by the senior citizens organization, September Days Clubs. In 1983 she received Elon University's Distinguished Alumni Award and was the first woman to receive the Elon medallion in 1991. In 1999, Cannon was awarded the Order of the Long Leaf Pine by Governor Jim Hunt in recognition of her service to North Carolina. Her most recent honor was at the university's 2009 Founder's Day celebration where she became the first woman to be honored at the event.

In 2011 Gardner Street Neighborhood Park was renamed in her honor.

== Activities and organizations ==
Aside from her time as the mayor of Raleigh, she was an active member of the community. She served as President for the University Park Homeowners Association, Inc. (1981) and the North Carolina Senior Citizens Association, Inc. (1982). She also served a Vice Presidency for the North Carolina Senior Citizens Association from 1979–1981, as well as holding such a title for the Women in Business Advisory Council, Inc. (1979) and was the first Vice President of Precinct #1- Raleigh. Isabella Cannon was on the Board of Directors for the North Carolina State University Humanities Foundation, Inc. (1981), the Committee on Constitutional Integrity, Inc. (1982), the North Carolina State Youth Council (1981), and the Executive Board of Directors in 1981. She was also an active committee member of several other organizations such as the Wake County Chapter of the United Nations in 1980, where she was appointed to the Mayor's committee for the United Nations.

Among the many organizations that Isabella Cannon participated in, she was a member of the League of Women's Voters, Mordecai Square Historical Society, Raleigh N.O.W., and the Wake Society for Prevention of Cruelty to Animals to name a few. Cannon also served as a charter member of the Wake County Democratic Women, an Associate member of both the Wake County Democratic Men and the Wake County Young Democrats, and was on the Executive Committee of the Elon College Alumni Association.

Political offices
Preceded by Jyles Coggins	Mayor of Raleigh; 1977– 1979	Succeeded by Smedes York
