= Raleigh Times =

- Type: Daily newspaper
- Founded: 1879
- Ceased publication: December 30, 1989
- Language: English
- City: Raleigh, North Carolina
- Country: United States
- Sister newspapers: The News & Observer (1955-1989)

The Raleigh Times was the afternoon newspaper in Raleigh, North Carolina. The history of the paper dates back to the Evening Visitor, first published in 1879. The Visitor later bought out other rival afternoon papers, the Daily Press in 1895 and the Evening Times in 1897. In the midst of and after the acquisitions, the paper was variously known as the Press-Visitor and the Times-Visitor before eventually settling on the Raleigh Times by 1901 following purchase by John C. Drewry, who later moved the fledgling paper to its longtime home at 14 East Hargett Street in downtown Raleigh.

After the paper initially went bankrupt and suspended publication in 1910, it was sold to John A. Park who had reportedly made the purchase by depleting the city's gold supply. Under Park's leadership, the revamped Raleigh Times resumed production in 1912 and became the main rival of the much larger News & Observer. Unlike other newspaper editors, Park abstained from editorials and instead entertained readers with stories of his world travels.

Famous alumni include U.S. Senator Jesse Helms who was city editor for two brief stints; Arthur Ochs Sulzberger Jr. who was a reporter and later publisher of the New York Times; Nell Battle Lewis, the longtime N&O columnist who briefly served as associate editor; and Bette Elliott, whose work as the women's editor led to her long-running role as host of WRAL-TV's Femme Fare.

Eventually, the N&O purchased the Times in 1955 but continued to publish the paper until the national decline of afternoon newspapers led the Times to cease production. The final edition of the Raleigh Times was published on November 30, 1989. The former downtown headquarters of The Times has been converted into a bar and restaurant that utilizes a theme inspired by the defunct paper.
