= Raleigh City Council =

Governing bodyof Raleigh, North Carolina, US

Type
- Type: Unicameral

Structure
- Seats: 8
- Political groups: Nonpartisan (de jure) (8)

Elections
- Last election: November 5, 2024
- Next election: 2026

The Raleigh City Council is the legislative governing body of Raleigh, the capital city of North Carolina. Operating under a council–manager form of government, the council enacts city ordinances, approves the city budget, and provides oversight of city administration.

It consists of eight members, including the mayor, with five elected from individual districts and three elected at-large. Elections are held in even-numbered years.

== History ==
The earliest municipal government in Raleigh dates to January 1795, when the North Carolina General Assembly appointed seven commissioners to oversee city functions such as street repair, policing, and tax collection. These commissioners elected an "Intendant of Police," a role analogous to the modern mayor, who served until the first popular mayoral election in 1803. Governance relied heavily on local elites to manage city affairs.

Before the mid-20th century, Raleigh was governed under a traditional mayor-commission structure, with a board of commissioners or aldermen sharing legislative and executive authority with the mayor. This system relied on local political networks and did not always provide professional administration.

=== Reconstruction Era ===
During and after the Reconstruction era, Raleigh’s municipal government reflected the sweeping political changes taking place across the South. Federal Reconstruction policies in the late 1860s opened local offices to African Americans for the first time. Among the most prominent was James Henry Harris, a formerly enslaved teacher and civic leader who served as one of Raleigh’s first Black aldermen. Harris also represented Wake County at the 1868 state constitutional convention and championed public education and equal rights in municipal affairs. His participation marked a brief period of biracial city governance before Democrats regained control in the late 1870s.

As Reconstruction ended, Raleigh’s “Board of Aldermen” again became dominated by white businessmen and property owners, and African Americans were gradually excluded from office through new voting restrictions and political intimidation. Nevertheless, Black educators and activists such as Charles N. Hunter continued to influence city affairs indirectly, advocating for improved schools and civic opportunities. By the late 19th century, the city’s aldermanic government oversaw growing responsibilities for water, sanitation, and street systems—functions that anticipated the modernization of Raleigh’s government in the decades to come.

=== 20th Century Council Reform ===
The most significant restructuring of Raleigh's municipal governance occurred on March 18, 1947, when voters formally adopted the Council–manager government system. This change was not unique to Raleigh, but was part of a broader, nationwide embrace of Progressive Era principles, aimed at reducing political patronage and modernizing governance by achieving greater efficiency and professionalism.

The primary drive for this reform was the need for a governmental structure capable of managing the city's rapid expansion following World War II. The older Mayor-Alderman/Commissioner system was deemed inadequate to handle the complex, technical, and administrative demands of a rapidly growing metropolis; a period during which Raleigh's population doubled and its physical limits nearly tripled. Reformers, often favoring a business-like approach, championed the council-manager model to explicitly separate politics from administration. This marked the final move away from the older commission or aldermanic style of local government.

Under the new structure, the elected City Council (including the mayor) serves as the purely legislative and policy-making body. Its members were elected for two-year terms. The most critical change was the establishment of the professional, appointed City Manager, who serves as the chief administrative officer. The Manager oversees day-to-day operations, manages city staff, and executes the Council's policies, allowing elected officials to focus on strategic policy decisions and community goals.

=== Modern Governance and Recent Reforms ===
The Council's role expanded significantly to meet the demands of Raleigh's sustained growth. The Council has since overseen major urban development initiatives, including comprehensive zoning reforms, downtown revitalization projects, and the major expansion of city services and infrastructure. In recent years, the Council has focused on modernizing its own structure and elections. In 2021, municipal elections—including council elections—were moved from odd-numbered years to even-numbered years, aligning with state and national election cycles.

Further changes were enacted in May 2024 to the municipal election process. The Council voted to transition the Mayor and all Council members from the historical two-year terms to four-year staggered terms, effective with the 2026 municipal election. This change, intended to improve governmental stability and focus on long-term policy, will see approximately half of the members run every two years. Concurrently, the Council approved the implementation of a non-partisan primary election format, requiring a March primary where the top two candidates for each district advance to the November general election.

== Council Powers and Responsibilities ==
The Raleigh City Council enacts ordinances and resolutions, adopts policies, approves the city budget, and oversees the city manager, who administers daily operations.

Council members appoint individuals to boards, commissions, and committees, shaping advisory and regulatory functions. The council holds regular public and work sessions, including public comment periods that allow residents to speak on issues.

The council also approves citywide strategic plans to guide development, service delivery, and policy priorities. It oversees public participation frameworks to ensure transparency in governance.

== Current Members 2024–2026 term ==
This is a list of current council members. For former members, see List of former members of the Raleigh City Council.

- Janet Cowell, Mayor
- Stormie Forte, at-large
- Jonathan Melton, at-large
- Mitchell Silver, District A
- Megan Patton, District B
- Corey Branch, District C
- Jane Harrison, District D, Mayor Pro Tempore
- Christina Jones, District E

== Notable former members ==
- Ralph Campbell (1985–1991) – First African American elected to Raleigh City Council, later became North Carolina State Auditor; notable for advancing civil rights and diversity in local government.
- Janet Cowell (2001–2004) – Later elected North Carolina State Treasurer; served on council during a period of fiscal modernization and city planning initiatives.
- Jesse Helms (1957–1961) – Later became a U.S. Senator known for his conservative politics; council tenure notable as early political foundation in Raleigh public service.
- Neal Hunt (2001–2004) – Served on council before election to North Carolina General Assembly; known for policy work on education and municipal finance.
- Saige Martin (2019–2020) – artist
- Elizabeth Reid Murray (1973–1974) – historian and preservationist
- Eric Miller Reeves (1993–1996) – Notable for work on local urban development and civic initiatives during his tenure; later involved in state-level policy work.

== See also ==
- Raleigh, North Carolina
- List of former members of the Raleigh City Council
- List of mayors of Raleigh, North Carolina
- Wake County, North Carolina
