= Mayor of Raleigh, North Carolina =

Head of government of Raleigh, North Carolina

- Seal of Raleigh, North Carolina

- Flag of Raleigh, North Carolina

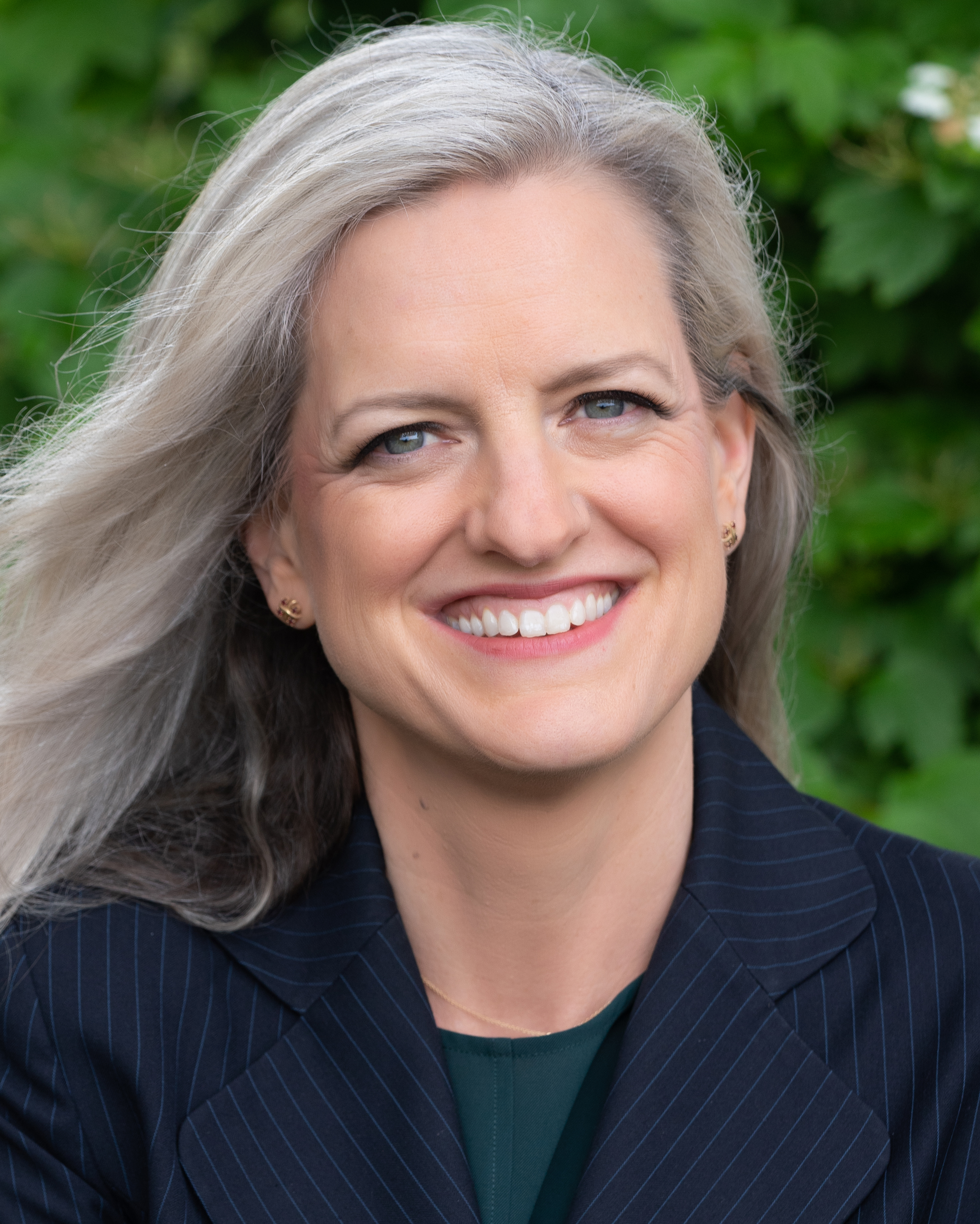
- Incumbent; Janet Cowell since December 2, 2024
- Member of: Raleigh City Council
- Seat: Raleigh Municipal Building, Raleigh, North Carolina
- Term length: Two years
- Constituting instrument: Act for the Regulation of the City of Raleigh
- Precursor: Intendant of Police of Raleigh, North Carolina
- Formation: March 2, 1795
- First holder: John Haywood

The mayor of Raleigh is the mayor of Raleigh, the state capital of North Carolina, in the United States. Raleigh operates with council-manager government, under which the mayor is elected separately from Raleigh City Council, of which they are the eighth member.

== History and development ==
In 1795, the North Carolina General Assembly established the office of Intendant of Police of Raleigh, North Carolina. The first person to hold the office of intendant of police was John Haywood. Officeholders were elected by the Raleigh Board of Commissioners, who were themselves appointed by the General Assembly. Starting in 1803, intendants of police were elected annually by all freemen (including free African-Americans) owning land within the city limits. The name Mayor was not adopted until 1856.

The current mayor is Democrat Janet Cowell, former state treasurer, who was first elected in 2024. The longest-serving mayors in Raleigh's history are Avery C. Upchurch, who was in office for ten years between 1983 and 1993, and Charles Meeker, who served from 2001 through 2011. Four mayors have served for eight years.

Elections are held every two years. A nonpartisan blanket primary is held in October. If no candidate receives more than 50% of the vote, the two candidates that received the most votes progress to the general election run-off election in November. In 2009, for the first time, the election was nonpartisan, in that the candidates did not have formal party affiliation denoted on the ballot. Incumbent Charles Meeker won 62% in the first round, making a run-off election unnecessary.
