= List of people from Raleigh, North Carolina =

This is a list of people who were born in, lived in, or are closely associated with Raleigh, North Carolina.

== Academia ==
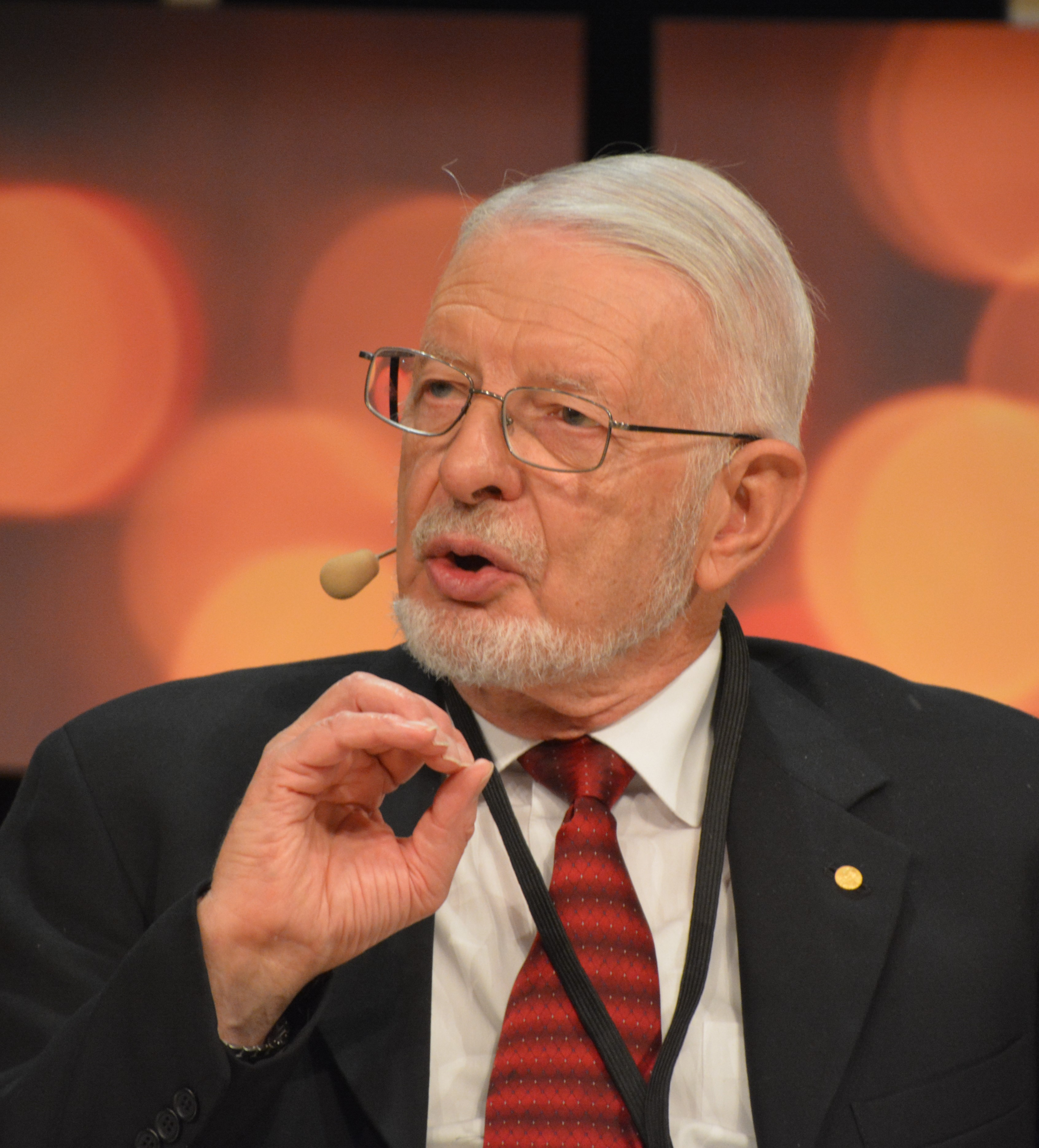
Daniel McFadden

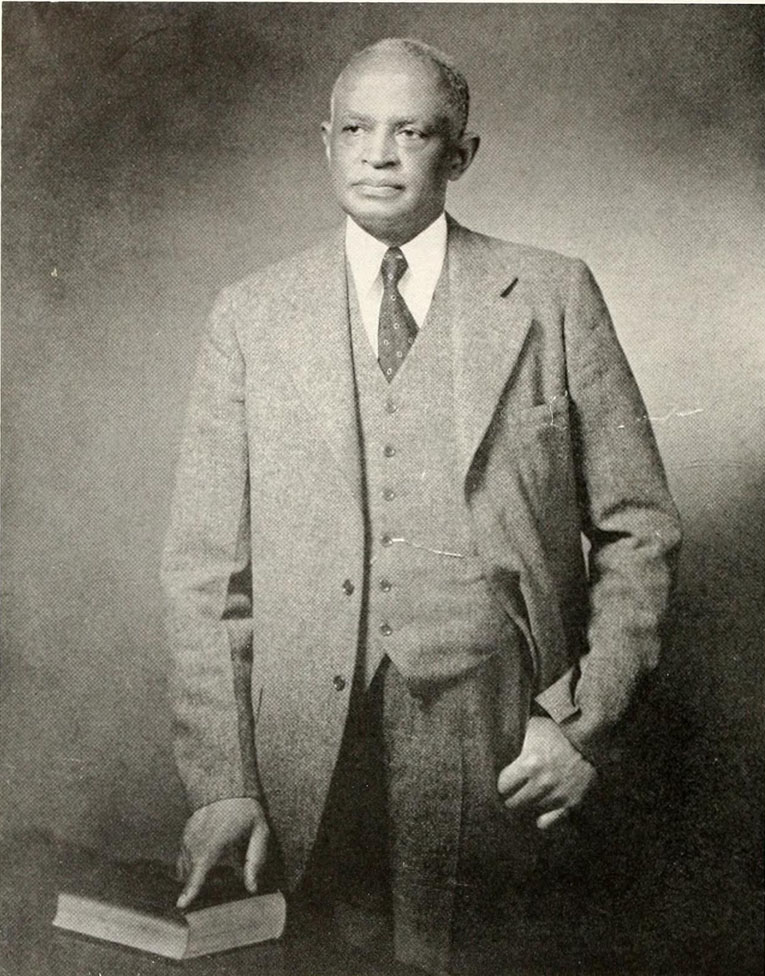
James E. Shepard

- Carrie Lougee Broughton (1879–1957), librarian and first female State Librarian
- John Chavis (1763–1838), African-American educator and theologian; early integrationist (Raleigh's Chavis Park is named for him)
- Anna J. Cooper (1858–1964), author, educator and scholar; fourth African-American woman to earn doctoral degree (in 1924)
- Walter Dobrogosz (1933–2023), microbiologist
- Phillip Griffiths, mathematician, known for his work in the field of geometry
- John E. Ivey, Jr., educator and founder of Southern Regional Education Board; co-creator of Peace Corps
- Daniel McFadden, economist
- Michael Munger, economist, Duke University political science professor
- Mary Jane Patterson, first African-American woman to receive a Bachelor of Arts degree
- Evelyn Pope (1908–1995), Dean of Library Sciences at North Carolina Central University
- Tom Regan, philosopher and animal-rights advocate
- Vermont C. Royster (1914–1996), managing editor of Wall Street Journal, Pulitzer Prize winner, recipient of Presidential Medal of Freedom
- James E. Shepard, pharmacist, civil servant and educator; founder of what would become North Carolina Central University
- Blake R. Van Leer, university president, dean of NC State University, inventor and civil rights advocate
- James W. York, mathematical physicist; recipient of Dannie Heineman Prize for Mathematical Physics from American Physical Society

== Arts ==
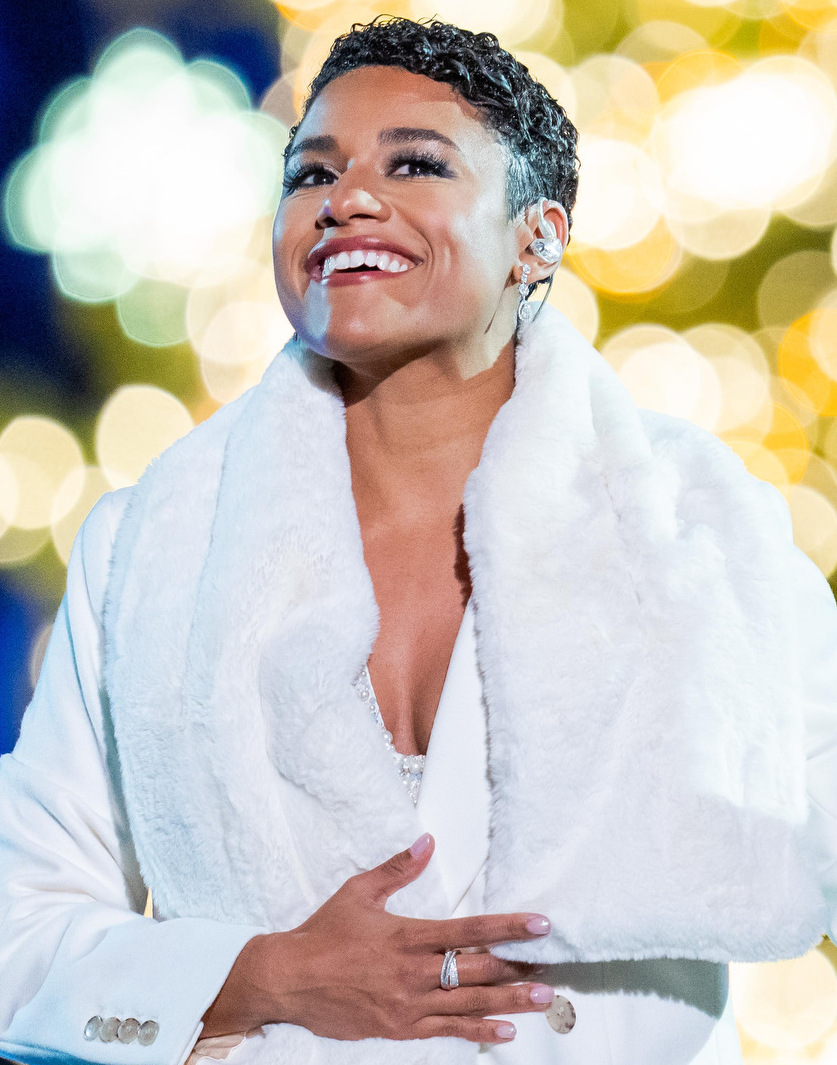
Ariana DeBose

- Juliana Royster Busbee (died 1962) and Jaques Busbee (died 1947), artists and founders of Jugtown Pottery
- Ariana DeBose, actor and dancer
- Paul Friedrich, visual artist and cartoonist
- Isabelle Bowen Henderson (1899–1969), painter and floriculturist
- Herb Jackson, painter
- Renaldo Kuhler, scientific illustrator for the North Carolina Museum of Natural Sciences
- Rachel Nabors, gURL.com graphic designer
- Martha Nichols, choreographer and dance instructor
- Hunter Schafer, model and actress
- Mel Tomlinson, ballet and modern dancer
- Michael C. Hall, actor and musician
- Lea Ved, dancer and choreographer

== Athletes ==
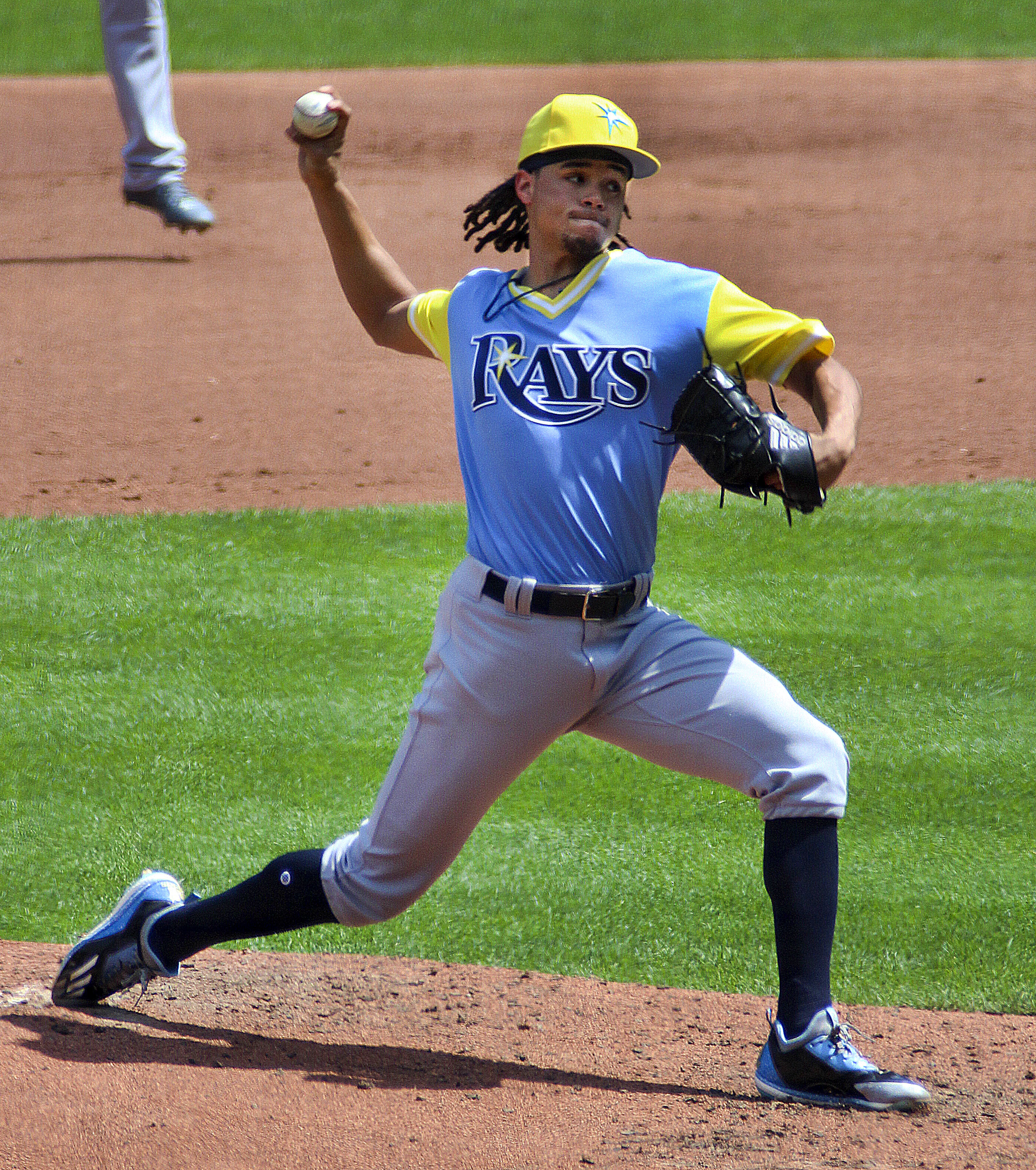
Chris Archer

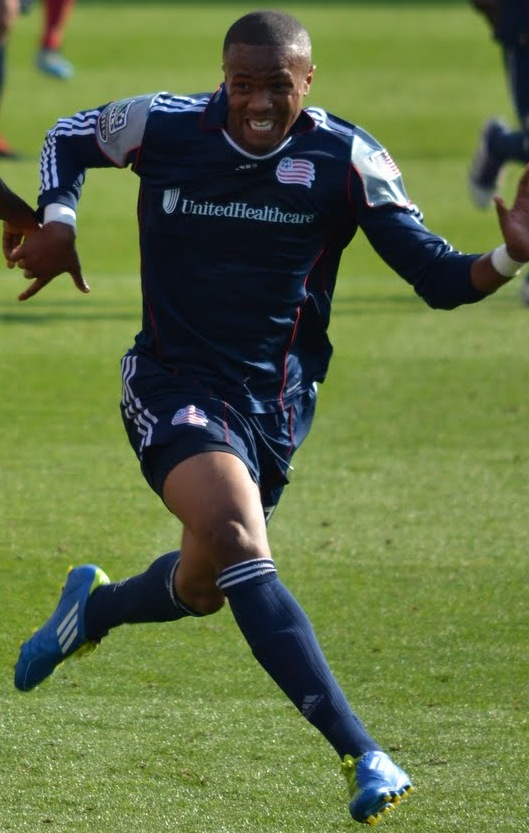
Darrius Barnes

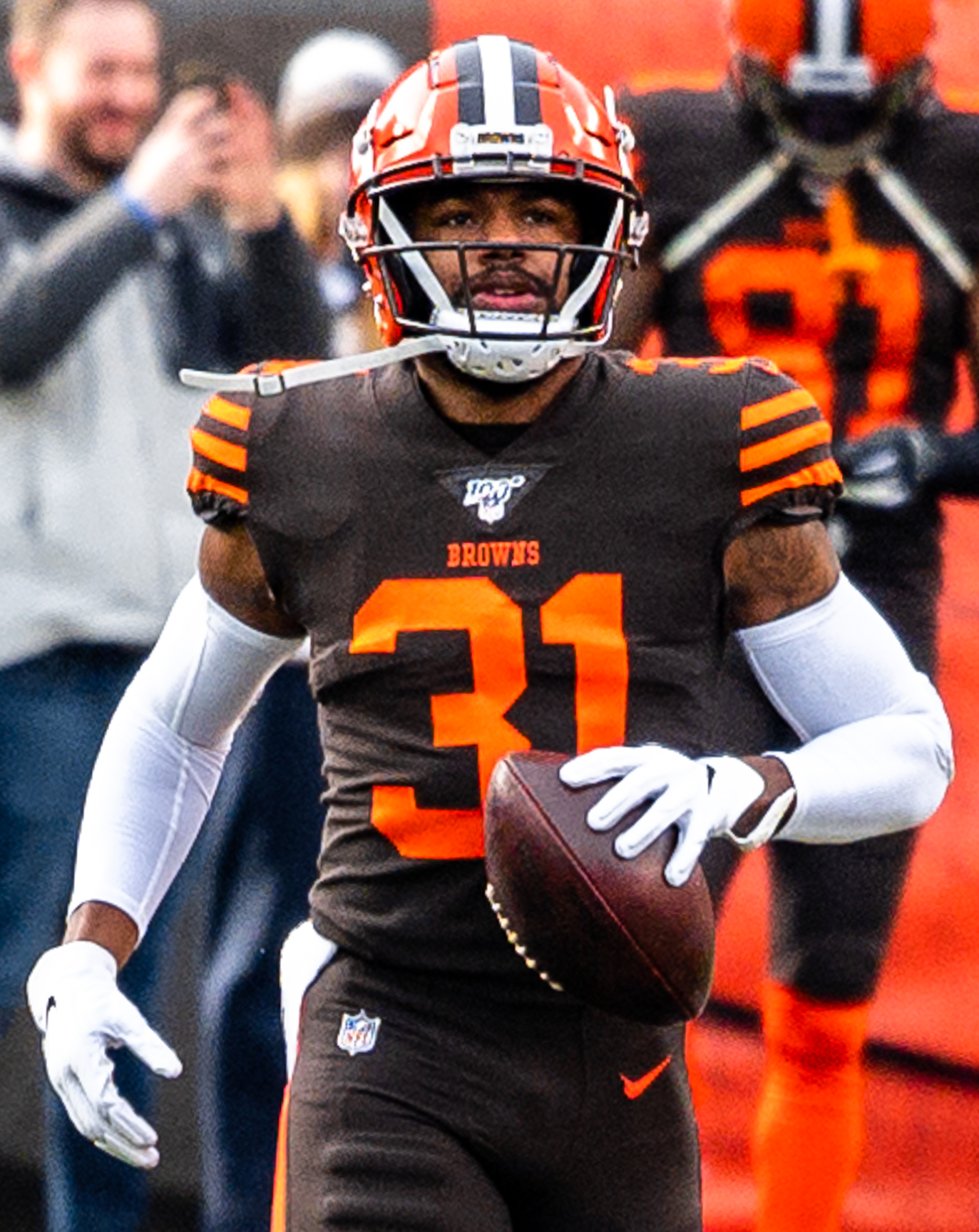
Juston Burris

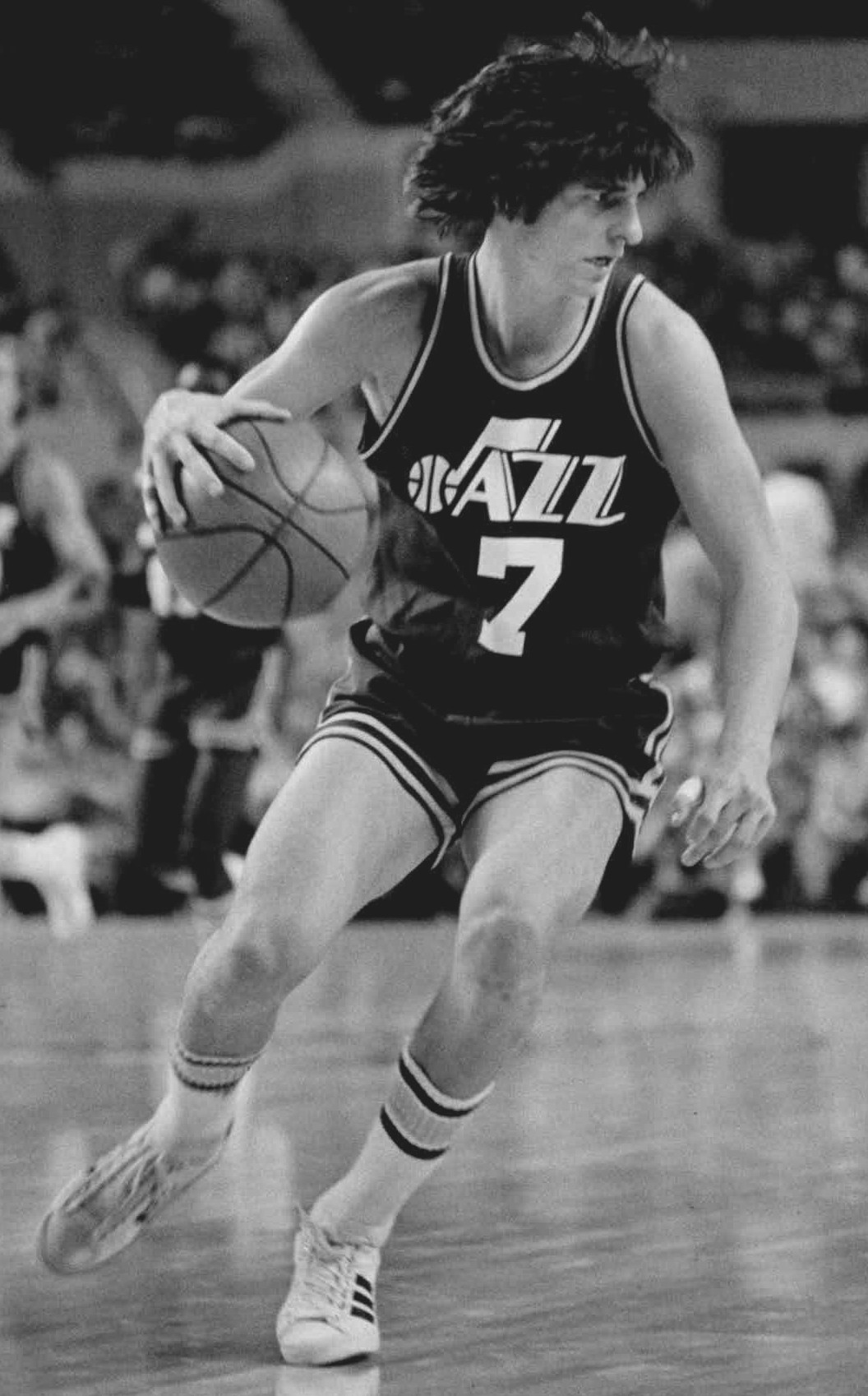
Pete Maravich

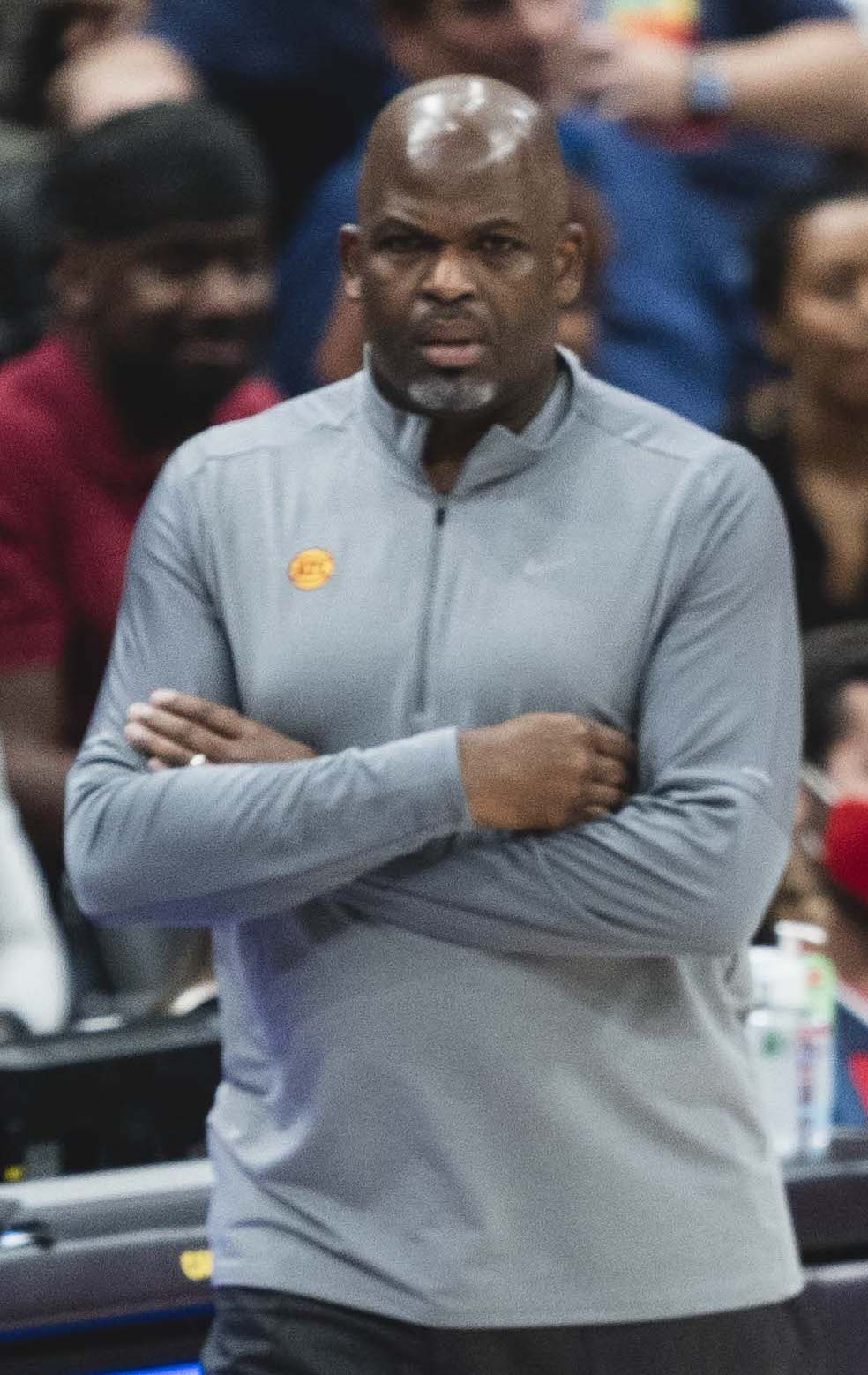
Nate McMillan

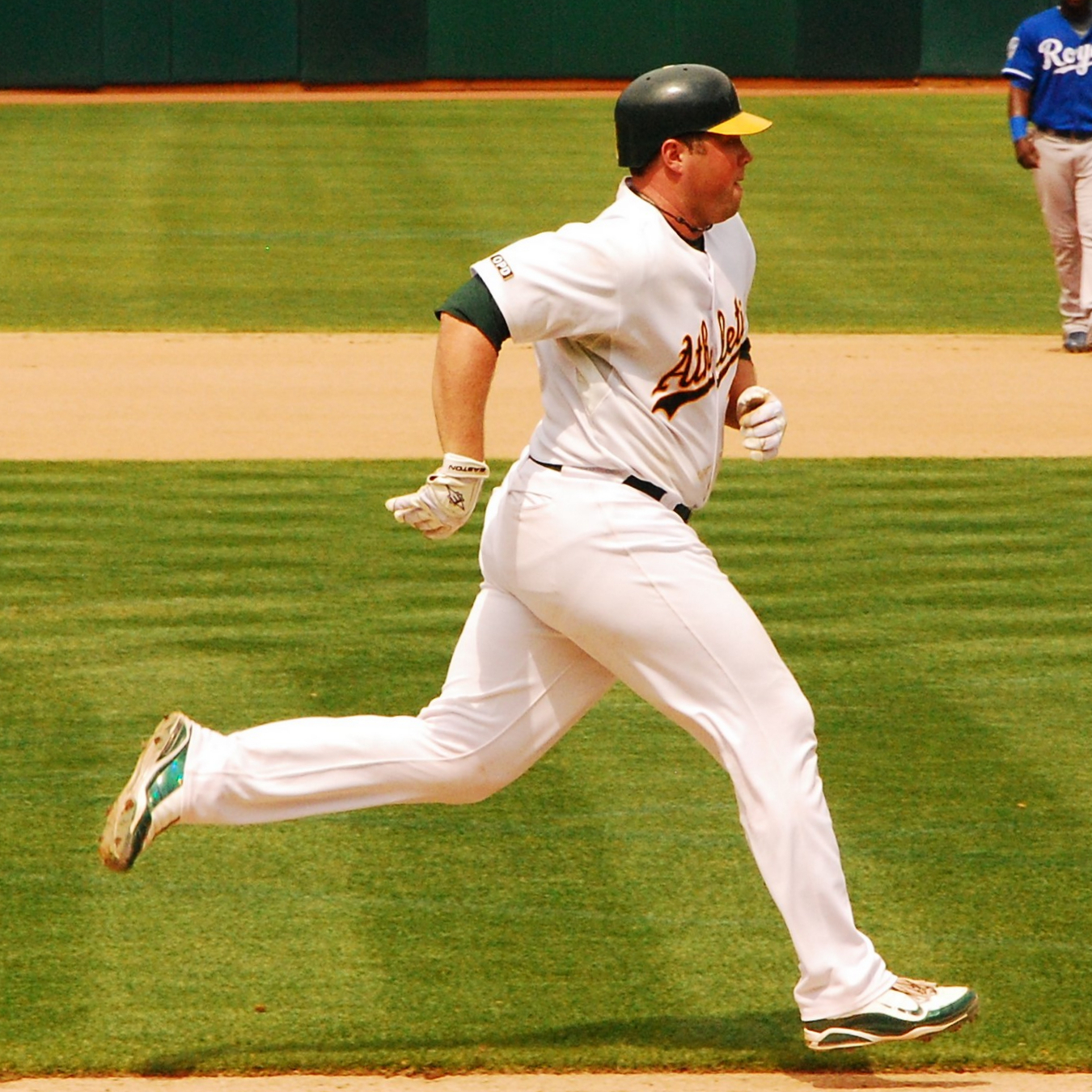
Landon Powell

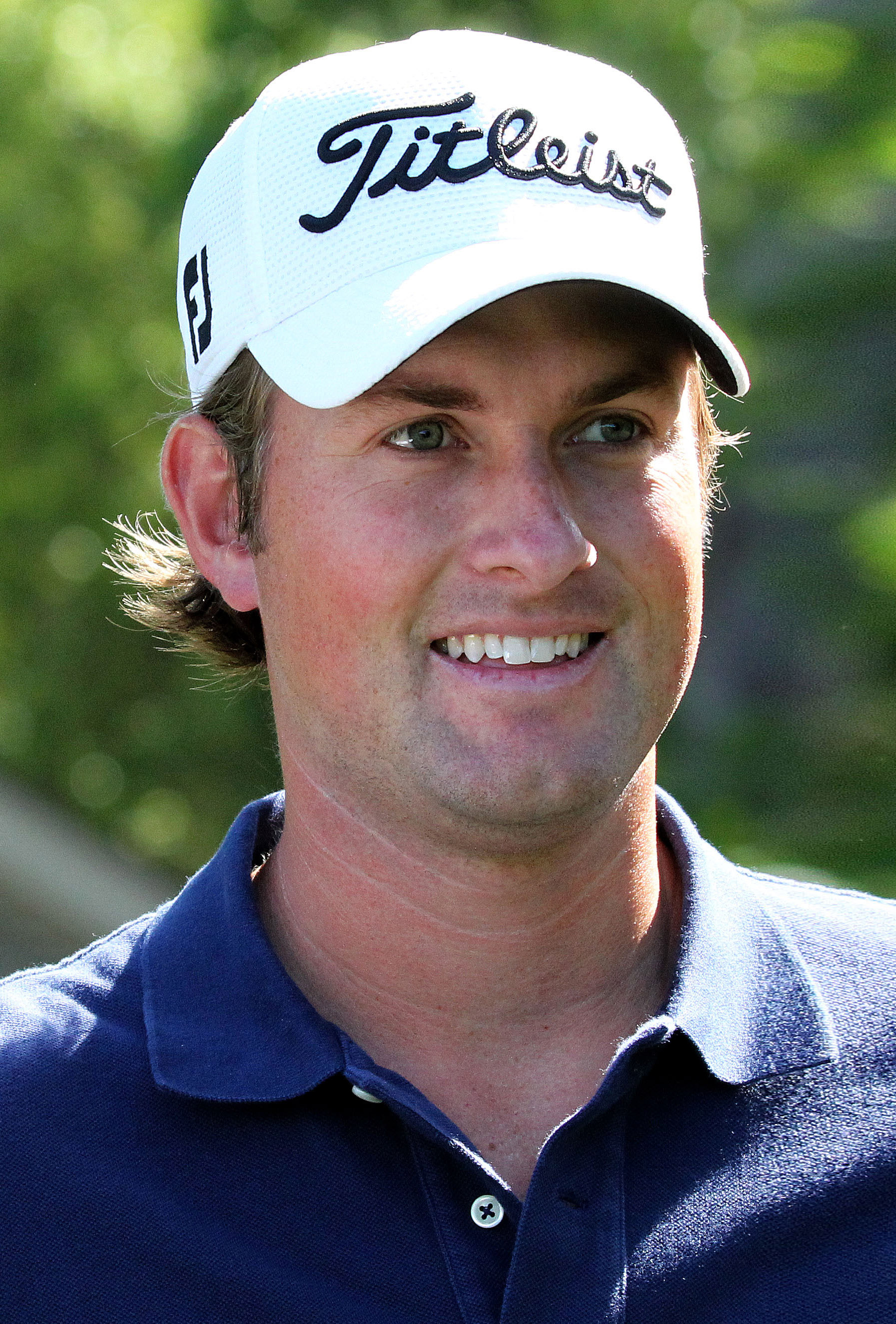
Webb Simpson

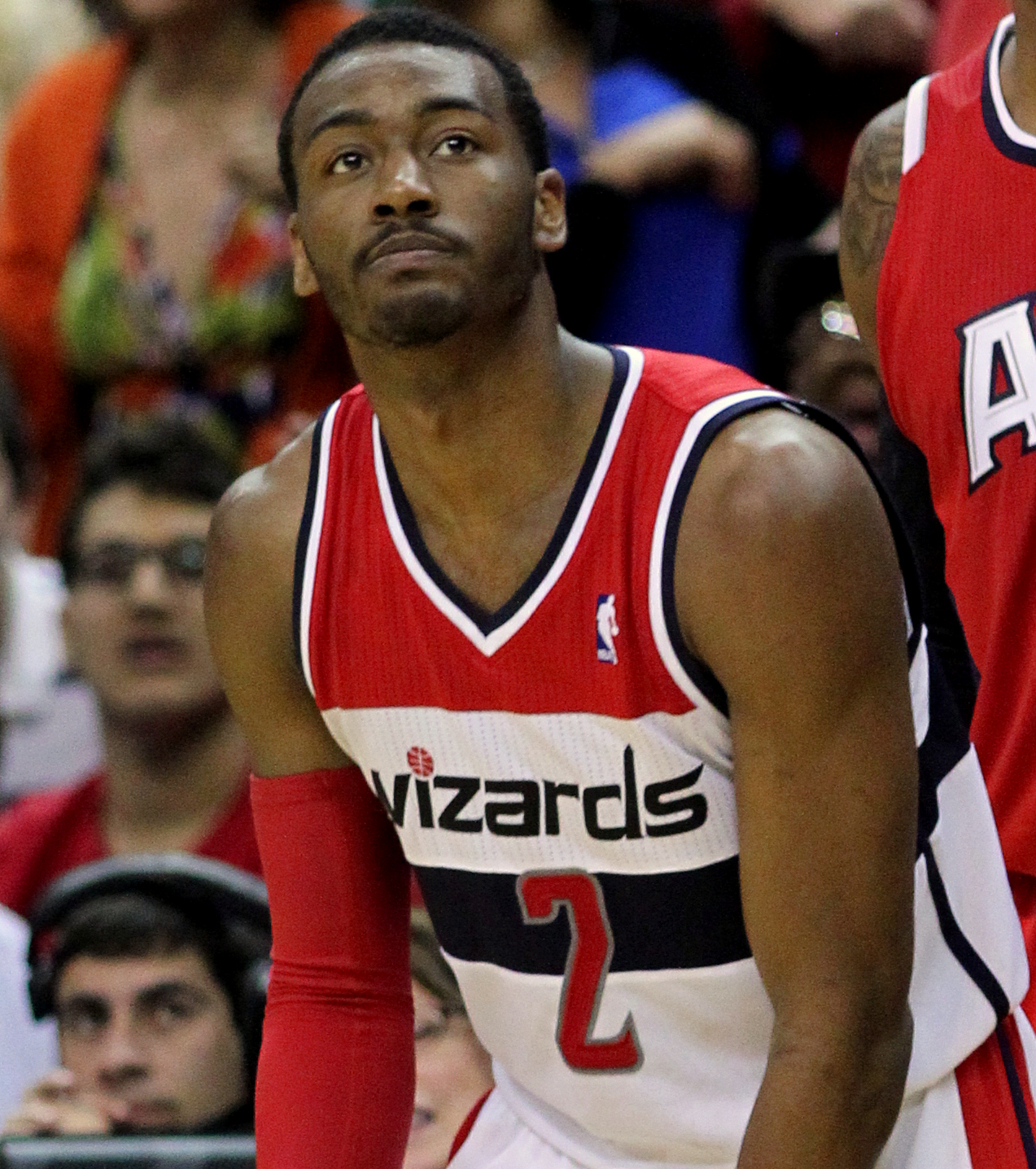
John Wall

- Nazmi Albadawi, soccer player
- Loy Allen Jr., NASCAR Cup Series driver
- Chris Archer, MLB pitcher for Pittsburgh Pirates
- Hannah Aspden, youngest swimmer on Team USA to medal at either the Olympics or Paralympics in 2016
- John Baker Jr. (1935–2007), National Football League athlete and longtime Wake County sheriff
- Scott Bankhead, MLB player and pitcher for Team USA in the 1984 Olympic Games
- Darrius Barnes, soccer player
- Bates Battaglia, NHL player, played for Carolina Hurricanes 1997–2003
- Braxton Berrios, NFL wide receiver
- Rod Brind'Amour, NHL player, former Carolina Hurricanes player and current head coach
- Clark Brisson, soccer player
- Bucky Brooks, former NFL athlete
- Evan Brown, soccer player
- Willie Burden, professional Canadian football player with Calgary Stampeders of Canadian Football League
- Juston Burris, NFL safety
- Everett Case (1900–1966), NC State University men's basketball coach, member of N.C. Sports Hall of Fame and College Basketball Hall of Fame
- Isadora Cerullo, Olympic rugby player for Brazil; graduated from Enloe High School
- Bill Cowher, former professional American football coach and player
- Ike Delock, Major League Baseball player
- Randy Denton, NBA player
- James L. Dickey III (born 1996), basketball player for Hapoel Haifa of the Israeli Basketball Premier League
- Donald Evans, former NFL defensive end
- David Fox, Olympic gold medalist in swimming
- Ron Francis, NHL player (Carolina Hurricanes) 1998–2004, member of Hockey Hall of Fame
- Jeff Galloway, Olympic long-distance runner and author
- Justin Gatlin, Olympic sprinter
- Michael Gracz, professional poker player
- T. J. Graham, NFL wide receiver with New York Jets
- Brian Gutekunst, general manager of the Green Bay Packers
- Chesson Hadley, professional golfer
- Josh Hamilton, Major League Baseball player
- Hardy Boyz, Matt Hardy and Jeff Hardy, professional wrestlers
- Antwan Harris, NFL player for New England Patriots' Super Bowl team
- Leroy Harris, NFL player for Tennessee Titans
- Bret Hedican, NHL player, played for Carolina Hurricanes 2001–2008
- Gregory Helms, professional wrestler with WWE
- Anne Henning, Olympic speed skater, 1972 gold and bronze medalist
- Ryan Jeffers, MLB player
- Curt Johnson, professional soccer player
- Marion Jones, disgraced Olympic track athlete
- Craig Keith, NFL player
- Chad Larose, NHL player, played for Carolina Hurricanes 2005–2013
- Roy Lassiter, professional soccer player for D.C. United and United States men's national soccer team
- Pete Maravich (1947–1988), Hall of Fame basketball player; attended high school in Raleigh
- Bruce Matthews, former NFL player for Tennessee Titans; 14-time Pro Bowl participant, Pro Football Hall of Fame inductee
- Daniel McCullers, NFL defensive lineman
- Nate McMillan, NBA player and head coach of Atlanta Hawks
- Richard Medlin, NFL player
- Ben Youssef Meite, sprinter, 3-time African champion in 100m
- Jackie Moreland (1938–1971), pro basketball player
- Kevin "PPMD" Nanney, professional Super Smash Bros. player
- Chuck Nevitt, NBA player
- Caleb Norkus, professional soccer player
- Bob Perryman, NFL player for New England Patriots and Denver Broncos
- Brandon Phillips, second baseman for Atlanta Braves, Cincinnati Reds
- Landon Powell, MLB player (Oakland Athletics)
- Shavlik Randolph, former professional basketball player
- Greg Raymer, professional poker player
- Shawan Robinson, professional basketball player with Newcastle Eagles in the British Basketball League
- Randolph Ross, track athlete, 2020 Olympic gold medalist in the 4x400m relay
- Anthony Rush, NFL player for the Atlanta Falcons
- Paul Shuey, MLB pitcher
- Webb Simpson, PGA Tour golfer
- Isaiah Todd, NBA G-League player
- Leigh Torrence, NFL player with Washington Redskins
- P. J. Tucker (born 1985), NBA player for the New York Knicks and 2008 Israeli Basketball Premier League MVP
- Duane Underwood Jr., professional baseball pitcher for the Pittsburgh Pirates
- Jim Valvano (1946–1993), NC State University men's basketball coach, 1983 NCAA champion, TV commentator
- John Wall, NBA player who last played for the Los Angeles Clippers
- Pat Watkins, MLB outfielder
- Carson Wentz, quarterback for NFL's Indianapolis Colts
- Chris Wilcox, NBA athlete
- Jesse Williams, American high jumper and 2011 World Champion
- Kristi Yamaguchi, Olympic figure skater, married to Bret Hedican
- Danny Young, NBA player
- Kay Yow (1942–2009), NC State University women's basketball coach, member of Women's Basketball Hall of Fame

== Business ==
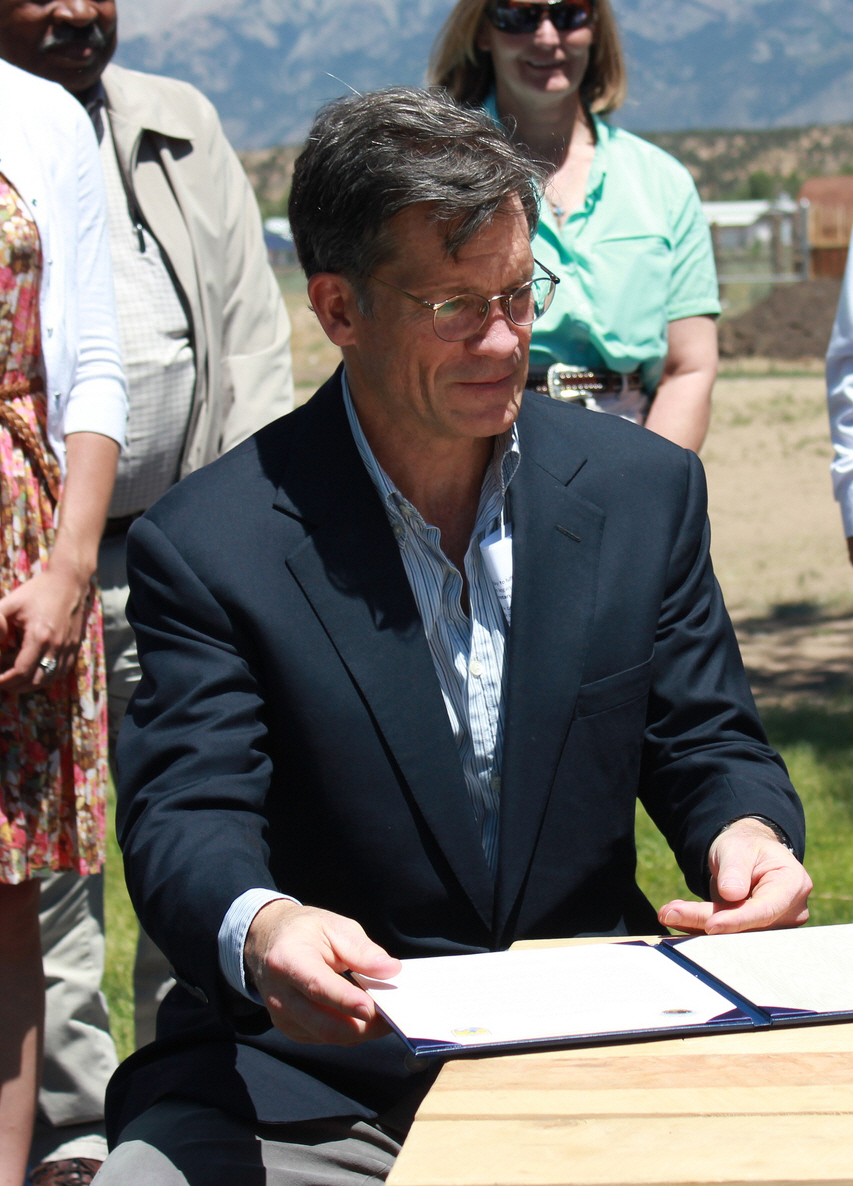
Louis Bacon

- Louis Bacon, hedge fund manager
- Jim Baen (1943–2006), science fiction writer; founded his own publishing house, Baen Books, in 1983
- Cliff Bleszinski, lead designer of the popular Xbox 360 game Gears of War and co-founder of Boss Key Productions
- Anderson Boyd, filmmaker
- Needham B. Broughton, printer, temperance activist, and state senator
- E. Lee Hennessee, pioneer hedge fund manager
- Richard Jenrette, chairman of U.S. Securities and Exchange Commission and international philanthropist, awarded French Ordre national de la Légion d'honneur (National Order of the Legion of Honor) in 1996
- Jesse Lowe, first mayor of Omaha, Nebraska; an important real estate agent in the early city, Lowe is credited with naming the city after the Omaha Tribe
- Anand Lal Shimpi, employee of Apple Inc. and former CEO of AnandTech

== Entertainment ==
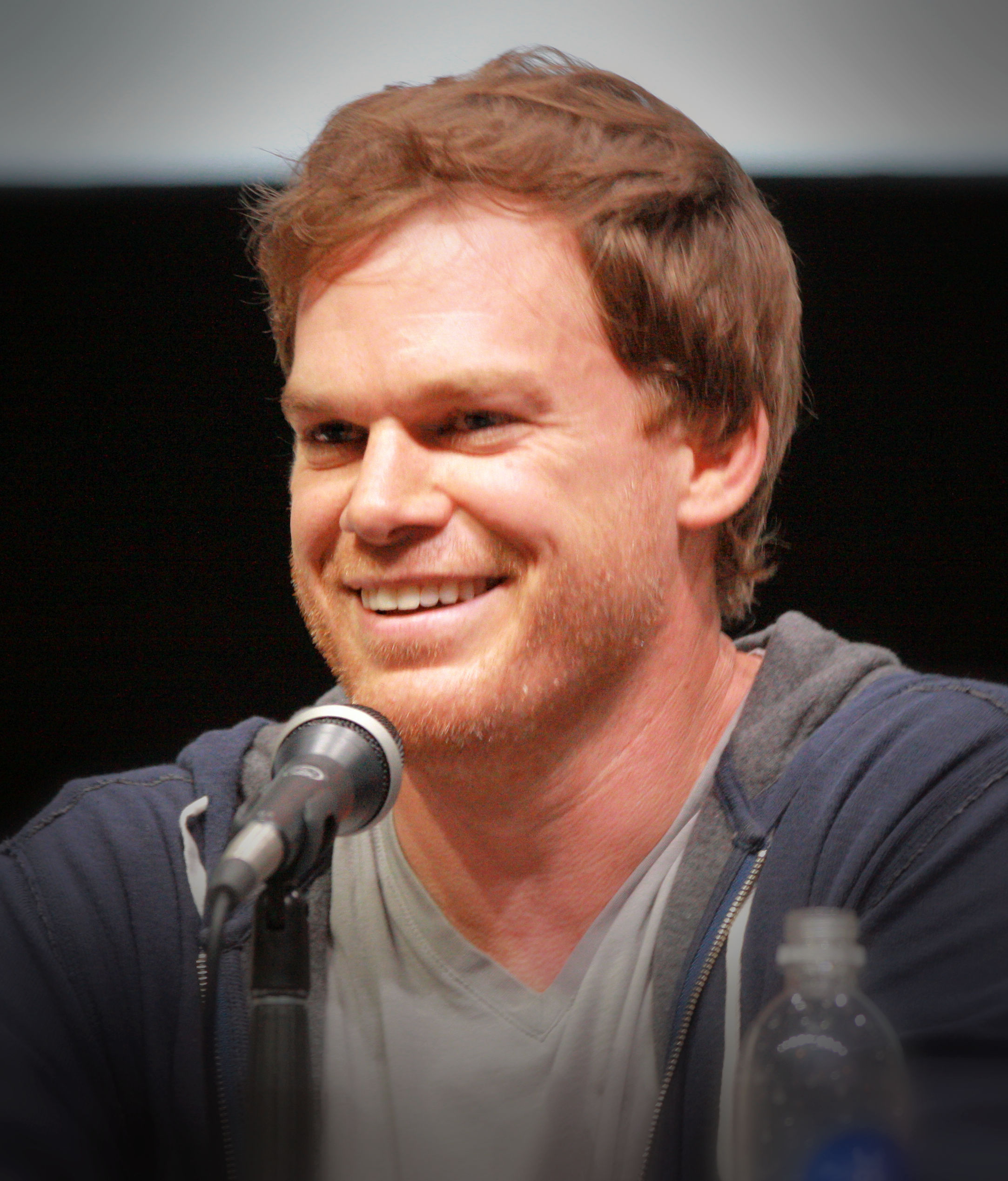
Michael C. Hall

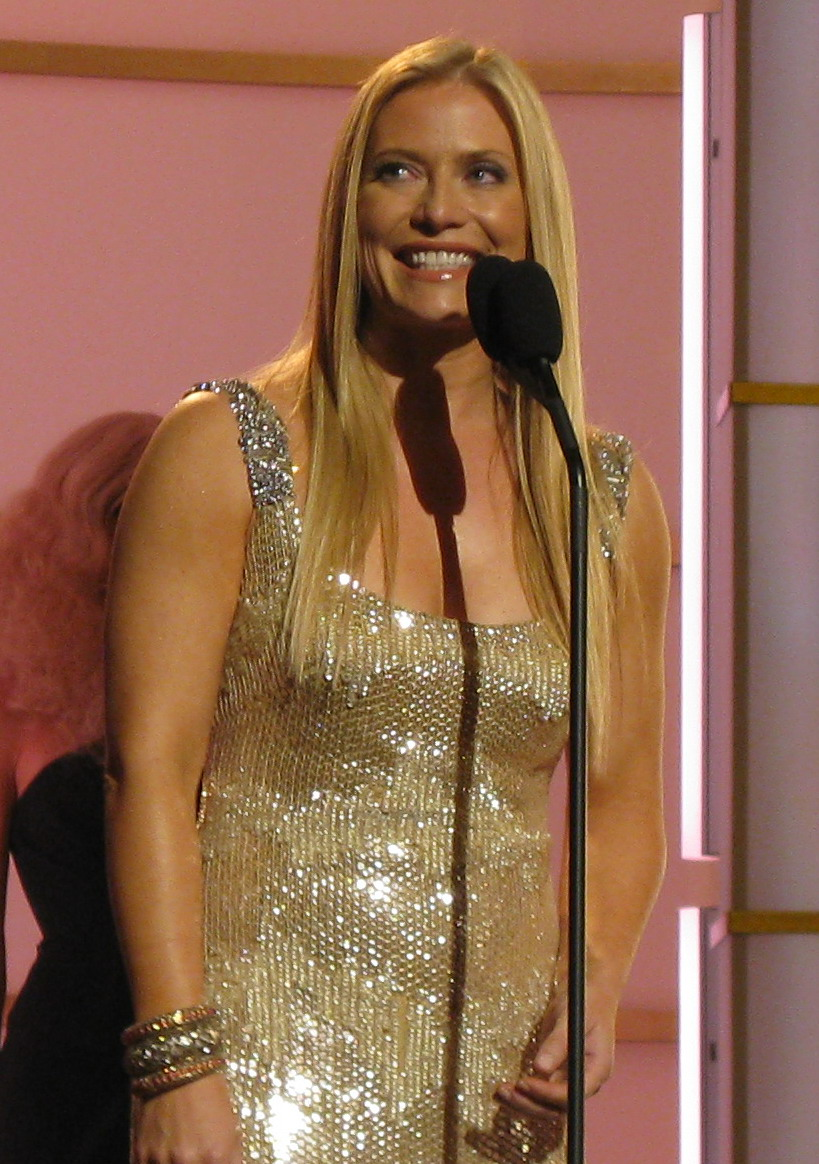
Emily Procter

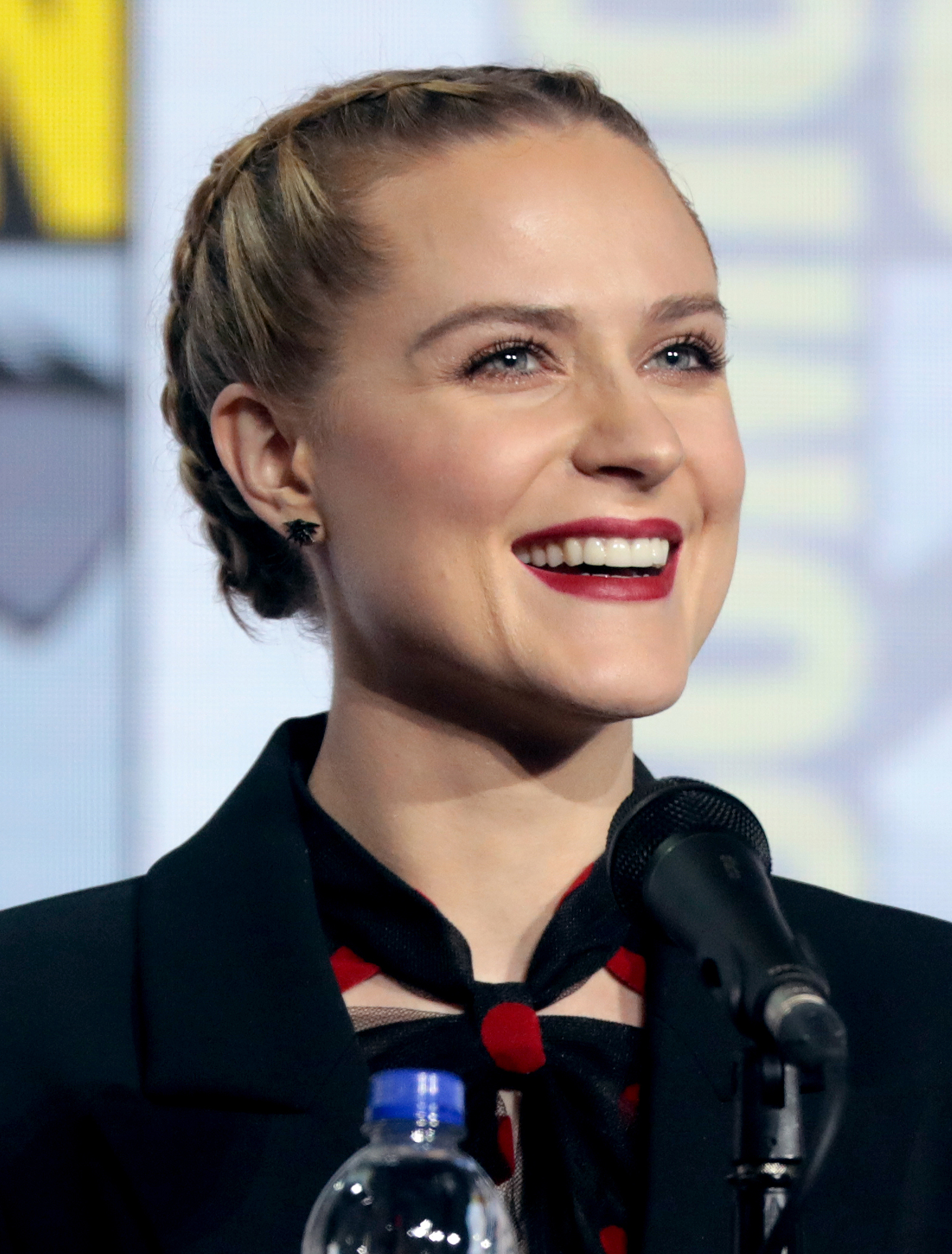
Evan Rachel Wood

- Tyler Barnhardt, actor
- Priscilla Block, singer
- David J. Burke, screenwriter, film and television director
- Antoni Bumba, influencer and astrologer
- Godfrey Cheshire, film writer, director and critic, former chairman of New York Film Critics Circle Awards
- Grady Cooper, director, producer, and Emmy-nominated film editor
- Ariana DeBose, actor and dancer, West Side Story, Hamilton
- Aubrey Dollar, actress
- Caroline Dollar, actress
- Rhoda Griffis, actress
- Michael C. Hall, actor, Dexter, Six Feet Under
- Lauren Kennedy, Broadway actress and singer
- Sharon Lawrence, actress, NYPD Blue
- Beth Leavel, Tony award-winning Broadway actress
- LA Lloyd, nationally syndicated radio host
- Brandi Love, pornography actress
- Robert Duncan McNeill, actor, movie and TV director
- Daniella Monet, actress, singer and dancer
- Karin Muller, writer, filmmaker and photographer for National Geographic Society and National Public Radio
- Emily Procter, actress, CSI: Miami
- Peyton Reed, film director, Ant-Man, The Break-Up, Bring It On
- Hunter Schafer, model, actress, activist, Euphoria
- Amy Sedaris, actress, writer and satirist
- Liz Vassey, actress, CSI
- Reginald VelJohnson, actor, Family Matters
- Evan Rachel Wood, actress, Westworld
- Ira David Wood III, actor and local theatre director

== Military ==
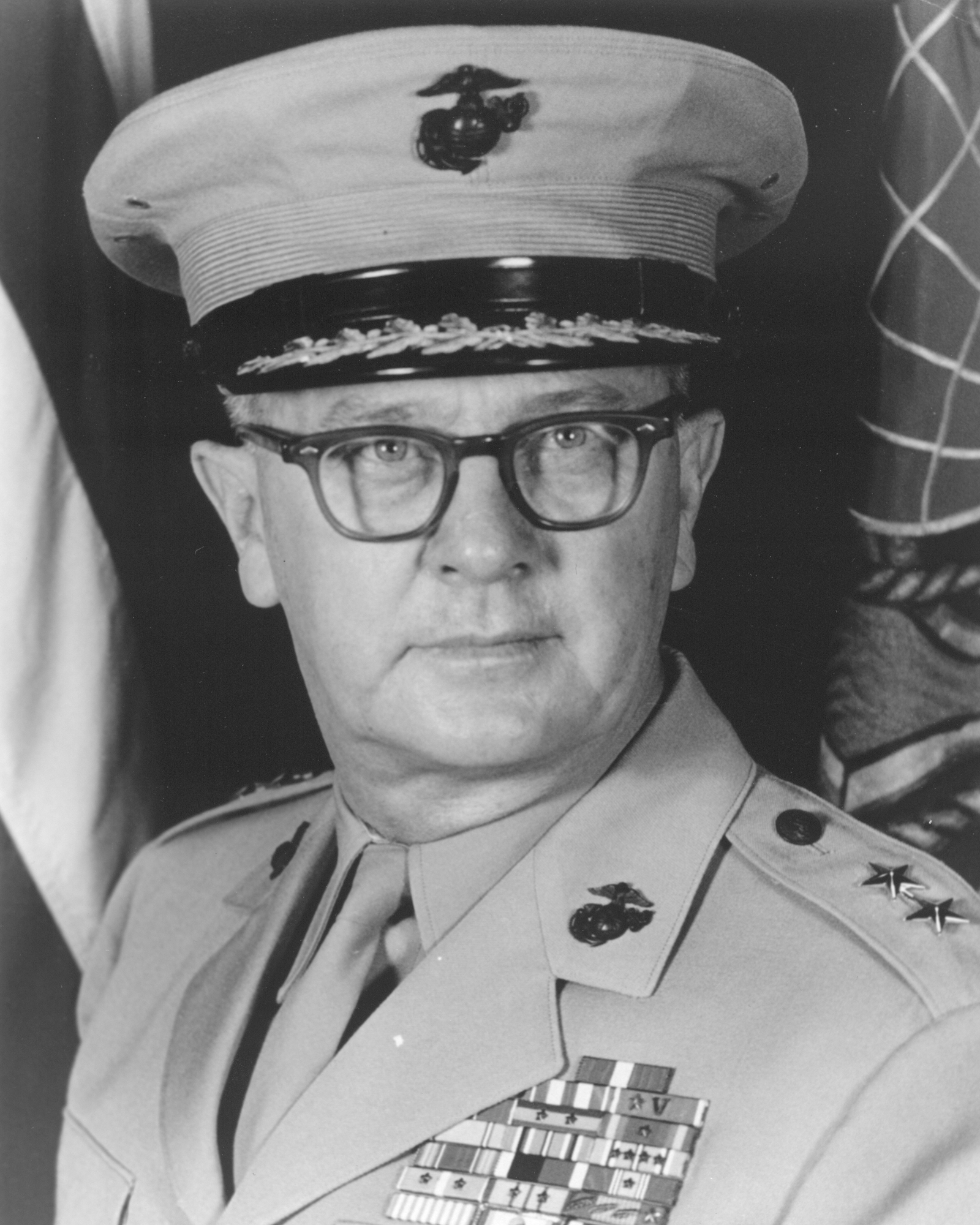
Oscar F. Peatross

- David W. Bagley (1883–1960), admiral in the United States Navy during World War II
- Worth Bagley (1874–1898), United States Navy officer during the Spanish–American War
- Josephus Daniels (1862–1948), newspaper editor and publisher, United States Secretary of the Navy during World War I
- George A. Fisher Jr. (born 1942), former United States Army officer
- Vernon V. Haywood (1920–2003), former U.S. Army Air Force officer, combat fighter pilot/jet pilot, and commanding officer of Tuskegee Airmen's 302nd Fighter Squadron
- Oscar F. Peatross (1916–1993), major general in the United States Marine Corps and recipient of the Navy Cross
- Leonidas Polk (1806–1864), lieutenant general in the Confederate States Army, killed at the Battle of Marietta, Georgia
- Millie Dunn Veasey (1918–2018), served in the Women's Auxiliary Army Corps (WAAC) and later NAACP president of Wake County chapter

== Musicians ==
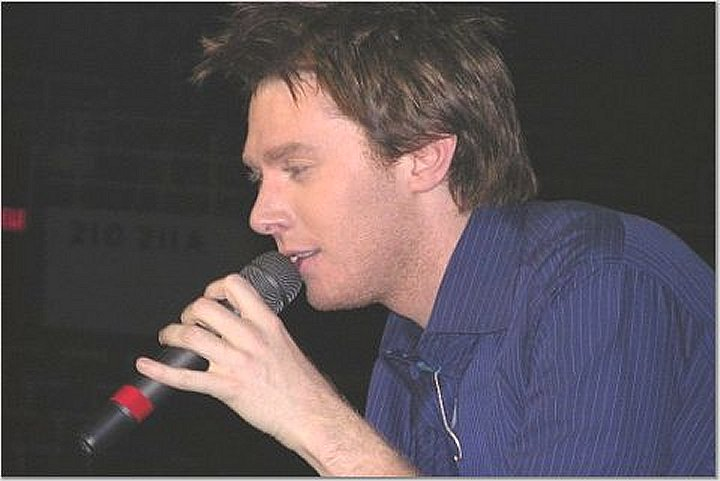
Clay Aiken

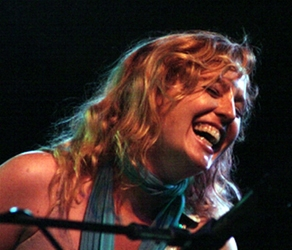
Tift Merritt

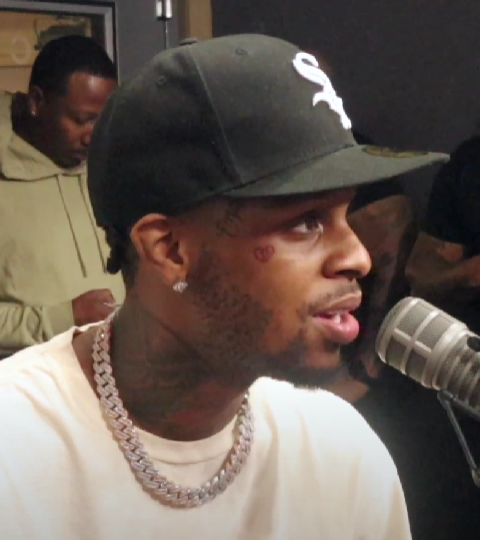
Toosii

- Ryan Adams, singer-songwriter
- Clay Aiken, singer/actor
- Jeb Bishop, jazz musician
- Dan Briggs, bassist for metal band Between the Buried and Me
- Andrew Cadima, composer
- Jason Michael Carroll, country musician
- Caitlin Cary, alternative country singer
- Travis Cherry, Grammy-nominated music producer
- Cordae, hip-hop artist
- John Custer, record producer
- Steve Dobrogosz, pianist and composer
- Robbie Fulks, alt-country singer
- Rufus Harley (1936–2006), jazz musician
- D. Kern Holoman, musicologist and conductor
- Randy Jones (born 1952), original Village People cowboy, singer/actor
- Jon Lindsay, recording artist, producer, activist
- Little Brother, rap group
- Tift Merritt, singer-songwriter
- Pee Wee Moore, jazz musician
- Mic Murphy, frontman for funk/soul group The System, moved to New York before career took off
- NGHTMRE, real name Tyler Marenyi, DJ and trap producer
- Anne-Claire Niver, singer-songwriter
- Petey Pablo, hip-hop artist
- Raleigh Rajan, composer, songwriter whose album made in collaboration with Durham Symphony and Academy-nominated singer Bombay Jayashri became an Amazon top-10 international best seller
- Kate Rhudy, folk-pop and country singer-songwriter and musician
- Blake Richardson, drummer for metal band Between the Buried and Me
- Tommy Giles Rogers, Jr., lead vocalist for heavy metal band Between the Buried and Me
- Toosii, rapper and singer
- Paul Waggoner, guitarist for metal band Between the Buried and Me
- Dustie Waring, guitarist for metal band Between the Buried and Me
- Woody Weatherman, musician

=== Bands and music groups ===
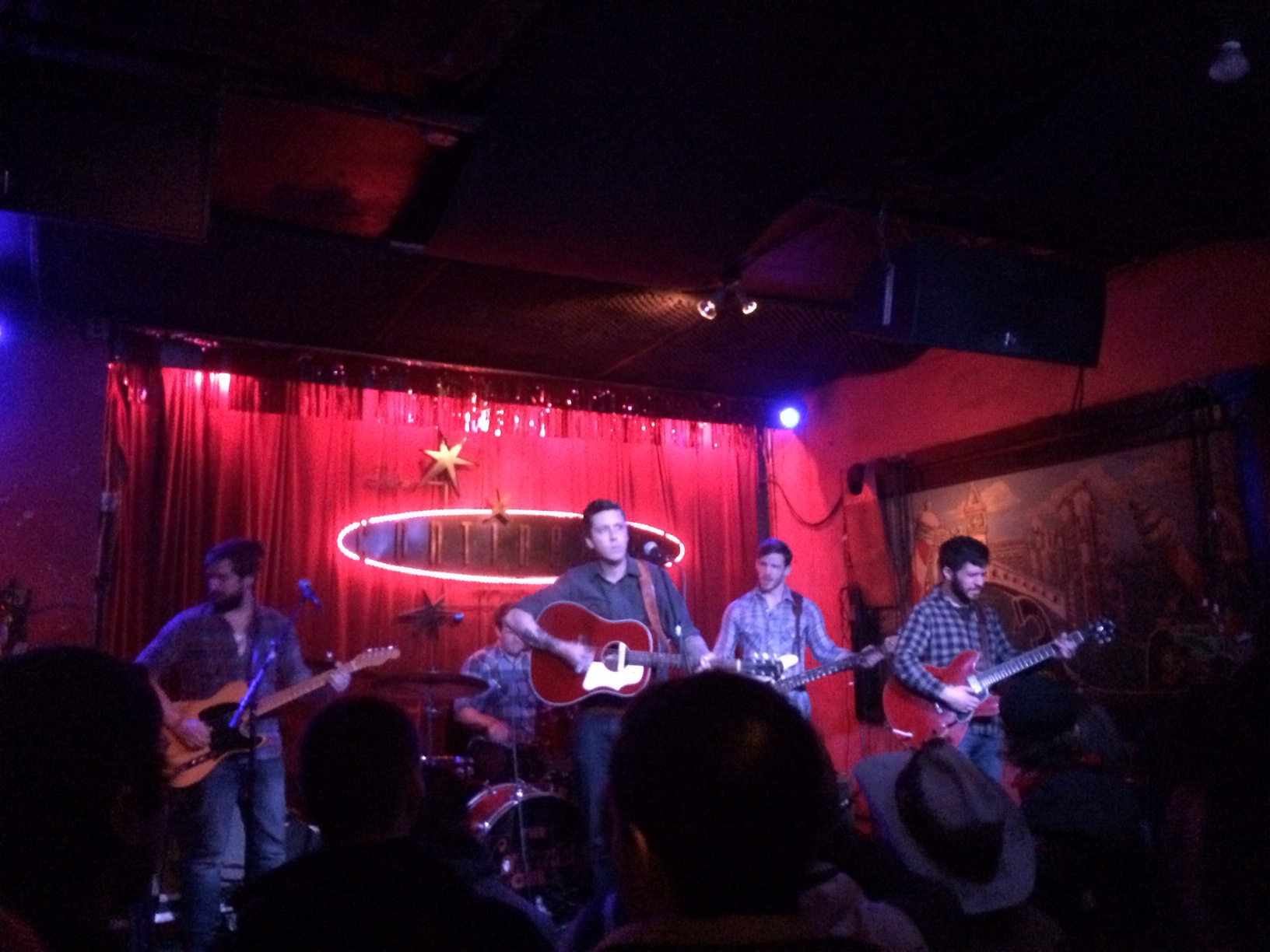
American Aquarium

- Alesana, post-hardcore band
- American Aquarium, alternative country band
- Between the Buried and Me, progressive metal band
- Bowerbirds, freak folk band
- Chatham County Line, bluegrass band
- The Connells, 1980s indie rock band
- Corrosion of Conformity, heavy metal band
- Daylight Dies, doom metal band
- Glass Moon, 1980s progressive rock band
- The Rosebuds, indie rock band
- Selah Jubilee Singers, 1930s–40s gospel quartet
- Troop 41, hip-hop ensemble
- Whiskeytown, 1990s alternative country band

== Politics and law ==
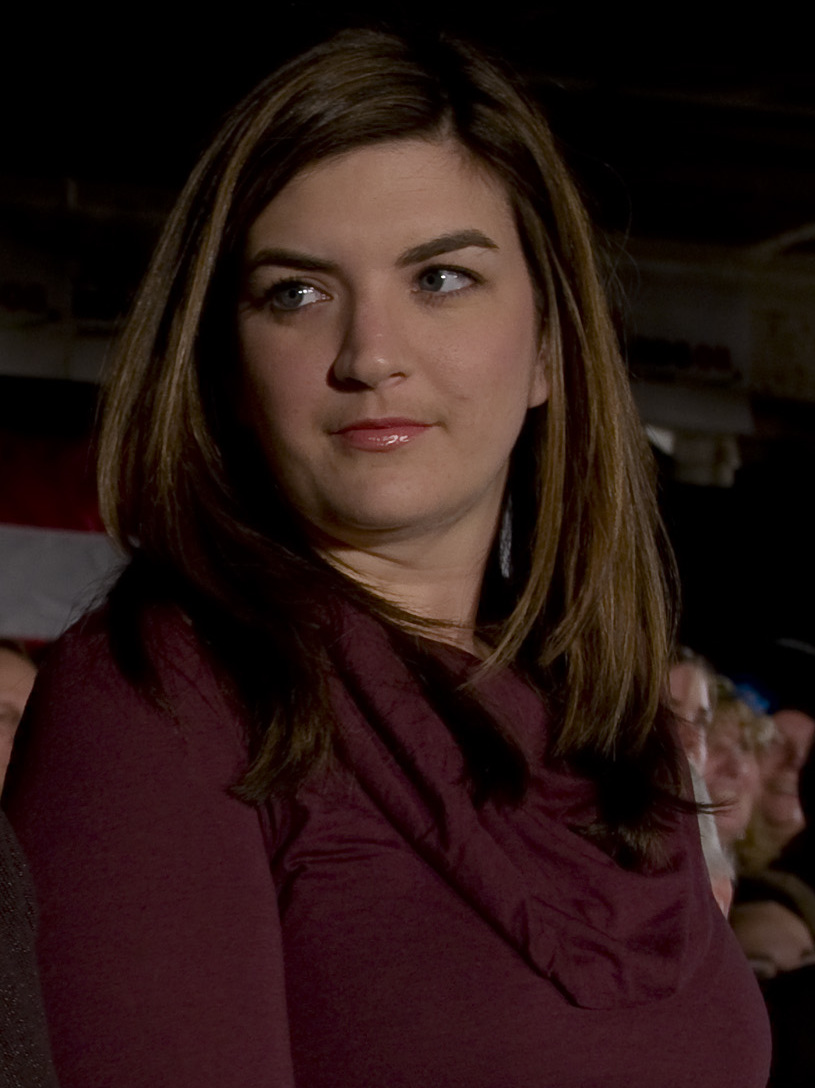
Cate Edwards

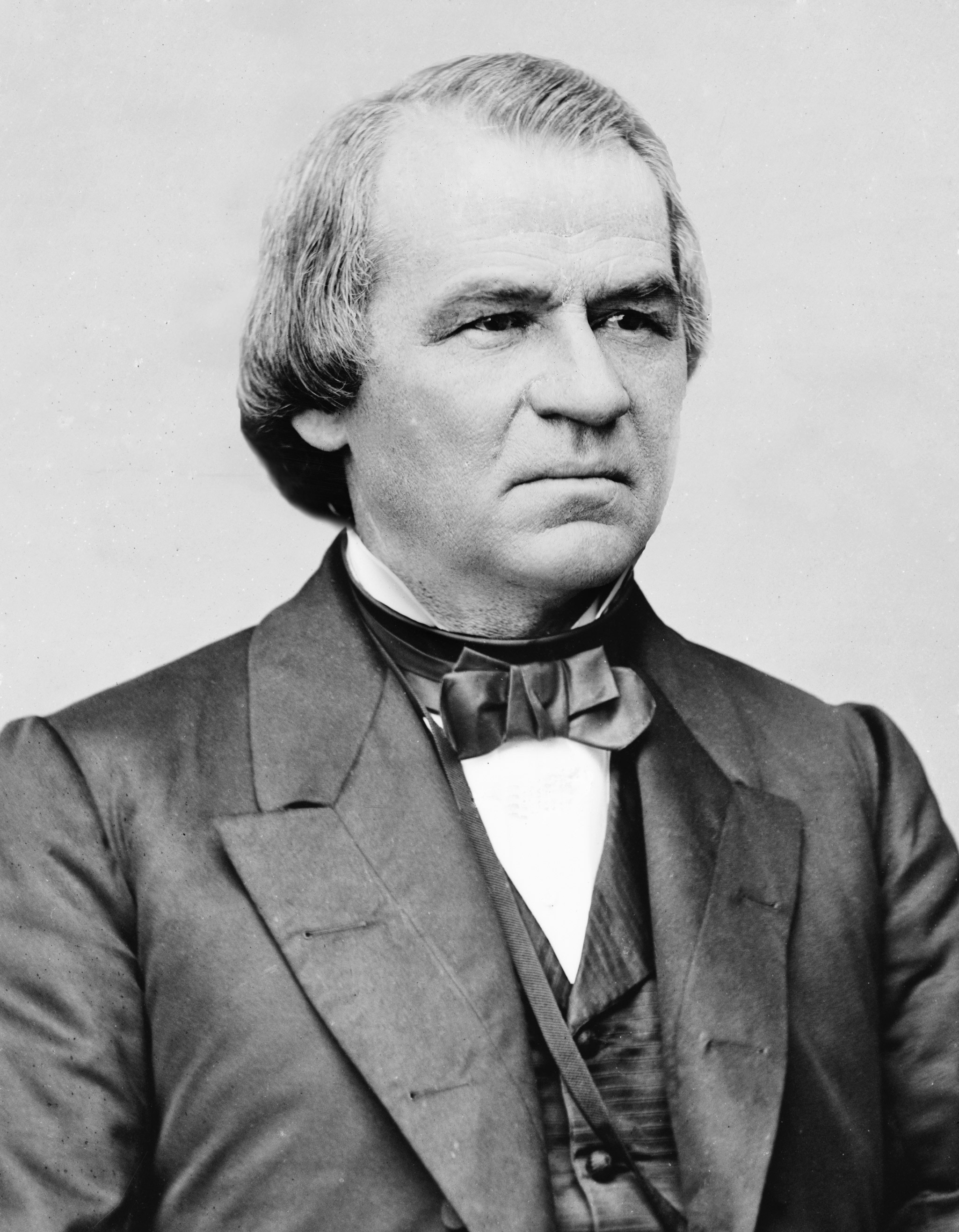
Andrew Johnson

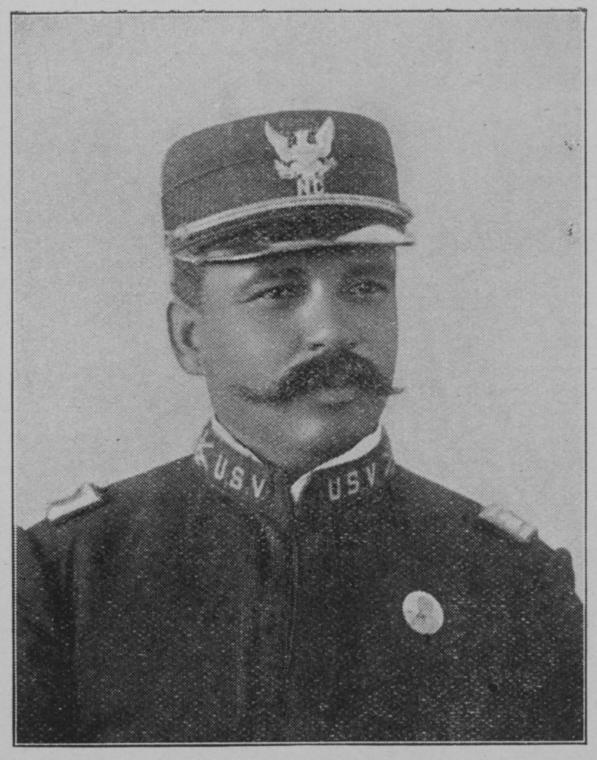
James H. Young

- William H. Bobbitt (1900–1992), former chief justice of North Carolina Supreme Court
- Alice Willson Broughton (1889–1980), former First Lady of North Carolina
- J. Melville Broughton (1888–1949), former governor of North Carolina
- Bill Campbell, two-term mayor of Atlanta
- Ralph Campbell, three-term state auditor and first African-American to hold statewide elected office in North Carolina
- William J. Clarke (1819–1886), Judge on the North Carolina Superior Court
- Paul Coble, 36th mayor of Raleigh (2006–2014)
- S. Thomas Currin II (born 1984), Judge on the North Carolina Superior Court
- Cate Edwards, attorney
- Stormie Forte, lawyer, politician, radio host, and first African-American woman and first openly LGBTQ woman to serve on the Raleigh City Council
- Jim Fulghum (1944–2014), physician and state legislator
- James H. Harris (1832–1891), African-American politician, former slave, co-founder of North Carolina Republican Party
- Winder R. Harris (1888–1973), Democratic United States Congressman
- John Haywood, statesman and the longest-serving North Carolina State Treasurer (40 years)
- William Henry Haywood, Jr. (1801–1852), early Democratic U.S. senator
- Jesse Helms (1921–2008), five-term Republican U.S. senator
- George Holding, Republican United States congressman
- Andrew Johnson (1808–1875), 17th president of the United States
- Calvin Jones (1775–1846), mayor of Raleigh, adjutant general of North Carolina, and founder of Wake Forest College
- Brad Knott, U.S. representative for North Carolina
- Joanna Saleeby Knott, golfer and businesswoman
- Joseph Thomas Knott, assistant U.S. attorney and member of the UNC Board of Governors
- I. Beverly Lake, former chief justice of the North Carolina Supreme Court
- Clarence Lightner (1921–2002), mayor (1973–1975); Raleigh's first popularly elected African-American mayor and first of any major Southern city
- Greg Murphy, physician and politician
- Frank Page (1824–1899), founder of Cary, North Carolina; lived and died in Raleigh
- Deborah Ross, U.S. representative for North Carolina
- Fred Smith, politician
- Avery C. Upchurch (1928–1994), city's longest-serving mayor of the 20th century
- Charles D. Walton (born 1948), first African American to serve in the Rhode Island Senate
- George Smedes York, 33rd mayor of Raleigh (1979–1983)
- James H. Young, African-American politician; founder and editor of Raleigh Gazette, North Carolina's first black-owned newspaper

== Writers ==
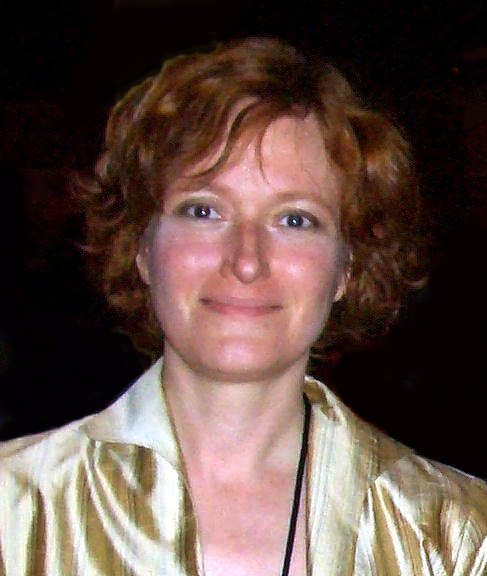
Mary Robinette Kowal

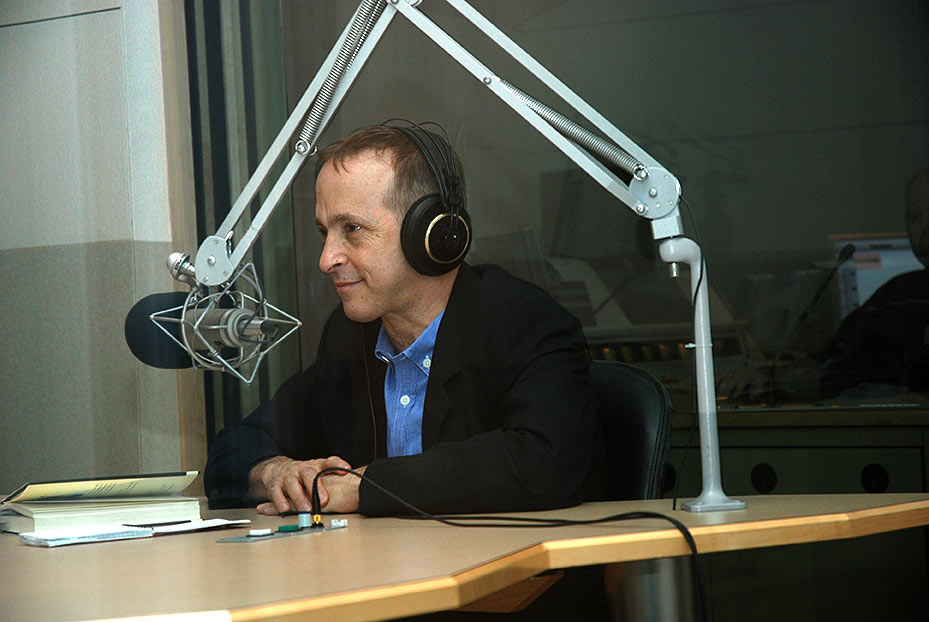
David Sedaris

- Edward A. Batchelor, sportswriter
- Andrew Britton (1981–2008), novelist
- Jonathan W. Daniels (1902–1981), author, editor; White House Press Secretary under presidents Franklin D. Roosevelt and Harry S. Truman
- Thomas Dixon, Jr. (1864–1946), novelist, playwright, minister and statesman
- Elliot Engel, writer, dramatist, lecturer, and academic
- Charles Frazier, novelist, author of Cold Mountain
- Kaye Gibbons, writer
- Mary Robinette Kowal, author
- Eleanor Frances Lattimore, children's writer and illustrator
- Dorianne Laux, poet
- Armistead Maupin, writer
- Mary Lambeth Moore, novelist and podcaster
- Frances Gray Patton (1906–2000), writer, first woman to enroll at University of North Carolina
- Lawson A. Scruggs, early African-American physician in North Carolina and noted publisher of biographies on African-American women
- David Sedaris, author, humorist and satirist
- Lee Smith, writer
- Jan Cox Speas, author and novelist
- Julia Montgomery Street (1898–1993), children's author and playwright

== Other ==
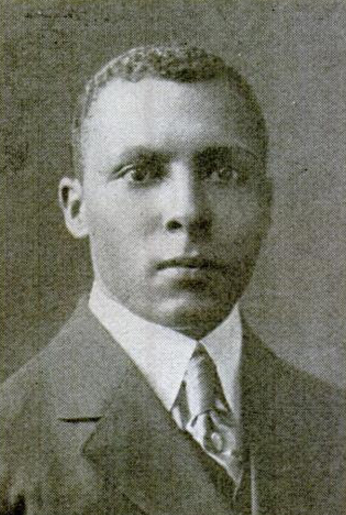
Max Yergan

- Jennifer Berry, Miss America 2006 from Oklahoma
- Bob Caudle, longtime WRAL news personality and host of Mid-Atlantic Championship Wrestling, later headed the Raleigh constituent office of U.S. Senator Jesse Helms
- John Anthony Copeland, Jr. (1834–1859), freed slave, abolitionist and political activist
- James A. Forbes, evangelist preacher, radio host
- William Clyde Gibson, serial killer on death row in Indiana
- T. Adelaide Goodno, president, North Carolina Woman's Christian Temperance Union
- Jacob Johnson, father of U.S. president Andrew Johnson
- Cornelia Alice Norris, socialite and genealogist
- Ray Price, motorcyclist
- Olivia Raney, church organist
- Jacob Tobia, LGBTQ activist
- John P. Turner, African-American physician, surgeon, hospital administrator, and educator
- Max Yergan, African-American activist, first black college faculty member hired in state of New York
