= The Weekly Filibuster =

The Weekly Filibuster was an American talk radio show moderated by politico Ben Goodman of the University of Maine that was usually broadcast on Sunday evenings. The show featured a panel of student commentators including Matt Cavedon of Harvard University, Thomas Dec of Yale University (formerly of The University of Connecticut-Stamford), Robert Burack of the University of Michigan–Flint, Bob Bowen of The University of Michigan, and Abigail Walls of Albion College. The show is best known for its involvement in the July 2008 Sonny Landham scandal.

== History ==
The Weekly Filibuster was founded by Ben Goodman and Tom Dec and launched with special panelist Matt Cavedon on January 12, 2008. Cavedon immediately joined the program as a permanent panelist to represent the political right against the liberal Dec.

The show first gained attention when presidential candidate Alan Keyes announced on the January 26, 2008 program that he was considering leaving the Republican Party. As the Democratic National Committee's struggle with Michigan and Florida's delegates garnered significant media in March, Robert Burack and Bob Bowen of Michigan, and Rebekah Hammond of Florida joined the broadcast to comment on the scandal, and would become permanent panelists. Hammond would leave the show in early summer 2008, but return as a guest panelist during the 2008 Democratic National Convention. The show additionally aired on Wednesday nights during summer 2008 and 2009 as "The Weekly Filibuster: Wednesday Edition" and, alternatively, "The Wednesday Filibuster." Abigail Walls served as a conservative panelist during August 2008, and returned a year later to be named as a permanent contributor to the panel.

The show earned national attention in summer 2008 for its series of interviews with the Kentucky Libertarian Party nominee for United States Senate, Sonny Landham. The show was also featured on Politico.com's KoteckiTV (and subsequently, MSNBC) for hosting a debate between MSNBC-TV's David Shuster and Politico's James Kotecki. The show was among the first in the media to speculate that Sen. John McCain might pick Alaska Governor Sarah Palin as his vice presidential running mate.

The show aired coverage from the floor of the 2008 Democratic National Convention and has featured interviews with many guests including Katrina vanden Heuvel, Chris Cillizza, Gov. Paul Cellucci, Jack Cafferty, Gov. Pete du Pont, Autistic Self Advocacy Network President Ari Ne'eman, James Kotecki, Gov. Jane Swift, David Shuster, Kerry Healey, John Frary, Rabbi Dennis Shulman, Matthew Yglesias, Cyrus Krohn, Rick Noreiga, Joe Lauria, Former Senator Bob Smith, Thurston Clarke, Alan Keyes, Wayne Root, and Rick Davis. Sonny Landham, Mike Gravel, Brian Moore, and Gene Amondson all appeared on the program on multiple occasions.

The show last aired on January 3, 2010.

== Sonny Landham comments ==
Sonny Landham first appeared on The Weekly Filibuster on July 23, 2008, to address controversial comments in the Louisville Courier-Journal. When asked if was calling for the genocide of Arab people. He replied, "I call for outright bombing them back into the sand until they surrender and if they don’t surrender, then you continue the war. Because if you don’t, you will never have peace in the United States. Now do you want peace in the United States or do you want to live to some utopian ideals that are impossible in a world?" He further called for Arabs to be banned from entering the United States, and referred that ethnic group as "camel dung-shovelers", and when questioned on this, suggested using the epithets "rag-heads" and "camel jockeys". Landham was at the time the Libertarian Party nominee for a United States Senate from Kentucky held by Mitch McConnell. On July 28, the Kentucky Libertarian Party asked Landham to withdraw his nomination, cgiting those comments and explaining that his politics did not agree with their platform and values.

== Guest hosts and panelists ==
On several occasions, Tom Dec and Matt Cavedon guest moderated the program, though Burack typically substituted when Ben Goodman was unavailable.

While Robert Burack, Tom Dec, Bob Bowen, and Matt Cavedon appeared regularly, several panelists joined the show for extended stints, including Republican Sage Koontz at The University of Virginia, Jay Gobeil of the University of Maryland, College Park. Several guest panelists have made repeated appearances including Jonathan Padilla at Harvard University and Sam Free at The George Washington University. Ian Engdahl of Rhodes College made one guest appearance and would go on to serve a stint as the show's main announcer and semi-regular newsreader.

Bostonian Peter Christopher of the University of Maine was a frequent substitute and guest panelist. He co-hosted Drive Time, a popular morning show on the University of Maine's WMEB with Goodman during the school year.
