= Raleigh Charter High School =

American public charter school in North Carolina

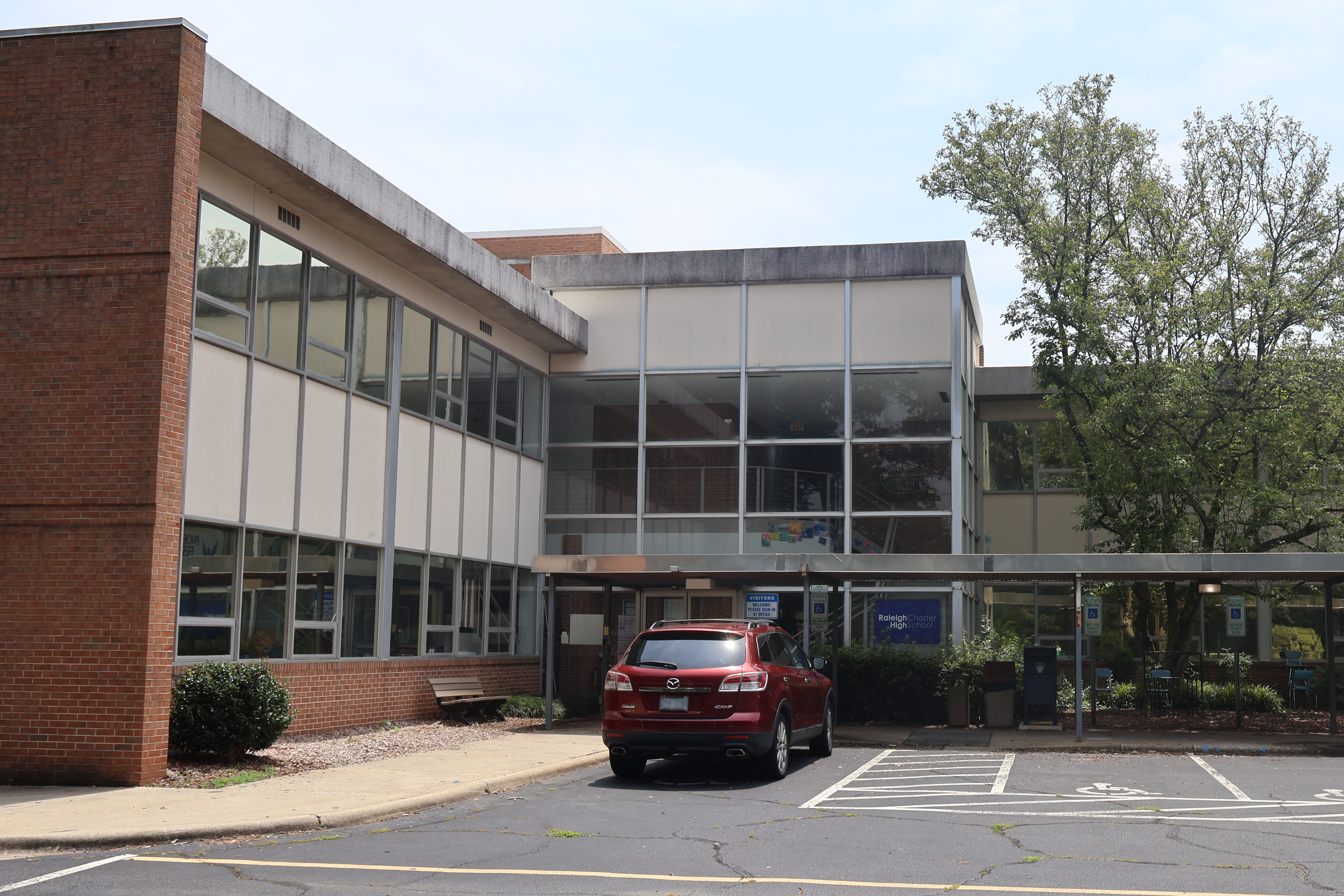
- Front entrance to Raleigh Charter High School

Location
- 1307 Glenwood Avenue; Raleigh, North Carolina 27615; United States; 35°47′46″N 78°38′49″W

Information
- Type: Public charter
- Established: 1999 (27 years ago)
- Locale: Urban
- CEEB code: 343230
- Principal: Lisa Huddleston (2014–present)
- Teaching staff: 44.00 (FTE)
- Grades: 9–12
- Enrollment: 560 (2023–2024)
- Student to teacher ratio: 12.73
- Colors: Blue and White
- Mascot: Phoenix
- Founding Principal: Thomas Humble (1998–2014)
- Website: www.raleighcharterhs.org

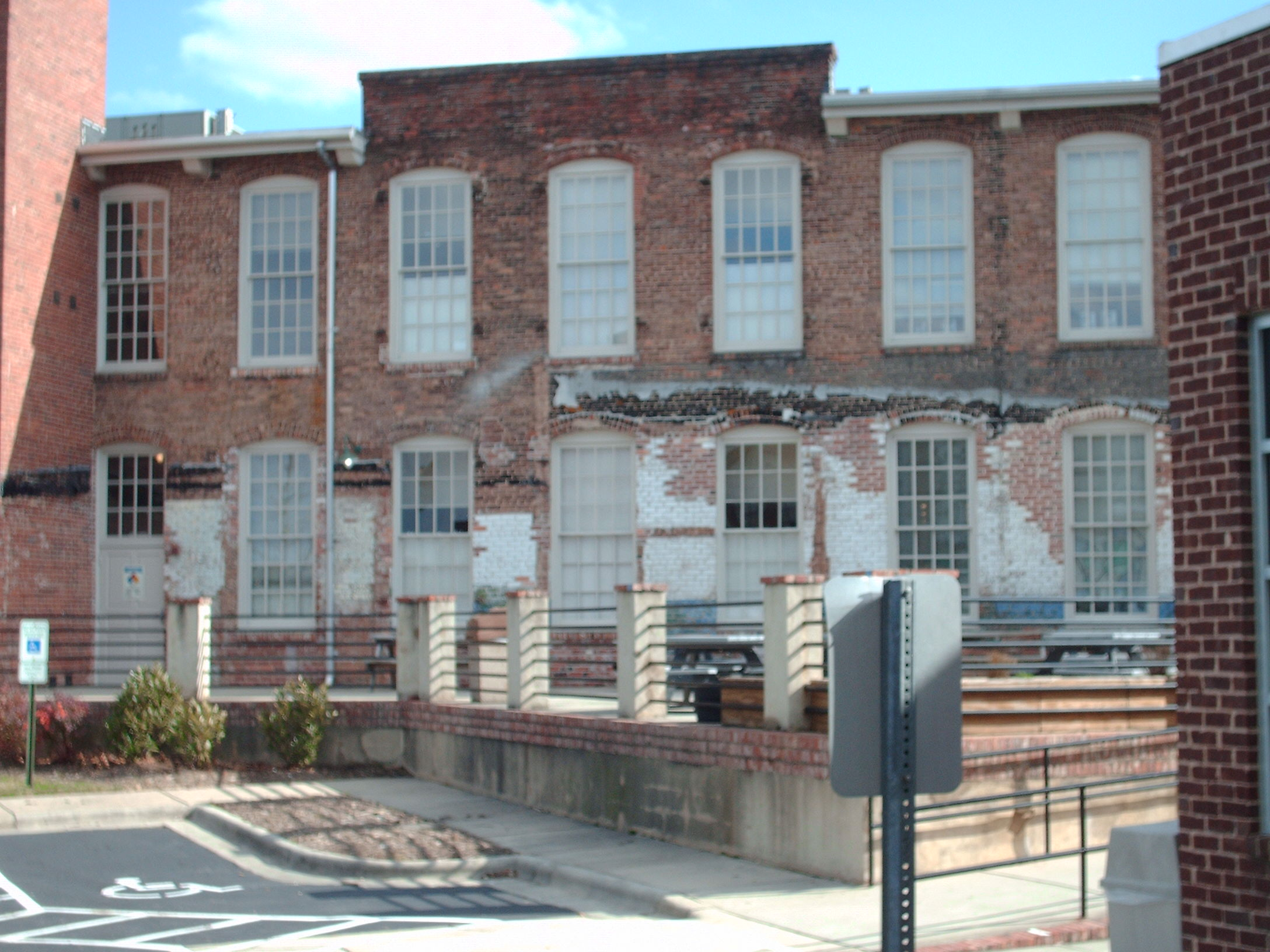
The "100" and "200" Building inside the historic Pilot Mill.

Raleigh Charter High School is a free, independent public school chartered by the North Carolina State Board of Education. It was founded in 1998 by parents of eighth graders at Magellan Charter School.

From its inception through the 2010–2011 school year, Raleigh Charter occupied the historic Pilot Mill behind Peace College in downtown Raleigh. Over the summer of 2011, the school moved to the former Methodist Building on Glenwood Avenue. This location offers proximity to downtown Raleigh; the move, however, was motivated not by dissatisfaction with Pilot Mill, but by financial issues: the school rented its first space, but owns the current one.

Raleigh Charter High School is ranked 5th best Public High School and #1 best Public Charter School within North Carolina. Students have the opportunity to take 19 Advanced Placement course work and exams. The AP participation rate at Raleigh Charter High School is 93 percent and the AP Exam Pass Rate is 93%. The student body makeup is 48 percent male and 52 percent female, and the total minority enrollment is 61 percent.

The school has 70 active student clubs.

As of the 2024-2025 school year, the school's 4-year graduation rate was 95%.

== Honors and awards ==
On December 5, 2008, U.S. News & World Report ranked Raleigh Charter the 21st best high school in the country. In 2005 Raleigh Charter High School was named the ninth best public high school in the nation by Newsweek magazine based on the number of students taking Advanced Placement tests. It was rated number 53 and 18 in 2006 and 2007, respectively. In 2003, 99 percent of tenth grade students at Raleigh Charter High School met or exceeded the requirements of the North Carolina End-of-Course Tests. For five years Raleigh Charter's students have been well ahead the state's high schools in EOC scores. In addition, almost everyone in the senior class of 2004 was accepted into college.

In the College Board's AP Report for 2005, Raleigh Charter High School had the highest percentage of students scoring a 3 or higher on the Environmental Science AP Test for medium-sized schools in the world.

The school also posted the highest average SAT score in the Raleigh Durham area: of 1861 with 100% of students taking the test.

== Athletics ==
Raleigh Charter offers a variety of varsity sports, competing in 1A/2A/3A Diamond Nine Conference of sports sanctioned by the NCHSAA:

- Cross Country
- Varsity Men's and Women's Golf
- Varsity Men's and Women's Basketball
- Varsity Men's and Women's Soccer
- Men's and Women's Swimming
- Men's and Women's Tennis
- Track and Field
- Volleyball

Pickelball, Ping Pong, and Triathlon among others, are offered as club sports.

== State championships ==
- Tennis
  - 2015 Men's
  - 2016 Men's and Women's
  - 2017 Men's and Women's
  - 2018 Men's and Women's
  - 2021 Men's (co-champion)
- Soccer
  - 2007 Women's
  - 2015 Women's
- Swimming
  - 2011 Women's
  - 2012 Women's
  - 2013 Women's
  - 2014 Women's
  - 2015 Women's
  - 2018 Men's and Women's

== Science Olympiad ==
The Raleigh Charter Science Olympiad team first appeared at the national tournament in 2004, after winning the North Carolina state championship. They also won the state tournament in 2007, 2010, and 2013, and have competed at the national tournament ten additional times. Their top national finish was 11th, in 2009.

== Notable alumni ==
- James Kotecki (c/o 2004) – political video blogger
- Kate Rhudy (c/o 2013) — singer and musician
- Jacob Tobia (c/o 2010) – author, television producer and host, LGBTQ rights activist
