= Sonny Landham =

American actor (1941–2017)

- Born: William Marion Landham III; February 11, 1941; Canton, Georgia, U.S.
- Died: August 17, 2017 (aged 76); Lexington, Kentucky, U.S.
- Occupation: Actor
- Years active: 1969–2009

William Marion "Sonny" Landham III (February 11, 1941 – August 17, 2017) was an American actor. He portrayed Billy Bear in 48 Hrs. (1982), tracker Billy Sole in Predator (1987), and 'Chink' Weber in Lock Up (1989).

== Early life and education ==
Landham was born February 11, 1941, in Canton, Georgia, and raised in Rome, Georgia. He was half Cherokee descent, one-eighth Seminole descent, and speculated the rest as German, English, and Irish descent. Landham had at least one sibling, a sister, Dawn.

He attended Saint Mary's Catholic School and Darlington School before playing football for a year at the University of Georgia. Subsequently, he transferred to and graduated from Oglethorpe University. After college, he did a stint in the U.S. Army, worked in an oil field, as an ordained Baptist minister, and a model.

== Career ==
=== Acting career ===
Landham studied acting for two years at Pasadena Playhouse before moving to New York in 1968 to pursue a career in acting. At the beginning of his acting career, Landham was an actor in pornographic films for financial reasons. He also posed for nude layout for Playgirl. He then became a mainstream movie actor and appeared in a number of Hollywood films, including The Warriors (1979) as a subway policeman whose leg gets broken by a baseball bat-wielding Michael Beck, 48 Hrs. (1982), Predator (1987), Action Jackson (1988), and Lock Up (1989).

=== Politics ===
In 2003, Landham ran in the Republican Party primary election for the post of Governor of Kentucky, hoping to repeat the success of his Predator castmate Minnesota Governor Jesse Ventura; later that same year, Arnold Schwarzenegger (another Predator castmate) was elected governor of California. He based his candidacy on opposition to an amendment which endorsed the Kentucky Family Court, saying his bad experiences at the hands of the family court had convinced him it was for the benefit of lawyers rather than families or children. He was unsuccessful in gaining the party's nomination. He ran briefly as an independent candidate, but withdrew on June 18, 2003, and endorsed the Republican slate.

In January 2004, Landham announced his candidacy for the 27th State Senate District of Kentucky. That year he was the keynote speaker at the official launch party of the radio show, The Political Cesspool. In 2005, Landham spoke at the Council of Conservative Citizens (CofCC) convention.

On June 25, 2008, Landham announced his candidacy for the U.S. Senate seat held by Mitch McConnell, as a Libertarian.

On July 23, 2008, Landham appeared on the political radio show The Weekly Filibuster, where he was asked, in relation to past comments of his quoted in the Louisville Courier-Journal, if he was calling for the genocide of Arab people. He replied, "I call for outright bombing them back into the sand until they surrender and if they don't surrender, then you continue the war. Because if you don't, you will never have peace in the United States. Now do you want peace in the United States or do you want to live to some utopian ideals that are impossible in a world?" He further called for Arabs to be banned from entering the United States, and referred to that ethnic group as "camel dung-shovelers", and when questioned on this, suggested using the epithets "rag-heads" and "camel jockeys". On July 28, the Kentucky Libertarian Party asked Landham to withdraw his nomination, citing those comments and explaining that his politics did not agree with their platform and values.

== Personal life ==
Landham was married twice. He had two children, including a son named William, and a daughter named Priscilla.

After being convicted on federal charges of making threatening and obscene phone calls to his wife, Landham spent three years in prison. However, the U.S. Sixth Circuit Court of Appeals reversed the conviction in May 2001.

== Death ==
Landham died on August 17, 2017, aged 76, from congestive heart failure.

== Filmography ==
=== Film ===
Year	Title	Role	Notes
1969	The Lost Man		Uncredited
1971	B.S. I Love You		Uncredited
1974	Special Order	Teamster #1	Uncredited
1974	Come Fly with Us	Joe	
1974	Happy Days	French Cook	
1974	The Love Bus	Amos Johnson	
1974	The Switch or How to Alter Your Ego	Huntington Van Huff	
1974	Cheese		
1974	The Private Afternoons of Pamela Mann	Political Candidate	
1975	The Defiance of Good	Dr. Gabriels Patient	
1975	The Big Con	"Tex"	
1975	The Passions of Carol	Curt Reynolds	
1975	Big Abner	Abner "Big Abner"	
1975	Abigail Leslie is Back in Town	Bo	
1975	Illusion of Love		
1975	Blood Bath		
1976	Virgin Snow	Ben	
1976	Slippery When Wet	Dougie Knowles	
1976	The Honey Cup		
1977	The Trouble with Young Stuff	Lane, The Milkman	
1977	Big Thumbs		
1977	Sylvia	Junkie #1	
1978	The Ganja Express	First Yellow Toga Guy	Uncredited
1978	MisBehavin'	Clyde	
1979	The Warriors	Policeman	
1980	Gloria	Riverside Drive Man	
1981	Southern Comfort	Hunter	
1982	Poltergeist	Pool Worker	
1982	48 Hrs.	Billy Bear	
1984	Fleshburn	Calvin Daggai	
1986	Firewalker	"El Coyote"	
1987	Predator	Billy Sole	
1988	Action Jackson	Mr. Quick	
1989	Lock Up	"Chink" Weber	
1992	Maximum Force	Pimp	
1993	Best of the Best 2	James Lee	
1993	Madame	Hector	
1994	Taxi Dancers	Jim "Diamond Jim"	
1994	Savage Land	Lassiter	
1994	Night Realm	Verrick	
1995	Guns & Lipstick	Albino	
1995	Fatal Choice	"Brick"	
1996	2090	Indian	
1996	Carnival of Wolves	Bodyguard #4	
1996	Billy Lone Bear	Billy Lone Bear	Direct-to-video
2007	Disintegration	Boone Cagle	
2009	Mental Scars	Chief Bear	Direct-to-video

=== Television ===
Year	Title	Role	Notes
1981	B. J. and the Bear	Football Player	Episode: "Beauties and the Beasts"
1984	The A-Team	Ryker	Episode: "The Island"
1984–1985	Call to Glory	Willy Nighthawk	2 episodes
1985	The Dirty Dozen: Next Mission	Sam Sixkiller	Television film
1985	Hardcastle and McCormick	Sheriff Billy Blackstone	Episode: "You Don't Hear the One that Gets You"
1986	Fortune Dane		Episode: "Fortune Dane"
1986	The Fall Guy	Jake	Episode: "War of the Wheel"
1986	North Star	Becker	Television film
1987	Miami Vice	"Toad"	Episode: "Viking Bikers from Hell"
1992	Three Days To A Kill	Pepe	Television film
1993	Extralarge: Condor Mission	Indian	Television film
