= Leesville Road High School =

Public school in North Carolina, United States

Coordinates: 35.89082°N 78.71851°W

- Home of the Pride

Location
- 8410 Pride Way; Raleigh, North Carolina 27613; United States

Information
- Type: Public
- Motto: "We are the Pride"
- Established: 1993 (33 years ago)
- School district: Wake County Public School System
- CEEB code: 343214
- Principal: Shejuanna Jacobs
- Teaching staff: 122.86 (on an FTE basis)
- Grades: 9–12
- Enrollment: 2,411 (2024–2025)
- Student to teacher ratio: 19.62
- Campus: The Leesville Complex
- Colors: Navy blue and Kelly green
- Athletics: NCHSAA 8A
- Athletics conference: CAP 8A
- Nickname: "The Ville" (Village)
- Newspaper: The Mycenaean
- Website: Leesville Road High School

Leesville Road High School (also known locally as Leesville High School, abbreviated as LRHS), is a comprehensive public high school located in Raleigh, North Carolina. It is a part of the Wake County Public School System. Established in 1993, it has approximately 2,500 enrolled students and offers a variety of extracurricular activities, including band, computer science club, solar car team, model UN, foreign language, newspaper, yearbook, National Honor Society, Student Council, Speech and Debate, and many other clubs.

== History ==
The school was established in 1993 as part of Wake County's plan to provide education for the growing northwestern region of the county, which was a larger project including Leesville Road Elementary and Middle School. All three schools lie adjacent to each other on 98 acres, originally costing around $95 million to construct.

Anthony J. "A.J." Mutillo was principal from 2012 until 2018, when he became the district's assistant superintendent for human resources. The News & Observer described him as "popular".

== Academics ==
Leesville Road High School has consistently ranked as a North Carolina School of Distinction. Leesville Road High School is a high-performing comprehensive high school with nationally recognized academic, athletic, and fine arts programs. It is one of 27 high schools in the Wake County Public School System, the largest school system in the state. Leesville offers its students a wide variety of advanced and 17 Advanced Placement (AP) courses in various subjects. 28% of their students participate in their AP program. Leesville also offers the following foreign language courses: Spanish, French, and Latin. In math and English EOC scores, Leesville ranks above the North Carolina average. In 2005, Leesville scored 90% and 92% in English and Math, higher than the state averages of 82% and 80%.

The school posted the tenth highest average SAT score in the Raleigh-Durham area: 1641 with 76.6% of students taking the test. "AthleticsThe GreatSchools rating is a simple tool for parents to compare schools based on test scores. It compares schools across the state, where the highest rated schools in the state are designated as "Above Average" and the lowest "Below Average." It is designed to be a starting point to help parents make baseline comparisons. We always advise parents to visit the school and consider other information on school performance and programs, as well as consider their child's and family's needs as part of the school selection process." The school is located in Wake County, North Carolina, an area frequently ranked as one of the nation's best places to live and work. The school system employs over 18,000 staff and faculty to support more than 157,000 students in total.

== Athletics ==
Leesville Road is a member of the North Carolina High School Athletic Association (NCHSAA) and is classified as an 8A school. The school is a part of the CAP 8A Conference. The school offers varsity and junior varsity teams in football, baseball, men's basketball, women's basketball, men's soccer, women's soccer, cheerleading, volleyball, women's lacrosse, and men's lacrosse and varsity teams only in Men's Tennis, Women's Tennis, Men's Golf, Women's Golf, Swimming/Diving, Gymnastics, Wrestling, Cross Country, Indoor Track and softball.

The school is well known for its football team, which qualified for the NCHSAA 4AA playoffs for 10 consecutive seasons and compiled an 88–28 record over that span. The team also reached the 4AA playoff semi-finals in 2007 and the quarterfinals in 2011 and 2012. The team advanced to its first state championship game in 2019, where it fell to Vance High School in the final.

The football team plays its home games on-campus at Marshall L. Hamilton Stadium, which has a capacity of 3,500, and includes a student section known as the "Leesville Loonies". Leesville soccer and lacrosse teams also play in the same venue.

The 2011 Leesville Road baseball team posted the best record in school history going 23–4 and making it to the Eastern Semifinals before falling to Holly Spring and Carlos Rodon.

Leesville women's soccer won the NCHSAA 4A state championship in 2008, 2009, and 2011.

In their 2012 season, the Leesville women's volleyball team held an overall record of 27-1 (14-0 in conference). The team competed in the NCHSAA 4A state championship final, finishing as runner-up for their first and only loss of the season.

== Notable alumni ==
- Clay Aiken, singer and songwriter
- Hannah Aspden, American Paralympic swimmer
- Beau Atkinson, college football defensive end for the North Carolina Tar Heels
- Braxton Berrios, NFL wide receiver and return specialist
- Priscilla Block, country music singer and songwriter
- Andrew Britton, author
- Ryan Clifford, baseball player
- Grayson Murray, professional golfer
- Doc Redman, professional golfer
- Anthony Richardson, professional basketball player
- Brian Rimpf, NFL offensive tackle for the Baltimore Ravens
- Shawan Robinson, professional basketball player
- Kimber Rozier, rugby player, 2013 World Cup Sevens bronze
- Leigh Smith, Olympic javelin thrower at the 2008 Summer Olympics
- D.J. Thompson, professional basketball player
