= Pullen Memorial Baptist Church =

Baptist church in Raleigh, North Carolina

Coordinates: 35°47′7″N 78°39′39″W

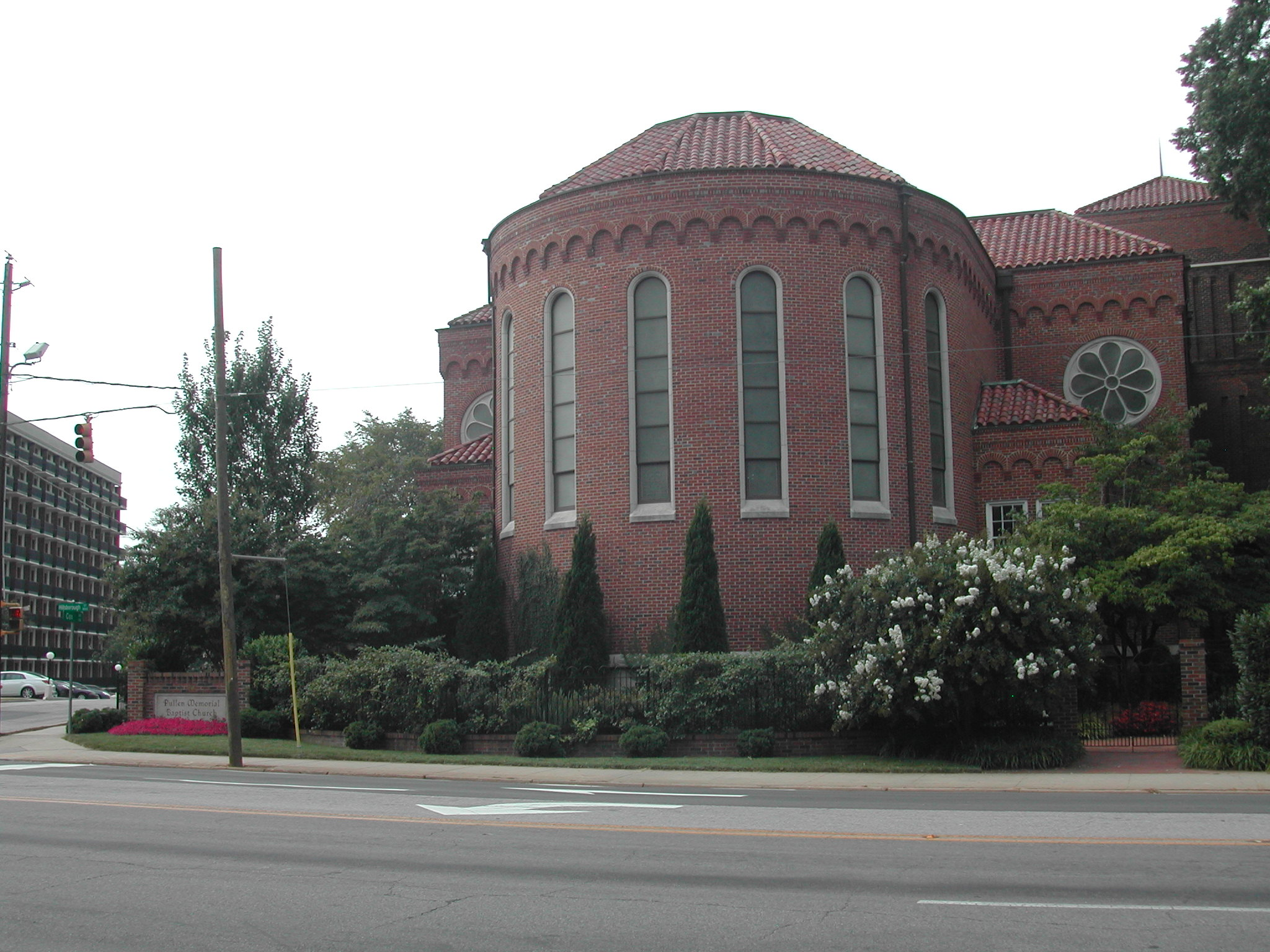
- Pullen Memorial Baptist Church in 2006
- Pullen Memorial Baptist Church
- Location: Raleigh, North Carolina, United States
- Denomination: Baptist
- Website: http://www.pullen.org

Architecture
- Functional status: Active

Pullen Memorial Baptist Church is a progressive Baptist church located in Raleigh, North Carolina, US, right beside North Carolina State University. Pullen, called "a fiercely independent Baptist church" whose traditions have "earned it a reputation far and wide as the South's premier liberal church," has a long history of civil rights activism, and is currently a leader on key issues of the day, from LGBTQ rights to activism in Moral Monday protests to alliances with like-minded people in distant places from Cuba to Nicaragua to Georgia in the Caucasus Mountains and Black Sea.

Pullen is led by the Dr. Reverend Nancy Petty.

In the last two decades, social issues have included Pullen Memorial's stance on sexual issues. In 1992 the Southern Baptist Convention expelled the church for its blessing a same-sex union. In 2002, lesbian minister Nancy Petty was selected to be co-pastor with Jack McKinney, making Pullen the first Baptist church in the South known to have chosen an openly homosexual person as lead clergy. Pullen has been marrying and blessing the unions of same-sex couples ever since.

Pullen's Sunday service was named "The Best Sermon to Hear on a Sunday Morning" by the Independent Weekly, a local progressive newspaper based in Durham.

The church has alliances and affiliations with the Alliance of Baptists, American Baptist Churches – USA, Association of Welcoming and Affirming Baptists, Baptist Peace Fellowship of North America, Bread of the World, Church Women United, Community of the Cross of Nails, Historic Thousands on Jones Street People's Assembly, Martin Street Baptist Church, North Carolina Council of Churches, and the Triangle Interfaith Alliance.

== History ==
The church began in 1884 as a mission of First Baptist Church and was organized on December 28, 1884 as Fayetteville Street Baptist Church. It renamed itself in 1913 after the death of John T. Pullen, who had been a lay leader of the church. J.A. Ellis, who became the pastor in 1919, was the first of many Pullen preachers known for applying the Bible to justify controversial social issues. In 1921 the church's Fayetteville Street building was destroyed by a fire and the congregation began holding services in Pullen Hall on the campus of North Carolina State College (now known as North Carolina State University). The church moved to its current location on Hillsborough Street in 1923.

E. McNeill Poteat Jr. succeeded Ellis as pastor in September 1929. Beginning in 1933, Pullen began to accept Christians from non-Baptist denominations as "associate members," who were unable to vote or hold office in the church. Lee C. Sheppard then served as pastor from 1937 to 1947, followed by Poteat once again until his death in 1956.

William Wallace Finlator (1913–2006) became pastor in 1956 and served until 1982. He was known for taking challenging stands on social issues, helping cement the church's reputation as liberal. Rev. Jack McKinney described Finlator as "one of the most loved--and most despised--North Carolinians of his day". In 1958 under Finlator's leadership, Pullen Memorial "declared itself open to all people regardless of race". Finlator promoted integration of North Carolina schools. During the volatile years of the Civil Rights Movement, African Americans considered Pullen Memorial a "safe haven", one of the few predominantly white churches where people could have an open discussion about the movement and not risk backlash. Finlator spoke strongly against segregation and, during the 1970s, against the Vietnam War.

The 1958 church constitution "affirmed the acceptance into full membership of Christians who transferred membership from other denominations". Baptist practice generally only accepts those who have accepted Christ and been baptized by immersion. In the early 1970s, some members of the State Baptist Convention attempted to oust Pullen Memorial, along with twelve other churches, for that position, but they were unsuccessful.

Finlator was succeeded as pastor in 1983 by M. Mahan Siler Jr., who would serve until 1998. During his tenure, the church staff expanded to include a minister to children, a minister to youth, a minister to the community, and a church administrator.

During the 1980s under President Ronald Reagan's build-up of the Defense Department, the church was active in opposing the nuclear arms race.

In 1986, Pullen Church began a sister-church relationship with Martin Street Baptist Church, a black congregation in Raleigh. Two years later, Pullen also became a sister-church with the First Baptist Church of Matanzas, Cuba. Pullen members have since gone on several trips to Cuba, helping the First Baptist Church with building and community projects.

In 1992, the congregation of Pullen Memorial "endorsed unqualified acceptance of homosexual Christians and their full participation in the life and work of the church". This endorsement and the church's blessing of a same-sex union led to its expulsion from the Raleigh Baptist Association, the Baptist State Convention of North Carolina, and the Southern Baptist Convention (SBC). The SBC also expelled Binkley Memorial in Chapel Hill, North Carolina, for allowing a gay person to preach.

After Siler's retirement in 1998, Jack McKinney became pastor in 2000, and in May 2002 the congregation voted to call Nancy E. Petty as co-pastor alongside McKinney. Petty's promotion made history for Pullen in multiple ways, but according to Religion News Service, "the 192-59 vote ... was memorable for its lack of discussion about Petty's sexual orientation. Congregants ... were more concerned with the model of dual leadership and whether it would be a good way to run their church."

Reverend Jack McKinney serves on the steering committee of the North Carolina Religious Coalition for Marriage Equality, which continues to sponsor speakers on this issue. In 2006, Raleigh native James A. Forbes, senior pastor of the historic Riverside Church in New York City, spoke at an interfaith service at Pullen Memorial and addressed issues of sexuality and rights in the United States.

In 2002, McKinney wrote an op-ed in The News & Observer expressing his concerns about sex education in the Wake County Public School System. He stated,

The most trusted medical and scientific institutions in our nation recommend sexuality education that includes age-appropriate and medically accurate information about abstinence and contraception. But we don't have that in Wake County. We have a strict abstinence-based curriculum that is driven by conservative religious values, has no track record of success and ignores the complicated and frightening realities in which our children live.

McKinney endorsed the Planned Parenthood Clergy Advisory Board statement on sexuality education.

During the time leading up to the Iraq War, McKinney spoke out against the invasion saying, "If the church feels the government is over-reaching, we have to stand up and say we don't think this is wise."

People of Faith Against the Death Penalty awarded Pullen Memorial its 2005 Faith in Action Award for its stance and work against the death penalty. Jack McKinney has called for a moratorium on executions in North Carolina.

In early 2009, Pullen opened a building expansion that added an additional 9,800 sq ft (910 m^{2}) to its facilities. The congregation made sustainability an integral part of the plan. The building plan was recognized by the North Carolina Chapter of the American Institute of Architects for its design and use of solar energy, green roofs, and water recycling. The expansion is heated and cooled by a geothermal heat pump.

Pullen reports membership of over 700 and about 1200 "active participants."

McKinney stepped down in September 2009, leaving Nancy Petty as the church's sole pastor.

== Notable parishioners ==
- Lisa Grabarek, American teacher and Baptist preacher
- Mary Lambeth Moore, American novelist and podcaster
- Kate Rhudy, American singer-songwriter and musician

== See also ==
- Ecumenism
- Homosexuality and Baptist churches
- Progressive Christianity
- The Religious Institute on Sexual Morality, Justice, and Healing
