= James Kotecki =

James Kotecki (born October 23, 1985, in Syracuse, New York) is an American commentator and video blogger, hosting podcasts and video interviews for CES and other tech-related platforms, covering topics such as artificial intelligence and climate technology. He began his career in college with a YouTube series on the role of video sharing in U.S. politics, later joining Politico as one of the first national video bloggers.

== Education ==
James Kotecki graduated from Raleigh Charter High School and then, magna cum laude, from Georgetown University in May 2007 with a Bachelor of Science in Foreign Service.

As a senior student at Georgetown, Kotecki spent his spare time in his dormitory, creating videos critiquing the 2008 presidential campaign candidates and posting them on YouTube.

== Career ==
He rose to prominence during the 2008 United States presidential election cycle.

His witty and slightly cynical remarks and occasional rapping and playing the guitar in his videos had caught the attention of many people including politicians who agreed to appear in his dormitory for an interview; namely, Mike Gravel, former Democratic United States Senator from Alaska and a candidate in the 2008 presidential election, and Ron Paul, Republican Congressman for the State of Texas. Kotecki was also able to interview Democratic presidential candidate Dennis Kucinich.

Kotecki's video commentaries attracted Politico and offered him full-time employment as a video blogger. At Politico, Kotecki wrote, produced and hosted his online video series, KoteckiTV.

Kotecki later did public policy research and analysis for The Cypress Group. As of 2024, he hosts podcasts and conducts interviews at CES. Currently, he serves as Chief Storytelling Officer at Agerpoint, an AI company focused on agriculture and nature and resides with his family in North Carolina's Research Triangle.
