= Shawan Robinson =

American basketball player

Personal information
- Born: September 7, 1983 (age 43) Boone, North Carolina, U.S.
- Listed height: 6 ft 2 in (1.88 m)
- Listed weight: 180 lb (82 kg)

Career information
- High school: Leesville Road (Raleigh, North Carolina)
- College: Clemson (2002–2006)
- NBA draft: 2006: undrafted
- Playing career: 2006–2009
- Position: Point guard / shooting guard

Career history
- 2006–2007: Newcastle Eagles
- 2007–2008: Gießen 46ers
- 2008: Skyliners Frankfurt
- 2008–2009: BK NH Ostrava

Shawan Robinson (born September 7, 1983) is an American former professional basketball player. He played college basketball at Clemson University and professionally played in Europe.

Robinson attended Clemson for 4 years. In his final year (the 2005/2006 season) he averaged a team leading 12.3ppg and a free throw percentage of 91.3%, enough to have him ranked 3rd in the nation. This percentage was also the fourth best in the history of the ACC.

Robinson became the first Clemson Tiger to be named Academic All-ACC in each of his four seasons. He was a student teacher at Central Elementary and graduated with an Elementary Education degree in 2006.

Robinson signed with Ostrava after a brief stint with the Deutsche Bank Skyliners from Germany. He spent the 2006/2007 season in England where he led the British Playoff Champions with 16 ppg and 4 assist, and 2007/2008 season in Giessen Germany where he averaged 3.1 ppg in limited action. As of January 11, 2009, Robinson was averaging 16.32 ppg to go along with 3.5 apg and 3.7 rpg, and 32% on threes for NH Ostrava.

In 2014, Robinson was named head coach of the Panther Creek High School boys basketball team.
