= Kate Rhudy =

21st-century American singer-songwriter and musician

- Origin: Raleigh, North Carolina; United States
- Genres: Folk-pop, Country, Americana
- Occupations: singer-songwriter, musician
- Instruments: vocals, violin, fiddle, mandolin, guitar
- Years active: 2016–present
- Website: katerhudy.com

Kate Austin Rhudy is an American folk-pop and country singer-songwriter, musician, and recording artist. Trained as a classical violinist, she played in multiple local bands in Boone, North Carolina as a fiddler before moving to Nashville to further pursue a career in music. She later moved to back to her hometown, Raleigh, and began performing as a solo artist. In 2017, she released her debut album, Rock N' Roll Ain't For Me. In 2022, she released her second album, ”Dream Rooms” which she debuted at the Raleigh Rose Garden selling out her show.

== Early life and education ==
Rhudy is from Raleigh, North Carolina. She attended Raleigh Charter High School, where she ran cross country, was on the swim team, and was one of three captains on the soccer team. She later attended Appalachian State University for three years, but left school in 2016 to pursue a career in music. As a child, Rhudy trained in classical violin, in the Suzuki method, and grew up around acoustic music, often attending fiddler's conventions in Southwestern Virginia with her older sister. She started playing the fiddle when she was five and the mandolin when she was nine. Rhudy was raised Baptist, and attended Pullen Memorial Baptist Church, which was kicked out of the Southern Baptist Convention for supporting LGBTQ rights.

== Career ==
Rhudy played fiddle and sang harmonies as a member of the band Andy Ferrell and Oncoming Train. She sang two solos for the band, covers of Jolene by Dolly Parton and You Ain't Woman Enough by Loretta Lynn. Rhudy's song The Only Pretty Thing in Texas is about her time in the band.

Rhudy worked with Andrew Marlin of Mandolin Orange to produce her debut album, Rock N' Roll Ain't For Me, in 2017. The album was inspired by Rhudy's personal feminist beliefs, times playing in bands, experiences as an undergraduate student, politics, and sexism towards women in the music industry. She produced the album at Rubber Room Studio in Chapel Hill, North Carolina.

In 2018, Rhudy performed at the Shakori Hills Grassroots Festival and contributed vocal tracks to the Bombadil album Beautiful Country.

In December 2019, Rhudy released the single Dance It Away, the first piece of music produced since her album in 2017. The single was produced by Jack Hallenbeck in Los Angeles and Raleigh.

In January 2020, Rhudy joined Mandolin Orange on their tour. She had previously performed as an opening act for the duo in 2017. Rhudy has also performed with Mipso.

In April 2022, Rhudy self-released her sophomore album, Dream Rooms.

Rhudy has cited The Dixie Chicks, Nickel Creek, and Alison Krauss, as well as Appalachian music, as influences on her music.

== Discography ==
=== Albums ===
- Rock 'N Roll Ain't For Me (2017)
- Dream Rooms (2022)

=== Singles ===
- Dance It Away (2020)
