= Mary Lambeth Moore =

American writer

- Born: 1958 (age 67–68); Reidsville, North Carolina, U.S.
- Education: UNC Chapel Hill; Harvard University (MPP)
- Occupations: writer, podcaster
- Known for: Sleeping With Patty Hearst
- Spouse: Bill Gowan
- Children: 1

Mary Lambeth Moore (born 1958) is an American novelist and podcaster. In 2010, she wrote the book Sleeping With Patty Hearst. In 2024, she founded the podcast Recovering Debs.

== Early life and education ==
Moore was born in 1958 in Reidsville, North Carolina. She grew up in Reidsville and was raised Methodist. In 1977, she was presented to society as a debutante at the North Carolina Debutante Ball.

She graduated from the University of North Carolina at Chapel Hill, where she was a member of Phi Beta Kappa, in 1980. Moore earned a master's degree in public policy from Harvard Kennedy School.

== Career ==
Moore works as a senior writer for the Center for Community Self-Help in Durham, North Carolina. She previously worked as the fiction editor for Carolina Wren Press. She has written short stories for Broad River Review.

She authored the book Sleeping with Patty Hearst in 2010.

In July 2024, Moore created the podcast Recovering Debs, interviewing other debutantes from North Carolina about their experiences and exploring the economic, social, and racial historic ties to debutante balls in the Southern United States.

== Personal life ==
Moore is married to Bill Gowan and has a son, Max Gowan. She lives in Raleigh, North Carolina.

She is Baptist and a member of Pullen Memorial Baptist Church. She was baptized on March 31, 2024.
