= Andrew Britton =

American novelist

- Born: Andrew Paul Britton; January 6, 1981; Peterborough, England
- Died: March 18, 2008 (aged 27); Durham, North Carolina, U.S.
- Education: Leesville Road High School; University of North Carolina at Chapel Hill
- Occupation: Novelist
- Writing career
- Genre: Spy fiction

Andrew Paul Britton (January 6, 1981 – March 18, 2008) was a British-born spy novelist who immigrated to the United States with his family at age seven. He published his first novel at age 23, his books were translated for international sales, and have been posted on the extended The New York Times Best Seller list.

== Early life ==
Britton was born in Peterborough (England, UK), in 1981. During his early childhood, he lived between Peterborough and Camlough (Northern Ireland, UK). Camlough is the birthplace of Britton's mother Anne to whom he dedicated his first book "The American." The family emigrated to the United States in 1988. Britton spent years in both Grand Rapids, Michigan, and Raleigh, North Carolina. After graduating from Leesville Road High School in Raleigh in 1999, Britton joined the U.S. Army as a combat engineer. He stayed in the Army for three years and served in Korea. After his military service, Britton attended the University of North Carolina at Chapel Hill, where he studied economics and psychology.

== Writing career ==
Britton made a publishing deal for his first book The American when he was 22. He followed this with his novel The Assassin, which was an immediate hit and was added to The New York Times best sellers list. In early 2007 Britton returned to Camlough, Northern Ireland to complete the third novel of the Ryan Kealey espionage series, The Invisible, and dedicated it to his "Camlough" maternal grandmother Eunice Britton. Britton's books appeared on The New York Times bestseller list and were translated into several languages becoming bestsellers worldwide. Britton died suddenly in March 2008. An avid researcher and writer, he left behind many manuscripts and his work will continue to be published.

- The American (2007)
- The Assassin (2008)
- The Invisible (2009)
- The Exile (2010)
- The Operative (2012)
- The Courier (2013)
- Threatcon Delta (2014)

== Death ==
On March 18, 2008, Britton died at the age of 27 of an undiagnosed heart condition in Durham, North Carolina. He was survived by his mother Annie (Britton) Nice, his stepfather Graham Nice, and his two siblings Christopher E. Britton and sister Roxanne S. Nice.

On June 14, 2010, after a two-year battle with grief and depression at the loss of his brother Andrew, Christopher, age 26 years old, took his own life. Half of Christopher's ashes were placed alongside Andrew in Memorial Gardens, US Army Section, Raleigh NC.

The remainder of both boys' ashes were brought back to the village of Camlough, County Armagh, Northern Ireland. Britton's mother could not part with them and has since brought the ashes of both boys back to her home in Raleigh, North Carolina. The boys' names have been added to the headstone of their paternal grandparents in St Malachy's graveyard in Carrickcruppen, Ireland.

Andrew and his brother Christopher Britton are interred in the veterans' section of Memorial Gardens Cemetery in Raleigh, North Carolina. An Irish Christmas Ceili is held in their Memory on the second Sunday of December every year at Tir na nOg Irish Pub in Raleigh. Toys and clothes are donated to local children in need as part of the event.
