= LA Lloyd =

American radio personality

LA Lloyd (born Lloyd Max Hocutt, Jr in Raleigh, North Carolina, United States), is a nationally syndicated radio host for the LA Lloyd Rock 30 and a former program director for the San Antonio rock station, KISS-FM. He was named program director for the Austin, Texas, 93.7 KLBJ-FM December 7, 2012. Lloyd began his radio career at WKZQ-FM in Myrtle Beach, South Carolina, in 1984 after graduating from Western Carolina University with a Bachelor of Arts in radio/TV/film.

== Rock 30 ==
Hocutt is the host of a nationally syndicated radio program called the LA Lloyd Rock 30. The weekly show is a three-hour countdown of modern rock music hits. Each week, the show is co-hosted by a different rock act, which is generally either an up-and-coming band or an artist who is topping the charts. The show began on July 4, 2000, with Kid Rock as its first co-host.

=== Affiliates ===
(Times based on station's local time zone)

Radio station	City	Hours
KEYJ FM (107.9)	Abilene, Texas	Sun 12 pm-3 pm
KLBJ FM (93.7)	Austin, Texas	Sat 9 pm-12 mid
WCPR FM (97.9)	Biloxi/Gulfport, Mississippi	Sun 9 am-12 n
WBRS (Internet)	Brussels, Belgium	Fri 5 pm-8 pm
KTED FM (100.5)	Casper, Wyoming	Sun 12 pm-3 pm
KDHK-FM (100.5)	Cedar Rapids/Decorah, Iowa	Sat 6 pm-9 pm/Sun 12n-3 pm
WCMI-FM (92.7)	Charleston/Huntington, West Virginia	Sun 4 pm-7 pm
WYRO-FM (98.7)	Charleston/Huntington, West Virginia	Sun 9 pm-12 mid
KNCN FM (101.3)	Corpus Christi, Texas	Sun 7 am-10 am
KSHP-DB (Rock 101)	Dakota Dunes, South Dakota	Sun 10 am-1 pm
KGRR (97.3)	Dubuque/Cedar Rapids, Iowa	Sat 2 pm-5 pm/Sun 5 pm-8 pm
WNGS-FM	Elmira, New York	Sat 9 am-12 n
KXLR-FM (95.9)	Fairbanks, Arkansas	Sat 4 pm-7 pm
WTCX-FM (95.1, 96.1)	Fon du Lac/Appleton, Wisconsin	Sun 5 pm-8 pm
KRGI-FM (99.7)	Grand Island/Lincoln, Nevada	Sat 7 am-10 am/Sun 3 pm-6 pm
KMZK FM (106.9)	Grand Junction, Colorado	Sat 7 am-10 am
WGLI-FM (98.7)	Hancock, Michigan	Sat 6pm-9pm
WFRD-FM (99.3)	Hanover-Lebanon, New Hampshire	Sun 7 am-10 am
KEJL-FM (100.5)	Hobbs/Albuquerque, New Mexico	Sun 1 pm-4 pm
WQFX-FM	Jamestown/Erie, Pennsylvania	Sat 9 pm-12 mid
WVLZ-FM (106.1)	Knoxville, TN	Sun 12 pm-3 pm
KZCD FM (94.1)	Lawton, Oklahoma	Sun 12 n-3 pm
WWZB-FM (95.1)	Manchester/Lexington, Kentucky	Sun 6 pm-9 pm
KROG FM (96.9)	Medford-Ashland, Oregon	Sun 12 pm-3 pm
KBRE-FM (105.7)	Merced/Fresno, California	Sat 7 pm-10 pm
KXRR FM (106.1)	Monroe, Louisiana	Sun 6:30 pm-9:30 pm
WXME-FM (98.3)	Monticello, Maine	Sat 12 pm-3 pm
KMCS-FM (93.1)	Muscatine/Davenport, Iowa	Sun 6 pm-9 pm
KRNP-FM (100.7)	North Platte, Nevada	Sat 8 pm-11 pm/Sun 3 pm-6 pm
WYYX FM (97.7)	Panama City, Florida	Sun 5 pm-8 pm
WIXO FM (105.7)	Peoria, Illinois	Sun 12 pm-3 pm
KBSZ-FM (97.3)	Phoenix, Arizona	Sat 10 pm-1 am
KFCW (93.1)	Riverton, Wyoming	Sat 3 pm-6 pm
KNRZ FM (96.5)	San Angelo, Texas	Sun 12n-3pm
KTPO-FM (106.7)	Sandpoint, Idaho	Sun 6pm-9pm
WFXH FM (106.1)	Savannah, Georgia	Sun 9am-12n
ISLAND 92	Simpson Bay, St. Maarten	Sat 7 pm-10 pm
WQCK-FM (105.9)	State College/Johnstown, Pennsylvania	Sun 10 pm-1 am
RockXRadio (Internet)	Stoney Creek, Ontario, Canada	Sat 9 am-12n/Wed 7 pm-10 pm
WNRM (Internet)	Tampa-St Petersburg, Florida	Fri 6 pm-9 pm/Sun 6 pm-9 pm
WRZK-FM (95.9)	Tri-Cities, TN/VA	Sun 7 pm-10 pm
WWBZ-FM (102.5)	Tri-Cities, Tennessee/Virginia	Sun 6 pm-9 pm
KFMA FM (102.1)	Tucson, Arizona	Sun 8 pm-11 pm
KMOD FM (97.5)	Tulsa, Oklahoma	Sun 9 am-12 n
KBZS FM (106.3)	Wichita Falls, Texas	Sat 12 pm-3 pm
KWDQ FM (102.3)	Woodward, Oklahoma	Fri 3 pm-6 pm
