= 2024 Raleigh mayoral election =

- November 5, 2024
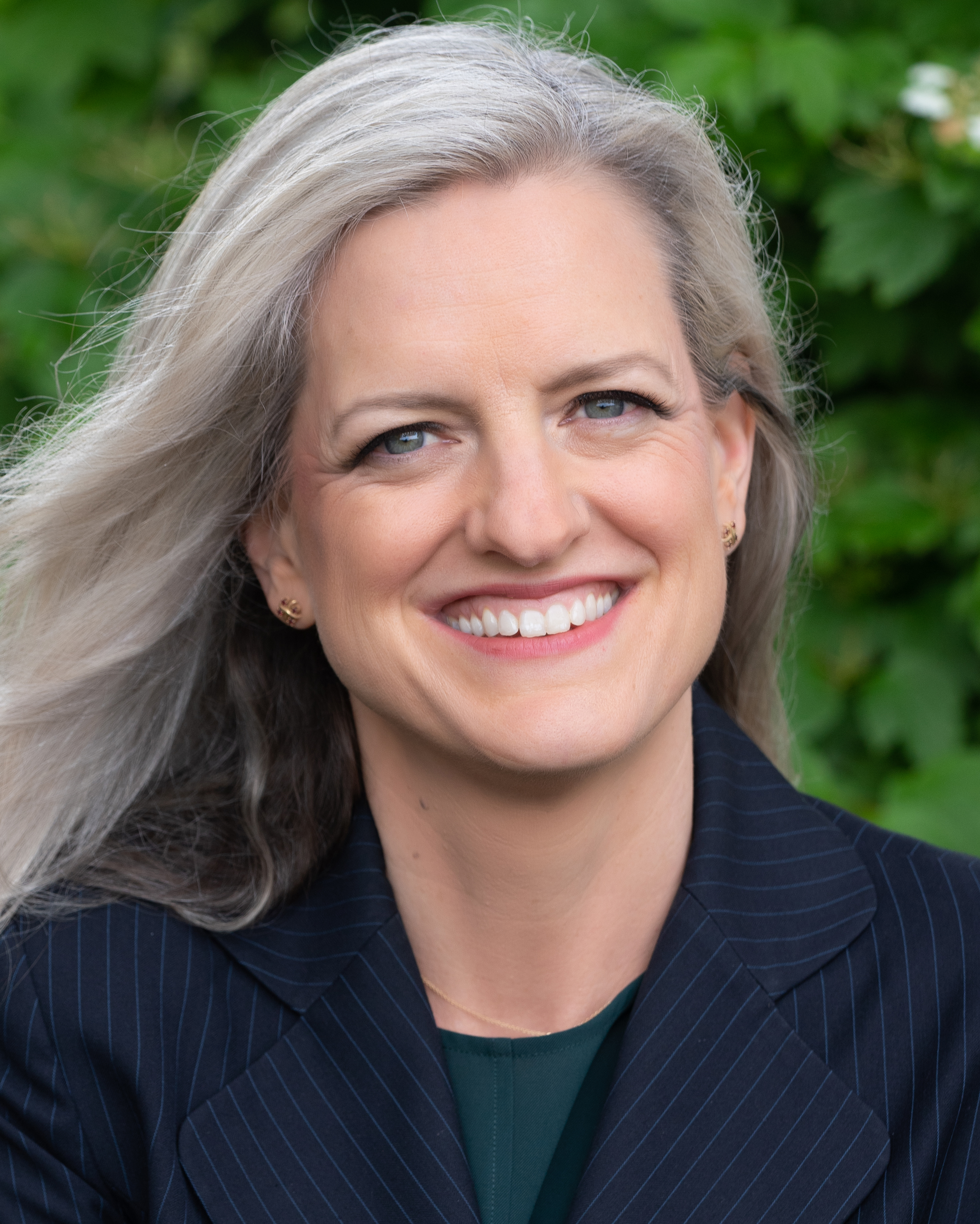

Candidate	Janet Cowell	Paul Fitts
Party	Nonpartisan	Nonpartisan
Alliance	Democratic	Republican
Popular vote	132,315	40,688
Percentage	59.78%	18.39%
Candidate	Terrance Ruth	Eugene Myrick
Party	Nonpartisan	Nonpartisan
Alliance	Democratic	Democratic
Popular vote	25,355	14,359
Percentage	11.34%	6.43%
- Results by precinct Cowell: 30–40% 40–50% 50–60% 60–70% 70–80% Fitts: 40–50% No Votes
Mayor before election
Mary-Ann Baldwin
Democratic
Elected mayor
Janet Cowell
Democratic

The 2024 Raleigh mayoral election was held on November 5, 2024 to elect the next mayor of Raleigh, North Carolina. Municipal elections in Raleigh are officially nonpartisan and use the plurality vote system, with no possibility of a runoff.

Incumbent mayor Mary-Ann Baldwin chose to retire rather than seek re-election to a third term in office. Former state treasurer Janet Cowell was elected mayor with 59.78 percent of the vote.

== Candidates ==
=== Declared ===
- Janet Cowell, former North Carolina State Treasurer (2009–2017) (Party affiliation: Democratic)
- Paul Fitts, mortgage broker and candidate for mayor in 2017 (Party affiliation: Republican)
- Eugene Myrick, radio producer
- Terrance Ruth, nonprofit executive and candidate for mayor in 2022
- James Shaughnessy IV, pre-law student at William Peace University

=== Withdrawn ===
- Corey Branch, city councilor (Party affiliation: Democratic) (ran for re-election)

=== Declined ===
- Mary-Ann Baldwin, incumbent mayor (2019–2024) (Party affiliation: Democratic)

== Endorsements ==
Janet Cowell

Local officials

- Nancy McFarlane, former mayor of Raleigh (2011–2019)
- Charles Meeker, former mayor of Raleigh (2001–2011)

Party chapters

- Wake County Democratic Party

Labor unions

- AFL-CIO North Carolina
- Police Benevolent Association North Carolina
- International Association of Fire Fighters Local 548

Organizations

- Equality North Carolina
- Sierra Club North Carolina
- The NewDEAL
- Muslim American Public Affairs Council

Newspapers

- The News & Observer
- Indy Week
Terrence Ruth

Organizations

- Run for Something

== Results ==
2024 Raleigh mayoral election
Candidate	Votes	%
Janet Cowell	132,315	59.78%
Paul Fitts	40,688	18.39%
Terrance Ruth	25,355	11.34%
Eugene Myrick	14,359	6.43%
James Shaughnessy IV	8,038	3.59%
Write-in	1,045	0.47%
Total votes	221,800	100.00%

== See also ==
- 2024 North Carolina elections
