= 2019 Raleigh mayoral election =

- October 8, 2019
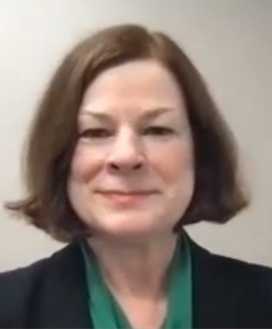

| Candidate | Mary-Ann Baldwin | Charles Francis |
| Party | Nonpartisan | Nonpartisan |
| Popular vote | 20,755 | 16,910 |
| Percentage | 38.23% | 31.15% |
| Candidate | Caroline Sullivan | Zainab Baloch |
| Party | Nonpartisan | Nonpartisan |
| Popular vote | 11,121 | 3,501 |
| Percentage | 20.49% | 6.45% |
Mayor before election
Nancy McFarlane
Independent
Elected mayor
Mary-Ann Baldwin
Democratic

The 2019 mayoral election in the city of Raleigh, North Carolina, was held on Tuesday, October 8, 2019. Former City Council member Mary-Ann Baldwin placed first in the election, followed by attorney Charles Francis. Although Baldwin did not receive a majority of the vote, Francis declined to seek a runoff, leaving Baldwin elected as the city's next mayor.

Incumbent Mayor Nancy McFarlane, first elected for a two-year term in 2011 and re-elected in 2013, 2015, and 2017, was eligible to seek re-election, but announced that she would not seek a fifth term.

== Candidates ==
=== Declared ===
- Mary-Ann Baldwin, former member of the Raleigh City Council
- Zainab Baloch, community activist and candidate for City Council in 2017
- Charles Francis, attorney and candidate for Mayor in 2017
- George Knott, musician
- Caroline Sullivan, former Wake County commissioner
- Justin L. Sutton, attorney

=== Declined ===
- Nancy McFarlane, Mayor of Raleigh since 2011

== Endorsements ==
Mary-Ann Baldwin

Newspapers

- Indy Week
Caroline Sullivan

Local Officials

- Nancy McFarlane, Mayor of Raleigh (2011–2019)

== First round results ==
2019 Raleigh mayoral election
| Party | Candidate | Votes | % | ±% |
|---|---|---|---|---|
| Non-partisan (Note: Baldwin is registered as a Democrat.) | Mary-Ann Baldwin | 20,755 | 38.23% | |
| Non-partisan (Note: Francis is registered as a Democrat.) | Charles Francis | 16,910 | 31.15% | |
| Non-partisan (Note: Sullivan is registered as a Democrat.) | Caroline Sullivan | 11,121 | 20.49% | |
| Non-partisan (Note: Baloch is registered as a Democrat.) | Zainab Baloch | 3,501 | 6.45% | |
| Non-partisan (Note: Sutton is registered Unaffiliated.) | Justin L. Sutton | 1,121 | 2.07% | |
| Non-partisan (Note: Knott is registered as a Democrat.) | George Knott | 737 | 1.36% | |
| Other | Write-ins | 140 | 0.26% | |
| Turnout | | 54,285 | | |
