= Elizabeth Ward =

Elizabeth Ward may refer to:

== Actresses ==
- Elizabeth Gracen (born 1961), American actress, born Elizabeth Ward, Miss America 1982
- Elizabeth Ward, American actress in Alone in the Dark
- B. J. Ward (actress) (Betty Jean Ward, born 1944), actress
- Beth Ward, presenter of quiz show As Schools Match Wits since 2008

== Others ==
- Elizabeth Ward (British campaigner) (1926–2020), British healthcare campaigner, founder of the British Kidney Patient Association and organ donor card pioneer
- Elizabeth Rebecca Ward (1880–1978), English writer
- Elizabeth Stuart Phelps Ward (1844–1911), American author
- Elizabeth Ward (critic), winner of National Book Critics Circle Award in 1992
- Elizabeth M. Ward, American scientist and researcher
- Liz Ward (artist), American artist
- Elizabeth Jane Ward (1842–1908), Australian evangelist and women's suffrage campaigner
- Bess Ward, American oceanographer, biogeochemist and microbiologist
- Betty Lou Ward (1936–2023), American politician in North Carolina
