= 2022 Raleigh mayoral election =

- November 8, 2022
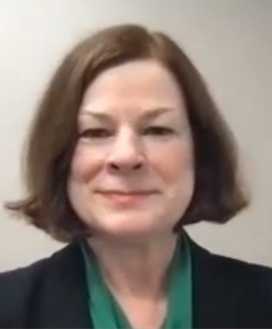

Candidate	Mary-Ann Baldwin	Terrance Ruth	DaQuanta Copeland
Party	Nonpartisan	Nonpartisan	Nonpartisan
Popular vote	71,936	62,498	15,730
Percentage	46.68%	40.55%	10.21%
- Precinct results Baldwin: 40–50% 50–60% 60–70% 80–90% Ruth: 30–40% 40–50% 50–60% 60–70% No votes
Mayor before election
Mary-Ann Baldwin
Democratic
Elected mayor
Mary-Ann Baldwin
Democratic

The 2022 mayoral election in the city of Raleigh, North Carolina, was originally scheduled to be held on Tuesday, October 5, 2021, but was postponed until November 8, 2022, by the passage of a state law in June 2021 that permanently moved Raleigh municipal elections to even years. The law also changed the requirement that winners attain a majority of the vote in a runoff if necessary, instead allowing election by a simple plurality. Incumbent mayor Mary-Ann Baldwin sought election to a second term in office. She was challenged by Terrance Ruth and DaQuanta Copeland.

Baldwin succeeded in her bid for re-election, receiving 46.7% of the vote. Ruth finished in second with 40.6% and Copeland finished third with 10.1%.

== Background ==
Incumbent mayor Mary-Ann Baldwin was first elected to the position of City of Raleigh mayor in 2019 on a platform of affordable housing. The city council passed an $80 million bond to fund the construction of affordable housing via ballot initiative in November 2020, though a similar proposal to fund the construction of public parks was abandoned due to the complications of the COVID-19 pandemic. Baldwin has faced criticism over being developer-friendly and for her perceived mishandling of Black Lives Matter protests in the summer of 2020, as well as the council's decision to ask the state legislature to move the election from odd-numbered to even-numbered years without public comment.

Challenger Terrance Ruth announced his candidacy in January 2021, running on a platform of restoring public transparency, promoting engagement, and increasing affordability and equitability. He has served as a Wake County principal, a non-profit director, and is currently a professor of public policy at North Carolina State University. He received the endorsement of the Wake County Democratic Party in July 2022. He also has been endorsed by Livable Raleigh, an organization which opposes Baldwin and the city council's changes to zoning.

== General election ==
=== Candidates ===
Filing for mayoral candidates began at noon on July 1 and ended at noon on July 15. Although the election was officially nonpartisan, all three candidates were members of the Democratic Party.

==== Declared ====
- Mary-Ann Baldwin, incumbent mayor (2019–present)
- DaQuanta Copeland, vice chair of the Wake County Health and Human Services Board
- Terrance Ruth, nonprofit executive director and professor at North Carolina State University

==== Declined ====
- Zainab Baloch, community activist, candidate for the Raleigh city council in 2017, and candidate for mayor in 2019 (running for city council district B)
- Corey Branch, city councilor (running for re-election)
- Patrick Buffkin, city councilor
- David Cox, city councilor
- Kay Crowder, former city councilor
- Ryan Dexheimer, Student at NC State University
- Stormie Forte, city councilor (running for at-large seat on city council)
- Charles Francis, attorney and candidate for mayor in 2017 and 2019
- David Knight, city councilor (running for re-election)
- George Knott, musician and candidate for mayor in 2019
- Jonathan Melton, city councilor (running for re-election)
- Stef Mendell, former city councilor
- Russ Stephenson, former city councilor
- Nicole Stewart, Raleigh mayor pro-temp
- Caroline Sullivan, former Wake County commissioner and candidate for mayor in 2019
- Justin Sutton, attorney and candidate for mayor in 2019

=== Endorsements ===
Mary-Ann Baldwin

Newspapers

- The News & Observer
Terrance Ruth

Organizations

- Livable Raleigh
- Wake County Democratic Party

=== Results ===
Official results
Party	Candidate	Votes	%
Nonpartisan	Mary-Ann Baldwin (incumbent)	71,936	46.68%
Nonpartisan	Terrance Ruth	62,498	40.55%
Nonpartisan	DaQuanta Copeland	15,730	10.21%
Write-in		3,947	9.48%
Total votes		154,111	100%
