= Saige Martin =

American artist, politician (active 2012– )

Raleigh City Councilman
- In office October 2019 – June 26, 2020
- Preceded by: Kay Crowder
- Succeeded by: Stormie Forte

Personal details
- Born: Bucks County, Pennsylvania, U.S.
- Party: Democratic
- Education: Pennridge High School
- Alma mater: Hawaii Pacific University (BA); North Carolina State University (MA)
- Occupation: Artist, fund director

Saige Martin is an American artist, fund director, and former politician. A Democrat, Martin was one of the first openly gay people, the first Latinx person, and the youngest person ever to sit on the Raleigh City Council. He served from 2019 until 2020, when he resigned due to allegations that he had sexually assaulted several men.

== Early life and career ==
Martin was born in foster care to fifteen-year old parents. He is of Puerto Rican descent on his father's side. He was adopted and grew up in Bucks County, Pennsylvania after his mother was forced out of her foster home. He graduated from Pennridge High School.

Martin has a bachelor of arts degree in Cultural Anthropology from Hawaii Pacific University, where he served as student body president. In this role, he worked with the city of Honolulu, the county, and the governor's office on multiple issues affecting students at the university. He also has graduate degree in Art and Design from North Carolina State University.

While a graduate student, Martin spent a winter break volunteering with a non-profit organization at the Mexico–United States border. In March 2019 he presented a multimedia performance at the CRDM Symposium. He worked with the United Nations in Turkey while studying for a semester at Koç University, aiding Syrian refugees fleeing from the Syrian Civil War, and as part of the United Nations Millennium Campaign in New York City. He traveled to fifteen countries on behalf of the United Nations to partake in the U.N. My World Global Survey. He worked on President Barack Obama's 2012 presidential campaign in southern Philadelphia, and was a communications consultant for Secretary of State Hillary Clinton's 2016 presidential campaign.

Martin has worked as a fund director, helping pilot new funding models for non-profit organizations. He has served on the boards of The Hope Center at Pullen, the Justice-Love Foundation, and LEAD NC.

== Political career ==
In March 2019, Martin announced his campaign for Raleigh City Council, against sitting councilwoman Kay Crowder for District D in Southwest Raleigh. Martin, who is openly gay and Latinx, ran with a progressive platform focusing on affordable housing, environmental reforms, establishing a Police Accountability Review Board, and revitalizing the council. He was endorsed by Indy Week, Equality NC, Ashley Christensen, and North Carolina Museum of Art director Larry Wheeler. On June 25, 2019 Martin spoke publicly, as a candidate for city council, on the importance of the Stonewall Riots.

He was elected in October 2019 as the first Latinx person and, alongside Councilman Jonathan Melton, who was also elected in 2019, one of the first two openly gay men to sit on the city council. Twenty-eight years old at the time of assuming office, Martin is the youngest person to serve on the Raleigh City Council.

As a member of the city council, Martin spearheaded its backroom deal to cancel citizen advisory councils, and was a vocal advocate for defunding the Raleigh Police Department. Martin and Raleigh mayor Mary-Ann Baldwin voted in secrecy on removing the city's nineteen citizen advisory councils, which were formed in 1974. The only councilman to be left out of the secret vote was David Cox, who opposed the measure.

In April 2020, Martin, alongside Durham mayor Steve Schewel; Durham County Board of Commissioners Chairwoman Wendy Jacobs; Durham County Commissioner Heidi Carter; Durham City Council members Javiera Caballero, Jillian Johnson, Mark-Anthony Middleton, and Charlie Reece; and Raleigh City Council member Nicole Stewart, pledged to take part in the #ShareYourCheck Challenge. They pledged all or part of their federal stimulus payments, part of an aid package to help Americans through the COVID-19 recession onset by the COVID-19 pandemic, to go to Siembra Solidarity Fund. The fund helps undocumented residents who have been shut out of financial assistance due to their immigration status.

In June 2020, Martin defended protesters who were arrested, and victims of police brutality, during the George Floyd Protests in Raleigh, stating in a Twitter post, "Let's get one thing straight: we DO NOT arrest peaceful protesters in the City of Raleigh. Both individuals detained this evening are black. Both are queer. One is a minor. This conduct is disgusting". Martin later tweeted that he would be presenting a plan to the city council to defund and reallocate police funds, "to truly focus on the safety, wellbeing, and health of our black community."

=== Sexual assault allegations ===
Martin resigned from the city council on June 26, 2020 after allegations of sexual misconduct were made against him by four male students at North Carolina State University. His resignation was accepted by Mayor Mary-Ann Baldwin. The students alleged in The News & Observer that Martin, while working as a graduate teaching assistant in 2018 and 2019, had sexually assaulted them or behaved inappropriately. One of the accusers was seventeen years old at the time of the alleged assault. Martin denied the allegations.

Wake County District Attorney Lorrin Freeman asked the North Carolina State Bureau of Investigation to look into the accusations against Martin. In July 2020 Freeman announced that charges would not be pressed against Martin due to a lack of sufficient evidence. Juni Cuevas, the only accuser who agreed to be publicly identified, maintained he did not want to pursue a criminal case.

Martin's vacant seat was filled by Stormie Forte on July 14, 2020.
