= Stormie Forte =

American lawyer and politician

Mayor Pro Tempore of Raleigh, North Carolina
- Incumbent
- Assumed office 2024
- Preceded by: Corey Branch

Raleigh City Councilwoman
- Incumbent
- Assumed office July 14, 2020
- Preceded by: Saige Martin

Personal details
- Born: Stormie Denise Forte Raleigh, North Carolina, U.S.
- Party: Democratic
- Education: Needham B. Broughton High School
- Alma mater: University of North Carolina at Chapel Hill (BA, MS); North Carolina Central University (JD)
- Occupation: lawyer, radio host

Stormie Denise Forte is an American lawyer, radio host, and politician. She is the first African-American woman to serve on the Raleigh City Council. She was appointed to the council on July 14, 2020 and represents District D, which encompasses Southwest Raleigh. On July 8, 2022, Stormie filed to run for Raleigh's at-large district in the 2022 Raleigh election.

== Biography ==
Forte is a native of Raleigh, North Carolina. She graduated from Needham B. Broughton High School in 1989. She has a bachelor of arts degree in sociology and a master of science degree in rehabilitation counseling and psychology from the University of North Carolina at Chapel Hill. Forte is a member of Delta Sigma Theta. She graduated from North Carolina Central University School of Law in 2002.

Forte was appointed to the Raleigh City Council on July 14, 2020, making her the first African-American woman to serve on the council. She is also the first openly LGBTQ woman, and third openly LGBTQ person after Saige Martin and Jonathan Melton, to serve on the council. She is the Representative of Raleigh's District D, which includes North Carolina State University, Glenwood South, and Dix Hill. Forte filled a vacant seat on the council, which had belonged to Martin. Martin resigned from the council due to sexual assault allegations. Forte was elected by members of the city council, and by Mayor Mary-Ann Baldwin, out of fifty-four candidates. She received 6 out of the 7 votes. She ran with a platform to create access to more affordable housing, address concerns related to tensions between citizens and the Raleigh Police Department, and to create more economic development opportunities for local minority-owned small businesses. On being appointed, Forte stated: “I can honestly say I am a little emotional thinking of the historical impact of being selected. Being Black and being female and being a person within the LGBTQ community — all those things make up the person I am.”

Forte is a lawyer. She works at Obsidian Consulting Services, where she works with local companies and business organizations. She is also a volunteer with the Raleigh City of Oaks Marathon, Hopscotch Music Festival, Rex Hospital Open, and the African American Cultural Festival of Raleigh and Wake County. She is also a member of the Raleigh Wake Citizens Association and the Wake County Voter Education Coalition. She serves on the North Carolina Science Museum Friends Advisory Board, the Clarence Y Lightner Achiever's Advisory Board, the North Carolina Commission for Racial and Ethnic Disparities, and the North Carolina Independent Colleges and University Ethics Bowl Advisory Committee.

Forte also hosts a weekly radio show, called The Art of Listening, on Choice FM 92.1.
