= 1999 Raleigh mayoral election =

Raleigh mayoral election, 1999
- November 5, 1999

Candidate	Paul Coble	Stephanie Fanjul
Party	Republican	Democratic
Popular vote	23,700	23,437
Percentage	50.13%	49.57%
Mayor before election
Tom Fetzer
Republican
Elected mayor
Paul Coble
Republican

The Raleigh mayoral election of 1999 was held on November 5, 1999, to elect a Mayor of Raleigh, North Carolina. The election was non-partisan. It was won by Paul Coble, who replaced Tom Fetzer after beating Stepanie Fanjul.

== Results ==
1999 Raleigh mayoral election
Candidate	Votes	%
Paul Coble	23,700	50.13
Stepanie Fanjul	23,437	49.57
Write-ins	144	0.30
Turnout	47,281	%
