= Tony Gurley =

American lawyer & politician (born 1956)

Chair of the Wake County Board of Commissioners
- In office December 7, 2009 – December 6, 2010
- Preceded by: Harold Webb
- Succeeded by: Paul Coble
- In office December 5, 2005 – December 3, 2007
- Preceded by: Joe Bryan
- Succeeded by: Joe Bryan

Member of the Wake County Board of Commissioners from the 3rd District
- In office December 2, 2002 – February 28, 2014
- Preceded by: Betty Mangum
- Succeeded by: Rich Gianni

Personal details
- Born: April 3, 1956 (age 70) McDowell County, North Carolina, U.S.
- Party: Republican
- Spouse: Robin Gurley
- Education: University of North Carolina at Chapel Hill

Tony Gurley (born April 3, 1956) is an American businessman and political figure from North Carolina, currently serving as chief operating officer for the Office of State Budget and Management. He served on the Wake County Board of Commissioners from his election in 2002 until he resigned in 2014 to take the state position. Gurley served as vice-chairman of the board of commissioners in 2005 and as chairman in 2005–2007, and from 2009–2010.

By education, Gurley is both a pharmacist and attorney. He is a member of the North Carolina Republican Party. In 2011, Gurley filed paperwork to run for Lieutenant Governor of North Carolina in 2012, but was subsequently defeated by Dan Forest in the Republican primary.

== Early life, education and business career ==
Gurley was born and raised in McDowell County in Western North Carolina. After graduating from high school, Tony attended University of North Carolina and received his Bachelor of Science in Pharmacy in 1978. He continued his studies at UNC and in 1981 received his master's degree in Pharmacy Administration. In 1999, he entered Law School at North Carolina Central University. He received his J.D. degree in 2003. After law school, Gurley opened the Law practice of Gurley & Cookson in Raleigh, although he was not active in practicing law.

== Political career ==
=== Wake County Board of Commissioners ===
Gurley began his political career in Raleigh in 2002 when he was elected at-large to the Wake County Board of Commissioners. Gurley was re-elected in 2006, and 2010 respectively.

=== 2012 run for lieutenant governor ===
In March 2011, Gurley announced via Twitter that he filed organizational papers to run for Lieutenant Governor of North Carolina in 2012. In September 2011, Gurley's candidacy was endorsed by former Lieutenant Governor James Carson Gardner, stating that he liked the idea that Gurley, a pharmacy owner, had a background in business. Shortly thereafter, Gurley was also endorsed by Wake County Sheriff Donnie Harrison.

=== Electoral history ===
==== 2012 ====
North Carolina lieutenant gubernatorial Republican primary election, 2012
Party	Candidate	Votes	%
Republican	Dan Forest	253,656	32.98%
Republican	Tony Gurley	190,980	24.83%
Republican	Dale Folwell	186,564	24.25%
Republican	Grey Mills	112,824	14.67%
Republican	Arthur Jason Rich	25,206	3.28%
Total votes		769,230	100%

Under state law, if no candidate receives 40 percent of the vote in the primary, the second-place candidate can request a second primary (runoff). Gurley declared that he would ask for such a runoff after finishing second in the unofficial May 8 primary election results. Gurley was defeated by Dan Forest on July 17.

North Carolina lieutenant gubernatorial Republican primary run-off election, 2012
Party	Candidate	Votes	%
Republican	Dan Forest	101,961	67.87%
Republican	Tony Gurley	48,278	32.13%
Total votes		150,239	100%

==== 2010 ====
Wake County Board of Commissioners 3rd district general election, 2010
Party	Candidate	Votes	%
Republican	Tony Gurley (incumbent)	142,447	52.36%
Democratic	Steve Rao	129,597	47.64%
Total votes		272,044	100%
Republican hold			

==== 2006 ====
Wake County Board of Commissioners 3rd district Republican primary election, 2006
Party	Candidate	Votes	%
Republican	Tony Gurley (incumbent)	8,174	76.51%
Republican	Michael Luther	2,510	23.49%
Total votes		10,684	100%

Wake County Board of Commissioners 3rd district general election, 2006
Party	Candidate	Votes	%
Republican	Tony Gurley (incumbent)	102,768	52.67%
Democratic	Martha Brock	92,338	47.33%
Total votes		195,106	100%
Republican hold			

==== 2002 ====
Wake County Board of Commissioners 3rd district general election, 2002
Party	Candidate	Votes	%
Republican	Tony Gurley	105,549	49.08%
Democratic	Betty Mangum (incumbent)	102,869	47.88%
Libertarian	Ryan Maas	6,538	3.04%
Total votes		214,956	100%
Republican gain from Democratic			
