= 2021 Durham mayoral election =

- November 2, 2021
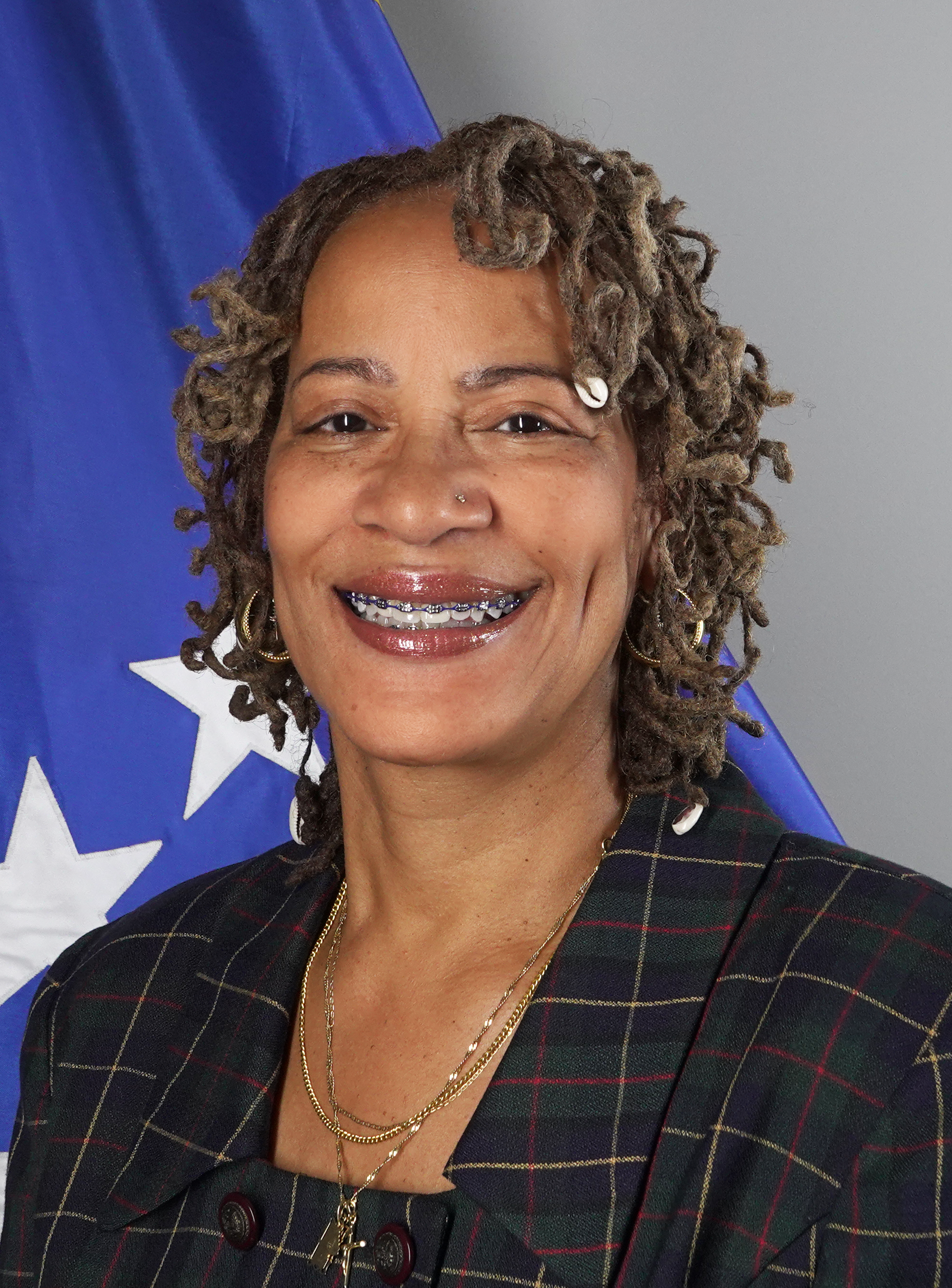

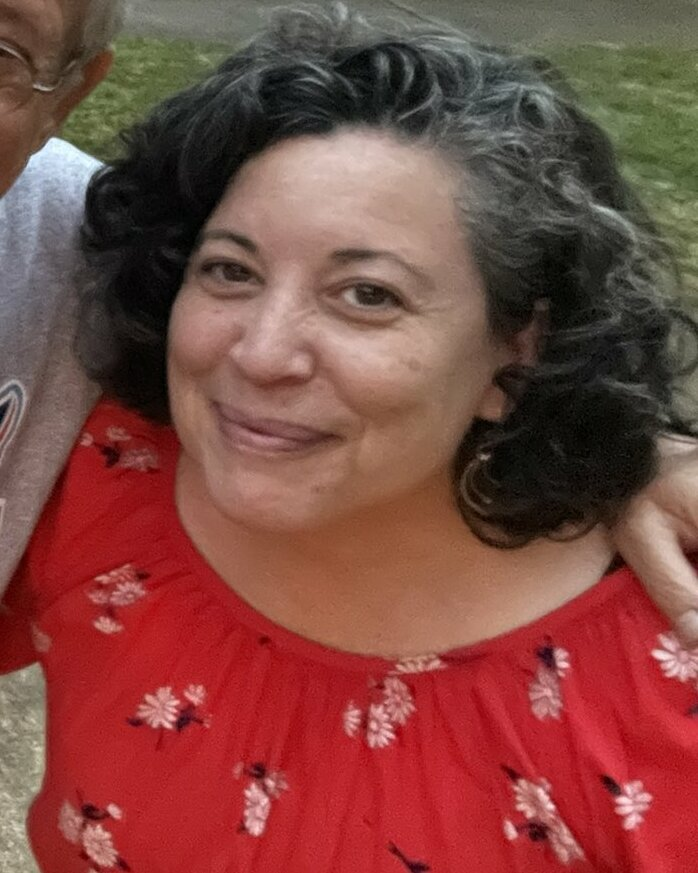
Candidate	Elaine O'Neal	Javiera Caballero
Popular vote	25,936	4,463
Percentage	84.6%	14.6%
Mayor before election
Steve Schewel
Elected mayor
Elaine O'Neal

The 2021 Durham, North Carolina mayoral election was held on November 2, 2021, to elect the next mayor of Durham, North Carolina.

Mayor Steve Schewel was elected with 59.5% of the vote in 2017, and was reelected with 83.4% in 2019. On May 27, 2021, he announced that he would not seek a third term. Seven candidates filed to run in this election to succeed Schewel as mayor.

Schewel endorsed city council member Javiera Caballero to be his successor. Durham's longest-serving mayor, Bill Bell, endorsed former superior court judge Elaine O'Neal. Caballero and O'Neal were considered the two frontrunners in the election.

A nonpartisan blanket primary was held on October 5, 2021. The top two candidates from the primary, Elaine O'Neal and Javiera Caballero, advanced to the general election ballot. O'Neal garnered 84.6% of the vote in the general election, thus becoming mayor.

== Candidates ==
=== Declared ===
- Rebecca Barnes
- Javiera Caballero, member of the Durham City Council since 2018
- Bree Davis, research coordinator at the University of North Carolina at Chapel Hill
- Jahnmaud Lane
- Elaine O'Neal, former superior court judge and former interim dean at the North Carolina Central University School of Law
- Daryl Quick

=== Withdrew ===
- Charlitta Burruss, advocate and candidate for city council in 2019 (remained on ballot)

=== Declined ===
- Steve Schewel, mayor since 2017

== Endorsements ==
Javiera Caballero

Local officials

- Jillian Johnson, mayor pro tempore of Durham (2017-2021)
- Steve Schewel, mayor of Durham (2017-2021)
Elaine O'Neal

Local officials

- Bill Bell, mayor of Durham (2001-2017)

Newspapers

- Indy Week

== Results ==
2021 Durham mayoral election results
Primary election
Party	Candidate	Votes	%
Nonpartisan	Elaine O'Neal	13,781	67.8
Nonpartisan	Javiera Caballero	5,023	24.7
Nonpartisan	Jahnmaud Lane	598	2.9
Nonpartisan	Rebecca Barnes	352	1.7
Nonpartisan	Bree Davis	231	1.1
Nonpartisan	Daryl Quick	216	1.1
Nonpartisan	Charlitta Burruss (withdrawn)	113	0.6
Total votes		20,314	100% (Note: The percentage of votes above don't add up to 100% due to rounding.)
General election
Nonpartisan	Elaine O'Neal	25,936	84.6
Nonpartisan	Javiera Caballero	4,463	14.6
Nonpartisan	Steve Schewel (write-in)	8	0.0
Write-in		235 (Note: Excluding Steve Schewel.)	0.8
Total votes		30,642	100%
