= 2009 Raleigh mayoral election =

- October 6, 2009

Candidate	Charles Meeker	Larry D. Hudson, II	Mark Enloe
Party	Democratic
Popular vote	17,565	8,071	1,907
Percentage	61.76%	28.38%	6.71%
Mayor before election
Charles Meeker
Democratic
Elected mayor
Charles Meeker
Democratic

The Raleigh mayoral election of 2009 was held on 6 October 2009 to elect a Mayor of Raleigh, North Carolina. It was won by incumbent Charles Meeker, who defeated Larry D. Hudson, II in the first-round primary. Because Meeker won more than 50% in the first round, there was no need for a run-off.

It was officially a non-partisan contest, but Meeker had won four previous elections as a Democrat.

== Results ==
2009 Raleigh mayoral election
Candidate	Votes	%
Charles Meeker (incumbent)	17,565	61.76
Larry D. Hudson, II	8,071	28.38
Mark Enloe	1,907	6.71
Gregg S. Kunz	783	2.75
Write-ins	115	0.40
Total votes	27,658	100
