= Paul Coble =

American politician from North Carolina (born 1953)

Chair of the Wake County Board of Commissioners
- In office 2010–2012
- Preceded by: Tony Gurley
- Succeeded by: Joe Bryan

Member of the Wake County Board of Commissioners from the 7th district
- In office 2006–2014
- Preceded by: Herb Council
- Succeeded by: John Burns

36th Mayor of Raleigh
- In office December 7, 1999 – December 2001
- Preceded by: Tom Fetzer
- Succeeded by: Charles Meeker

Personal details
- Born: Paul Yelverton Coble; October 19, 1953 (age 72) Raleigh, North Carolina, U.S.
- Party: Republican
- Spouse: Connie Kearney
- Education: Wake Forest University (BS)
- Website: Campaign website

Paul Yelverton Coble (born October 19, 1953, in Raleigh, North Carolina) served one term as Mayor of Raleigh, North Carolina from December 1999 to December 2001. Coble served on the Wake County Board of Commissioners from 2006 to 2014, and served as chairman of the board from 2010 to 2012. In 2015, he became the Legislative Services Officer for the North Carolina General Assembly.

== Early life ==
Coble is the son of Jack and Betsey Coble and the nephew of the late U.S. Senator Jesse Helms. He attended Needham B. Broughton High School, earned a Bachelor of Science degree at Wake Forest University in business. In 1992, he completed a Registered Health Underwriter designation through Northeastern University.

== Political career ==
Coble served on Raleigh City Council from 1993 to 1999. While on the council, he served as chairman of the budget committee and the planning committee. He also served as mayor pro tem. Councilman Coble worked to cut the tax rate four times. Like his predecessor, Mayor Tom Fetzer, he was a conservative Republican. He was sworn in as Mayor on December 7, 1999, after winning the 1999 Raleigh mayoral election. Coble served until 2001. During Coble's term as mayor, the city had to rapidly respond to a record 25-inch snow storm and opened the Progress Energy Center for the Performing Arts. Coble focused on public safety issues and promoted a program to prosecute gun violence under Federal laws.

Coble ran for reelection in 2001, facing Democrat Charles Meeker. On the first ballot, with a voter turnout of about 40,000 people, Coble received 49.15% of the votes while his opponent garnered 47.65%. In the subsequent run-off election voter turnout climbed to approximately 50,000 and Meeker defeated Coble, 50.97% to 48.87% of the votes. The following year, Coble ran unsuccessfully for a seat in the North Carolina State Senate against Democrat Eric Reeves. Reeves won with 49.29% of the votes to Coble's 48.38%.

In 2006, Coble sought a comeback to elective office by running for an open seat on the Wake County Board of Commissioners. He handily defeated Air Force veteran Rodger Koopman 54.42% to 45.58%. Coble served as chairman of the Public Safety Committee and serves on the Wake County Fire Commission. He was re-elected to the commission in 2010, defeating Wake County attorney and former Wake County Democratic Party chair Jack Nichols. Coble served as chairman of the commissioners for two terms, in 2011 and 2012. In 2014 he lost reelection to the commission to Raleigh attorney John D. Burns. He briefly served as a lobbyist before being hired as the North Carolina Legislative Services Officer in 2015.

In December 2008, Coble downplayed reports that he was considering running for Governor of North Carolina in the 2012 election, challenging Bev Perdue. Instead, he later announced that he would run for the U.S. House in North Carolina's 13th congressional district, then occupied by U.S. Representative Brad Miller.

=== 2012 Congressional Run ===
Coble, former U.S. Attorney George E.B. Holding, and 2010 nominee Bill Randall ran for the Republican nomination. Former Winston-Salem city council member Vernon Robinson and Nathan Tabor, who ran unsuccessfully in the 5th district in 2004, had both planned to seek the Republican nomination in the 13th district in 2012, but Robinson instead ran in the 8th district, while Tabor declined to run as a result of changes made to the district in redistricting. On May 8, George Holding won the Republican primary with almost 44 percent of the vote.

=== Electoral history ===
==== 2014 ====
Wake County Board of Commissioners 7th district general election, 2014
Party	Candidate	Votes	%
Democratic	John Burns	171,981	54.53%
Republican	Paul Coble (incumbent)	143,393	45.47%
Total votes		315,374	100%
Democratic gain from Republican			

==== 2012 ====
North Carolina's 13th congressional district Republican primary election, 2012
Party	Candidate	Votes	%
Republican	George Holding	37,341	43.51%
Republican	Paul Coble	29,354	34.21%
Republican	Bill Randall	19,119	22.28%
Total votes		85,814	100%

==== 2010 ====
Wake County Board of Commissioners 7th district general election, 2010
Party	Candidate	Votes	%
Republican	Paul Coble (incumbent)	141,687	51.99%
Democratic	Jack Nichols	130,841	48.01%
Total votes		272,528	100%
Republican hold			

==== 2006 ====
Wake County Board of Commissioners 7th district general election, 2006
Party	Candidate	Votes	%
Republican	Paul Coble	107,730	54.42%
Democratic	Rodger Koopman	90,232	45.58%
Total votes		197,962	100%
Republican hold			

==== 2002 ====
North Carolina Senate 16th district general election, 2002
Party	Candidate	Votes	%
Democratic	Eric Miller Reeves (incumbent)	25,799	49.29%
Republican	Paul Coble	25,323	48.38%
Libertarian	Jason Mara	1,215	2.32%
Total votes		52,337	100%
Democratic hold			

==== 2001 ====
2001 Raleigh mayoral election
Candidate	Votes	%
Paul Coble (incumbent)	19,279	49.15%
Charles Meeker	18,692	47.65%
Joel Cornette	767	1.96%
Write-in	489	1.25%
Total votes	39,227	100%

2001 Raleigh mayoral election run-off
Candidate	Votes	%
Charles Meeker	25,655	50.97%
Paul Coble (incumbent)	24,599	48.87%
Write-in	83	0.16%
Total votes	50,337	100%

==== 1999 ====
1999 Raleigh mayoral election
Candidate	Votes	%
Paul Coble	23,700	50.13%
Stepanie Fanjul	23,437	49.57%
Write-in	144	0.30%
Total votes	47,281	100%

Political offices
Preceded by Tom Fetzer	Mayor of Raleigh; 1999–2001	Succeeded by Charles Meeker
