= Greg Ford (North Carolina politician) =

American educator and politician from North Carolina

Chairman of the Wake County Board of Commissioners
- In office December 2, 2019 – December 7, 2020
- Preceded by: Jessica Holmes
- Succeeded by: Matt Calabria

Vice Chairman of the Wake County Board of Commissioners
- In office December 2, 2019 – December 7, 2020
- Preceded by: Jessica Holmes
- Succeeded by: Matt Calabria

Member of the Wake County Board of Commissioners from the 6th district
- In office December 5, 2016 – December 7, 2020
- Preceded by: Betty Lou Ward
- Succeeded by: Shinica Thomas

Personal details
- Party: Democratic
- Children: 3
- Occupation: Educator, Politician
- Website: gregford.com

Greg Ford is an American educator and politician. He served on the Wake County Board of Commissioners from 2016 to 2020 and was the first openly LGBTQ elected official in Wake County, North Carolina.

== Career ==
=== Education ===
Ford worked as a teacher and principal at elementary and middle schools in the Wake County Public School System.

=== Politics ===
Ford is a member of the Democratic Party and describes himself as a "progressive". He was elected to the Wake County Board of Commissioners in 2016, becoming the first openly LGBTQ person to hold elected office in Wake County. He served as chair of the commission. He ran for reelection in 2020 but later withdrew in order to move to California with his family.

In 2019, Ford and his 8-year-old daughter were the victim of glitter bomb prank, sent anonymously to their house via the website RuinDays.com. Inside the package was a note that said, "Glitter is the herpes of the craft world. Good luck getting rid of it like your bad decisions." The package was sent to the district attorney's office, but no investigation was opened.

==== Electoral history ====
===== 2018 =====
Wake County Board of Commissioners 6th district general election, 2018
Party	Candidate	Votes	%
Democratic	Greg Ford (incumbent)	262,240	61.58%
Republican	David Blackwelder	163,601	38.42%
Total votes		425,841	100%
Democratic hold			

===== 2016 =====
Wake County Board of Commissioners 6th district general election, 2016
Party	Candidate	Votes	%
Democratic	Greg Ford	277,142	56.17%
Republican	John Odom	216,272	43.83%
Total votes		493,414	100%
Democratic hold			

== Personal life ==
Ford's husband, Anthony Pugliese, served as chief operating officer for the American Institute of Certified Public Accountants and as the chair of the Chapel Hill-Carrboro Chamber of Commerce and the chair of the Durham Chamber of Commerce. Pugliese is currently president and CEO of the Institute of Internal Auditors. They have three children; Jonathan, Brooke, and Chloe.
