= Javiera Caballero =

American politician (born 1978)

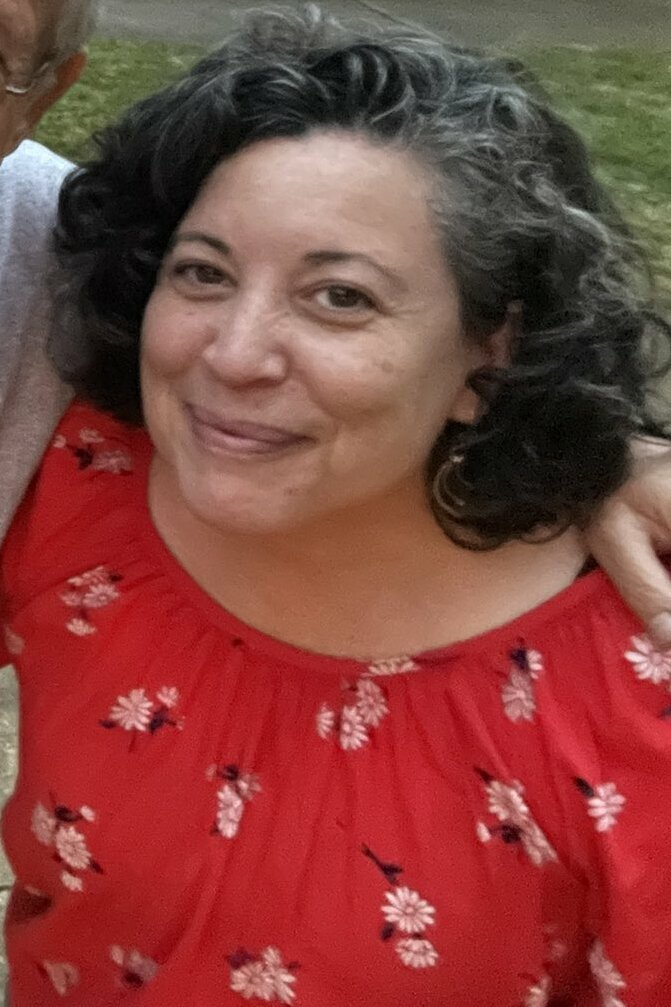
- Caballero in 2021

Mayor Pro Tempore of Durham, North Carolina
- Incumbent
- Assumed office 2025
- Mayor: Leonardo Williams
- Preceded by: Mark-Anthony Middleton

Durham City Councilor At-large
- Incumbent
- Assumed office January 16, 2018

Personal details
- Born: 1978 (age 47–48) Santiago, Chile
- Party: Democratic
- Education: Appalachian State University

Javiera Caballero (born 1978) is a Chilean-born American politician and former educator. She is the first Latina member of the Durham City Council, having been appointed to the council in 2018. In 2021, she had an unsuccessful campaign to run for Mayor of Durham, but lost to Elaine O'Neal. In 2025, she was appointed by Mayor Leonardo Williams as the mayor pro tempore, becoming the first Latina to serve in that office.

== Early life and education ==
Caballero was born in Santiago de Chile in 1978. When she was two years old, her family immigrated to the United States, where her father was completing a graduate school program, in order to escape the Chilean military dictatorship. They settled in Charlotte, North Carolina and lived in a neighborhood that suffered from gang violence.

Caballero graduated with a bachelor's degree in political science from Appalachian State University in 2000.

== Career ==
Caballero became certified in the Montessori method of education and taught in Montessori schools in both North Carolina and Illinois. In 2005, she moved to Durham, North Carolina. In Durham, Caballero helped fundraise and organize a cooperative bakery called Bread Uprising, where she also worked as a baker, that addressed food insecurity and gave low-income families access to sustainable food sources.

Caballero went back to working in education, as a consultant at the education consulting firm Cross & Joftus. She later worked a program coordinator for Alma Advisory Group.

=== Politics ===
Caballero is a Democrat. On January 16, 2018, she became the first Latina to be appointed as a member of the Durham City Council to fill the seat of former Councilman Steve Schewel after he was elected as Mayor of Durham. In her first public address after being sworn into office, she spoke in both English and Spanish. She was re-elected to the council in 2019, with a term set to end in 2023. Caballero was appointed by Mayor Steve Schewel to serve on the Community Safety and Wellness Task Force, the Durham Bicycle and Pedestrian Advisory Committee, the Durham Central Park Board, the Durham Open Space and Trails Commission, the Jount City-County Planning Committee, the Mayor's Latino and Hispanic Committee, the Triangle J. Council of Governments - Center of the Region Enterprise Committee, the Council Subcommittee on Housing, and the Community Involvement and Organizations Committee. She was also appointed by Schewel to serve as a voting member of the Durham-Chapel Hill-Carrboro Metropolitan Planning Organization Board, as Committee Co-Chair of Latino Outreach and a member of the School Improvement Team at Club Boulebard Elementary School, and as an alternate committee member of the Durham Crime Cabinet, the Environmental Affairs Board, the Triangle J. Council of Governments, and the Participatory Budgeting Steering Committee.

In April 2020 Caballero, alongside Durham mayor Steve Schewel, Durham County Board of Commissioners chairwoman Wendy Jacobs, Durham County Commissioner Heidi Carter, Durham City Council members Jillian Johnson, Mark-Anthony Middleton, and Charlie Reece, and Raleigh City Council members Saige Martin and Nicole Stewart, pledged to take part in the #ShareYourCheck Challenge. They pledged all or part of their federal stimulus payments, part of an aid package to help Americans through the COVID-19 recession onset by the COVID-19 pandemic, to go to Siembra Solidarity Fund. The fund helps undocumented residents who were shut out of financial assistance due to their immigration status.

In 2021, Caballero ran against fellow Democrat and former North Carolina Superior Court judge Elaine O'Neal in the Durham mayoral race. She received endorsements from Schewel and from Durham Mayor Pro Tempore Jillian Johnson. Caballero suspended her campaign on October 11, 2021, after results from the primary election showed that O'Neal received 67.96% of the vote and Caballero received 24.63% of the vote. Had Caballero won the election, she would have become the first Latina mayor in the American Southeast outside of Florida.

In 2025, Caballero was appointed as Durham's mayor pro tempore by Mayor Leonardo Williams, becoming the first Latina to hold that office.

== Personal life and volunteer work ==
Caballero is active in the Parent Teacher Association, serving as the president of the organization's chapter at her children's elementary school. As PTA President, Caballero organized a community fresh food delivery and pick up, participated in community rallies, and advocated for a phone application for carpool, to help protect families with undocumented immigration status.
