= Leonard C. Meeker =

American politician

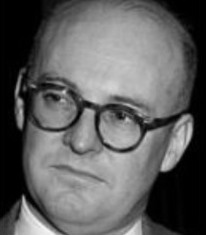

United States Ambassador to Romania
- In office September 16, 1969 – May 10, 1973
- President: Richard Nixon
- Preceded by: Richard H. Davis
- Succeeded by: Harry G. Barnes Jr.

9th Legal Adviser of the Department of State
- In office May 18, 1965 – July 13, 1969
- Preceded by: Abram Chayes
- Succeeded by: John Reese Stevenson

Personal details
- Born: April 4, 1916 Montclair, New Jersey, U.S.
- Died: November 29, 2014 (aged 98) Ocracoke Island, North Carolina, U.S.

Leonard Carpenter Meeker (April 4, 1916 – November 29, 2014) was an American politician, lawyer and diplomat who served as the U.S. Ambassador to Romania. He was the father of Sarah Meeker Jensen FAIA and Charles Meeker, 34th Mayor of Raleigh, North Carolina.

== Early life and education ==
Meeker graduated from Deerfield Academy and Amherst College, and went on to graduate from Harvard Law School, where he was on the board of editors of the Harvard Law Review.

== Government service ==
During World War II, Meeker worked behind Communist lines in China in the Office of Strategic Services. He was honorably discharged from the United States Army in 1946 with the rank of First lieutenant. After the war ended, he began work as a lawyer at the United States Department of the Treasury and later in the office of the Solicitor General of the United States.

During the Kennedy Administration, Meeker worked as an advisor to U.S. Secretary of State Dean Rusk and helped President Kennedy defuse the Cuban Missile Crisis. Meeker went on to serve as a legal advisor to President Lyndon B Johnson. During his time as an advisor, he worked on treaties with Austria, a peace treaty with Japan, and on a variety of United Nations affairs.

While working as a State Department legal adviser, he became convinced the Israelis knew they were attacking an American naval vessel during the 1967 USS Liberty incident: “The Israeli and U.S. Navy accounts of what happened on 8 June 1967 plainly do not jibe. The attacks on the Liberty cannot be written off as accidental. Nor can they really be seen as the result of mis-identification of the ship. In view of the repeated reconnaissance runs by Israeli aircraft over several hours between 0515 and 1245, the air and torpedo boat attacks must be judged as deliberate.”

In 1969, Meeker was nominated by President Richard Nixon to serve as ambassador to Romania. He left the role after Nixon's 1972 re-election.

== Later life ==
After retirement from government service, Meeker worked as an attorney for the Center for Law and Social Policy in Washington, D.C., where he practiced law in the federal courts on matters related to the environment, consumer protection, and human rights.

Meeker also served as chairman of the board of the Contemporary Music Forum and as a member of the boards of the Union of Concerned Scientists and National Academy of Sciences. In 1986, Meeker attended a conference in Moscow on a comprehensive ban of Nuclear weapons testing.

In 2007, Meeker published a three-volume set of his views on life, titled Philosophy and Politics, Experiences and Stories.
