= 2011 Raleigh mayoral election =

Raleigh mayoral election, 2011
- October 11, 2011
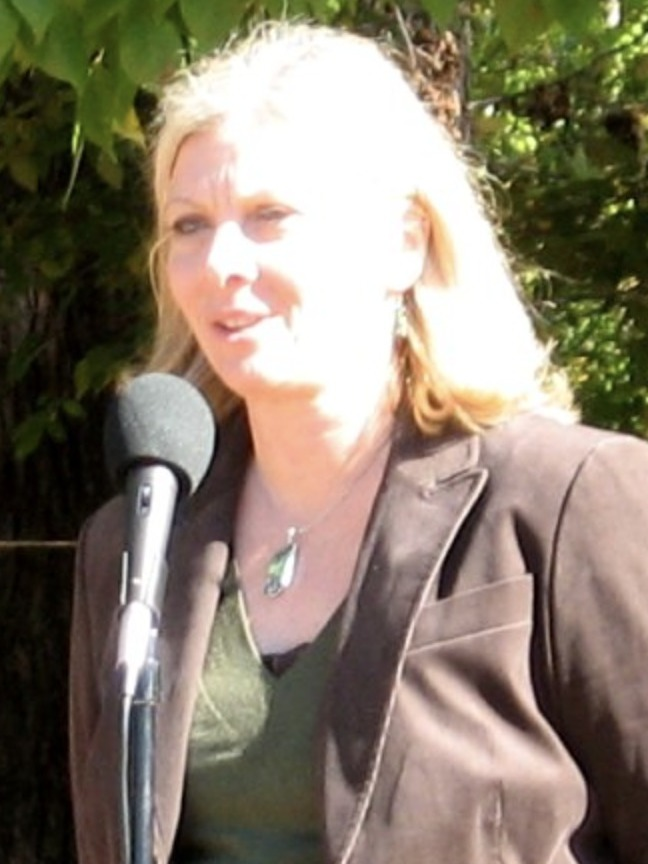

Candidate	Nancy McFarlane	Billie Redmond	Randall Williams
Party	Independent	Republican	Republican
Popular vote	34,548	16,726	5,221
Percentage	61.08%	29.57%	9.23%
Mayor before election
Charles Meeker
Democratic
Elected mayor
Nancy McFarlane
Independent

The Raleigh mayoral election of 2011 was held on October 11, 2011, to elect a Mayor of Raleigh, North Carolina for a two-year term. Incumbent Mayor Charles Meeker announced in April 2011 that he would not run for a sixth term. The election was officially a non-partisan contest, but outgoing Mayor Meeker was well known as a Democrat. Meeker endorsed candidate Nancy McFarlane, who is politically unaffiliated, to succeed him. She won the election with 61 percent of the vote, making a runoff unnecessary.

== Candidates ==
Filed

- Nancy McFarlane, member of City Council and pharmacist
- Billie Redmond, real estate executive
- Randall Williams, obstetrician/gynecologist

Declined

- J. B. Buxton, former deputy state school superintendent
- Seth Keel, 17-year-old high school senior

== Results ==
2011 Raleigh mayoral election
Party	Candidate	Votes	%	±%
Non-partisan	Nancy McFarlane	34,548	61.08	
Non-partisan	Billie Redmond	16,726	29.57	
Non-partisan	Randall Williams	5,221	9.23	
Other	Write-ins	66	0.12	
Turnout		56,561		
