= Sarah Meeker Jensen =

American architect

Sarah Louise Meeker Jensen, FAIA, is an American architect, licensed general contractor, LEED-certified professional, healthcare planner, and founder of the firm Jensen Partners.

== Early life and education ==
Sarah Louise Meeker was born in Washington, D.C. and graduated from the Potomac School in McLean, Virginia, Milton Academy, and Amherst College. Her parents were Leonard C. Meeker and Christine Halliday Meeker. Her father was an American lawyer and diplomat, who served as the U.S. Ambassador to Romania. Her brother Charles Meeker was the 34th Mayor of Raleigh, North Carolina.

She received her Masters of Architecture degree at the University of California, Los Angeles. She married Jay Jensen, a surgeon.

== Work ==
Jensen began her career in the San Francisco office of MLTV/Turnbull Associates. She was recruited by the Office of the UCLA Campus Architect as Director of Campus Planning and served as Assistant Vice Chancellor at the University. She led the transformation of the UCLA Campus following the 1994 Northridge Earthquake, the redesign and reconstruction of the 3.1 million square foot Center for Health Sciences. She oversaw the hiring of I.M. Pei, Kohn Pedersen Fox, Robert A. M. Stern, Cesar Pelli and Ralph Johnson of Perkins and Will.

She founded the architectural firm Jensen and Partners in 2002. Jensen Partners operates today as a national healthcare planning and program management firm with five regional offices and projects in 28 states.

Jensen was named a Fellow of the American Institute of Architects (FAIA) in 2020. As expressed by various chapters of the American Institute of Architects' for her FAIA recognition, "Sarah Meeker Jensen's focus on healthcare economics has forged a new, nationally recognized model for facility planning/design while envisioning the health system of the future."

== Service ==
Since 2017, Jensen serves as the chair of the board of directors of the Natural History Museum of Los Angeles County. She was the President of the Public/Private Board from 2012 to 2017.

Previously having served at its board of directors, she currently is in the President's Council at the Lundquist Institute, previously known as LA BioMed. Her civic involvement includes work with the UCLA School of the Arts & Architecture, The California Museum for History, Women and the Arts, Los Angeles Community College District, American Friends of the Louvre, Los Angeles Area Chamber of Commerce, and Los Angeles Orthopedic Hospital.
