= Elizabeth M. Ward =

American scientist

- Awards: US Public Health Service Meritorious Service Medal, 2012 Calum S. Muir Memorial Award

Academic background
- Education: University of Pennsylvania

Academic work
- Institutions: National Institute for Occupational Safety and Health, American Cancer Society
- Main interests: Epidemiology, cancer disparities, cancer treatment and outcomes, cancer surveillance, and occupational and environmental cancer

Elizabeth M. Ward is an American scientist and researcher for the American Cancer Society. She received her PhD in Epidemiology from the University of Pennsylvania. Ward serves as the National Vice President of Intramural Research for the American Cancer Society and Chair of the World Trade Center Health Program Scientific and Technical Advisory Committee. She has held many positions in various cancer research organizations including a position on the National Cancer Institute's Board of Scientific Counselors for Clinical Sciences and Epidemiology. In recognition for her prominent work in the medical research field, she has received two different awards: U.S. Public Health Service Meritorious Service Medal and the Calum S. Muir Memorial Award. Ward's work is heavily centered around "cancer disparities, cancer treatment and outcomes, cancer surveillance, occupational cancer and environmental cancer."

== Education ==
Ward received her PhD in Epidemiology at the University of Pennsylvania. Following that, she focused her studies on Occupational cancer with her work at the National Institute for Occupational Safety and Health (NIOSH) for 21 years. Ward has continued to focus her work on Epidemiology and Surveillance Research at the American Cancer Society.

== Career ==
In 1995, Ward was appointed Chief of the Industry wide Studies Branch, Division of Surveillance, Hazard Evaluations and Field Studies of National Institute for Occupational Safety and Health. She retired from this position in 2002, and later that year Ward joined the Department of Epidemiology and Surveillance Research at the American Cancer Society. It was here that she was responsible for directing the Surveillance Research group, which led her to her current position as National Vice President for Intramural Research. Ward has been largely involved in various cancer organizations. She has served as the co-chair for the National Coordinating Council for Cancer Surveillance and held a chair position for the Cancer Research Surveillance Committee. Ward has also operated as "the sponsoring member organization representative to the North American Association of Central Cancer Registries." Her involvement grew as she participated in advisory committees for the National Cancer Institute's Shanghai Women's Study and the Sister Study done by the National Institute of Environmental Health Sciences.

Ward also spends time "regularly reviewing articles for occupational and environmental and cancer journals." She has been counted as an attendee of the Peer Review Panel for the National Toxicology Program, as a participant on the Advisory Group for the International Agency for Research on Cancer Monograph program, and has also took part on "expert committees" for the WHO International Programme on Chemical Safety.

Ward has been involved with research as well as in current events and concerns in the community. After the 9/11 attacks, Ward advocated a pro-active stance from the government on testing for cancer of relief workers, given the unique circumstances that existed and the large exposure to unknown hazards.

== Awards ==
In 2002, Ward received the United States Public Health Service Meritorious Service Medal to recognize her "notable career"

In 2012, Ward received the Calum S. Muir Memorial Award "for her enduring dedication to excellence in cancer surveillance, research, and cancer registration and her generous contributions of service and leadership to the NAACCR community."
