= Wake County Board of Commissioners =

Governing body of Wake County

The Wake County Board of Commissioners is the governing board for Wake County, which includes the City of Raleigh.

As of the 2020 census, the population of Wake County was 1,115,000 making it North Carolina's most populated county. Its county seat is Raleigh, which is also the state capital. Wake County is part of the Research Triangle metropolitan region, which encompasses the cities of Raleigh, Durham, Cary and Chapel Hill and their surrounding suburban areas. The regional name originated after the 1959 creation of the Research Triangle Park, located midway between Raleigh and Durham. The Research Triangle region encompasses the U.S. Census Bureau's Combined Statistical Area (CSA) of Raleigh-Durham-Cary. The estimated population of the Raleigh-Durham-Cary CSA was 1,749,525 as of April 1, 2010, with the Raleigh-Cary Metropolitan Statistical Area (MSA) portion at 1,130,490 residents in 2020 census.

Wake County was the 9th fastest growing county in the United States, with the Town of Cary and the City of Raleigh being the 8th and 15th fastest growing cities, respectively. It is presided over by the County Board Chairman.

== Composition ==
Affiliation	Members
Democratic Party	7
Republican Party	0
Total	7

== Current commissioners ==
This is a list of the Wake County Commissioners in order by district. This list is current as of March 2024.

District	Commissioner	In office since	Party
1st	Don Mial	2022	Democratic
2nd	Safiyah Jackson	2014	Democratic
3rd	Cheryl Stallings	2022	Democratic
4th	Susan Evans	2018	Democratic
5th	Tara Waters	2024 (Appointed)	Democratic
6th	Shinica Thomas	2020	Democratic (Chair)
7th	Vickie Adamson	2018	Democratic

== Former commissioners ==
Below is a list of notable former members of the Wake County Board of Commissioners with their dates of service:

- Lynton Y. Ballentine (1926–1934) – later NC Lieutenant Governor and North Carolina Commissioner of Agriculture
- Paul Coble (2006–2014) – previous mayor of Raleigh, later candidate for Congress
- Linda Coleman (1998–2002) – later NC House of Representatives member
- Greg Ford (2016–2020) – educator; first out LGBT Wake County elected official
- Tony Gurley (2002–2014) – later chief operating officer for the Office of State Budget and Management
- Jessica Holmes (2014-2018) – lawyer; 2020 candidate for North Carolina Commissioner of Labor, state auditor designee
- J. T. Knott (1970–1982) – farmer, WWII veteran, businessman
- Vernon Malone (1980–2002) – educator; also chair of Wake County Board of Education and member of NC Senate
- Les Merritt (1994–1998) – later State Auditor of North Carolina
- Betty Lou Ward (1988–2016) – community volunteer; longest service as Wake County commissioner
- Maria Cervania (2020-2022) – Current NC House of Representatives member
