= The NewDEAL =

American political organization

The NewDEAL is an American Democratic Party-affiliated political organization founded in 2011 by honorary co-chairs Governor Martin O'Malley of Maryland and U.S. Senator Mark Begich of Alaska to promote "pro-growth progressive state and local elected leaders and their innovative ideas from across the country." DEAL is an acronym for "Developing Exceptional American Leaders."

Steve Benen of Washington Monthly described the network as an attempt to create "a farm team" for Democrats to identify "future stars."
