= Liz Ward (artist) =

American artist (born 1959)

Liz Ward (1959) is an American artist. Ward was born in Lafayette, Louisiana. She has worked in a variety of media, including photography, textiles, painting and sculpture, and her work is held by several notable museums. She is a professor of Art and Art history at Trinity University and is a resident of San Antonio, TX.

== Education ==
After earning a BFA from University of New Mexico, Albuquerque (1982), she continued her education at Tamarind Institute, Albuquerque, NM and Atelier 17, Paris, France following up with an MFA from University of Houston, TX (1990).

== Collections ==
Her work is included in the collections of the Museum of Fine Arts, Houston, the Whitney Museum of American Art, and the Tyler Museum of Art.
