= 2001 Raleigh mayoral election =

Raleigh mayoral election, 2001
- October 9, 2001 and November 6, 2001

Candidate	Charles Meeker	Paul Coble
Party	Democratic	Republican
Popular vote	25,655	24,599
Percentage	50.97%	48.87%
Mayor before election
Paul Coble
Republican
Elected mayor
Charles Meeker
Democratic

The Raleigh mayoral election of 2001 was held on November 6, 2001, to elect a Mayor of Raleigh, North Carolina. The election was non-partisan. It was won by Charles Meeker, who defeated incumbent Paul Coble in the run-off. A third candidate was eliminated in the first round on October 9.

== Results ==
2001 Raleigh mayoral election
Candidate	Votes	%
Paul Coble (incumbent)	19,279	49.15
Charles Meeker	18,692	47.65
Joel Cornette	767	1.96
Write-ins	489	1.25
Turnout	39,227	%

2001 Raleigh mayoral election runoff
Candidate	Votes	%
Charles Meeker	25,655	50.97
Paul Coble (incumbent)	24,599	48.87
Write-ins	83	0.16
Turnout	50,337	%
