= Elizabeth Jane Ward =

Australian evangelist (1842–1908)

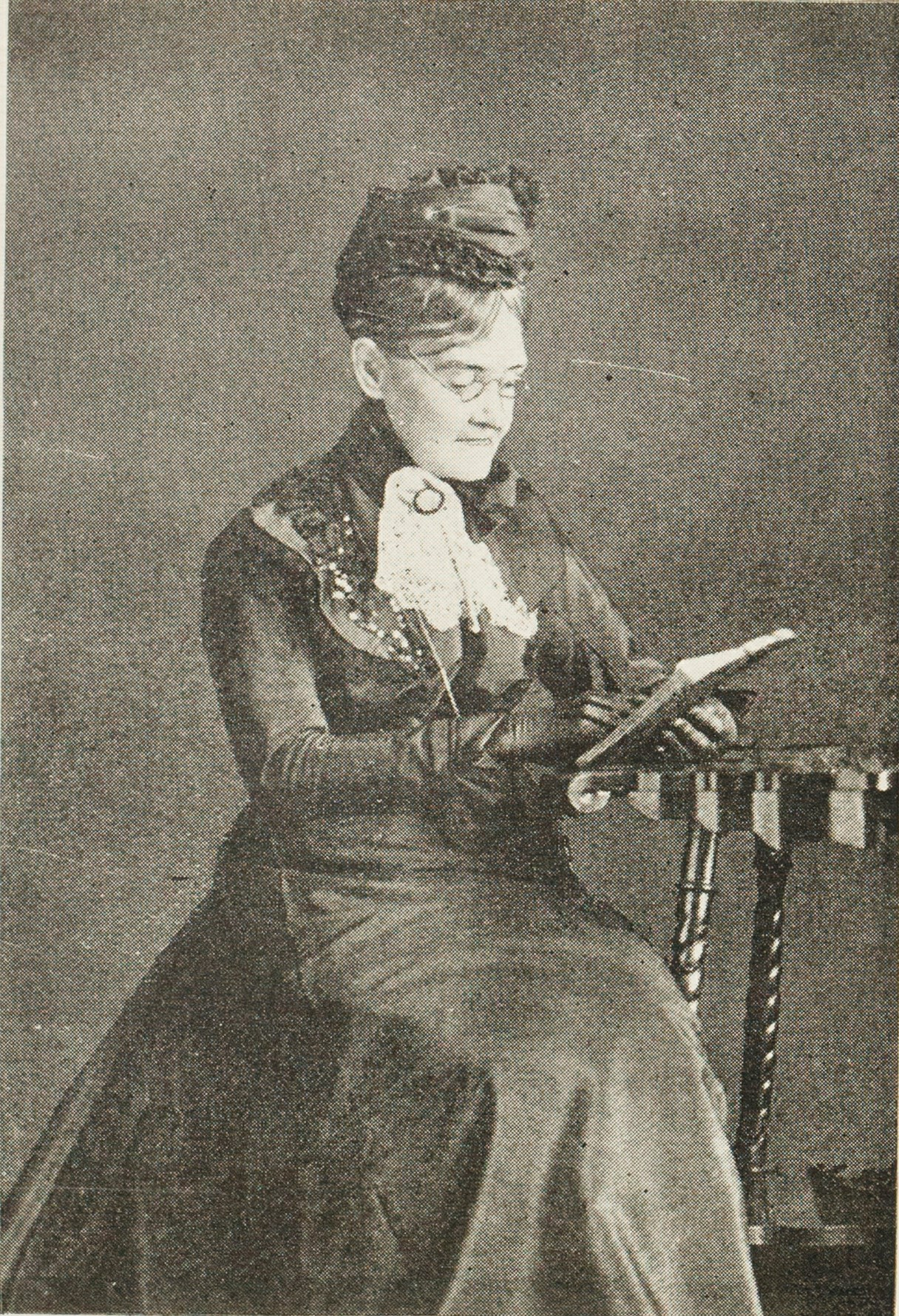
- Born: 27 March 1842; Sydney, New South Wales
- Died: 29 May 1908 (aged 66); Watsons Bay, Sydney
- Known for: Suffragette and women's activist
- Spouse: Charles Ward
- Children: 7 sons

Elizabeth Jane Ward (27 March 1842 – 29 May 1908) was an Australian evangelist and active parish worker for the Church of England known for her involvement in various women's Christian organisations and campaigning for women's suffrage.

== Early life ==
Ward was born in George Street, Sydney on 27 March 1842, a daughter of William Garland and Sarah (née Jenks). At fourteen years of age her father died followed by her mother, leaving behind two daughters and two sons.

Educated at a Ladies School in Liverpool Street, she was taught fine sewing and at the age of fifteen began working as a milliner in George Street and later at Farmer & Company in Pitt Street.

On 18 July 1863, she married Charles Ward from Shropshire, England, and bore seven sons.

== Working life ==
=== Business ===
She established her own millinery business in King Street and later moved to Oxford Street.

=== Charitable work ===
Ward was a member of multiple committees. She served on the committees of the Queen’s Fund in aid of distressed women and the Women’s Industries Exhibition and Centennial Fair. She assisted the poor through the Woman's Christian Temperance Union, the Ladies’ United Evangelistic Association, and the Young Women's Christian Association. She helped found the ladies committee of the Sydney City Mission which established the Rescue Committee to help the ‘fallen’ women of the city by organising midnight suppers and invitations to meet and talk with her if in need of advice or sympathy.

=== Women's suffrage and activism ===
She joined the National Council of Women of New South Wales. To further the cause of Federation, she assisted in the formation of a women's branch of the Federal League. She advocated, wrote letters, and held public meetings on woman suffrage. She joined the Women's Suffrage League of New South Wales in 1890 and in 1891 was appointed the first colonial superintendent of franchise in New South Wales. She maintained contact with WCTU's all over the colony advocating womanhood suffrage and was influential in gaining many over to the cause.

== Christian organisations ==
Ward was associated with various Christian organisations holding various positions. From 1883 she was involved in the Sydney Woman's Prayer Union as a founder and secretary advocating prayer and petitioning Parliament with a request that theatres be closed on Sundays (subsequently a law was passed) and that parliamentary sittings be opened with prayer which was declined.

A member of the Young Women's Christian Association (Y.W.C.A.) since establishment, she formed the Surry Hills branch in 1890, where she undertook bible reading, prayers and lectures. In 1897 Elizabeth was forced to resign from presidency due to poor health.

In 1884, Ward joined the Woman's Christian Temperance Union (WCTU) and later became vice-president and State superintendent of press work.

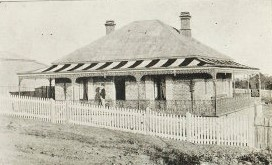
"Beulah" Blackheath, New South Wales. Residence of Elizabeth Jane Ward

== Later life ==
By 1903, she relocated to Blackheath in the Blue Mountains and held her positions as vice-president and State press superintendent and correspondent for the Sydney Woman's Christian Temperance Union.

Her autobiography Out of weakness made strong (1903), gives a chronicle of her life and her work on womanhood suffrage.

Ward died on 29 May 1908 at Watsons Bay, Sydney, aged 66.
