= 2015 Raleigh mayoral election =

Raleigh mayoral election, 2015
- October 6, 2015
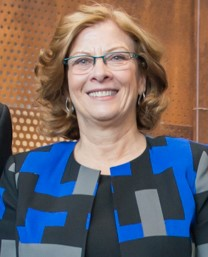

Candidate	Nancy McFarlane	Robert Weltzin
Party	Independent	Republican
Popular vote	26,911	9,137
Percentage	74.35%	25.24%
Mayor before election
Nancy McFarlane
Independent
Elected mayor
Nancy McFarlane
Independent

The biennial election for the Mayor of Raleigh, North Carolina was held on Tuesday, Oct. 6, 2015. The election was nonpartisan. Incumbent Mayor Nancy McFarlane won a third term in office.

== Candidates ==
- Nancy McFarlane, Mayor since 2011, former City Council member
- Dr. Robert "Bob" Weltzin, chiropractor and candidate for Mayor in 2013

== Results ==
2015 Raleigh mayoral election - Unofficial results
Party	Candidate	Votes	%	±%
No party on ballot	Nancy McFarlane	26,677	74.36	+2
No party on ballot	Robert Weltzin	9,053	25.23	
Other	Write-ins	147	0.41	
Turnout		42,103		
