= Betty Lou Ward =

American politician from North Carolina

Member of the Wake County Board of Commissioners from the 6th district
- In office December 5, 1988 – December 5, 2016
- Preceded by: Larry Zieverink Sr.
- Succeeded by: Greg Ford

President of the National Association of Counties
- In office July 1998 – July 1999

Personal details
- Born: Betty Lou Cofield; March 12, 1936
- Died: November 8, 2023 (aged 87)
- Party: Democratic
- Spouse: Bill Ward
- Children: 2
- Occupation: politician

Betty Lou Ward (née Cofield; March 12, 1936 – November 8, 2023) was an American politician. She was the longest serving commissioner on the Wake County Board of Commissioners, holding office from 1988 to 2016. Ward served as president of the National Association of Counties from 1998 to 1999 and served as chair of the association's Arts and Culture commission from 2000 to 2008.

== Career ==
Ward served as a Wake County commissioner for 28 years, from 1988 to 2016. She advocated for public education, the arts, and public parks during her time as commissioner.

She served as president of the National Association of Counties from July 1998 to July 1999. She went on to serve as the Association's chair of Arts and Culture from 2000 to 2008.

She was the first person to receive the National Award for County Arts Leadership from Americans for the Arts.

=== Electoral history ===
==== 2012 ====
Wake County Board of Commissioners 6th district general election, 2012
Party	Candidate	Votes	%
Democratic	Betty Lou Ward (incumbent)	258,983	56.61%
Republican	Paul Fitts	198,538	43.39%
Total votes		457,521	100%
Democratic hold			

==== 2008 ====
Wake County Board of Commissioners 6th district general election, 2008
Party	Candidate	Votes	%
Democratic	Betty Lou Ward (incumbent)	234,782	57.61%
Republican	Larry F. Tilley	172,780	42.39%
Total votes		407,562	100%
Democratic hold			

==== 2004 ====
Wake County Board of Commissioners 6th district general election, 2004
Party	Candidate	Votes	%
Democratic	Betty Lou Ward (incumbent)	178,000	54.20%
Republican	Chris Malone	150,405	45.80%
Total votes		328,405	100%
Democratic hold			

== Death ==
Ward died on November 8, 2023. Her funeral was held on December 6, 2023, at Edenton Street United Methodist Church.
