= 2013 Raleigh mayoral election =

Raleigh mayoral election, 2013
- October 8, 2013
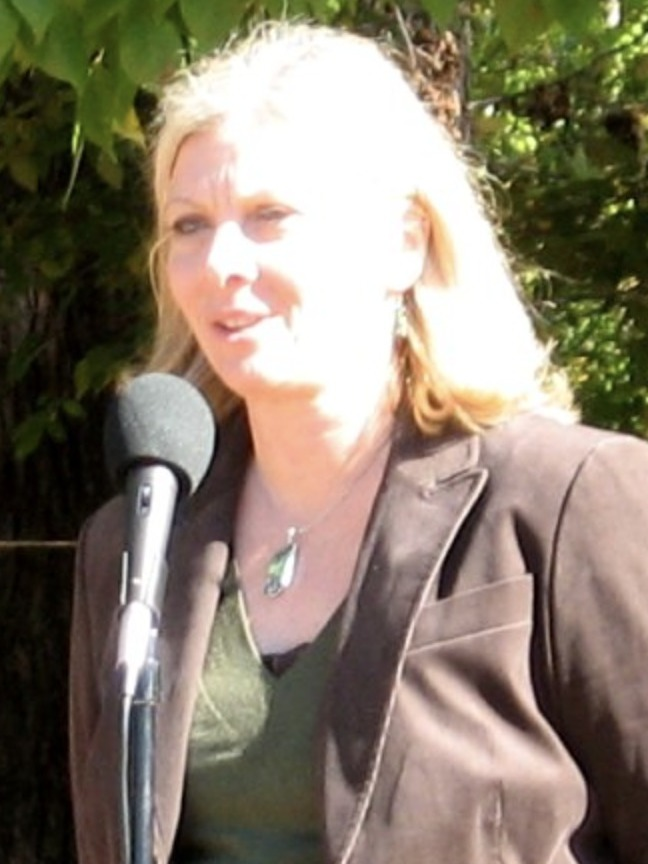

| Candidate | Nancy McFarlane | Robert Weltzin | Venita Peyton |
| Party | Independent | Republican | Republican |
| Popular vote | 32,549 | 9,765 | 2,307 |
| Percentage | 72.76% | 21.83% | 5.16% |
Mayor before election
Nancy McFarlane
Independent
Elected mayor
Nancy McFarlane
Independent

The biennial election for the Mayor of Raleigh, North Carolina was held on October 8, 2013. The election was nonpartisan. Incumbent Mayor Nancy McFarlane ran for a second term. She received a majority of the vote on October 8, thus avoiding a runoff, which would have been held on November 5.

== Candidates ==
- Nancy McFarlane, Mayor since 2011, former City Council member
- Venita Peyton, real estate broker
- Robert Weltzin, chiropractor

== Results ==
2013 Raleigh mayoral election
| Party | Candidate | Votes | % | ±% |
|---|---|---|---|---|
| Non-partisan | Nancy McFarlane | 32,549 | 72.76 | +11 |
| Non-partisan | Robert Weltzin | 9,765 | 21.83 | |
| Non-partisan | Venita Peyton | 2,307 | 5.16 | |
| Other | Write-ins | 112 | 0.25 | |
| Turnout | | 44,733 | | |
