= Mary-Ann Baldwin =

Mayor of Raleigh, North Carolina, United States

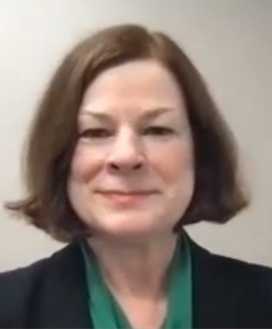

62nd Mayor of Raleigh
- In office December 2, 2019 – December 2, 2024
- Preceded by: Nancy McFarlane
- Succeeded by: Janet Cowell

Member of the Raleigh City Council from the at-large district
- In office December 2007 – December 2017 Serving with Russ Stephenson
- Preceded by: Joyce Kekas
- Succeeded by: Nicole Stewart

Personal details
- Born: 1956 or 1957 (age 69–70) Pawtucket, Rhode Island, U.S.
- Party: Democratic
- Education: University of Rhode Island (BA)
- Website: Campaign website

Mary-Ann Baldwin is an American marketing executive and politician from the state of North Carolina. A member of the Democratic Party, she was the mayor of Raleigh, North Carolina, serving from 2019 to 2024, and previously served on the Raleigh City Council from 2007 to 2017.

== Early life and education ==
Baldwin grew up in Rhode Island and graduated from the University of Rhode Island. She is married to Jim Baldwin, her fifth husband, and she has two children, a daughter and son-in-law. She also has two step-children.

== Career ==
=== Baldwin communications ===
Prior to political service, she worked in the marketing field, including working as marketing director for several firms and managing her own consulting firm, Baldwin Communications.

=== City council service ===
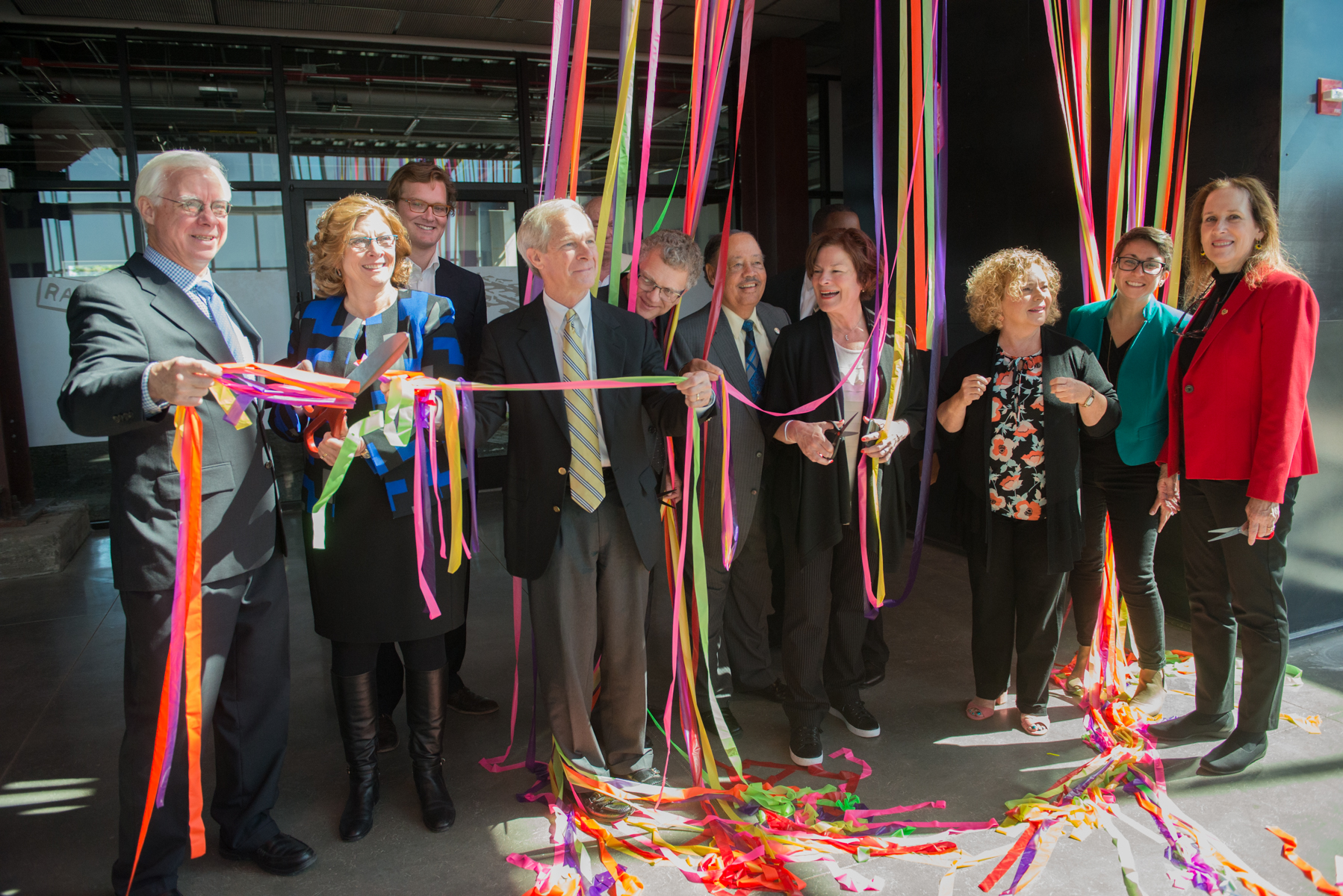
Baldwin (fourth from right) at the grand opening of the Raleigh Union Station in 2018

She served on the Raleigh City Council for ten years, from 2007 through 2017 during the mayoral terms of Charles Meeker and Nancy McFarlane. While on the city council, she served as chair of the Law & Public Safety Committee and the Transportation Committee, and served on several other committees, as well as acting as the city's representative to GoTriangle, a regional transportation authority. When Meeker decided to step down prior to the 2011 election, he approached both Baldwin and McFarlane to run for mayor in his stead, Baldwin however declined the offer to run, as she was dealing with personal issues, she felt would interfere with her ability to effectively campaign and serve in the role as mayor.

=== Mayoral tenure ===
On March 27, 2019, Baldwin announced that she would be running for mayor of Raleigh in the 2019 election to succeed McFarlane, who was stepping down as mayor in the midst of health troubles. Baldwin came in first place, winning 38% of the vote. A runoff was not requested by Charles Francis, the runner-up, and so Baldwin became mayor of Raleigh. She assumed office December 2, 2019. Baldwin ran for reelection in 2022, defeating DaQuanta Copeland and Terrance Ruth. On April 16, 2024, Baldwin announced that she would not seek reelection.

In May 2022, Baldwin faced criticism following a reported confrontation with a young fan at a Carolina Hurricanes playoff game in Raleigh. Witnesses told WRAL that Baldwin confronted the child and made her cry, prompting security to intervene. The incident was also discussed in local commentary.

==== Response to COVID-19 ====
Baldwin was mayor while the COVID-19 pandemic impacted Raleigh. On June 17, 2020, she made a proclamation that mandated masks. Baldwin made a second mask mandate on August 13, 2021, due to the rise in the Delta variant that she later terminated on February 18, 2022. Mayor Baldwin tested positive for COVID-19 on April 18, 2022.

==== Response to George Floyd Protests ====
Baldwin was mayor during the George Floyd protests in Raleigh. In the midst of rioting she declared a citywide curfew. Her response was criticized in the following weeks.

==== Tax Increment Grant (TIG) and Property Tax Increase ====
On May 4, 2021, Raleigh City Council approved a tax increment grant (TIG) policy which Mayor Baldwin voted in favor of. Mayor Baldwin received campaign contributions from developer John Kane, who may benefit from the TIG. The TIG policy allows the city of Raleigh to provide up to $5 million per year (2% of the annual budget) in tax rebates to private developers, effectively shielding them from increases in property taxes due to rising property values. A month later on June 1, 2021, Raleigh City Council passed an annual budget that included an increase in property taxes generating an increased $7 million per year which was supported by Mayor Baldwin.

==== Gun violence ====
Baldwin responded after the 2022 Raleigh shootings killed five people, including a law enforcement employee.

== See also ==
- List of mayors of the 50 largest cities in the United States

Political offices
Preceded by Nancy McFarlane	Mayor of Raleigh; 2019–2024	Succeeded by Janet Cowell
