= 2017 Raleigh mayoral election =

- October 10 and November 7, 2017
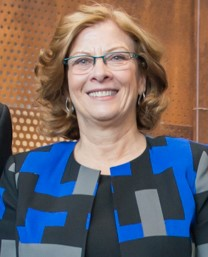

| Candidate | Nancy McFarlane | Charles Francis |
| Party | Independent | Democratic |
| Popular vote | 31,643 | 23,222 |
| Percentage | 57.67% | 42.33% |
Mayor before election
Nancy McFarlane
Independent
Elected mayor
Nancy McFarlane
Independent

The biennial nonpartisan election for the Mayor of Raleigh, North Carolina, was held on Tuesday, Oct. 10, 2017. As no candidate won a majority of the vote in the first round, a runoff was held on November 7, 2017, as requested by the second-place finisher, Charles Francis. Incumbent Mayor Nancy McFarlane defeated Francis in the runoff, winning a fourth term in office.

This was the first Raleigh mayoral election to advance to a second round since 2001.

== Candidates ==
=== Declared ===
- Paul Fitts
- Charles Francis, attorney and former City Council member
- Nancy McFarlane, Mayor since 2011, former City Council member

== First-round Results ==
Oct. 2017 Raleigh mayoral election
| Party | Candidate | Votes | % | ±% |
|---|---|---|---|---|
| Non-partisan (Note: McFarlane is registered Unaffiliated (Independent)) | Nancy McFarlane | 25,626 | 48.42 | -25.94 |
| Non-partisan (Note: Francis is registered as a Democrat) | Charles Francis | 19,441 | 36.73 | |
| Non-partisan (Note: Fitts is registered as a Republican) | Paul Fitts | 7,802 | 14.74 | |
| Other | Write-ins | 57 | 0.11 | −0.30 |
| Turnout | | 52,507 | | |

== Runoff Results ==
Nov. 2017 Raleigh mayoral election runoff
| Party | Candidate | Votes | % | ±% |
|---|---|---|---|---|
| Non-partisan | Nancy McFarlane | 31,643 | 57.67 | +9.24 |
| Non-partisan | Charles Francis | 23,222 | 42.33 | +5.61 |
| Turnout | | 54,865 | | |
