= Nancy McFarlane =

American politician in North Carolina (born 1955)

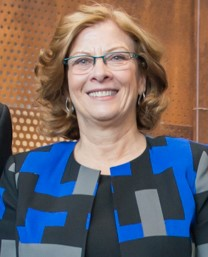

61st Mayor of Raleigh
- In office December 5, 2011 – December 2, 2019
- Preceded by: Charles Meeker
- Succeeded by: Mary-Ann Baldwin

Personal details
- Born: July 20, 1956 (age 69) Washington, D.C., U.S.
- Party: Independent
- Other political affiliations: Democratic (endorsed)
- Education: Virginia Commonwealth University (BS)

Nancy Pletcher McFarlane is an American pharmacist and politician. She served as the 61st mayor of Raleigh, North Carolina, the state capital. She was elected to lead the city in the 2011 election, and succeeded Charles Meeker, who had declined to run for re-election to another term. McFarlane is a political independent (called "Unaffiliated" in North Carolina) but ran with the endorsement of the local Democratic Party. She was re-elected for three further terms, in 2013, 2015, and 2017, but declined to run for re-election in 2019.

Before her election as mayor, McFarlane was a pharmacist and small business owner, served on the Raleigh City Council. She was elected in 2007 and re-elected without opposition in 2009. She left her seat on the council when she was elected mayor.

== Early life and education ==
Nancy Pletcher McFarlane was born in Washington, D.C., on July 20, 1956, to Jean Pletcher and the late Ralph Pletcher. Joined by her brothers, the family lived in Arlington, Virginia, where McFarlane formed an early impression that the congestion there was a detriment to living quality. "I know what large, poorly planned growth can do to an area," she said during her 2011 run for mayor.

McFarlane earned a Bachelor of Science in pharmacy from Virginia Commonwealth University's School of Pharmacy at the Medical College of Virginia. While there, she met Ron McFarlane, who was pursuing a degree in pharmacy as well. She married him in 1980. In 2010 the McFarlanes received the Distinguished Pharmacy Alumni Award from Virginia Commonwealth University for the contributions they have made to the profession of pharmacy.

== Career ==
After graduating from Virginia Commonwealth University, McFarlane worked as a hospital pharmacist in Richmond, Virginia until she and her husband moved to Raleigh, North Carolina in 1984. She later worked briefly as a retail pharmacist and then spent 15 years at Raleigh Community Hospital (now known as Duke Raleigh North) as a hospital pharmacist while raising her three children.

=== MedPro Rx ===
In 2002, after 22 years as a retail and hospital pharmacist, McFarlane launched MedPro Rx, Inc., an accredited specialty infusion pharmacy that provides infusion medications and services to clients with chronic illnesses. "I wanted to provide more than medicine," she said. "I wanted to offer the support and services that are often lost in bigger companies." She has built the company into one of Inc. Magazine's fastest-growing companies from 2009 to 2011. In 2013, McFarlane was named one of the top entrepreneurs in the Triangle region by Business Leader Magazine.

=== City council service ===
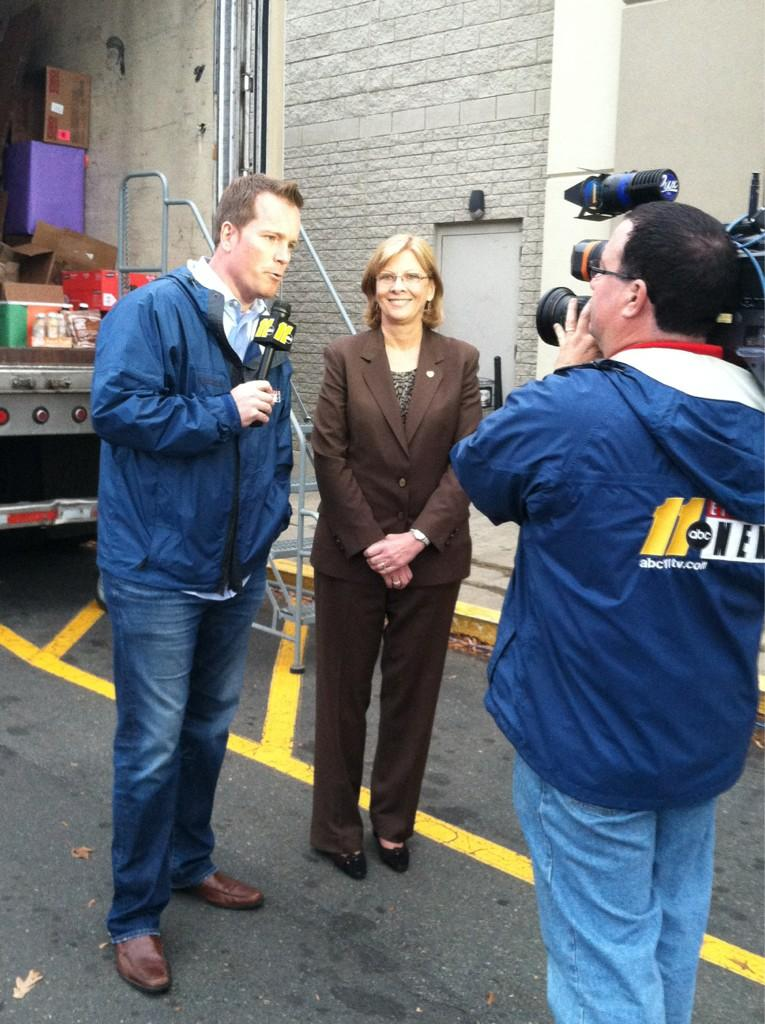
McFarlane being interviewed by an ABC 11 news television crew in 2012

McFarlane won the District A City Council seat in 2007, and ran without opposition in 2009. She served on the Budget and Economic Development Committee and was chair of the Comprehensive Planning Committee.

McFarlane worked with the Coalition to Unchain Dogs which works to mitigate the negative consequences of keeping dogs chained and she initiated the tasking of the City Attorney to draw up the Dog Tethering Ordinance which was unanimously passed by the City Council on March 3, 2009, and took effect July 1 of that year.

=== Mayoral service ===
When her predecessor in the office, Charles Meeker, decided to not seek re-election as mayor in 2011, he suggested to both McFarlane and fellow city councilor (and eventual successor) Mary-Ann Baldwin that one of the two should run in his place. She had been approached earlier with a similar suggestion, but considering herself largely apolitical, turned down the offer at that time. Baldwin was, at the time, dealing with personal issues and declined to run, so McFarlane accepted the offer, and decided to run for mayor that year. Running as an unaffiliated candidate, she won 61% of the vote over the next candidate, a Republican.

Being new to politics, she frequently sought advice both from her predecessor Meeker and former Raleigh mayor Thomas Bradshaw, as well as then New York City mayor Michael Bloomberg. She developed a leadership style described as "dull", with her council meetings almost always featuring unanimous votes. This was due to her efforts holding discussions with council members outside of meetings to handle negotiations out of the public eye, and keep meetings efficient.

She presided over Raleigh during a period of unprecedented growth, as the formerly moribund downtown area was rebuilt, and as the population growth was among the highest in the United States. Her biggest achievement during her time as mayor, and the one fraught with the most controversy, was the acquisition of the 325-acre campus of the former Dorothea Dix Hospital, which had been sought by the city for some time as a potential large public park. At a time when North Carolina state party politics was shifting from Democratic to Republican control of the legislature and major state offices, McFarlane finalized a deal during the last months of outgoing governor Bev Perdue's term for the state of North Carolina (which owned the Dix property) to lease the land to the city of Raleigh. The new governor, Pat McCrory, backed by the legislature, made several attempts early in his term to halt or reverse the deal, but she developed a close working relationship with McCrory, himself a former mayor of a large North Carolina city (Charlotte) and in 2015, he reversed his former position and the lease was signed, allowing the city to build its park on the land.

McFarlane remained popular and was easily re-elected in 2013 and 2015, with her only serious opposition coming from Charles Francis during the 2017 campaign. Following the 2017 election, her formerly smooth working relationship with the council was upended when internal political divisions led to several factions developing within the council, and unlike her prior terms, where there was little public debate, council meetings became acrimonious affairs where several council members attempted to form a "working majority" to steer the council in their own political direction and away from McFarlane's.

Following surgery to correct debilitating back pain, on March 13, 2019, McFarlane announced that she would not be seeking re-election to a fifth term as mayor. She was replaced in the 2019 election as mayor by her long-time political ally Mary-Ann Baldwin, and many of the council members who stood against her during her last term as mayor lost their seats on the city council, with the Baldwin administration re-enacting many of McFarlane's prior policies and programs.

== See also ==
- List of mayors of Raleigh, North Carolina
- List of mayors of the largest 50 US cities

Political offices
Preceded by Charles Meeker	Mayor of Raleigh; 2011–2019	Succeeded by Mary-Ann Baldwin
