= George Floyd protests in North Carolina =

2020 civil unrest after the murder of George Floyd

- Part of George Floyd protests
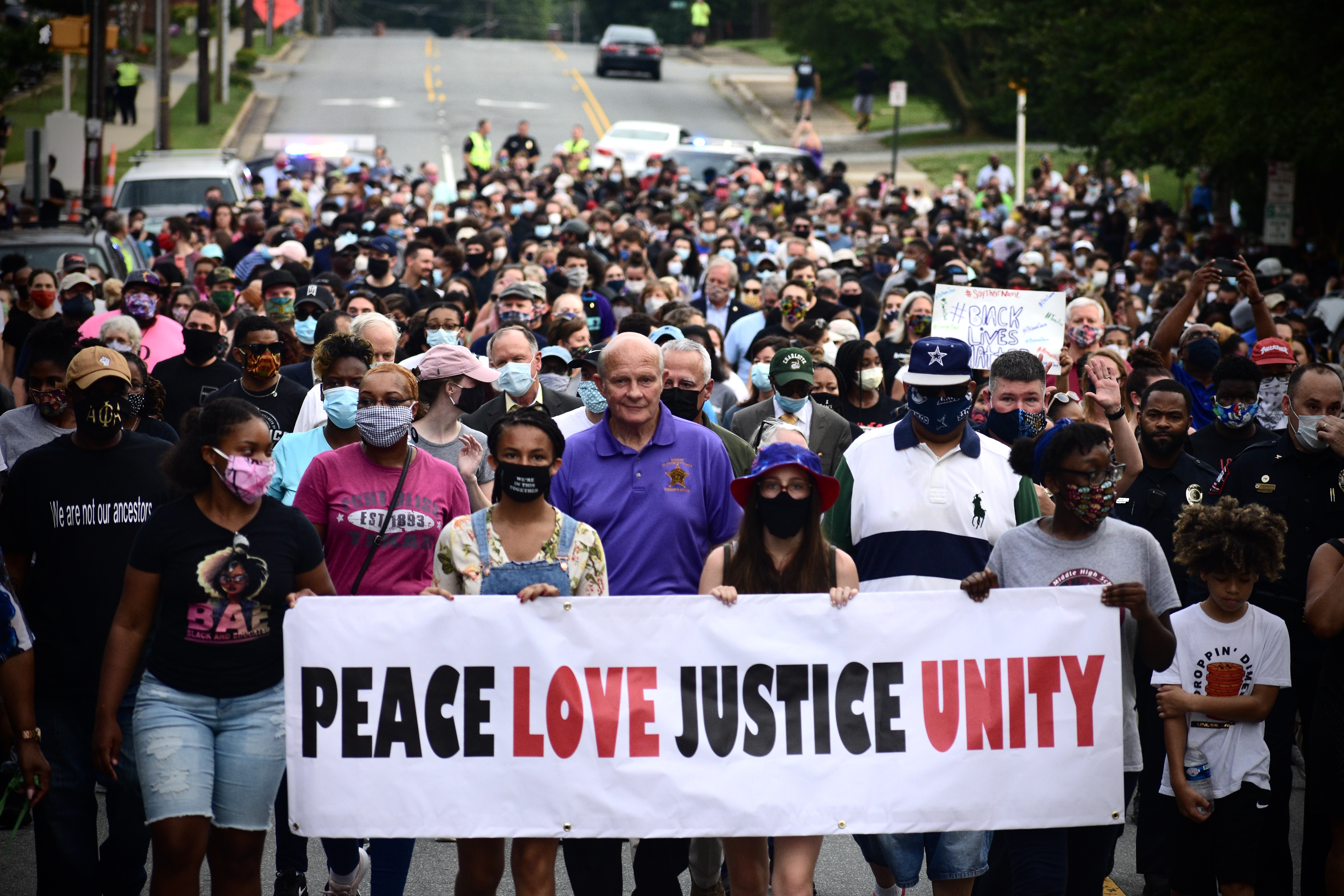
- Protesters marching in Alamance County
- Date: May 29 – June 24, 2020 (3 weeks and 5 days)
- Location: North Carolina, United States
- Caused by: Police brutality; Institutional racism against African Americans; Reaction to the murder of George Floyd; Economic, racial and social inequality

Cities in North Carolina in which a protest with about 100 or more participants was held

This is a list of George Floyd protests in North Carolina, United States.

Protesters chanting in Chapel Hill

== Locations ==
=== Asheville ===
- May 31: Hundreds of protesters shut down parts of I-240 near the Captain Jeff Bowen bridge to protest the murder of George Floyd.
- June 1: Protesters gathered outside the Asheville Police Department, where they were met with tear gas. A statue of Confederate officer Zebulon Baird Vance was also vandalized.
- June 2: Video was captured of police officers destroying a city-approved medical station. Officers destroyed water bottles by stomping on them or stabbing them with knives. Other officers destroyed medical supplies, including bandages and saline. Mayor Esther Manheimer called the incident "a disappointing moment in an otherwise peaceful evening."

=== Beaufort ===
A group of nearly 100 people gathered peacefully on the Turner Street bridge on June 2.

=== Boone ===
On June 7, over 1,000 marched from App State campus to the Watauga County Courthouse.

=== Burnsville ===
A vigil was hosted by the Yancey/Mitchell Branch of the NAACP at the town square on June 2, drawing a crowd of about 350.

=== Chapel Hill ===
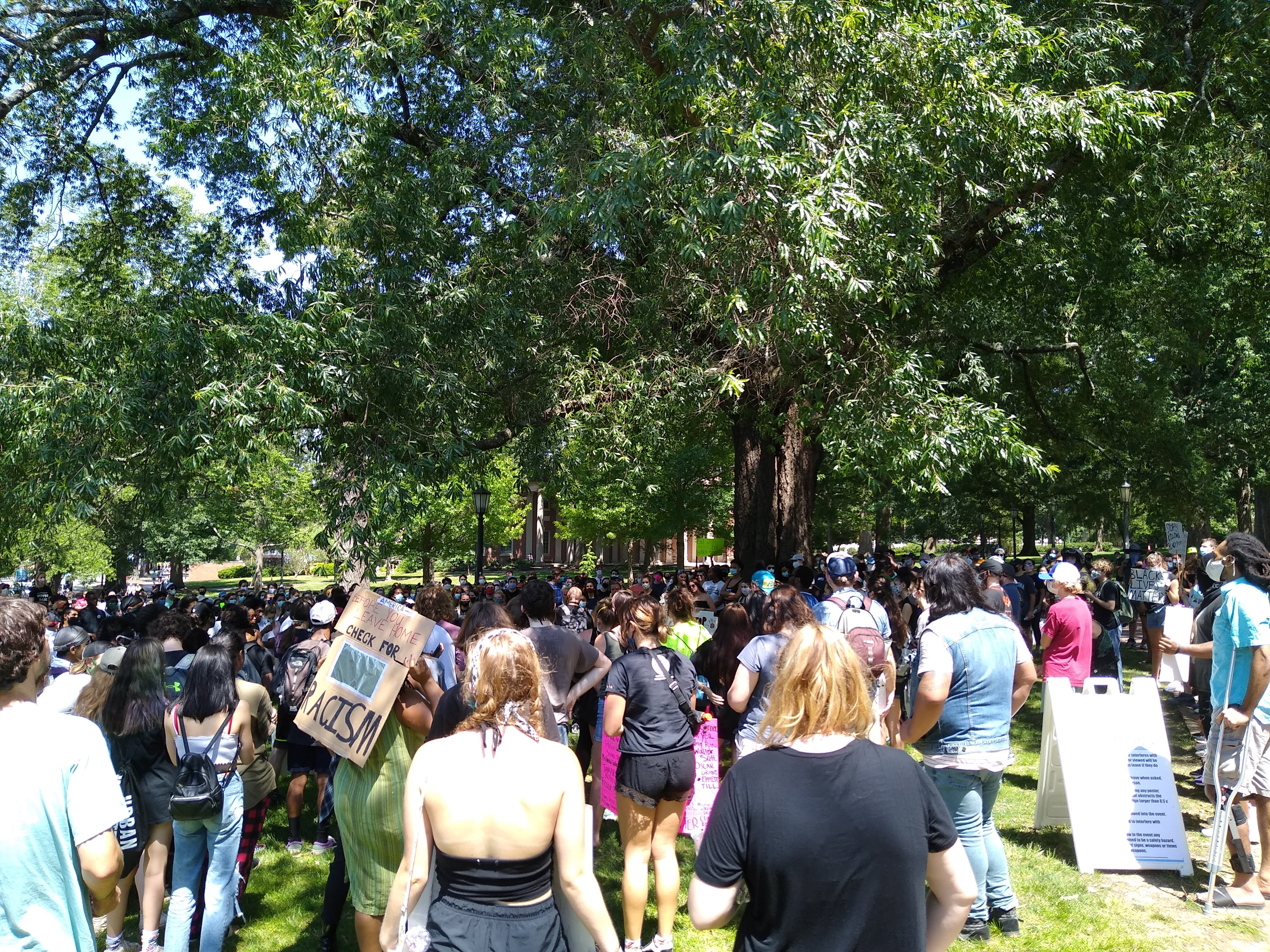
Chapel Hill on June 3

More than 1,000 people protested peacefully on Franklin Street on June 3. Another march took place on June 5, with many protesters wearing purple to honor Breonna Taylor, and another march was held on June 6.

=== Charlotte ===
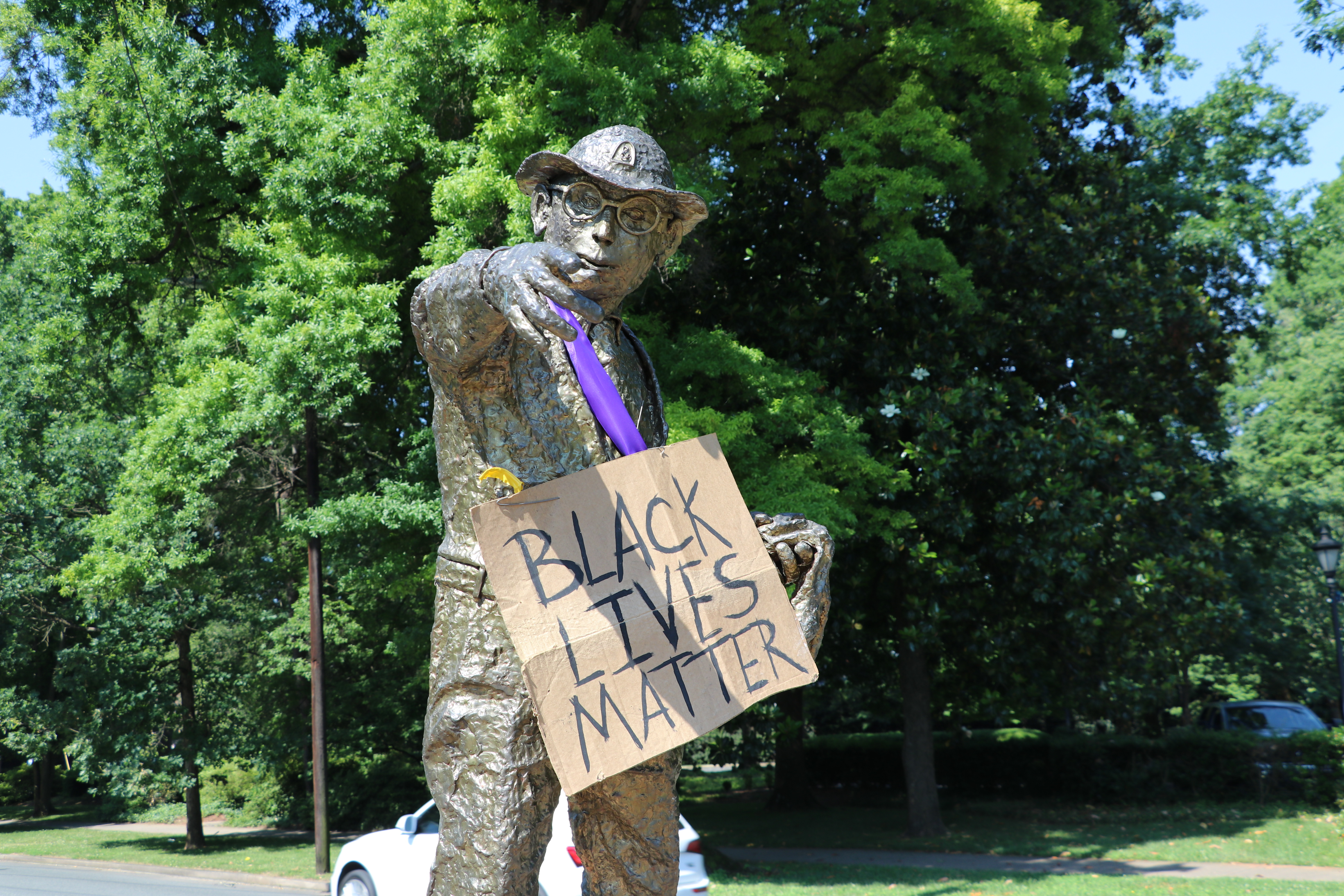
"Black Lives Matter" placard on a statue in Charlotte on June 4

Hundreds of people marched down Beatties Ford Road on May 29. Some protesters threw rocks and bottles at police, smashed the windows of police vehicles and jumped on them, and stole a bike from an officer. Police used pepper spray bullets to break up the protest. Some protesters also smashed store windows and looted in the University Park Shopping Center. On May 30, the protest grew and gathered in Uptown Charlotte, blocking traffic on Interstate 277 and later through the downtown district. The Charlotte-Mecklenburg Police Department fired tear gas and rubber bullets into the crowds. The city was also placed under a State of Emergency. City Councilman Braxton Winston was among those arrested May 29. On May 31, 1,500 more protesters in Uptown Charlotte blocked streets, threw fireworks, and assaulted police officers. 25 arrests were made. Several more businesses were vandalized and looted.

On June 1, approximately 200 protesters marched in Uptown Charlotte. While a demonstration at Freedom Park was peaceful, elsewhere police made reports that some protesters threw rocks and firecrackers. Officers issued dispersal orders at Church Street and MLK Street, and one arrest was made. On June 2, another crowd of thousands of protesters in Uptown Charlotte threw bottles at police and blocked light rail train tracks. Police fired pepper spray and stun grenades at protesters, blocked them from Interstate 277 and ordered them to disperse. Protesters who refused to leave were met with tougher brutality as officers chased them on bikes and made one more arrest. At 11:00 pm, police armed with tear gas gave one more chase to protesters at Tryon Street.

=== Clinton ===
A peaceful march took place on Highway 24 in the heart of Clinton on May 31.

=== Concord ===
On June 13 a peaceful march was held, starting at James L. Dorton Park and continuing through parts of Concord.

=== Dunn ===
On June 4, hundreds marched to Dunn City Hall in a demonstration of peace and unity. Police officers and county officials joined with the protesters and the event remained peaceful.

=== Durham ===
About 100 protesters marched to police headquarters on May 30. On June 1, at least 1000 people marched peacefully downtown while about 60 blocked the Durham Freeway to successfully secure a meeting with law enforcement and other officials.

On June 24, three women were arrested during a protest for slowing down traffic on I-40. Drivers participating in the protest slowed their speed to 10 miles an hour for eight minutes and 46 seconds.

=== Fayetteville ===
A peaceful protest was organized for 3 p.m. on May 30. Hundreds marched down Skibo Road. Rapper J. Cole spoke to the crowd. It remained non-violent until that evening, when protesters burned a U.S. flag in front of the historic Market House before vandalizing and lighting fires in it. Rioters then broke into Cross Creek Mall and several businesses along Skibo Road, where damage and looting occurred. Over 160 firearms were stolen from multiple gun stores during the unrest.

=== Gastonia ===
Between 350-500 people, approximately half being white and half being black, held a vigil remembering George Floyd at the Rotary Pavilion in downtown Gastonia on the evening of June 7th. The rally saw speeches delivered by both Democratic and Republican politicians emphasizing the need for change in unity, with Democratic representative Danny Caudill stating "Change happens when we come together with one voice and refuse to be silenced."

=== Goldsboro ===
A peaceful protest was held in Goldsboro on the evening of May 31 until roughly 10 pm. The protest started on Center Street before moving to the Wayne County, North Carolina courthouse and then the local police station. "Hands Up, Don't Shoot," "Black Lives Matter" and "no Justice, No Peace" were the most common chants made among protesters. No vandalism was reported.

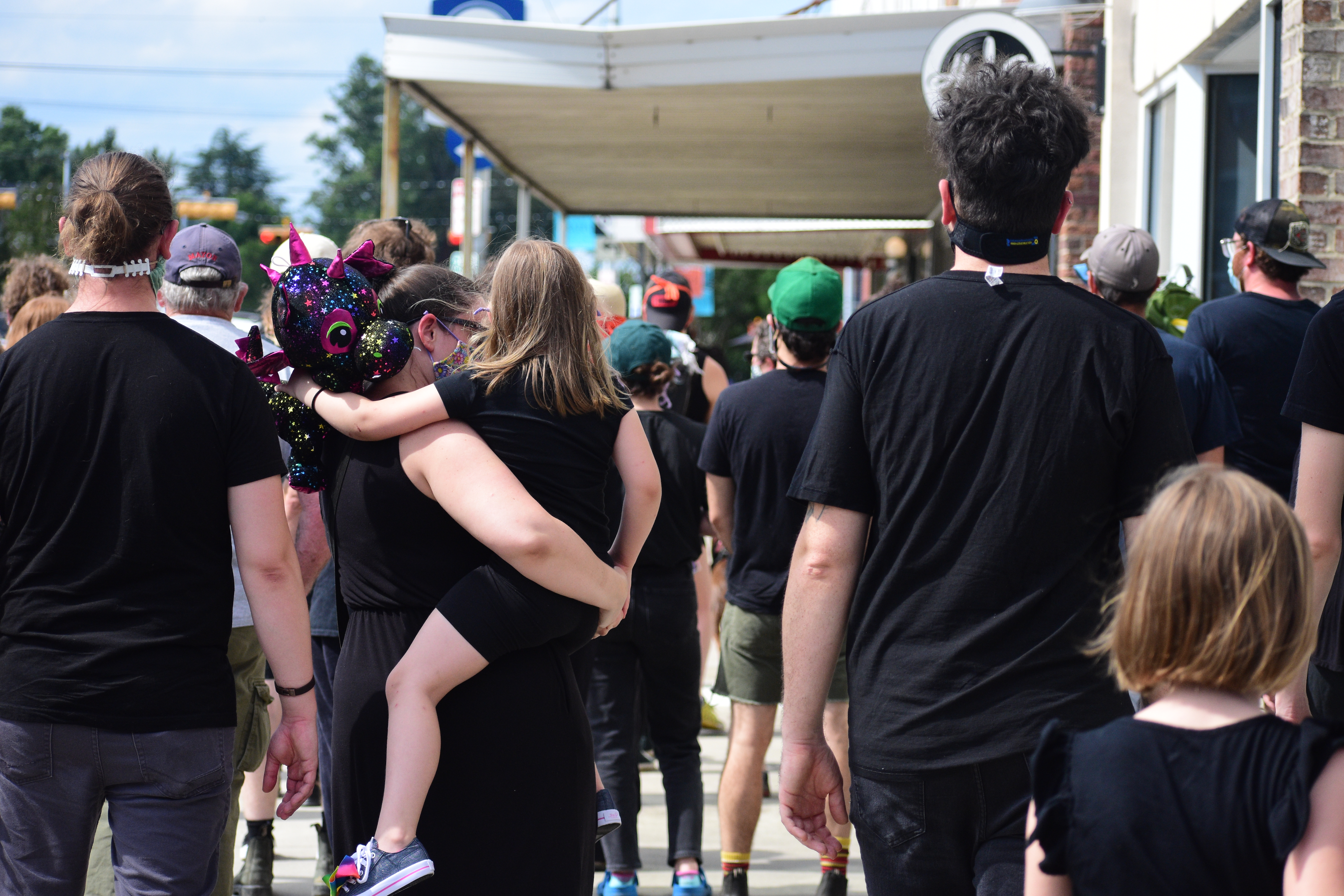
Graham on June 5

=== Greensboro ===
Hundreds of protesters were reported in downtown Greensboro on May 30. They marched from the downtown area to I-40, forcing the closure of that interstate highway. Police reported using pepper spray after some individuals threw rocks at officers. A reporter from WFMY News also reported the use of tear gas. There were reports of damage to businesses and some looting later in the evening. There were no reports of injuries. The mayor enacted a city-wide curfew on Monday, June 1. A virtual town hall has been scheduled for June 18 to discuss policing and law enforcement.

=== Greenville ===
Police estimated more than 1,000 people participated in a demonstration on Cotanche Street on May 31. The protest later turned violent, with 31 businesses damaged, 13 police and sheriff cars damaged, two small vegetation fires set, flags overturned, and damage to the courthouse. Officers were injured by rocks and bottles that were thrown. Police used tear gas to help disperse the crowd. Two individuals were arrested. The city issued a curfew for the next two nights.

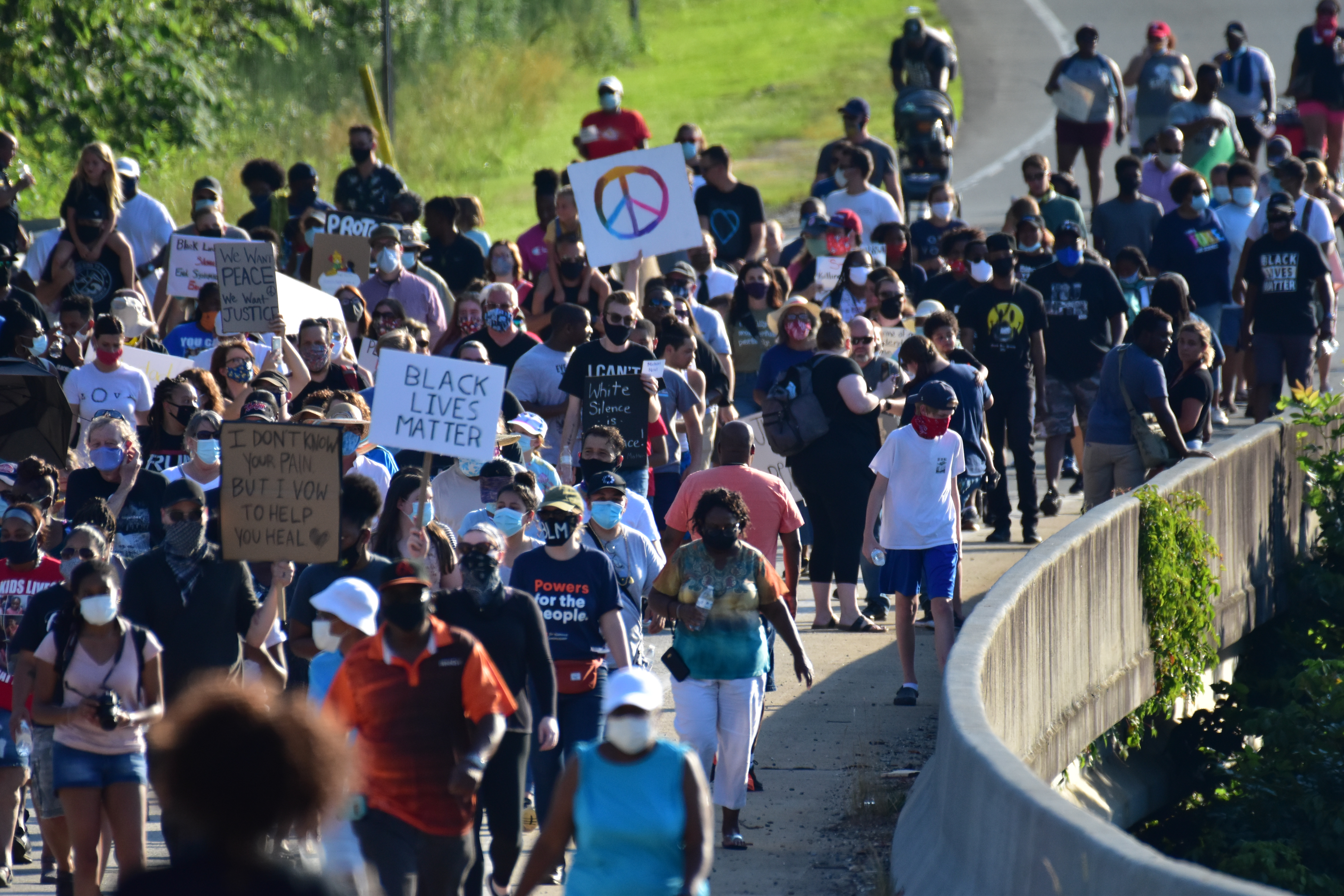
Haw River on June 7

=== High Point ===
Protesters blocked roads and broke glass on May 31. Police used tear gas to disperse the crowd. On June 1, the city issued an indefinite state of emergency and a curfew.

=== Huntersville ===
A peaceful protest took place on June 7. Congresswoman Alma Adams spoke at the rally.

=== Jacksonville ===
A silent protest was held on May 30.

=== Manteo ===
Around 500 people gathered for a demonstration near the College of The Albemarle Dare campus on June 9.

=== Morehead City ===
A series of peaceful protests took place in Morehead City from 11 am to 7 pm, starting on May 31. They initially took place on Arendell Street between 6th street and 7th street and moved to Arendell Street between 10th and 11th starting June 5. The protests were organized by Black Lives Matter – Carteret County. About 20–25 protesters attended on May 31. On June 13, the group moved back to 7th Street and Arendell Street so that about 100 people gathered on and lay facedown for 8 minutes and 46 seconds in honor of George Floyd.

=== New Bern ===
On May 30, about 40 protesters gathered at the Walmart Supercenter to protest the murder of George Floyd.

=== Newton ===
More than 100 protesters gathered at the Newton Police Department and then marched through the small town on June 1.

=== Raleigh ===
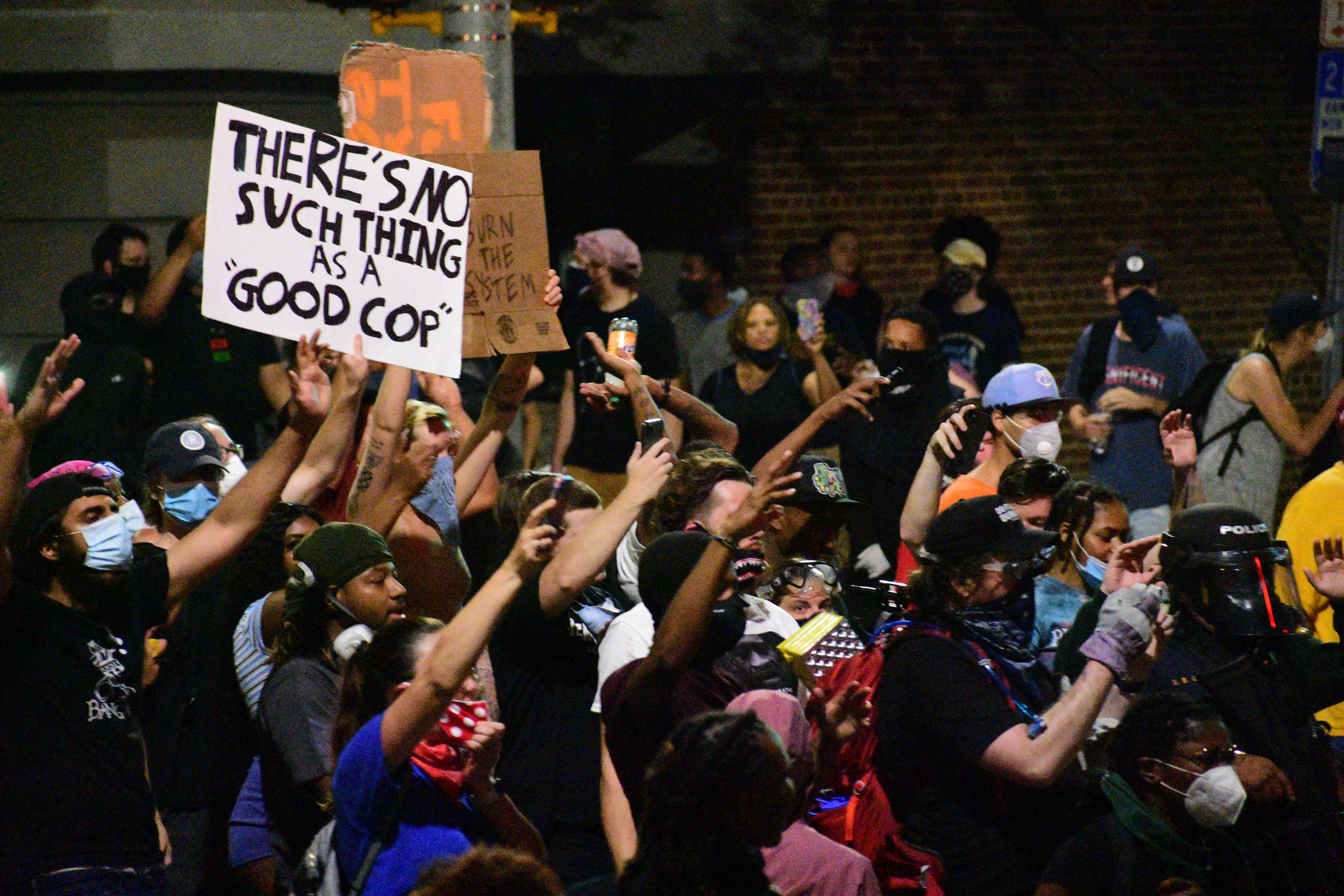
Protest in Raleigh, North Carolina on May 30

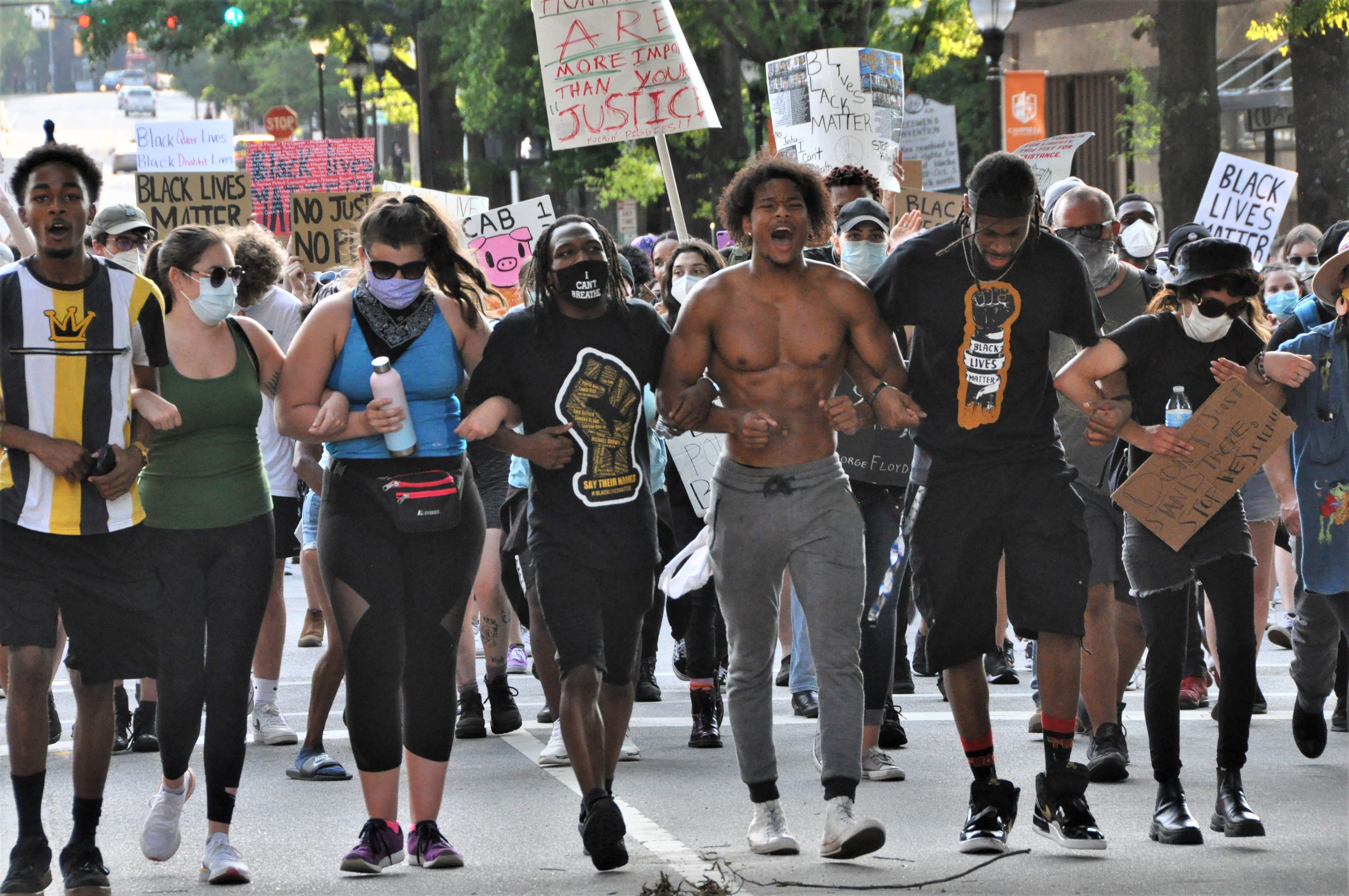
Raleigh on June 2

On May 30, a peaceful protest event named "A National Day of Action — Justice for George Floyd, Breonna Taylor, Ahmaud Arbery and lives cut short by Raleigh and Durham police departments," was organized, with crowds gathering by the Wake County Justice Center before marching up Fayetteville Street. By 6 pm, the number of protesters had grown to around 1,000 people. Around 6:45, the protests descended into chaos as people began throwing objects at Raleigh police officers, resulting in officers using tear gas and pepper spray on the crowds. Officers continued to deploy tear gas through the evening. Nearly every storefront along Fayetteville street was vandalized. From 11:30 p.m. on May 30 through 2 am. May 31, people looted and vandalized downtown businesses, including breaking windows and setting fires, causing police to deploy tear gas in heavier amounts. By 6 am, Raleigh police reported protests in the city had ceased. 12 people were arrested and five officers were sent to hospitals, including one with a broken jaw. On June 1, the mayor of Raleigh issued a city-wide curfew from 8 p.m. to 5 a.m. in an attempt to end the riots. During the curfew, employees of a gay bar who were assisting protesters and operating a first aid station in their parking lot were ordered to disperse, and when they refused, police fired flashbangs.

On June 19, Raleigh had a series of Juneteenth events including marches run by Truth Revealed Organization and Norman Adrian Wiggins School of Law of Campbell University. The night began with a march by TRO and UNITY to the North Carolina State Capitol. Representatives stated that they took cover after "fringe groups" tied ropes around the necks of statues on the Confederate Capitol Monument. A group of North Carolina State Capitol Police pepper sprayed protesters and cut the ropes, ending the attempt to topple the statues with one arrest and several police injured via being tackled by a protester, hanging from the rope, and getting pepper sprayed by other officers. Protesters were eventually successful in tearing down the Confederate statues after the North Carolina State Capitol Police were given orders to retreat. After the removal of the statues, protesters hung a statue by its neck on a streetlight. Conrad James of Living Ultra-Violet was charged with felony Inciting a riot in connection with the destruction of the statues on June 19.

=== Rocky Mount ===
On May 31, demonstrators marched in the streets, and temporarily blocked traffic at the intersection of Wesleyan Blvd and Sutter's Creek Blvd.

=== Wilmington ===
Hundreds of people gathered near historic Wilmington City Hall at 8 pm on May 31. The police arrived in fifteen minutes and by 8:45, tear gas was deployed. The mayor issued a state of emergency at 9:45. The protest was over by 10:15 with no reports of injuries or looting.

=== Wilson ===
Over 200 gathered for a protest at a Walmart store on May 31.

=== Winston-Salem ===
Hundreds of protesters marched from Bailey Park to the Winston-Salem Police Department on May 31. The crowd screamed "Mama!" while laying down in the street.
