= Charles Meeker =

American politician in North Carolina (born 1953)

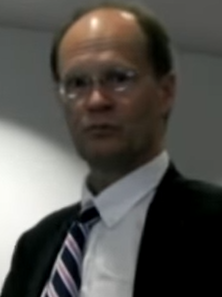

37th Mayor of Raleigh
- In office December 2001 – December 2011
- Preceded by: Paul Coble
- Succeeded by: Nancy McFarlane

Personal details
- Born: Charles Carpenter Meeker; July 27, 1950 (age 75) Washington, D.C., U.S.
- Party: Democratic
- Education: Yale University (BA); Columbia University (JD)

Charles Carpenter Meeker (born July 27, 1950) is an American politician and member of the Democratic Party who served as the 34th Mayor of Raleigh, North Carolina. He was first elected in 2001 over Republican Paul Coble, and reelected for a fifth two-year term in 2009. A fifth term tied Meeker with Avery C. Upchurch as Raleigh's longest-serving mayor.

He is the son of Leonard C. Meeker, who served as United States Ambassador to Romania from 1969 to 1973, and brother of architect Sarah Meeker Jensen

== Career ==
Meeker is a Raleigh-based lawyer whose firm focuses on local government issues, including public transportation and development. In his five terms as mayor and during previous service on the Raleigh City Council (1985–89 and 1991–95), Meeker, living and raising his family in Boylan Heights, advocated downtown redevelopment and the creation of a light rail system connecting Raleigh to Durham, Research Triangle Park, and Chapel Hill under the auspices of the Triangle Transit Authority. He also successfully pushed for the construction of a new downtown convention center and hotel, as well as the reconstruction of Fayetteville Street, a $9.33 million project to convert the pedestrian mall to an urban "main street" with outdoor dining, art galleries, and open spaces.

Meeker was a member of the Mayors Against Illegal Guns Coalition.

Meeker announced in April 2011 that he would not run for a sixth term.

He was a candidate for North Carolina Commissioner of Labor in the 2016 election, losing to Republican incumbent Cherie K. Berry.

North Carolina Commissioner of Labor Election, 2016
Party	Candidate	Votes	%
Republican	Cherie Berry (inc.)	2,487,829	55.21
Democratic	Charles Meeker	2,013,300	44.68
none	Write-ins (total)	5,006	0.11

Upon leaving office, he joined the Charlotte-based law firm of Parker Poe Adams & Bernstein LLP as a partner in the firm’s Raleigh office.

== Education ==
Charles Meeker received his BA in 1972 from Yale University and in 1975 received his JD from Columbia University.

Meeker became a member of the North Carolina bar in 1975 and a member of the District of Columbia bar in 1984.

== See also ==
- List of mayors of Raleigh, North Carolina

Political offices
Preceded by Paul Coble	Mayor of Raleigh; 2001–2011	Succeeded by Nancy McFarlane
Party political offices
Preceded by John C. Brooks	Democratic nominee for Labor Commissioner of North Carolina; 2016	Succeeded by Jessica Holmes
