= List of Order of the Long Leaf Pine recipients =

The Order of the Long Leaf Pine is granted by the Governor of North Carolina and is the state's highest civilian honor. Although the award was first given in 1964, records of recipients were not kept until 1983. Following is a partial list of its recipients.

Recipient	Award year	Notability	Ref.
1981–82 North Carolina Tar Heels men's basketball team	1982	1982 NCAA Division I men's basketball tournament National Champions; Atlantic Coast Conference Tournament Champions and Regular Season Co-champions	
Charles W. Albertson		North Carolina Senate	
Elreta Alexander-Ralston	1995	Trial attorney and North Carolina District Court Judge	
Gordon P. Allen	2010	North Carolina Senate	
Jo Allen	2024	President of Meredith College	
American Red Cross	1982	Humanitarian organization	
Maya Angelou	1992	Poet, author, and civil rights activist	
Balsam Range	2015	Bluegrass band	
William Barber II	2010	Minister and political activist	
Harry Belafonte		Calypso singer and actor	
Jack Betts	2006	Journalist and associate editor of The Charlotte Observer	
Dan Blue	2003	Speaker of the North Carolina House of Representatives and North Carolina Senate	
Blue Angels	2003	United States Navy flight demonstration squadron	
John Baker	1971, 1987, 2004	Professional football player and Wake County Sheriff	
George W. BonDurant	2009	Founder and first president of Atlanta Christian College and Mid-Atlantic Christian University	
Charlie Boney	2014	Architect	
Rod Brind'Amour	2024	Professional hockey player and coach	
Watson Brown	2014	Photographer	
Jim Broyhill	1992	United States House of Representatives and United States Senate	
Peter S. Brunstetter	2016	North Carolina Senate	
Wanda G. Bryant	1980	Associate judge on the North Carolina Court of Appeals	
Shirley Caesar	1979, 1995, 2016	Grammy Awards winning Gospel singer	
Isabella Cannon	1999	First female Mayor of Raleigh, North Carolina	
Rod Carew	1984	Baseball player and coach	
Fred Chappell	2003	North Carolina Poet Laureate	
Richard Childress	1994	NASCAR race car driver and businessman	
Shirley Chisholm		First Black woman to be elected to the United States Congress	
Janice Cole	2001	United States Attorney for the United States District Court for the Eastern District of North Carolina	
Linda Combs	2022	Comptroller of the Office of Management and Budget	
Bonnie Ethel Cone	2003	Founder of the University of North Carolina at Charlotte	
Janet Cowell	2017	North Carolina State Treasurer and North Carolina Senate	
David Crabtree	2022	Journalist and lead anchor of WRAL-TV	
Joan Crawford		Actress	
Paul R. Cunningham	2016	Dean of The Brody School of Medicine at East Carolina University	
Margaret Currin	2015	First woman United States Attorney in North Carolina	
Charlie Daniels	1984	Singer, musician, and songwriter	
Frank A. Daniels Jr.	1995	Publisher of The News and Observer	
Chuck Davis	2007	Dancer	
Crash Davis	1979	Minor League Baseball player	
Claude DeBruhl	1981	North Carolina House of Representatives and veterans advocate	
Ruby Dee	2000	Actress	
Walter Dellinger	2010	Acting United States Solicitor General and law professor	
Walter DeVries	1998	Political consultant and founder of the North Carolina Institute of Political Leadership	
James Dodson	2012	Sports writer	
Phil Donahue	1982	Talk show host and writer	
Philip L. Dubois	2020	President of the University of Wyoming and chancellor of the University of North Carolina at Charlotte	
Dale Earnhardt	1994	NASCAR stock car racing driver and racing team owner	
Dale Earnhardt Jr.	2018	NASCAR stock car racing driver, team owner, and broadcaster	
Thereasea Elder	2001	First African American public health nurse in Charlotte, North Carolina	
Karl Eikenberry	2016	United States Army lieutenant general and former U.S. Ambassador to Afghanistan	
Myrlie Evers-Williams	1995	Civil rights activist	
S. Scott Ferebee Jr.	2001	Architect	
Tom Fetzer	1992	Mayor of Raleigh, North Carolina and chairman of the North Carolina Republican Party	
Allison Fisher	2026	Professional billiards and snooker player	
Gerald Ford		President of the United States	
John Hope Franklin	1995	Historian and writer	
William C. Friday	2004	Head of the University of North Carolina system from 1956 to 1986	
Shirley Fulton	2011	First African American female judge in the North Carolina Superior Court	
Roman Gabriel	1988	Professional football player	
Norman C. Gaddis	2023	United States Air Force Brigadier General	
Clarence Gaines	1979, 1988, 1993	Mens basketball coach at Winston-Salem State University	
Harvey Gantt	1984	Architect and the first black Mayor of Charlotte, North Carolina	
John Glenn	1979	NASA astronaut and United States Senate	
Danny Glover	2003	Actor	
Jeff Gordon	2016	NASCAR stock car racing driver and stock car racing executive	
Tipper Gore	1997	Second Lady of the United States and co-founder of the Parents Music Resource Center	
Billy Graham	1996	Evangelist, Southern Baptist minister, and civil rights advocate	
Franklin Graham	2015	Christian Evangelist and missionary	
William A. Griffin	2010	Preacher and president of Mid-Atlantic Christian University	
Andy Griffith	2012	Actor	
Philip F. Gura	2019	Cultural historian and academic	
Lloyd V. Hackley	1992	Chancellor of Fayetteville State University and president of the North Carolina Community College System	
Bob Hall	2017	Executive Director of Democracy North Carolina	
Mia Hamm	1995	Professional soccer player	
Bob Harris	2017	Sportscaster	
Fletcher L. Hartsell Jr.	1992	North Carolina Senate	
Nathan O. Hatch	2021	President of Wake Forest University	
Merlin Hay, 24th Earl of Erroll	1986	Earl of Erroll	
Rick Hendrick	1996	NASCAR racing driver and team owner	
George M. Holmes	1992	North Carolina House of Representatives	
James Holshouser	1983	Governor of North Carolina	
Jonathan Howes	1997	Secretary, North Carolina Department of Environment and Natural Resources	
Engelbert Humperdink		Pop singer	
Catfish Hunter		Professional baseball player	
William E. Ingram Jr.	1995	Lieutenant General and director of the Army National Guard	
Jesse Jackson	1982	Civil rights activist and shadow congressperson for Washington, D.C.	
J. Charles Jennette	2020	Nephropathologist, academic, and author	
George Jessel	1979	Vaudeville performer and actor	
Junior Johnson	1984	NASCAR stock car racing driver and team owner	
George Jones	1970	Country musician	
Wilbur D. Jones Jr.	2023	Author, military historian, and preservationist	
Michael Jordan	1985	College and professional basketball player	
Alexander Julian	1980	Fashion designer	
Ralph Ketner	2015	Founder of Food Lion	
Jean-Claude Killy		Olympic Alpine skier	
Coretta Scott King	2002	Civil rights leader and wife of Martin Luther King Jr.	
Earline Heath King	2003	Sculptor	
Fred Kirby	1980	Singer-songwriter	
Mike Krzyzewski	2022	College basketball coach	
I. Beverly Lake Jr.	2006	Chief justice of the North Carolina Supreme Court	
Bill Leslie	2018	News anchor for WRAL-TV and New-age music recording artist	
William Ivey Long	2001	Costume designer	
Betty Lynn	2016	Actress	
Doug Marlette	2007	Pulitzer Prize-winning editorial cartoonist	
John C. Martin	2014	Chief Judge of the North Carolina Court of Appeals	
David T. McCoy	2000	N.C. State Controller and Secretary of the North Carolina Department of Transportation	
Scotty McCreery	2017	Country music singer	
Mike McIntyre	2014	U.S. House of Representatives	
Kenneth Merritt		Parachutist	
Mary Lee Mills		Nurse	
Ronnie Milsap	1984	Country music singer	
Michael A. Milton	2018	Minister, theologian, and singer-songwriter	
Burley Mitchell	1992	Chief Justice of the North Carolina Supreme Court	
Jerry Moore	2012	Football player and coach	
Hugh Morton	1984	Photographer and conservationist who developed Grandfather Mountain	
Lynn Morton	2022	President of Warren Wilson College	
Wendell H. Murphy	1992	North Carolina House of Representatives and North Carolina Senate	
Bess Myerson	1979	Miss America, model, and television actress	
Hal Needham	1983	Stunt performer and film director	
Leslie Nielsen		Actor	
Virginia Newell	2017	Mathematics educator, author, and politician	
Edward Francis North, Earl of Guilford	1982	9th Earl of Guilford	
Margaret Nygard	1995	Educator and conservationist	
Carmen Hooker Odom	2007	Secretary of the North Carolina Department of Health and Human Services	
Benny Parsons	2007	NASCAR driver and pit reporter	
Itzhak Perlman	1983	Violinist	
Gaylord Perry		Professional baseball player	
Richard Petty	1988	NASCAR stock car racing driver	
Gary Player	1983	Professional golfer	
Sidney Poitier	1993	Actor and diplomat	
Art Pope	1992	North Carolina House of Representatives and businessman	
Colin Powell	1993	United States secretary of state	
Marc Pruett	2015	Bluegrass banjo player	
Nido Qubein	2005	Businessman and motivational speaker	
André Raphel	2001	Conductor, Boston Symphony Orchestra	
James E. Ramsey	2012	Speaker of the North Carolina House of Representatives	
Robert Redford	1984	Actor and filmmaker	
Lee H. Roberts	2016	13th chancellor of the University of North Carolina at Chapel Hill.	
John Shelton Reed	2023	Sociologist, essayist, and author	
William Rehnquist	1994	Chief Justice of the United States	
Gene Roberts	2015	National and executive editor of The New York Times	
Kenny Rogers	1982	Country music singer and songwriter	
Thomas Warren Ross	1999	President of the University of North Carolina system	
Robert W. Scott	1971	Governor of North Carolina	
Earl Scruggs	1984	Bluegrass musician	
Hugh Shelton		Chairman of the Joint Chiefs of Staff	
Claude Sitton	1985	The New York Times reporter and editor, The News & Observer editor	
Enos Slaughter	1983	Professional baseball player	
Arthur "Guitar Boogie" Smith	1984	Composer, musician, and record producer	
Dean Smith	1988	College basketball coach	
James Smith	1993, 1995	Boxer and World Boxing Association heavyweight champion	
Mike Sprayberry	1998	North Carolina Emergency management director	
Ted G. Stone	1999	Evangelist	
Curtis Strange	1991	Professional golfer	
Ben C. Sutton Jr.	2014	Investor, philanthropist, and the founder of Teall Capital	
Wendell Tabb	2022	Theater teacher	
Bob Timberlake	2006	Artist	
Patricia Timmons-Goodson	1999, 2005	North Carolina Supreme Court and federal judge for the United States District Court for the Eastern District of North Carolina	
Randy Travis	1987	Country music and gospel music singer	
Lanny Wadkins	1988	Professional golfer	
George Walker	1997	Classical composer and the first African American to win the Pulitzer Prize for Music	
Jerry M. Wallace	2015	President of Campbell University	
Rusty Wallace	2005	NASCAR racing driver	
Edith D. Warren	2012	North Carolina General Assembly	
Robert D. Warren Sr.	2005	North Carolina Senate	
Doc Watson	1999	Grammy Awards winning bluegrass singer and songwriter	
Norman Adrian Wiggins	1976, 1980, 1996, 1998	President of Campbell University	
Laura I. Wiley	2016	North Carolina House of Representatives	
Harvey D. Williams	1996	U.S. Army major general and first African-American commander of Fort Myer	
Ted Williams	1981	Professional baseball player	
Tennessee Williams	1981	Playwright and screenwriter	
Oprah Winfrey	1987	Talk show host, actress, producer, and author	
Leslie Winner	1999	North Carolina Senate and general counsel and vice president for the University of North Carolina system	
Jeremiah Wolfe	2017	Cherokee stonecutter, stickball caller, and storyteller	
Ira David Wood III	1994	Actor, playwright, and executive director of Theatre in the Park	
James Worthy	1985	College and professional basketball player	
Aldona Wos	2015	United States Ambassador to Estonia and Secretary of the North Carolina Department of Health and Human Services	
Tammy Wynette	1970	Country music singer	
Andrew Young	2002	Civil rights activist, U.S. Congressman, U.S. Ambassador to the United Nations, and the Mayor of Atlanta	
