= Sprayberry =

Sprayberry is a surname. Notable people with the surname include:

- Dylan Sprayberry (born 1998), American actor
- Ellery Sprayberry (born 2000), American actress and voice over artist
- James M. Sprayberry (born 1947), United States Army officer
- Mike Sprayberry, American emergency manager
