= West Charlotte High School =

American public school in North Carolina

Location
- 2219 Senior Drive; Charlotte, North Carolina 28216; United States; 35°15′58″N 80°51′34″W

Information
- Type: Public
- Established: 1938 (88 years ago)
- School district: Charlotte-Mecklenburg Schools
- CEEB code: 340700
- Principal: Orlando Robinson
- Teaching staff: 102.60 (FTE)
- Grades: 9–12
- Enrollment: 1,674 (2023–2024)
- Student to teacher ratio: 16.32
- Colors: Maroon and gold
- Athletics: NCHSAA 8A
- Athletics conference: Meck Power Six 7A/8A
- Nickname: Mighty Lions
- Website: westcharlottehs.cmsk12.org

West Charlotte High School (also called Dub-C or WC) is a comprehensive high school in west Charlotte, near Beatties Ford Road in Charlotte, North Carolina. It is state-funded.

== History ==
West Charlotte High School was founded in 1938. The original campus became Northwest School of the Arts. It moved to its current location in 1954. West Charlotte is one of the few high schools still in existence whose students were African American during the era of segregation.

During the next three decades, the school became the pride of the community, and students won statewide competitions, with a strong connection between students and parents.

Beginning in the late 1960s, Swann v. Charlotte-Mecklenburg Board of Education ruled that cities had to desegregate their schools through busing, which created riots at many schools in the district, including at West Charlotte, as students from West Mecklenburg, Harding, Garinger, North Mecklenburg and Myers Park were bused to the school, starting in the fall of 1970. Over time, though, the school became nationally recognized as a model for student integration, with students and teachers coming from as far as Boston to view the success of the school. For the next 20 years, West Charlotte remained integrated until a series of court decisions stated that integration in Charlotte was a success and that busing was no longer needed.

On June 8, 2022, the current campus consisting of several buildings was closed and demolished with the current building completed next door. The former location became parking lots and athletic fields.

== IB Diploma Programme ==
Since April 2005, West Charlotte has been an International Baccalaureate (IB) World School offering the IB Diploma Programme.

The IB Diploma Programme is an academically challenging and balanced program of education with final examinations that prepares students, ages 16 to 19, for higher education and life beyond. The program is taught over two years and has gained recognition from universities worldwide.

IB Diploma Programme students study six courses at higher level or standard level. Students select one subject from each of the following groups:

- Group 1: Language A1
- Group 2: Second Language
- Group 3: Individuals and societies
- Group 4: Experimental sciences
- Group 5: Mathematics and computer science
- Group 6: The arts

== Students Against Violence Everywhere (SAVE) ==
In 1989, a West Charlotte student named Alex Orange was killed while trying to break up a fight at a party. His grieving classmates gathered and vowed to organize against violence in Alex's memory. The group formed Students Against Violence Everywhere (SAVE), with the vision that all students would be able to attend a school that is safe, secure, free of fear, and conducive to learning. Their signature color is orange, a reflection of Alex's surname.

SAVE members participated in local non-violence marches and the Carolina Carrousel Parade. During the school year, they visit elementary and junior high school, as well as television and radio shows, to perform skits showing how to act out non-violent solutions to problems.

Due to SAVE's efforts, there was a decrease in the number of violent incidents, weapons found in the school and the expulsion rate of students. This sparked an increase of chapters being started at other local high schools.

In 1992, SAVE received the 875th Daily Point of Light award by President George H.W. Bush. The award honors individuals and volunteer groups that have made a commitment to connect Americans through service to help meet critical needs in their communities.

Over almost 30 years, SAVE has grown from one chapter in Charlotte, North Carolina, to over 1,800 SAVE chapters with more than 200,000 members across the U.S. Today, SAVE serves youth in elementary schools, middle schools, high schools, colleges, and community youth-serving organizations in 46 states and several other countries. SAVE is coordinated by a North Carolina-based 501(c)(3) nonprofit organization, the National Association of Students Against Violence Everywhere, and it is still led by students, for students.

== Performance ==
Due to low scores on standardized testing, it was feared the school would be closed. During the 2006–2007 school year, WC had the third worst performance in Mecklenburg County—surpassed only by Harding and Independence. The school has remained open, in part because of the response of its active alumni.

In 2007, pastors in the Charlotte area, officials at Johnson C. Smith University, and city council member and future Charlotte mayor Anthony Foxx formed the West Charlotte Mentoring Coalition, a collaborative effort to eliminate the 50% drop-out rate by providing mentoring and tutoring support for ninth graders at West Charlotte High School.

The group placed each of the 550 incoming freshmen with a mentor. West Charlotte principal Shelton Jeffries said the graduation rate at his school is a serious concern. He believes the work of the coalition will be powerful in reversing those trends by positively influencing the lives of young people.

== Extracurricular activities ==
West Charlotte offers many extracurricular activities to encourage students' involvement in the school's community outside of the normal classroom setting. Those activities include:

=== Arts ===
- Band
- Chorus
- Dance
- Drawing/Painting
- Photography

=== Sports ===
- Basketball
- Baseball
- Cheerleading
- Football
- Soccer
- Softball
- Swimming
- Tennis
- Track and Field
- Volleyball
- Wrestling

== Athletics ==
West Charlotte is affiliated with the North Carolina High School Athletic Association (NCHSAA) and is classified as an 8A school. It is a part of the Meck Power Six 7A/8A Conference. Their team name is the "Lions" with their school colors being maroon and gold. The marching band is one of the best known extracurricular activities at West Charlotte. They have performed at a bowl game every year since 2004, when they debuted at the Sugar Bowl. WC's stadium is called Jack Martin Stadium.

West Charlotte's main rivals are West Mecklenburg High School and Harding University High School.

=== State Championships ===
- Men's Basketball: 1963, 1966, 1986, 1991, 1992, 1999, 2011, 2022, 2026
- Women's Basketball: 2009
- Football: 1954, 1995, 2024
- Men's Indoor Track & Field: 1999, 2005
- Men's Outdoor Track & Field: 1950, 1951, 1952, 1995, 1999, 2003
- Volleyball: 1997, 2000

== Notable alumni ==
- Kelly Alexander – politician
- Keith Belton – former NFL fullback
- Isaiah Blackmon – professional basketball player
- Calvin Brock – former professional boxer, competed at the 2000 Summer Olympics
- Thomas Harold "Junior" Burrough – former NBA player
- Mo Collins – former NFL offensive lineman
- Thereasea Elder – first African American public health nurse in Charlotte, North Carolina
- Anthony Foxx – lawyer, politician, and 54th Mayor of Charlotte
- Justin Gray – professional basketball player
- Trent Guy – former NFL and CFL player
- Pep Hamilton – college football and NFL coach
- Andrew Jordan – NFL tight end
- Goo Kennedy – former NBA player
- Jon Lindsay – recording artist
- Grier Martin – member of the North Carolina General Assembly representing the state's 34th House district
- Jeff McInnis – UNC basketball alumnus and former NBA player
- Kennedy Meeks – professional basketball player and 2017 NCAA champion with North Carolina
- Pettis Norman – NFL tight end
- Maureen O'Boyle – television reporter and news anchor, previously on A Current Affair and Extra
- Wali Rainer – NFL linebacker
- Ruth Samuelson – member of the North Carolina General Assembly representing the state's 104th House district
- Hollywood Smothers – college football running back for the NC State Wolfpack
- Mike Sprayberry – director of the Department of Emergency Management, North Carolina
- David S. Taylor – business executive
- Anne Tompkins – served as the United States Attorney for the United States District Court for the Western District of North Carolina
- Devontez Walker – NFL wide receiver for the Baltimore Ravens
- Dave Waymer – NFL safety and 1987 Pro Bowl selection
- Patrick Williams – basketball player for the Chicago Bulls
- Steve Wilks – former NFL defensive coordinator for the San Francisco 49ers
- Everett Withers – college football and NFL coach
