= World War II Heritage City =

World War II Heritage City (officially American World War II Heritage City) is an honorary designation applied by National Park Service of the United States government to an American city or region in recognition of its contributions to the war effort of World War II and its continuing work to preserve its military history.

== History ==
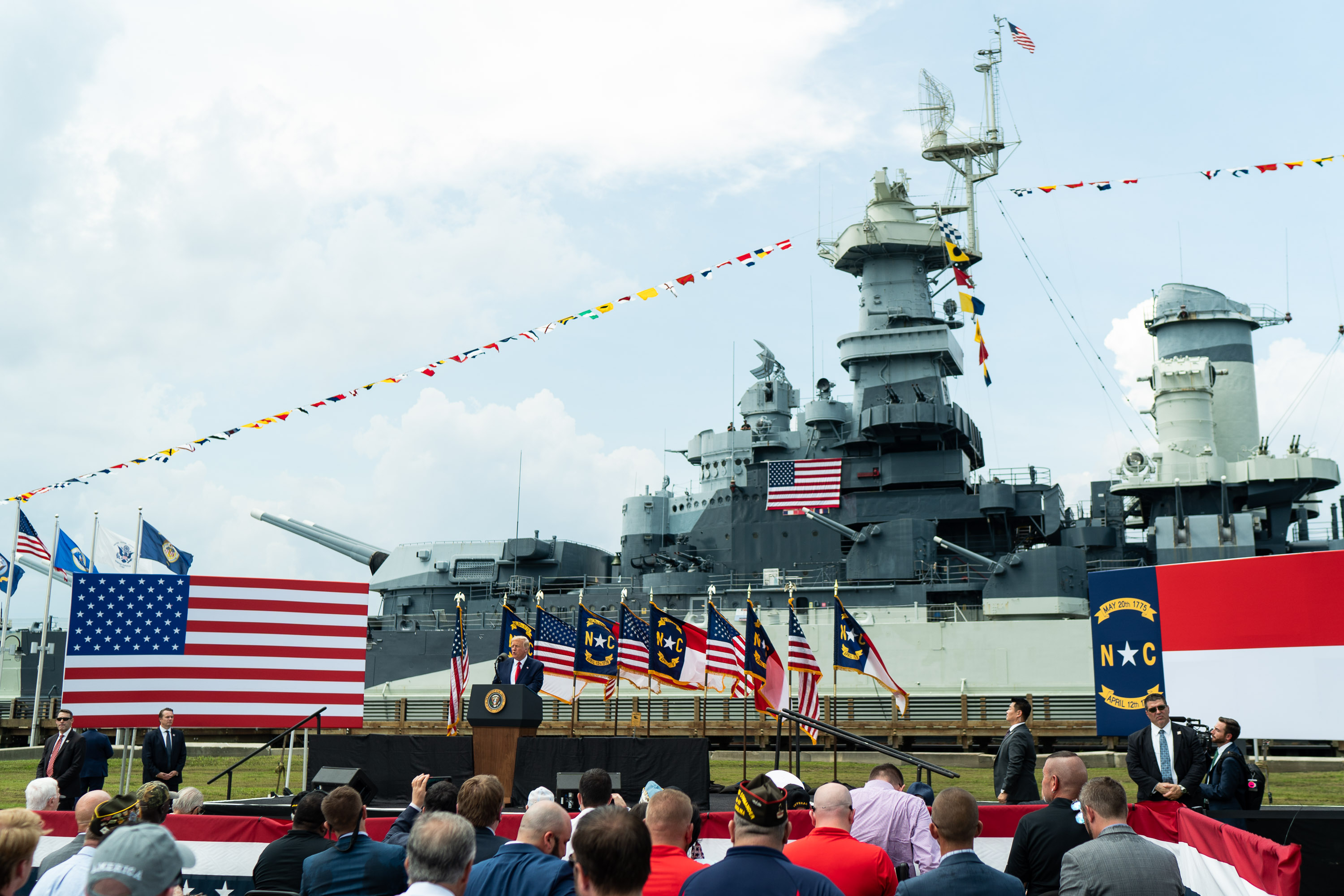
Donald Trump speaks at the designation of Wilmington, North Carolina as the first World War II Heritage City in September 2020.

The idea for the World War II Heritage City program was originated by Wilbur D. Jones Jr., a retired United States Navy captain and military historian, in about 2008. The designation was made law by an act sponsored by Senator Thom Tillis and Representative David Rouzer, and signed into law by President Donald Trump in 2019 as Public Law 116–9.

In September 2020, Wilmington, North Carolina, was designated the first World War II Heritage City.

== Criteria ==
Any city credited with a major contribution to the American war effort during World War II and which, since the end of hostilities, has actively endeavored to preserve its military legacy can be designated a World War II Heritage City. The Secretary of the Interior is authorized to designate cities. No more than one such city in any single state or territory can be named. Other jurisdictions, such as counties, towns, or townships are eligible.

== List of Heritage Cities ==
- Foley, Alabama
- Tempe, Arizona
- Calhoun and Ouachita counties, Arkansas
- Richmond, California
- East Hartford, Connecticut
- Wilmington, Delaware
- Pensacola and Escambia County, Florida
- Savannah and Chatham County, Georgia
- Evansville, Indiana
- Waterloo, Iowa
- Wichita, Kansas
- New Orleans, Louisiana
- Baltimore County, Maryland
- Springfield, Massachusetts
- Plymouth Township, Michigan
- Pascagoula, Mississippi
- Johnson County and Warrensburg, Missouri
- Lewistown, Montana
- Hastings, Nebraska
- Boulder City and Henderson, Nevada
- Paterson, New Jersey
- Los Alamos County, New Mexico
- Yonkers, New York
- Wilmington, North Carolina
- Valley City, North Dakota
- Municipality of Tinian & Aguiguan, Northern Mariana Islands
- Dayton and Montgomery County, Ohio
- Ponca City and Kay County, Oklahoma
- Pittsburgh, Pennsylvania
- North Kingstown, Rhode Island
- Sumter city and Sumter County, South Carolina
- Oak Ridge, Tennessee
- South Texas Bend area and Corpus Christi, Texas
- Ogden, Utah
- Bedford County, Virginia
- Tri-Cities (Kennewick, Pasco, Richland and West Richland), Washington
- Manitowoc, Wisconsin
- Casper and Natrona County, Wyoming

== See also ==
- Hero City (Soviet Union)
