= Pep Hamilton =

American football player and coach (born 1974)

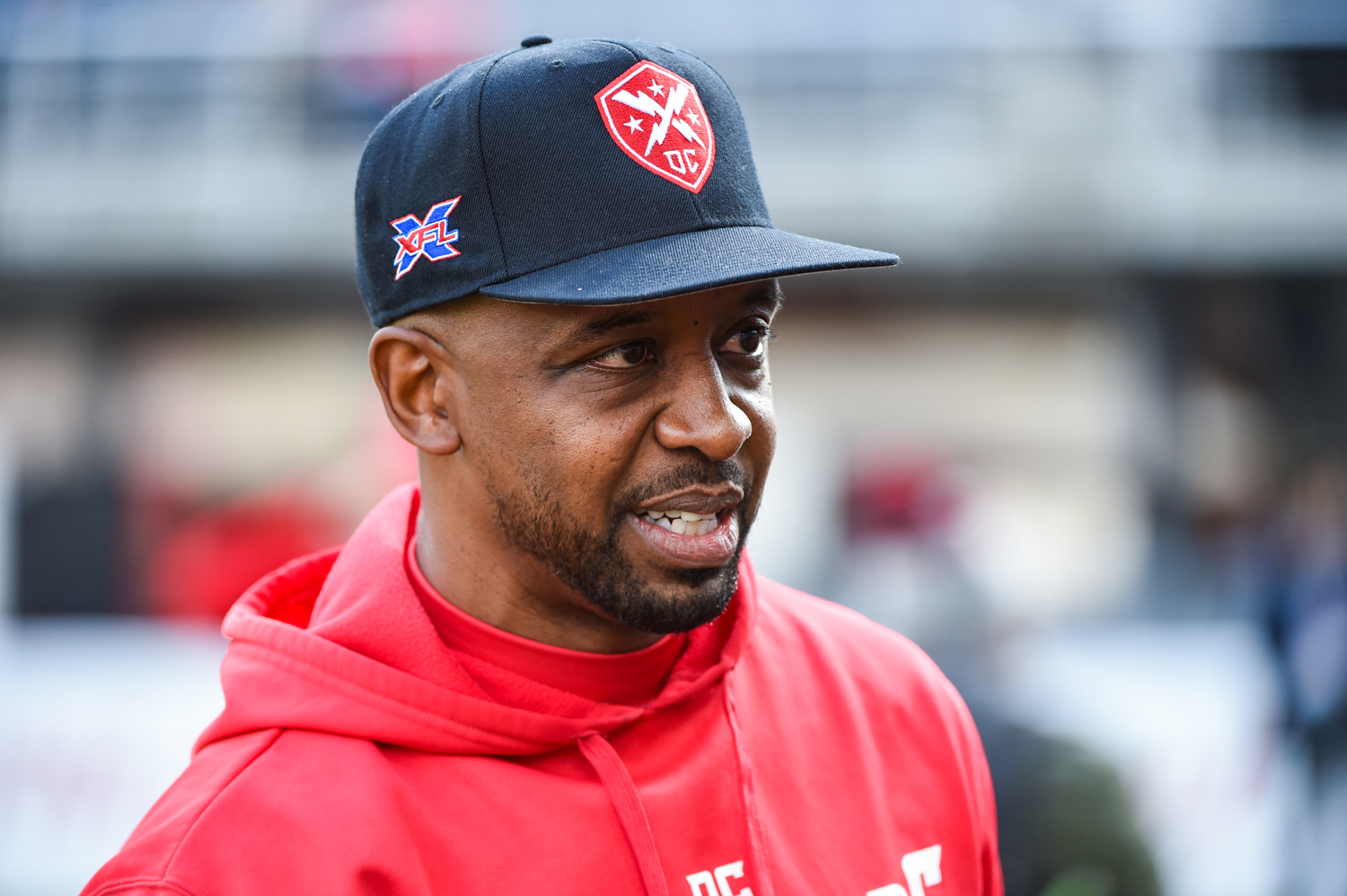
- Hamilton as head coach of the DC Defenders in 2020

Maryland Terrapins
- Title: Senior advisor

Personal information
- Born: September 19, 1974 (age 52); Charlotte, North Carolina, U.S.

Career information
- High school: West Charlotte
- College: Howard (1993–1996)

Career history
- Howard (1997–2001) Quarterbacks coach; Howard (1999–2001) Offensive coordinator; New York Jets (2003) Offensive quality control coach; New York Jets (2004) Quarterbacks coach; New York Jets (2005) Wide receivers coach; San Francisco 49ers (2006) Quarterbacks coach; Chicago Bears (2007–2009) Quarterbacks coach; Stanford (2010) Wide receivers coach; Stanford (2011–2012) Offensive coordinator & quarterbacks coach; Indianapolis Colts (2013–2015) Offensive coordinator; Cleveland Browns (2016) Assistant head coach & quarterbacks coach; Michigan (2017–2018) Assistant head coach & passing game coordinator; DC Defenders (2020) Head coach & general manager; Los Angeles Chargers (2020) Quarterbacks coach; Houston Texans (2021) Passing game coordinator & quarterbacks coach; Houston Texans (2022) Offensive coordinator; Maryland (2025) Offensive coordinator & quarterbacks coach; Maryland (2026–present) Senior advisor

Head coaching record
- Regular season: XFL: 3–2 (.600)
- Coaching profile at Pro Football Reference

Alfonza "Pep" Hamilton (born September 19, 1974) is an American football coach who currently serves as a senior advisor for the Maryland Terrapins. He was previously the head coach and general manager of the DC Defenders of the XFL, the quarterbacks coach for the Los Angeles Chargers, and the offensive coordinator for the Houston Texans of the National Football League (NFL).

== Playing career ==
=== College ===
A native of Charlotte, North Carolina who graduated from West Charlotte High School, Hamilton played quarterback from 1993 to 1996 at Howard University. While at Howard, Hamilton earned the team's scholar-athlete award in 1995 and 1996.

== Coaching career ==
=== Early career ===
Hamilton started his coaching career at Howard University, where he served as the team's quarterbacks coach before becoming the team's offensive coordinator. Hamilton coached in the National Football League for the New York Jets and San Francisco 49ers before taking a position as quarterbacks coach for the Chicago Bears on March 5, 2007.

=== College coaching ===
In 2010, Hamilton was hired by the University of New Mexico Lobos after Tee Martin left for the Kentucky Wildcats and was named co-offensive coordinator and wide receivers coach. However, after Ron Turner left Stanford for the Indianapolis Colts, Hamilton left New Mexico before the start of the season to be the wide receivers coach at Stanford. In 2011, he was promoted to offensive coordinator under new head coach David Shaw.

=== Indianapolis Colts ===
In 2013, Hamilton was named as the new offensive coordinator of the Indianapolis Colts, after former OC Bruce Arians left to become the head coach of the Arizona Cardinals. The move reunited Hamilton with former Stanford starting quarterback Andrew Luck, tight end Coby Fleener, and wide receiver Griff Whalen. Hamilton turned down an offer to become the offensive coordinator of the Virginia Tech Hokies, citing a desire to be reunited with his former protege Andrew Luck.

On December 30, 2014, the Oakland Raiders interviewed Hamilton concerning their coaching vacancy, but opted to hire Jack Del Rio.

On November 3, 2015, the Colts fired Hamilton.

=== Cleveland Browns ===
In January 2016, Hamilton was named as the associate head coach and quarterbacks coach for the Cleveland Browns.

=== Michigan Wolverines ===
In 2017, Hamilton was signed by the Wolverines to a four-year $4.25m contract.

=== DC Defenders ===
In February 2019, Hamilton joined the XFL's DC Defenders to be their head coach and general manager for the 2020 XFL season.

=== Los Angeles Chargers ===
In April 2020, Hamilton joined the Los Angeles Chargers to be their quarterbacks coach for the 2020 NFL season. He was an integral part of the success of Justin Herbert who won the offensive rookie of the year award.

=== Houston Texans ===
On March 10, 2021, Hamilton was hired by the Houston Texans as their passing game coordinator and quarterbacks coach under head coach David Culley. On February 7, 2022, Hamilton was promoted to offensive coordinator. After the season, he was not retained.

=== Maryland ===
On February 4, 2025, Hamilton was hired to serve as the offensive coordinator for the Maryland Terrapins. At the end of the 2025, Hamilton shifted into an advisor role for Maryland.

== Head coaching record ==
=== XFL ===
Team	Year	Regular season					Postseason			
Team	Year	Won	Lost	Ties	Win %	Finish	Won	Lost	Win %	Result
DC	2020	3	2	0	.600	TBD	0	0	.000	TBD
Total		3	2	0	.600		0	0	.000	
