= Nando (media company) =

Nando (from "News and Observer") was an American internet news service and Internet service provider (ISP), founded in 1993 by the publishers of The News & Observer newspaper in Raleigh, North Carolina. Initially it relied on access via bulletin board technology. One of the first 24-hour news websites, the Nando Times, was launched in 1994, providing edited information from major news agencies that had not then developed their own websites.

The parent corporation was sold in 1995 to the California-based McClatchy newspaper chain. The dial-up ISP business was closed down, and the Nando Times pages were discontinued in 2003. The editorial staff continued to process wire stories, which fed other McClatchy outlets. The Nando brand itself was abandoned in 2005 in favor of the name McClatchy Interactive.

== Inception ==
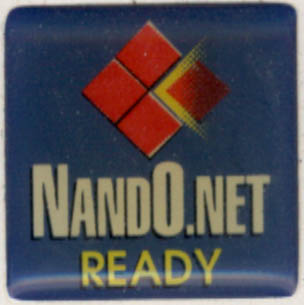
Nando PC badge

Nando was produced by the New Media division of The News & Observer newspaper in Raleigh, North Carolina. In 1993 George Schlukbier, a news librarian from McClatchy Newspapers, became the first New Media Director; he was hired by Frank Daniels III, editor of the daily paper, to build this new division. In this effort to prove that the Internet was a better partner for newspapers than AOL or Prodigy, the core developers were Dave Livingston (nicknamed "Sleepy Squirrel"), Charles Hall, James Calloway, Alfred Filler, Fraser Van Asch, "Zonker" Harris, Mike Emmett and Schlukbier. This team built a GUI to the Internet using The Major BBS as a front end, extended to use traditional Internet applications such as Gopher, WAIS, Lynx and Telnet. With this ad-hoc system, Nando.net provided classified news and became a commercial ISP in North Carolina's Research Triangle area, which encompasses Raleigh, Durham, Cary and Chapel Hill.

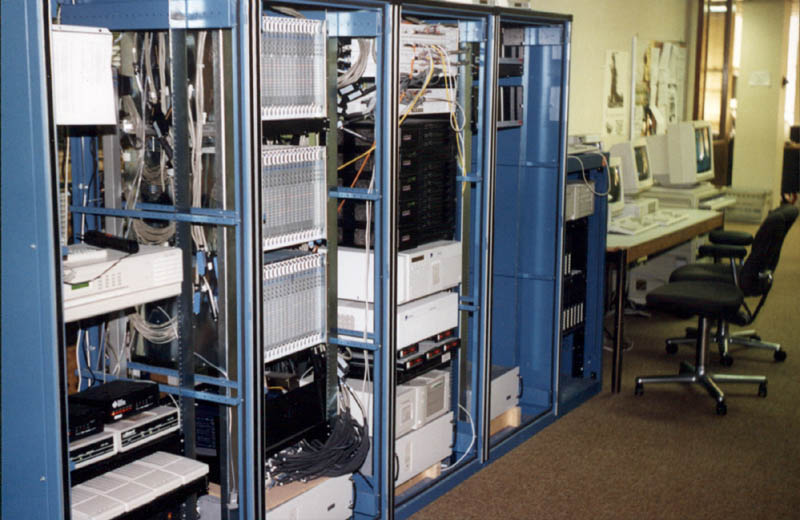
Nando 1993 - racks not full yet

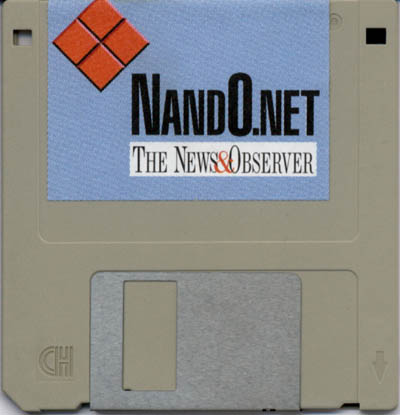
Nando floppy with free software

The News & Observer newspaper's nickname, "The N&O," gave the site its name, presented online as NandO or Nando, apparently after the newspaper's News Library staff pointed out that the ampersand would create difficulties in database construction and so coined the title of NandO, according to Teresa Leonard, chief librarian of The News & Observer. The electronic edition went far beyond the original content of the North Carolina paper, which eventually was shifted to a different Web address (at http://newsobserver.com) maintained by a separate staff.

== 'LHP' and 'CBGL' ==
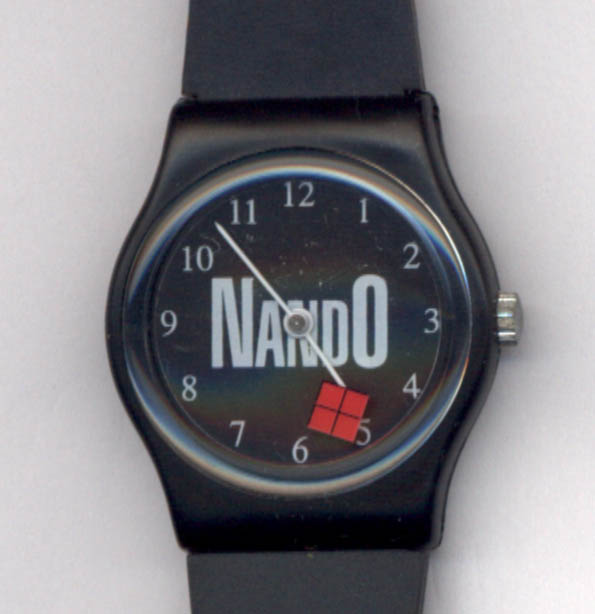
Christmas gift to Nando staff

The leaders of this emerging phenomenon gave themselves imaginative titles, a bit of whimsy that set a wacky, free-flying tone for company atmosphere and morale. Frank Daniels III was LHP, for "Lord High Protector." George Schlukbier was CBGL, for "Chief Bull Goose Looney." Employees followed suit with their own job titles. As in other internet start-up companies, there was frenzied activity 24-hours a day, seven days a week. A company lore evolved, with numerous stories such as the one about installing system upgrades and dropping dial-up customers by the rack. Even the FBI were regular players. During the period when Kevin Mitnick was America's most-wanted computer hacker (1994–1995) he was living in Raleigh and using cell phones to hack into ISP's and then telneting into unsuspecting UNIX servers (like Nando) and creating directories/files and deleting all traces. Nando technicians tried, but never quite managed, to get a fix on Mitnick's location. All the while, the company was in communication with the FBI. In fact, it was required to be in touch with the FBI. During this period, increasingly computer-savvy young people were starting to figure out the holes in Unix. Life was changing at Nando.

== Nando Times ==
In 1994 Nando.net added a Web server and a Mosaic-compatible website front end, and the NandO Times was born — one of the first updated-around-the-clock news and sports websites. Nando invented its own model of how newspapers could handle online production, news, sales and help desks while developing new online products.

At first, News & Observer copy desk staff (called sub-editors in the UK) fed stories to the Nando Times from the newspaper's main newsroom, using aging SII newswire editing terminals to add intermediate mark-up codes for further processing into HTML. Nando developers figured out how to semi-automate newswire story conversion and posting of news photos to the site, including an early Java-powered animated photo display, although the photos were never fully integrated with related stories.

Shortly before the Daniels family sold the News & Observer company to the McClatchy newspaper chain, Nando and the online News & Observer became separate operations and Nando editors moved into a separate building. Seth Effron became Nando's executive editor, Zonker Harris was the managing editor, Mike Emmett, who had a long career as a writer and editor with several of the U.S.'s largest dailies, was the sports editor, while Bruce Siceloff headed the NewsObserver.com staff. Michael Carmean, who had headed the copydesk staff, departed. Other early Nando personnel included Charles S. Powell (the "Evangelist"), Beth Ames, Fraser Van Asch, Lisa Pignetti, Gene Wang, Kirk House, Ari Spanos, Alfred Filler, Denise Long, Joe Sterling, Joyce Garcia, Dawn Harris, Sam Barnes, and Colin Boatwright. Barnes sometimes worked from the office of the N&O-owned Chapel Hill News, inspiring Bob Stepno, a Nando part-timer and University of North Carolina journalism doctoral student, to move his weekend morning shift there. In 2000, Schlukbier and Total Sports parted ways. Also leaving were Emmett and Harris, who both went to Miami to work for Terra.com, the world's largest Hispanic Web site. Emmett moved on to Time Warner/CNN as managing editor of NASCAR.com, then Greenville Online as assistant editor and finally, before retiring, Media General's Western Carolina Regional Manager. Harris continues to work for the Daniels family and is based in Cary, N.C.

=== Services Nando provided in 1994 ===
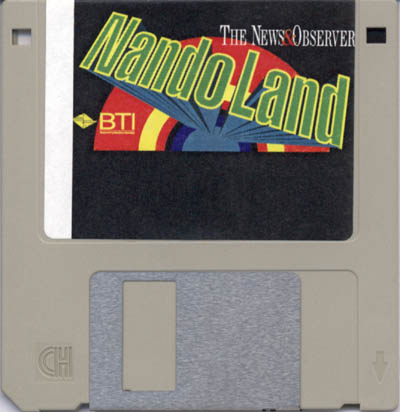
Nando Land logo

- Classifieds
- International News
- National News
- Regional and Local News
- Sports
- Business
- Lifestyle
- Interactive Websites for Valentine's Day and most major holidays.
- Games, including Mutants and Hangman.
- Chats
- ISP service including the first “Nando Doctor,” Kirk House. House made "House calls" to help users set up the dial-up service.
- Help Desk
- NIE ("Newspapers In Education") programs- NandOLand, free access to the internet for schools

After the McClatchy merger, Nando New Media evolved into McClatchy New Media, with the output of the Nando newsroom channelled to the "24 Hour News" section of all McClatchy newspapers' websites.

== News content ==
The Nando Times employed a round-the-clock crew of news editors, who reprocessed almost all of the News & Observer's incoming wire service feeds: Associated Press, Reuters, Agence France-Presse, New York Times, Wall Street Journal, Los Angeles Times, Scripps-Howard, Bloomberg and others. This was about a year before most of those news organizations created their own Web sites, and apparently before the wire services recognized an "online edition" as something separate from the printed newspaper. AP and Nando soon became allies in developing the model of how newspapers would use wire services.

Nando editors selected stories, wrote fresh headlines and sorted the wire service stories into news category pages — National, World, Political, Sports, Business etc. Nando's editors sometimes created "combined wires" stories or rewrote story leads. The Nando Times briefly experimented with original news reporting, including sports and election coverage, but became almost exclusively an aggregator and enhancer of news from traditional news services.

Nando excelled at posting "topic" pages carrying dozens of links for developing stories, such as the April, 1995, Oklahoma City bombing and the death of Diana, Princess of Wales. The Diana memorial pages, hundreds of headlines and pictures from Aug. 31 through Sept. 26, 1997, were among the last documents left on the Nando site in March 2005, although the linked headline stories had expired from the server.

== Hot Java ==
Nando Times' first development director, Colin Boatwright, experimented with new Java programming early, creating a Java-powered rotation of news photos on its home page in 1996, linked to photo gallery pages. Boatwright spoke at many of Sun Microsoft "Java Days" around the country, promoting the use of Java in content sites. Behind the scenes, the most lasting demonstration of Nando Media's Java programming was its Digital Work Bench content management system. The Java-based CMS was written from the ground up starting in 1999 by the company's development team, becoming the default publishing system for the Nando Times. It was later adopted by several McClatchy properties and was eventually re-written entirely in Perl.

== McClatchy buys Nando ==
The Nando "brand" became known quickly and was credited with enhancing the value of the News & Observer corporation, which the Daniels family sold in 1995 to the California-based McClatchy newspaper chain. The News & Observer's 1995 efforts also had included a computer-assisted investigation of the North Carolina hog industry, which won it the 1996 Pulitzer Prize for Public Service.

== Demise ==
After the sale, McClatchy abandoned Nando's dial-up ISP business (sold to MindSpring, now part of EarthLink) and cut back its exploration of original news coverage, which had included the 1996 election campaign. McClatchy shifted the focus of "Nando New Media" to serve its newspapers and other clients, while Frank Daniels III and other early Nando executives left to create Internet startups focused on community news (Koz) and sports (Total Sports).

With Nando's changing role, The News & Observer established an interactive media division in 1997, led by Mark Choate. The new division produced newsobserver.com, an online newspaper publishing local news and advertising, as a complement to the national and international news published by Nando. Under Choate's direction, newsobserver.com quickly became one of the leading local newspaper web sites in the country. By 2001, The Media Audit ranked newsobserver.com third in the nation in terms of local market penetration for online newspapers, trailing washingtonpost.com and austin360.com. In that same year, Editor & Publisher awarded newsobserver.com with an EPpy, naming it the best online newspaper service in its circulation category.

The Nando Times pages were discontinued May 27, 2003, replaced with a "Dear readers" page of explanation, with a directory of McClatchy papers' individual sites where the former Nando Times content could be found. The editorial staff continued to process wire stories, which fed the "24 hour news" sections of other McClatchy properties, such as NewsObserver and SacBee.

The Nando brand was abandoned by the McClatchy Company on March 3, 2005 in favor of the name McClatchy Interactive. It was absorbed into the rest of McClatchy in 2015 and became the company’s digital division.
