= Thereasea Elder =

American nurse (1927–2021)

Thereasea Delerine "T. D." Elder (September 2, 1927 – January 5, 2021) was the first African American public health nurse in Charlotte, North Carolina.

== Early life and education ==
Elder was born Charlotte, North Carolina. She was the sixth child of Booker T. and Odessa Clark. Her father worked as a porter and her mother did domestic work in homes. Elder described her childhood as wonderful, and that her family taught her the value of education and religious faith, which have guided her life and career. From a young age Elder knew what she wanted to do, as a result, when she was a student at West Charlotte High School, Elder began working with Charlotte Memorial Hospital. Because of segregation, she remained largely behind the scenes and rarely interacted with patients.

She attended West Charlotte High School during its inaugural year in 1938. After graduating high school, Elder attended Johnson C. Smith University for a year but later transferred to North Carolina Central University to study nursing. Elder described her experience in North Carolina Central University as "eye-opening," because the university provided opportunities for students to serve their community.

== Career ==
Elder went to work at the Good Samaritan Hospital in Charlotte in 1948. That same year she married Willie Elder, a World War II veteran who ran a service station. During her time at Good Samaritan Hospital, she completed a certificate program in public health nursing at the University of North Carolina at Chapel Hill. In 1962 she started working as a public health nurse for Mecklenburg County, where she would go into communities and perform health checks or administers prescribed medication. Her success was measured by the decreased numbers of absences in schools and a greater health literacy among the families she was responsible for.

Mecklenburg County tasked Elder with the responsibility of breaking the color barrier in public health service. Along with another African American nurse, she was assigned to predominantly white districts. She experienced skepticism and received disrespectful language. Elder even treated patients in Ku Klux Klan territory within Charlotte. Over time, she gained the same kind of relationship from her new patients that she received from her previous patients.

Elder worked with the Mecklenburg County Health Department until her retirement in 1989.

Elder also devoted herself to community improvement, earning local and state recognition. She was the president of the Greenville Historical Association was an active member of the National Association of Negro Business and Professional Women. She founded the Charlotte-Mecklenburg Black Historical Society and was on the Board of Greater Carolinas Chapter of the American Red Cross. She was recognized in 2013 by Johnson C. Smith for her work in strengthening the Rockwell neighborhood.

In 2001, Governor Mike Easley conferred upon her the Order of the Long-Leaf Pine for doing "great service to [her] community the state" The Thereasea Clark Elder Neighborhood Park was created in her honor by the Charlotte Parks and Rec. Department.
