= Wilbur D. Jones Jr. =

American author and historian

Personal details
- Born: Wilbur D. Jones Jr. July 9, 1934 (age 91) Wilmington, North Carolina
- Education: University of North Carolina at Chapel Hill
- Profession: Historian

Wilbur D. Jones Jr. (July 9, 1934) is an American author, military historian and preservationist. He worked to help pass federal legislation that in 2019 launched the World War II Heritage City program with the National Park Service. He also served in the Presidential administration of Gerald Ford.

== Early life, education and journalism career ==
Jones, a native of Wilmington, North Carolina, is a graduate of University of North Carolina at Chapel Hill later serving in the United States Navy.

== Political career ==
Jones served an assistant and advance representative to President Gerald Ford.

== Historical writings and preservation work ==
Jones is the recipient of the Order of the Long Leaf Pine, an honor given by the State of North Carolina. The award was presented in 2023 by Mayor Bill Saffo on behalf of Governor Roy Cooper, noting Jones' work for more than 10 years with U.S. Senators Richard Burr and Thom Tillis and U.S. Representatives David Rouzer and Mike McIntyre to make Wilmington the first World War II Heritage City in the nation; Jones' chairmanship of the USS North Carolina Battleship Commission in an appointment by Governor Pat McCrory, and his many books about military history.

Books written by Jones include:

- Terrorfliegers: How WWII American Airmen Survived German Captivity and POW Trauma. (2023) ASIN B0C88871D7
- The Day I Lost President Ford: Memoir of a Born-and-Bred Carolina Tar Heel. (2021) ISBN 978-0984490028
- She ‘Shot’ Her Way to Success: How China's Empress Dowager Ci Xi Launched a Photographer's Trailblazing Career. (2016) ISBN 978-0998073507
- Football! Navy! War!: How Military “Lend-Lease” Players Saved the College Game and Helped Win World War II. (2009) ISBN 978-0786442195
- Forget That You Have Been Hitler Soldiers: A Youth's Service to the Reich. (2002) ISBN 978-1572492172
- Hawaii Goes to War: The Aftermath of Pearl Harbor. (2001) ISBN 978-1572492608
- Gyrene: The World War II United States Marine. (1998) ISBN 978-1572491496
