= The News & Observer =

American newspaper

- The June 16, 2009, front page of The News & Observer
- Type: Daily newspaper
- Format: Broadsheet
- Owner: The McClatchy Company
- Editor: Nicole Stockdale
- Founded: 1865 (as The Sentinel)
- Language: English
- Headquarters: 421 Fayetteville Street, Suite 104; Raleigh, North Carolina 27601; United States
- Circulation: 34,376 Average print circulation 22,413 Digital Subscribers: Avg. mo. unique visitors: 4,537,000; Avg. mo. page views: 25,393,000; (as of 2020)
- ISSN: 2688-8807
- OCLC number: 46320400
- Website: www.newsobserver.com

The News & Observer is an American regional daily newspaper that serves the greater Triangle area based in Raleigh, North Carolina. The paper is the largest in circulation in the state. The paper has been awarded three Pulitzer Prizes, the most recent of which was in 1996 for a series on the health and environmental impact of North Carolina's booming hog industry. The paper was one of the first in the world to launch an online version of the publication, Nando.net in 1994.

== Ownership ==
On May 17, 1995, the News & Observer Publishing Company was sold to McClatchy Newspapers of Sacramento, California, for $373 million, ending 101 years of Daniels family ownership. In the mid-1990s, flexo machines were installed, allowing the paper to print thirty-two pages in color, which was the largest capacity of any newspaper within the United States at the time. The McClatchy Company currently operates a total of twenty-nine daily newspapers in fourteen states with a combined weekday circulation of 1.6 million and a Sunday circulation of 2.4 million. With McClatchy's acquisition of most of Knight Ridder's properties in 2006, North Carolina's two largest newspapers (the News & Observer and The Charlotte Observer) are now under common ownership.

== History ==
The News & Observer traces its roots to The Sentinel, which was founded by the Rev. William E. Pell in 1865 and who used, "the newspaper to fight against the domination of carpetbaggers and other forces during Congressional Reconstruction." The paper's struggles to stay relevant and make money led to new ownership in 1868. With the new owner The Sentinel began to cover the Democrats' push to retake the North Carolina Legislature, along with the impeachment of Gov. William W. Holden in 1871.

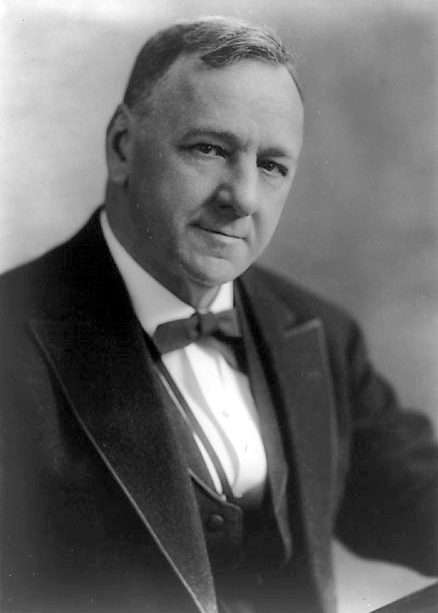
Josephus Daniels, the principal shaper of The News and Observer

The Sentinel went bankrupt a little over ten years after the paper was first founded. The owners of the newly founded Raleigh Observer, Peter M. Hale and William L. Saunders, bought the now-bankrupt paper, ending its publication and focusing on the Raleigh Observer. After about ten years the paper ran out of money, so the two owners sold to the owner of the Raleigh News, Samuel A'Court Ashe.

Ashe combined the two papers under the new banner The News and Observer in September 1880, making it the sole daily paper in Raleigh. Ashe ran the company personally until 1894, focusing on politics and the Democratic party. Ashe used connections within the Democratic Party to get an upper leg on upcoming stories. This model worked well for the paper until Ashe lost favor in the Democratic caucus, leading the paper to fall on hard financial times for the fourth time in its history.

In 1894 the paper was sold at auction, this time to a Washington, North Carolina, native who was a strong Democratic supporter. Josephus Daniels, with help from Julian Carr and other friends, bought the paper. Quickly Daniels refocused the News and Observer to combat rampant corruption and other problems he saw within the state. Put differently by Daniels himself, "The News and Observer was relied upon to carry the Democratic message and to be the militant voice of White Supremacy, and it did not fail in what was expected, sometimes going to extremes in its partisanship." Daniels believed that "the greatest folly and crime" in U.S. history was granting Blacks the right to vote.

In the findings of the Wilmington Race Riot Commission, Daniels is the only name mentioned as a cause of the Wilmington massacre, According to historian Helen Edmonds, the paper "led in a campaign of prejudice, bitterness, vilification, misrepresentation, and exaggeration to influence the emotions of the whites against the Negro." The result was the only successful coup d'état in American history, the overthrow of Wilmington's elected government by force.

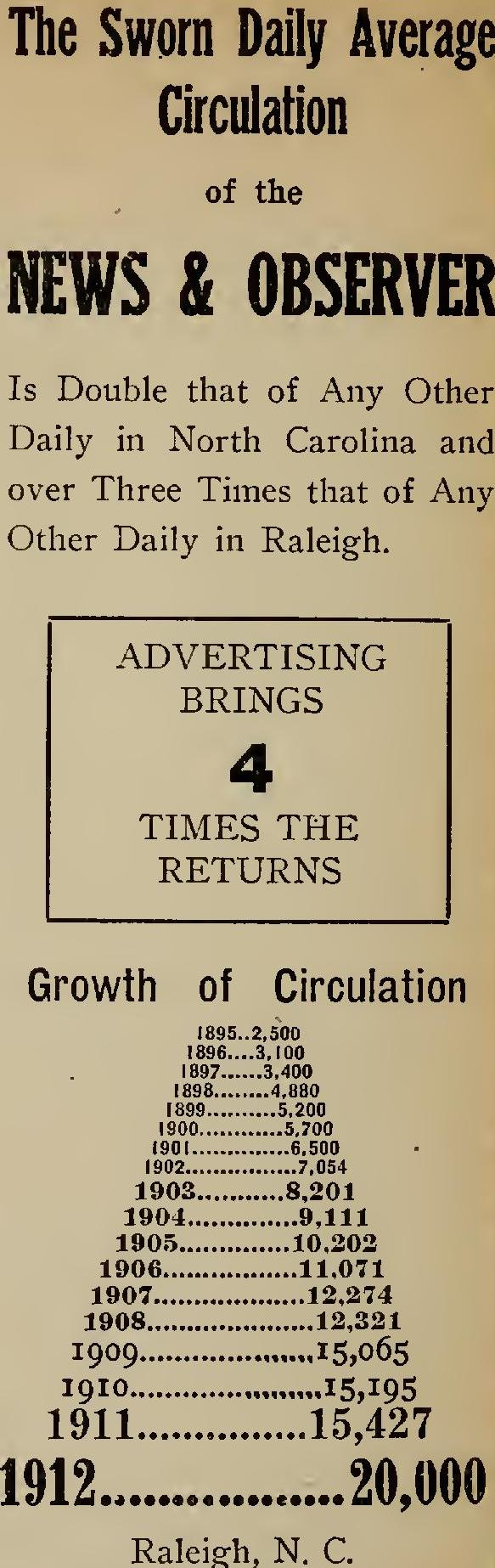
1913 ad showing circulation numbers in prior years

In 1900, he used the paper to support soon-to-be Governor Charles B. Aycock, another white supremacist, during his bid for the office. He also used the paper to advocate female suffrage, workers' compensation, state industrialization, better roads and crop rotation.

In 2006, on occasion of the release of the report of the 1898 Wilmington Race Riot Commission, the newspaper offered "an apology for the acts of someone [Daniels] we continue to salute in a different context…and for the misdeeds of the paper as an institution." The newspaper published a 16-page special report on the events of 1898.

=== After Daniels ===
Daniels continued to run the paper until his death in the mid-1940s. After his death his four sons assumed management of the company. All four sons contributed to the operation of the paper, but Jonathan Daniels, editor from 1933 to 1941 and from 1948 until 1964, kept the paper in the direction of appealing for school desegregation and a reduction in race related discrimination. It was also under Jonathan's leadership that The News and Observer bought out the Raleigh Times and moved to a building on South McDowell St. in downtown Raleigh, where they stayed until the building was sold in 2015.

On September 3, 1934, The News and Observer began a column about state politics called "Under the Dome", which started on the back page, moved to the front and now runs in the local section.

In 1968, the Daniels family hired Claude Sitton, who had been a correspondent for The New York Times and later an editor there. Serving as the editorial director of the paper, he promoted The News and Observer as a government watchdog and moved the news of the paper away from the personal and partisan stances it had taken under Josephus Daniels. However, its editorials were still often aligned with the Democratic Party, a party that in 1968 held different positions on integration than the party of Josephus Daniels' day. A year later, the Mini Page children's supplement was created and published. Today, it is one of America's most widely used children's newspaper supplements.

Frank A. Daniels Jr., grandson of Josephus, was publisher and president of The News and Observer from 1971 to 1996. In 1971, Sitton became the editor and the paper began buying and publishing smaller local newspapers, starting with The Island Packet in Hilton Head, South Carolina and The Cary News in Cary, North Carolina.

On March 16, 1980, a welder's torch started a fire and burned through newsprint threaded through the press, injuring three and causing millions in damage.

In 1987, the staffs of The News and Observer and The Raleigh Times merged, and on November 30, 1989, the last edition of The Raleigh Times was published. In 1988, The News and Observer endorsed its first Republican candidate for statewide election.

On July 12, 1991, the newspaper modified its title, replacing the "and" with an ampersand, while adding 33% more space for local stories. While publisher Frank Daniels wrote that the ampersand "harkens back to The N&O's original flag", the newspaper had been titled The News and Observer since its first issue as a consolidation of the Raleigh Observer and Raleigh News on September 12, 1880.

Throughout the early 1990s, The News & Observer divested itself of various local newspapers in South Carolina and the North Carolina mountains, and by September 1993, Sunday sales of The News & Observer reached 200,000 for every week. However, the newspaper still owns The Cary News, Chapel Hill News, and the Smithfield Herald among other newspapers. In 1994, the paper created Nando.net, becoming an Internet service provider and began publishing the NandO Times online newspaper.

In 1999, The News & Observer was named one of America's 100 best newspapers by the Columbia Journalism Review, and one of the 17 best-designed newspapers in the world by the Society for News Design.

In 2004, The News & Observer along with three other news publishers filled suit against the Raleigh–Durham International Airport for preventing the company from adding new newspaper racks in the terminal. After appeal, a 2010 decision from the Fourth Circuit determined that the restriction was a violation of the first amendment because it put a restriction on expression.

In September 2008, the News and Observer offered buyouts to all 320 newsroom employees, approximately 40% of its staff, in an effort to cut expenses. Previously the company had shut down its Durham news bureau and in a separate event laid off 70 employees. Layoffs and buyouts have continued since then.

In 2015 the newspaper announced it would sell its facility in downtown Raleigh for redevelopment, which will entail demolition of much of the facility. New presses will be installed at the newspaper's auxiliary production facility in Garner. Editorial offices will remain in a portion of the redeveloped facility. In March 2020, The News and Observer moved to a six-day printing schedule, eliminating its printed Saturday edition. By June 2021, the paper only employed 64 reporters.

== Awards ==
- 1983 – Pulitzer Prize in Commentary

Claude Sitton was awarded for his distinguished commentary.

- 1989 – Pulitzer Prize in Criticism

Michael Skube was awarded for his writing about books and other literary topics.

- 1996 – Pulitzer Prize in Public Service

In the winter of 1995, The News & Observer published a nine-part series on the booming pork industry in North Carolina. The series covered environmental and health risks of the waste-disposal systems used within the industry.

== Other publications ==
The News & Observer Publishing Co. formerly published a number of bi-weekly newspapers that focused on local news in various triangle-area communities. These included:

- The Cary News covering Cary and Morrisville.
- The Chapel Hill News covering Carrboro, Chapel Hill, Hillsborough, and Pittsboro.
- The Clayton News-Star covering Clayton.
- The Durham News was first published in 2005 and covers all of Durham County.
- The Eastern Wake News Serving Wendell, Zebulon, and Knightdale.
- The Garner-Cleveland Record Distributed to homes in Garner and Cleveland.
- The Smithfield Herald First published in 1882 Covers Angier, Benson, Four Oaks, Princeton, Selma, and Smithfield.
- Midtown Raleigh News covering the area between downtown Raleigh and the I-440 Beltline.
- North Raleigh News covering North Raleigh
- Southwest Wake News Covering Apex, Fuquay-Varina, Holly Springs, New Hill, and Willow Springs.

In June, 2017 these papers were shifted in focus from local community news to entertainment, food, and light features, and in January, 2018 were consolidated into a single bi-weekly paper titled Triangle Today, however that paper was discontinued in January, 2019.

The News & Observer Publishing Co. owns Insider State Government News Service, a newsletter publisher about state government.

== See also ==
- List of newspapers in North Carolina

== Bibliography ==
- "Pulitzer Prize Winners 1996: Public Service". Columbia University. Archived from the original on August 27, 2006.
- "The McClatchy Company Newspapers: The News & Observer". The McClatchy Company.
- "The North Carolina Election of 1898". University of North Carolina.
- "Wilmington Race Riot Draft Report Offers Revelations" (PDF). North Carolina Department of Cultural Resources.
- "Family History: Historical Context for the Pope Family". The Pope House Museum Foundation. Archived from the original on April 27, 2006.
