= Frank A. Daniels Jr. =

American newspaper publisher (1931–2022)

- Born: Frank Arthur Daniels Jr. September 7, 1931; Raleigh, North Carolina, US
- Died: June 30, 2022 (aged 90); Raleigh, North Carolina, US
- Burial place: Historic Oakwood Cemetery
- Education: University of North Carolina at Chapel Hill
- Occupation: Newspaper publisher
- Employer: The News & Observer
- Family: Josephus Daniels, grandfather

Frank Arthur Daniels Jr. (September 7, 1931 – June 30, 2022) was an American newspaper publisher and president. He was publisher and president of The News & Observer in Raleigh, North Carolina from 1971 to 1996. Daniels was an early user of the Internet for news delivery, establishing one of the first online newspapers. He was also a chairman of the Associated Press.

== Early life ==
Frank A. Daniels Jr. was born on September 7, 1931, in Raleigh, North Carolina. His parents were Ruth (née Aunspaugh) and Frank Arthur Daniels Sr., who was publisher The News & Observer newspaper from 1941 to 1971. The newspaper was purchased by his grandfather, Josephus Daniels, in 1894, serving as its editor and publisher until he died in 1941. Josephus Daniels was also the United States Secretary of the Navy and the United States Ambassador to Mexico.

Frank Daniels Jr. attended Woodberry Forest School in Woodberry Forest, Virginia. In the summer of 1946, he worked as a copy boy at the newspaper. He graduated from the University of North Carolina at Chapel Hill with an AB in history in 1953. After graduation, he worked in the composing room and the circulation department of The News & Observer. In 1955, he served in the United States Air Force for two years. He returned to UNC, where he studied law for two semesters before dropping out and going to work for his father at the newspaper.

== Career ==
When he returned to the family business in 1956, Daniels first worked in The News & Observer's advertising department. He became its business manager in December 1959 and, later, its treasurer. In 1968, he became the newspaper's general manager. Daniels was publisher and president of The News & Observer from 1971 to 1996.

Daniels earned a reputation as a liberal and progressive voice in the Southern United States. He hired Claude Sitton, national editor of The New York Timesknown for civil rights reporting, as the newspaper's editor. In the 1980s, Daniels formed The News & Observer Recycling Company to encourage the recycling of newspapers. In 1994, he started one of the first online newspapers, News & Observer Times. He also formed Nando.net, a commercial Internet service provider which dominated online sports coverage before ESPN and USA Today were online.

Under his leadership, The News & Observer won the Pulitzer Prize three times, including the Pulitzer Prize for Public Service in 1996. When the family sold the newspaper in 1995, Daniel's remained its publisher until he retired in early 1997. He then became a co-owner of The Pilot in Southern Pines, North Carolina. The Pilot then purchased the magazines Business North Carolina, O. Henry, Pine Straw, South Park, and Walter.

In 1983, Daniels joined the board of directors of the Associated Press, serving as its chairman from 1992 to 1997. He was also chairman of the board of the American Newspaper Publishers Association Foundation. Daniels was president of the Newspaper Advertising Bureau, the North Carolina Press Association, and the Southern Newspaper Publishers Association.

== Honors ==
Daniels was inducted into the Order of the Longleaf Pine in 1995. He was inducted into the NC Media & Journalism Hall of Fame in 1996. He received the North Carolina Award for Public Service in 1999 and was admitted to the Raleigh Hall of Fame in 2008. He also received the A.E. Finley Award for Public Service and was named the North Carolina Press Association's North Carolinian of the Year. The UNC Hussman School of Journalism and Media established the Frank A. Daniels Jr. Executive-in-Residence Program in his honor in 2020.

== Personal life ==
Daniels married Julia Jones on New Bern, North Carolina on June 4, 1954. They had two children, Julia Graham Daniels and Frank A. Daniels III.

Daniels was a member of the University of North Carolina Board of Governors. He served as a trustee at Appalachian State University, Peace College, Saint Mary's College, Woodberry Forest School, and the University of North Carolina at Chapel Hill's Institute of Private Enterprise. He was chairman of the Smithsonian Institution's National Board and served on the boards of the North Carolina Museum of History, the North Carolina Museum of Natural Sciences, the United Way of Raleigh, and the Raleigh YMCA.

Daniels was a president of the Raleigh Kiwanis Club and chairman of Rex Hospital, the Triangle United Way, and the United Arts Council of Wake County.He was a director of the RDU Airport Authority. He was a member of the Raleigh Junior Chamber of Commerce and the Presbyterian Church.

Daniels died in Raleigh, North Carolina, on June 30, 2022, at the age of ninety. He was buried in Historic Oakwood Cemetery in Raleigh.
