= Kenneth Merritt =

American military parachutist

Kenneth Merritt CSM Retired
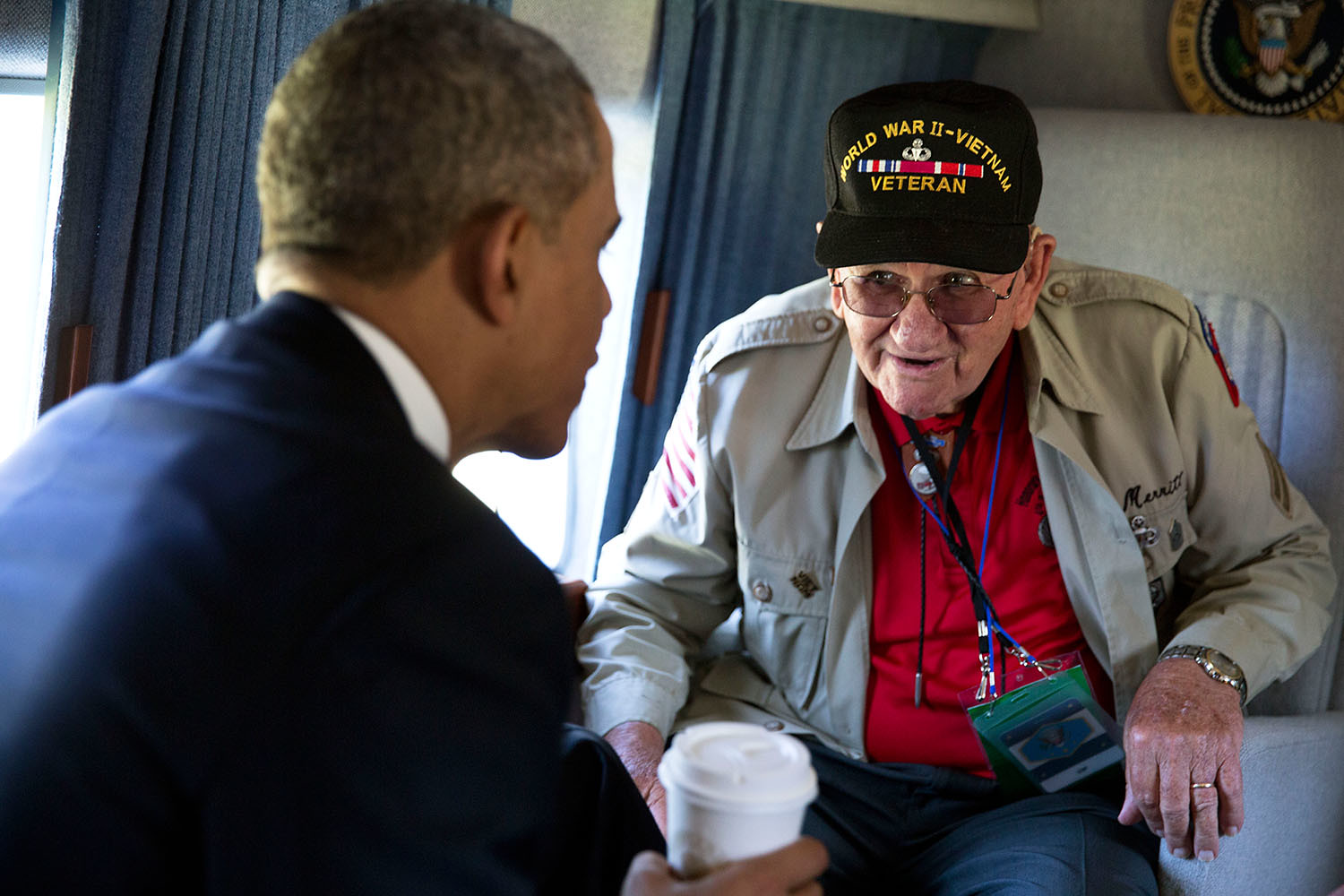
- President Barack Obama talks with Merritt aboard Marine One after departing the 70th French-American Commemoration D-Day Ceremony at the Normandy American Cemetery and Memorial in Colleville-sur-Mer, France, June 6, 2014.
- Born: Kenneth J. Merritt; August 23, 1923
- Died: March 10, 2021 (aged 97)
- Spouse: Sally
- Military career
- Branch: United States Army
- Service years: 1942-1977
- Rank: Command Sergeant Major
- Nickname: Rock
- Conflicts: Operation Market Garden; Battle of the Bulge; D Day

Kenneth "Rock" Merritt is known for his service with the 508th Parachute Infantry Regiment, especially during World War II. As a parachutist, he made jumps during D Day, Operation Market Garden and the Battle of the Bulge.

During his 35-year military career, he became closely associated with the 82nd Airborne Division.

== Early life and education ==
Merritt was born in Warner, Oklahoma on August 10, 1923.

Before enlisting in the military, Merritt served in the Civilian Conservation Corps at the age of seventeen to help support his family. He was discharged from the CCC five weeks after the Japanese bombed Pearl Harbor. He then went to work building Camp Gruber in Oklahoma and later Camp Hale in Colorado. Later on, he became employed at a naval shipyard in California.

== Military career ==
After his involvement in the CCC, he wanted to join the Marine Corps. When he was in the recruitment office waiting to talk to the recruitment sergeant, he was inspired by a poster depicting a soldier with a machine gun descending to the ground strapped into a parachute. Under the image was the words "Are you man enough to fill these boots?" Merritt then decided he wanted to become a paratrooper. He enlisted in the Army at Fort Sill, Oklahoma on October 15, 1942, when he was 19 years old.

He was then sent to Camp Blanding, Florida on October 20, 1942, where he joined the newly activated Headquarters Company, 1st Battalion, 508th Parachute Infantry Regiment.

Merritt attended parachute school in February 1943 at Fort Benning, Georgia (formerly Fort Benning) and received his wings three weeks later, making him a qualified parachutist. His first time in combat was on the night of June 6, 1944.

Merritt was promoted to corporal at Camp Mackall, North Carolina and had been trained there for advanced infantry and airborne operations training.

Merritt was nominated by Lieutenant George Lamm for the Silver Star and was presented with it by General Matthew Ridgway for disabling a German machine gun nest, during fighting at Hill 131 near La Cuiroterie, France on July 3, 1944. Although Merritt was never assigned to George Lamm's unit, he was attached to the company from Normandy through the Battle of the Bulge.

Merritt retired from the military at Fort Bragg, North Carolina (formerly Fort Bragg) on December 1, 1977.

== Later life ==
Merritt attended remembrance ceremonies for the D-Day landings in France in 2014 with other World War II veterans and world leaders.

In 2016, Merritt was the Grand Marshall for the annual Fayetteville Veterans Day Parade.

== Personal life ==
He lived in Fayetteville, North Carolina.

== Awards ==
- Silver Star
- North Carolina's Order of the Long Leaf Pine
- Doughboy Award
