= Ben C. Sutton Jr. =

American investor and philanthropist and the founder of Teall Capital

- Education: Wake Forest University
- Occupations: CEO and Founder of Teall Investments

Ben C. Sutton Jr. is an American investor and philanthropist and the founder and Chairman of Teall Capital, a private equity fund and portfolio holding company that helps colleges in their athletic operations.

The Teall portfolio includes a portfolio of businesses including Riddle & Bloom, a national next-generation marketing agency; TPG, a high school sports marketing enterprise; Tailgate Guys, a national market-leading hospitality company; Sunshine Beverages, makers of healthy energy beverages; Complex Sports and Entertainment; Nickel; and Dyehard Fan Supply, a national sports/entertainment merchandising business.

In addition, separate partnerships managed by the Sutton family include interests in the Winston-Salem Dash (minor league baseball club); Alpha Omega, Tolosa and Perinet (wineries in California and Spain); Algonquian Farms and R&S Farms (North Carolina farming operations); technology (including Xperial, Real World Playbook, and ClubUp); residential real estate development; and restaurants (including the award-winning Le Bilboquet in Atlanta).

Sutton was formerly chairman and president of IMG College, the largest college sports sponsorship and media company in America, and the top college or professional sports property sales organization in the country (as named by Industry trade, Sports Business Journal).

== Education ==
Sutton graduated from Wake Forest University with a bachelor's degree in 1980. He obtained a Juris Doctor degree from the Wake Forest University School of Law in 1983. Currently, Sutton serves in the board of Wake Forest University.

== Business career ==
Sutton's impact is evident in the development and commercialization of school sports in the United States. After spending nine years with Wake Forest University, Sutton founded ISP Sports in 1992. Over the next 18 years, he nurtured ISP from its first media rights partnership with Wake Forest to over 65 NCAA colleges and conferences. Under the leadership of Sutton, ISP Sports grew to become a leader in collegiate sports marketing. ISP also developed the largest companies in stadium comfort seating and primary market ticketing in the college or professional sports marketplaces with more than 150 university partners.

In 2010, Sutton led the acquisition of ISP by IMG. Mr. Sutton served as the chairman and president of IMG College at The Collegiate Licensing Company and helped lead the effort to sell IMG to Silver Lake Capital Partners and WME for almost $2.4 billion. After serving as Chairman Emeritus of IMG College, Sutton founded Teall Investments in 2017. Teall Investments LLC, is a private equity company based in Winston-Salem, Atlanta and San Francisco and manages significant investment interest in Fluent, Tailgate Guys, Sunshine, Riddle & Bloom, Applebee's, R&S Farms, Alpha Omega and many others. Currently, Sutton serves on numerous boards, including those for Wake Forest University, Ronald Reagan Foundation, U.S. Olympic Committee foundation, Falk School of Sports Management at Syracuse University, National Football Foundation and Naismith Memorial Basketball Hall of Fame.

== Awards and recognition ==
In addition to being named one of the top or most powerful sports executives in America by numerous publications, Sutton has received numerous awards. Order of the Long Leaf Pine, which is the highest civilian honor in North Carolina. Following years of service and philanthropy, Sutton was awarded the Wake Forest University Distinguished Alumni award in 2015. In 2017, he was inducted into the North Carolina Sports Hall of Fame.

== Philanthropy ==
The Sutton Family Foundation has invested more than $40 million in significant national and local causes, including:

- Sutton Recreation and Wellness Center at Wake Forest University (opened 2016)
- Sutton Sports Performance Center at Wake Forest University (opening 2018)
- Ben C. Sutton Scholarship at Wake Forest University
- Sutton Softball Field at Forsyth Country Day School (top high school softball stadium in U.S.)
- Family Life and Community Center at Knollwood Baptist Church (opened 2017)
- HopeWay Center (holistic psychiatric and wellness care; opened 2017)
- Donation to Reagan Foundation

== See also ==
- IMG College
