= Wendell Tabb =

American theater teacher (born 1962)

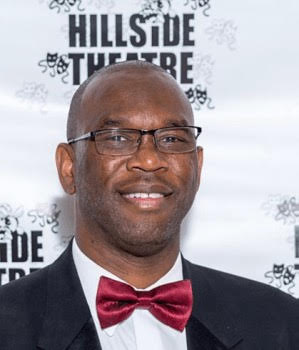
- Born: Wendell W. Tabb; August 19, 1962 (age 64); Louisburg, North Carolina, U.S.
- Education: North Carolina Central University (BA, MA)
- Occupations: Educator, director, producer, actor, politician
- Years active: 1987–present
- Spouse: Duchess Tabb (m. 1994)
- Children: 1

Wendell Tabb (born August 19, 1962) is an American educator, theater director, producer, actor, politician, and graduate of North Carolina Central University. He is most known for being the theater teacher and director at the award-winning Hillside High School in Durham, North Carolina for over 30 years. He is the former Chair of the visual and performing arts program at Hillside.

He is also the artistic director for the Triangle Performance Ensemble, a community theatre company based in Durham, North Carolina where he is the producer and director of Durham's Black Nativity, an annual theatrical production based on the work Black Nativity written by Langston Hughes.

He has directed over 100 plays throughout his career. He has also received over 100 accolades throughout the span of his career. In 2017, he was recognized by the Tony Awards as an honorable mention for the Excellence in Theatre Education Award. The theater and stage at Hillside High School in Durham, North Carolina is named after him (named in his honor).

== Early life and education ==
Wendell Tabb was born in Louisburg, North Carolina, the son of Lecelendia Massenburg Tabb, and Woodrow Wilson Tabb. He has three sisters Blondelle, Latrilla and Cynthia Tabb and one brother Woodrow Tabb II.

He participated in church plays and performed during family reunions when he was a child. In his early teenage years, he was a disk jockey known as DJ Soda POP.

He attended Louisburg High School in Louisburg, North Carolina where he was a popular student, a member of the Track team, and participated in his senior year musical theatre production.

Tabb attended North Carolina Central University in Durham, North Carolina. While he was a student, he was a member of the NCCU Department of Theatre. He was taught theatre by Dr. Linda Norflett and other outstanding faculty. He was also a member of Alpha Phi Alpha fraternity. Tabb received both his bachelor's degree in Theatre Education and his master's degree in Educational Administration from North Carolina Central University.

== Career ==
After receiving his graduate degree, Tabb started as a student teacher at the historic Hillside High School in Durham, North Carolina. After completing his student teaching, he accepted a position as the theatre teacher and director at the school. Tabb grew the theatre program at Hillside High School into a renowned program.

Since Tabb took over the program, Hillside High School Theatre has won multiple awards at the NC Regional Theatre Conference and the North Carolina Theatre Conference in Greensboro, North Carolina. Since 1987, the drama department has won over 100 accolades. Some of the programs accomplishments are 6 Best Play Awards from the North Carolina Theatre Conference; Numerous awards for Best Ensemble Acting, Best Costumes, Music, and Choreography. Hillside former student actress Ayeje Feamster won the North Carolina Theatre Conference Best Actress Award three consecutive years. Tabb has directed over 100 productions at Hillside High School. Most noted productions include Dreamgirls, The Wiz, Mama I Wanna Sing, In the Heights, West Side Story, Fame, Hairspray, Beauty and the Beast, among others. He is currently the producer of Black Nativity Durham, a play rewritten and inspired from Langston Hughes' Black Nativity. Wendell Tabb is the creator of State of Urgency, a play about a community impacted by gun violence. He is currently a member-elect of the Durham Public Schools Board of Education representing District Consolidated District A.

== Initiatives ==
During his career, Tabb has founded and created numerous initiatives. Tabb founded the International Exchange Program during his tenure at Hillside to expose students to foreign countries. During the same time, Tabb created the acting troupe ONE VOICE. The famed acting group has performed in Beijing, China; Havana, Cuba, Sydney, Australia; East and West Africa; London, England; Osaka, Japan; Lima, Peru; Rio de Janeiro, Brazil; Santa Cruz, California.

Tabb also created the Celebrities in the Classroom Program to further expose Hillside theatre and performing arts students to industry professionals in stage, film, and television. During the program, students participate in acting workshops and Q&A sessions with leading professionals in the industry.

Guest lectures of the program have included celebrities Danny Glover, Bill Cobbs, Obba Babatunde, Antonio Fargas, Chester Gregory, Jeffrey Anderson-Gunther, Petri Hawkins-Byrd, Starletta DuPois, Adré De Shields, Margaret Avery, Shirley Caeser, and choreographer George Faison. The program has also included lectures by fashion designer and icon André Leon Talley and comedian and television personality Biff Henderson who are also graduates of the school.

== Notable alumni ==
Tabb's former students include Academy Award nominated film director Kevin Wilson Jr., Actress April Parker Jones, Actress Lauren E. Banks, and Dancer Santron Freeman who is a former backup dancer for Beyoncé, Alicia Keys, Kelly Rowland, and Mariah Carey.

== Awards and achievements ==
Tabb has received numerous awards throughout his career. He has received the NC Regional Theatre Conference Excellence in Directing Award eight consecutive years. He is a past recipient of the C.C. Lipscomb State Best Director Award. He has served as an Arts Administration Fellow for the National Endowment for the Arts in Washington, D.C.

2017 Honorable Mention for the Tony Award for Excellence In Theatre Education; 2017 Congressional Recognition from Congressman G.K. Butterfield; 2016 NAACP Freedom Fund Lifetime Achievement Award; 2016 Sister Cites/ Mayor's Award for “Promoting International Understanding”’ and The 2014 North Carolina Central University Distinguished Alumnus Award in Theatre

the 2012 City of Durham “Key to the City Award”, 2012 North Carolina Governor's Certificate of Appreciation Award, 2012 Durham County Commissioner's Proclamation (“Proclaiming May 19th Wendell Tabb Day in Durham County”)

Durham Public Schools Teacher of the Year, Wal-Mart Teacher of the Year, the National Council of Negro Women Excellence in Teaching Award

In 2017, he was also an honored guest at Gov. Roy Cooper's State of the State address .

May 19 is Wendell Tabb Day in Durham County

In 2019, the theater at Hillside High School in Durham, North Carolina was renamed the John H. Gattis-Wendell Tabb Theater

In 2019, the stage at Hillside High School in Durham, North Carolina was named the Wendell Tabb Stage

Wendell Tabb was inducted into the Order of the Leaf Pine. The award is the highest honor given by the Governor of North Carolina.

== Personal life ==
He is married to the former Duchess Stallings, the couple has one son Emmanuel. Tabb lives in Durham, North Carolina with his family.
