= Mike Sprayberry =

North Carolina emergency management director since 2013

North Carolina Director of Emergency Management
- In office February 20, 2013 – August 1, 2021
- Governor: Pat McCrory; Roy Cooper
- Preceded by: Doug Hoell
- Succeeded by: William Ray

Personal details
- Born: Atlanta, Georgia, U.S.
- Spouse: Laura Sprayberry
- Children: 2
- Education: University of North Carolina at Charlotte (BS, MA)

Military service
- Branch/service: United States Marine Corps; North Carolina Army National Guard

Michael A. Sprayberry is an American emergency manager who served as the Director of Emergency Management in the North Carolina Department of Public Safety from 2013 to 2021. He oversaw the state's emergency response to several major disasters including Hurricane Matthew, Hurricane Florence, and the ongoing COVID-19 pandemic.

== Early life and education ==
Sprayberry was born in Atlanta, Georgia. He moved to Charlotte, North Carolina as a high school sophomore and attended West Charlotte High School. After graduating from high school, he joined the United States Marine Corps in 1973. During this time, he took college courses at night and earned two years of college credit. He enrolled at the University of North Carolina at Charlotte as a junior and earned a Bachelor of Science degree in business administration in 1979. He later earned a Master of Arts degree in history from UNC Charlotte in 1987.

== Career ==
He served in the North Carolina Army National Guard from 1977 to 1998, and received the Meritorious Service Medal with three bronze oak leaf clusters and the North Carolina National Guard Distinguished Service Medal. In August 2011, he was inducted into the North Carolina National Guard’s Officer Candidate School Hall of Fame. Sprayberry has said that his experience in the military led to his interest in emergency management.

Sprayberry received the Order of the Long Leaf Pine, North Carolina's highest honor for state service, from Governor Jim Hunt in 1998.

=== North Carolina Director of Emergency Management ===
Sprayberry joined the Division of Emergency Management in the North Carolina Department of Public Safety as deputy director and logistics section chief in 2005. In 2006, he assumed the duties of deputy director and operations section chief.

He was appointed as Director of Emergency Management in February 2013 by Department of Public Safety Secretary Kieran Shanahan to succeed the retiring Doug Hoell. In this role, he oversees the state's response to, and recovery from, natural and man-made disasters. He also serves as North Carolina deputy homeland security advisor and as vice-chair of the State Emergency Response Commission. During his tenure, Sprayberry has led the state's emergency responses to various disasters and crises including Hurricane Matthew, Hurricane Florence, and the ongoing COVID-19 pandemic. He has served under two governors of North Carolina: Pat McCrory and Roy Cooper.

After the impacts of Hurricane Matthew, several state lawmakers criticized Sprayberry and the Department of Public Safety for giving $5.3 million in recovery aid to the North Carolina Community Development Initiative, a nonprofit organization that used the money to repair storm-damaged affordable housing units and develop new affordable housing in affected areas counties. Sprayberry defended the grant, saying it was "based on the pressing need to get disaster survivors into sustainable living accommodations," and said he was unaware of a state requirement that the money be used for immediate housing relief.

Sprayberry is the director of the North Carolina Office of Resilience and Recovery, which was created by Cooper in the aftermath of Hurricane Florence to protect the state against future storms. Since then, the Office of Resilience and Recovery has expanded its scope to include rent assistance to people affected by the COVID-19 pandemic.

In 2015, Sprayberry was appointed to the National Advisory Council of the Federal Emergency Management Agency (FEMA) for a three-year term by then-FEMA administrator Craig Fugate. In August 2017, then-FEMA administrator Brock Long named Sprayberry as Vice Chair of the council. He was elected to a one-year term as president of the National Emergency Management Association in 2017, after serving as the organization's vice president.

In December 2020, it was reported that Sprayberry was under consideration by President-elect Joe Biden to become the next FEMA administrator; however, Biden ultimately announced Deanne Criswell as his nominee for the position.

In November 2021, Sprayberry joined Hagerty Consulting, an emergency management consulting firm.

== Personal life ==
Sprayberry lives in Raleigh with his wife Laura. They have two daughters.
