= Randy Woodson =

Chancellor of North Carolina State University

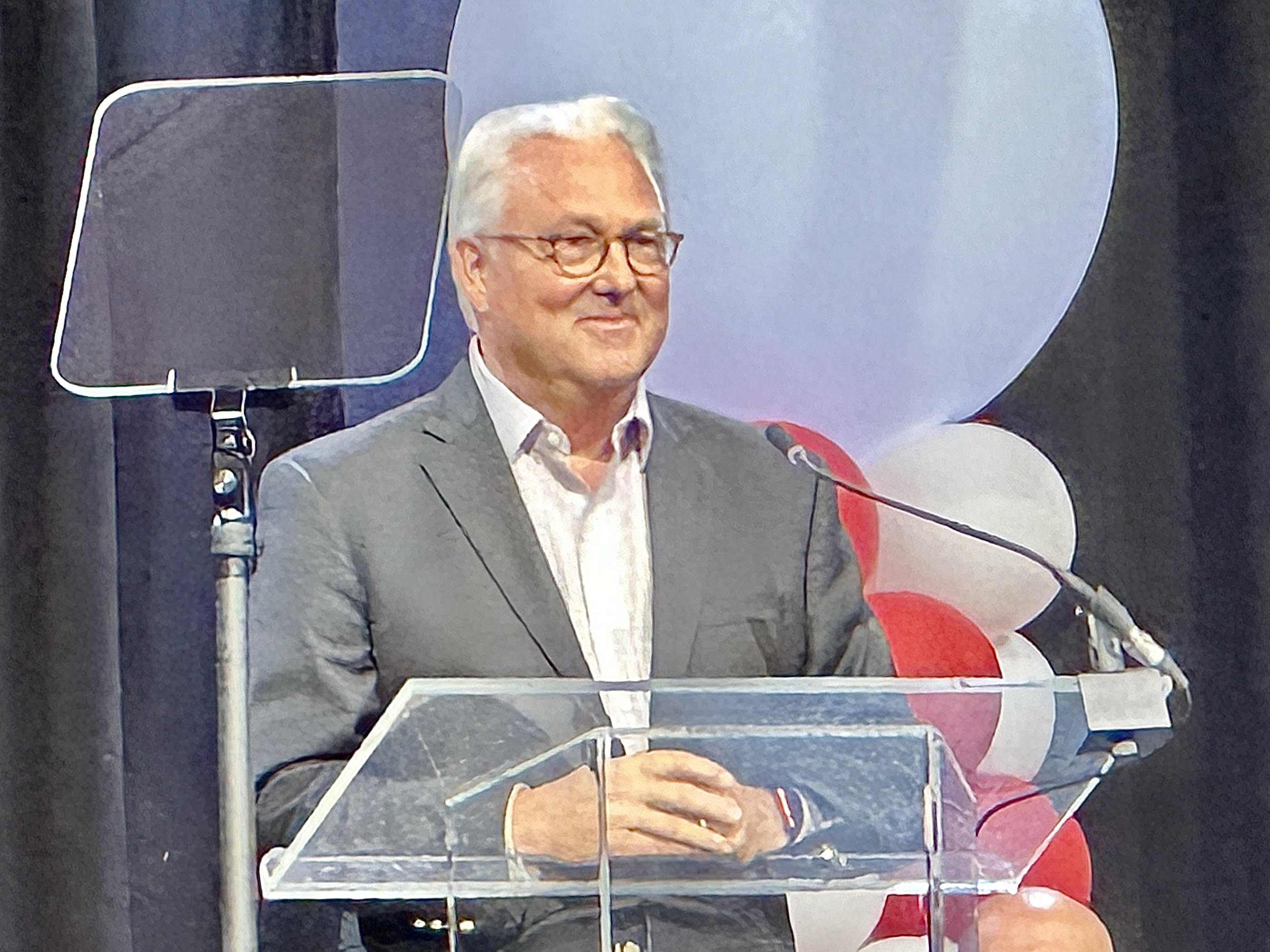
- Woodson giving a speech in 2024

14th Chancellor of North Carolina State University
- In office April 2010 – May 5, 2025
- Preceded by: James H. Woodward (interim)
- Succeeded by: Kevin Howell

Personal details
- Born: William Randolph Woodson; April 20, 1957 (age 68) Arkadelphia, Arkansas
- Education: University of Arkansas (BS); Cornell University (MS, PhD)
- Website: Official website
- Scientific career
- Fields: Plant physiology
- Institutions: Louisiana State University; Purdue University; North Carolina State University
- Thesis: Accumulation, assimilation, and partitioning of nitrogen in chrysanthemum x morifolium ramat (1983)
- Doctoral advisors: James W. Boodley; Robert W. Langhans

William Randolph "Randy" Woodson (born 1957) is an American plant physiologist and university administrator. He was the fourteenth chancellor of North Carolina State University.

== Personal life and education ==
Woodson was raised in Fordyce, Arkansas. He is married to Susan Wynne Woodson, and they have three adult children.

Woodson earned dual bachelor of science degrees in chemistry and horticulture from the University of Arkansas (1979) and his Master of Science (M.S.) (1981) and Doctor of Philosophy (Ph.D.) (1983) degrees in plant physiology from Cornell University.

== Career ==
Woodson began his teaching career as an assistant professor at Louisiana State University in 1983. He was on the faculty at Louisiana State until 1985, when he joined the faculty at Purdue University. At Purdue, Woodson served as both the director of the plant biology program and as the head of the Department of Horticulture and Landscape Architecture from 1995 to 1998. Then he became the associate dean of the College of Agriculture and director of the Office of Agricultural Research Programs. He served in that position until 2004 when he was made the Glenn W. Sample Dean of Agriculture. In 2008, Woodson was named Purdue's provost and executive vice president for academic affairs.

In 2010, Woodson succeeded Interim Chancellor James H. Woodward to become the fourteenth chancellor of North Carolina State University, the largest university in North Carolina. One of Woodson's first acts at NC State was to initiate the formulation of a ten-year strategic plan for the university. The result – The Pathway to the Future: NC State's 2011-2020 Strategic Plan – is the framework that guides university administrators in long- and short-term decision-making. It was approved by the NC State Board of Trustees on April 22, 2011.

As part of this plan, Woodson led efforts to expand interdisciplinary research at NC State through programs such as the Chancellor's Faculty Excellence Program, which centers on hiring clusters of faculty to collaborate in addressing global challenges from different perspectives, and the University Faculty Scholars program, which recognizes the university's leaders in academics and research.

Under Woodson, NC State received the two largest gifts in its history. In 2010, Lonnie C. Poole Jr. and his wife, Carol Johnson Poole, gave the university $40 million, which increased NC State's endowment by 10 percent. The majority of the gift was designated for what is now the Poole College of Management. Support was also designated for the College of Humanities and Social Sciences and for the construction of a clubhouse at NC State's golf course on Centennial Campus. In 2013, the Park Foundation donated $50 million to begin an endowment that will provide permanent funding for the university's existing Park Scholarships program.

Woodson was elected chairman of the Association of Public and Land-grant Universities for the 2013-2014 year.

On July 18, 2024, Woodson announced he would retire as chancellor of NCSU on June 30, 2025. His 14 year tenure as chancellor was the third longest lasting in the school's history. Woodson told reporters the reason for his departure was because it felt like "just a good time" to step down, and that he had considered retirement as an option for some years leading up to the announcement. Woodson also stated his interest in still being involved in higher education after retirement in the form of potentially teaching guest lectures and nonprofit work, but as a volunteer.

=== Research ===
Woodson's research focuses on the biochemical and molecular bases of plant aging and the role that ethylene plays in these processes. His research has resulted in the development of molecular approaches to improve post-harvest storage and shipping of horticultural products.

=== Awards ===
- Triangle Business Journal Top 100 Business Leaders
- Indiana Crop Improvement Association Distinguished Service
- Sagamore of the Wabash, presented by Governor of Indiana for distinguished service to the state
- American Society for Horticultural Science Outstanding Scientific Publication Award
- United States Department of Agriculture B.Y. Morrison Memorial Award

== Controversy ==
In early 2024, it was reported that Poe Hall, a building on university campus, contained toxic chemicals that were associated with 40 cases of cancer in employees and students who worked and studied there. It was later revealed over 190 people who worked or studied at Poe Hall had cancer, and that the university stalled investigations by the United States Environmental Protection Agency into the building and opted to use a private third party to investigate contamination. Woodson is quoted as saying "we own the building" and would only use data acquired from private consultants. Woodson announced his retirement shortly after.

In November 2024, it was reported in Technician that university professor Marshall Brain was found dead in his office. Brain was found after he had sent an email to multiple colleagues alleging retaliation for ethics complaints he had submitted to university administration.
