= North Carolina State University =

Public university in Raleigh, North Carolina, US

- Other name: North Carolina State University at Raleigh (official name)
- Former names: North Carolina College of Agriculture and Mechanic Arts (1887–1918); North Carolina State College of Agriculture and Engineering (1918–1962); North Carolina State of the University of North Carolina at Raleigh (1963–1965)
- Motto: "Think and Do"
- Type: Public land-grant research university
- Established: March 7, 1887; 139 years ago
- Parent institution: University of North Carolina System
- Accreditation: SACS
- Academic affiliations: ORAU; UGPN; sea-grant; space-grant
- Endowment: $2.54 billion (2025)
- Chancellor: Kevin Howell
- Academic staff: 2,464
- Administrative staff: 7,130
- Students: 39,259 (Fall 2025)
- Undergraduates: 27,885 (Fall 2025)
- Postgraduates: 9,347 (Fall 2025)
- Location: Raleigh, North Carolina, United States; 35°47′14″N 78°40′14″W
- Campus: 2,110 acres (8.5 km^{2}) Large city
- Newspaper: Technician
- Radio station: WKNC
- Colors: Red and white
- Nickname: Wolfpack
- Sporting affiliations: NCAA Division I FBS – ACC
- Mascots: Mr. Wuf & Mrs. Wuf
- Website: ncsu.edu

North Carolina State University (also known as NC State or NCSU) is a public land-grant research university in Raleigh, North Carolina, United States. Founded in 1887 by the North Carolina General Assembly as an agricultural and mechanical college, it is the largest university in the Carolinas and a constituent institution of the University of North Carolina system.

Though rooted in its founding land-grant mandate, NC State has grown into a comprehensive university offering degrees in over a hundred fields of study. It maintains historic strengths in science, technology, engineering, and mathematics (STEM), as well as agriculture. It is classified among "R1: Doctoral Universities – Very high research activity". NC State forms one of the anchors of the Research Triangle alongside Duke University in Durham and the University of North Carolina at Chapel Hill, a geographic region that facilitates collaborative research between the universities and nearby corporate and government partners.

NC State's physical footprint is defined by its red-brick Main Campus, which is anchored by the Memorial Belltower. Over the decades, the university has expanded southward into the mixed-use Centennial Campus and Centennial Biomedical Campus. These spaces integrate university research and academic facilities directly with government and corporate partners. The university enrolls nearly 40,000 students.

The university's athletic teams, known as the Wolfpack, compete in NCAA Division I and are founding members of the Atlantic Coast Conference (ACC). The Wolfpack have won six NCAA championships, including men's basketball and women's cross-country titles. The university's alumni include politicians, business leaders, scientists, and professional athletes.

== History ==
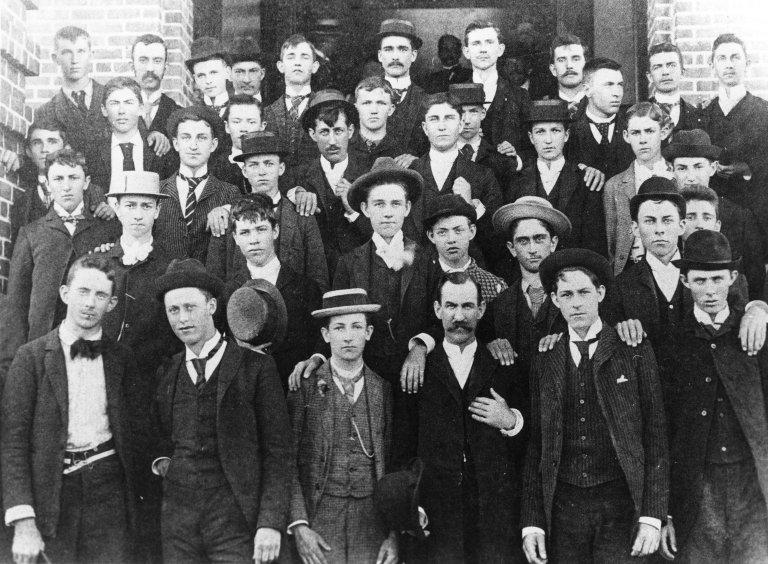
First freshman class at North Carolina College of Agriculture and Mechanic Arts in 1889

The North Carolina General Assembly founded NC State on March 7, 1887, as a land-grant college under the name North Carolina College of Agriculture and Mechanic Arts, or "North Carolina A&M" for short. In the segregated system, it was open only to white students. As a land-grant college, North Carolina A&M would provide a liberal and practical education while focusing on military tactics, agriculture, and the mechanical arts without excluding classical studies. Since its founding, the university has maintained these objectives while building on them.

After opening in 1889, North Carolina A&M saw its enrollment fluctuate and its mandate expand. In 1917, it changed its name to North Carolina State College of Agriculture and Engineering—or "North Carolina State" for short.

During the Great Depression, the North Carolina state government, under Governor O. Max Gardner, administratively combined the University of North Carolina, the Woman's College (now the University of North Carolina at Greensboro), and NC State. This conglomeration became the University of North Carolina in 1931.

In 1937, Blake R. Van Leer joined as dean and started the graduate program for engineering, among numerous other programs. In 1942, Van Leer successfully encouraged NC State's first women to pursue an engineering degree, 4-5 women would enroll and the first women graduated in 1941. One of his students, Katharine Stinson, became the Federal Aviation Administration's first female engineer. Following World War II, the university grew and developed. The G.I. Bill enabled thousands of veterans to attend college, and enrollment shot past the 5,000 mark in 1947.

State College created new academic programs, including the School of Architecture and Landscape Design in 1947 (renamed as the School of Design in 1948), the School of Education in 1948, and the School of Forestry in 1950. In the summer of 1956, following the US Supreme Court ruling in Brown v. Board of Education (1954) that segregated public education was unconstitutional, North Carolina State College enrolled its first African-American undergraduates, Ed Carson, Manuel Crockett, Irwin Holmes, and Walter Holmes.

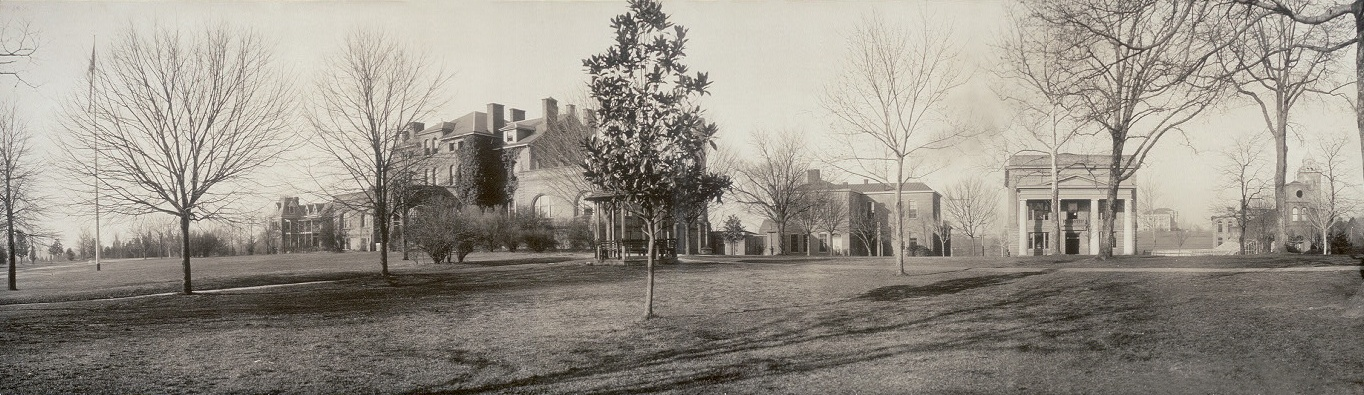
Panoramic photo of campus taken around 1909

In 1962, State College officials desired to change the institution's name to North Carolina State University. Consolidated university administrators approved a change to the University of North Carolina at Raleigh, frustrating many students and alumni who protested the change with letter writing campaigns. In 1963, State College officially became North Carolina State of the University of North Carolina. Students, faculty, and alumni continued to express dissatisfaction with this name; however, after two additional years of protest, the name was changed to the current official name, North Carolina State University at Raleigh. However, by longstanding convention, the "at Raleigh" portion is omitted even in official documents such as diplomas, and in practice the institution's name is simply "North Carolina State University"; "NC State University" is also accepted on first reference in news stories. Indeed, school officials have long discouraged using "at Raleigh" except when absolutely necessary, as the full name implies that there is another branch of the university elsewhere in the state.

In 1966, single-year enrollment reached 10,000. In the 1970s, enrollment surpassed 19,000 and the School of Humanities and Social Sciences was added.

Celebrating its centennial in 1987, NC State reorganized its internal structure, renaming all its schools to colleges (e.g. School of Engineering to the College of Engineering). Also in this year, it gained 700 acres (2.8 km^{2}) of land that was developed as Centennial Campus. Since then, NC State has focused on developing its new Centennial Campus. It has invested more than $620 million in facilities and infrastructure at the new campus, with 62 acres (0.3 km^{2}) of space being constructed. Sixty-one private and government agency partners are on Centennial Campus.

NC State has almost 8,000 employees, nearly 38,000 students, a $1.495 billion annual budget, and a $2.2 billion endowment. It is the largest university in the state and one of the anchors of North Carolina's Research Triangle, together with Duke University and the University of North Carolina at Chapel Hill.

In 2009, NCSU canceled a planned appearance by the Dalai Lama to speak on its Raleigh campus, citing concerns about a Chinese backlash and a shortage of time and resources.

NCSU Libraries Special Collections Research Center, in D.H. Hill Library, maintains a website devoted to NC State history entitled Historical State.

In October 2023, polychlorinated biphenyl was detected in Poe Hall. NCSU closed the hall the next month. The Campus Community Alliance for Environmental Justice, a student-led coalition, was formed to petition the college to test for environmental contaminants in all campus buildings and increase transparency surrounding Poe Hall.

== Campuses ==
=== Main campus ===
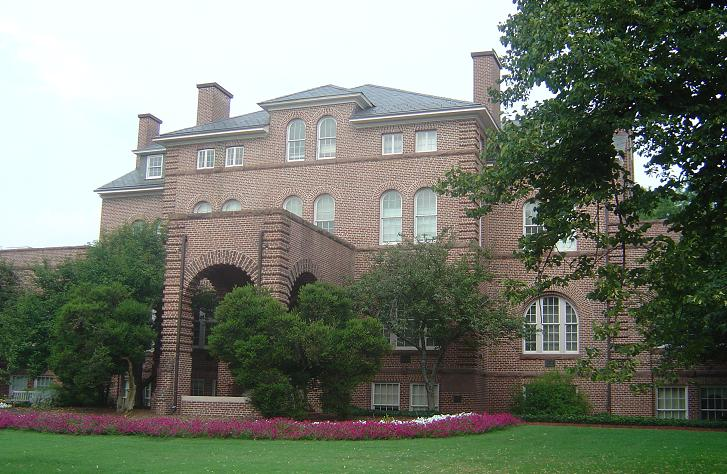
Holladay Hall, the first building built on NC State's campus in 1889, now houses the Chancellor's Office.

NC State's Main Campus has three sub-campuses: North Campus, Central Campus, and South Campus. North Campus is the oldest part of NC State and is home to most academic departments and a few residence halls. Central Campus is mainly residence halls, cafeterias, gymnasiums and student support facilities. Finally, Greek Court, the McKimmon Conference and Training Center, and student park-and-ride areas are found on South Campus. North and Central Campus are separated by the North Carolina Railroad. Pedestrian tunnels allow students to commute between campuses. Central and South Campuses are separated by Western Boulevard, a major downtown artery. University Housing divides Main Campus into West, Central, and East Campus for residence hall purposes. West and Central campuses are divided by Dan Allen Drive, while Central and East are divided by Morill Drive and Reynolds Coliseum.

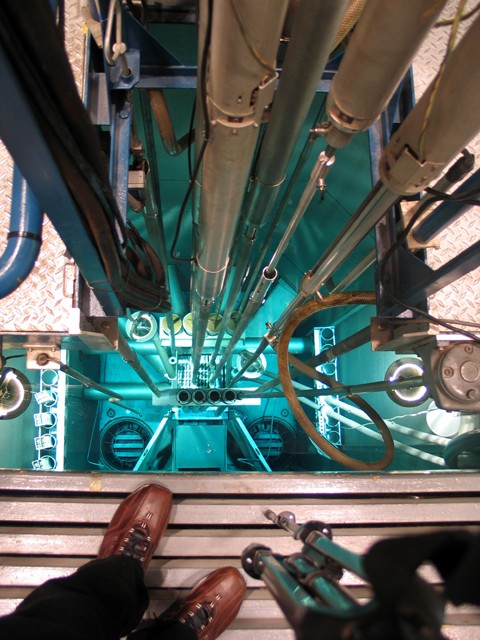
NC State's PULSTAR Reactor is a 1 MW pool-type nuclear research reactor.

Architecturally, Main Campus is known for its distinctive red brick buildings. Brick statues dot the landscape, and the University Plaza, colloquially named "The Brickyard", in North Campus is nicknamed for its paving material; most sidewalks are also made from brick. The Brickyard and sidewalks also contain white brick mosaics of the athletics logo and other patterns.

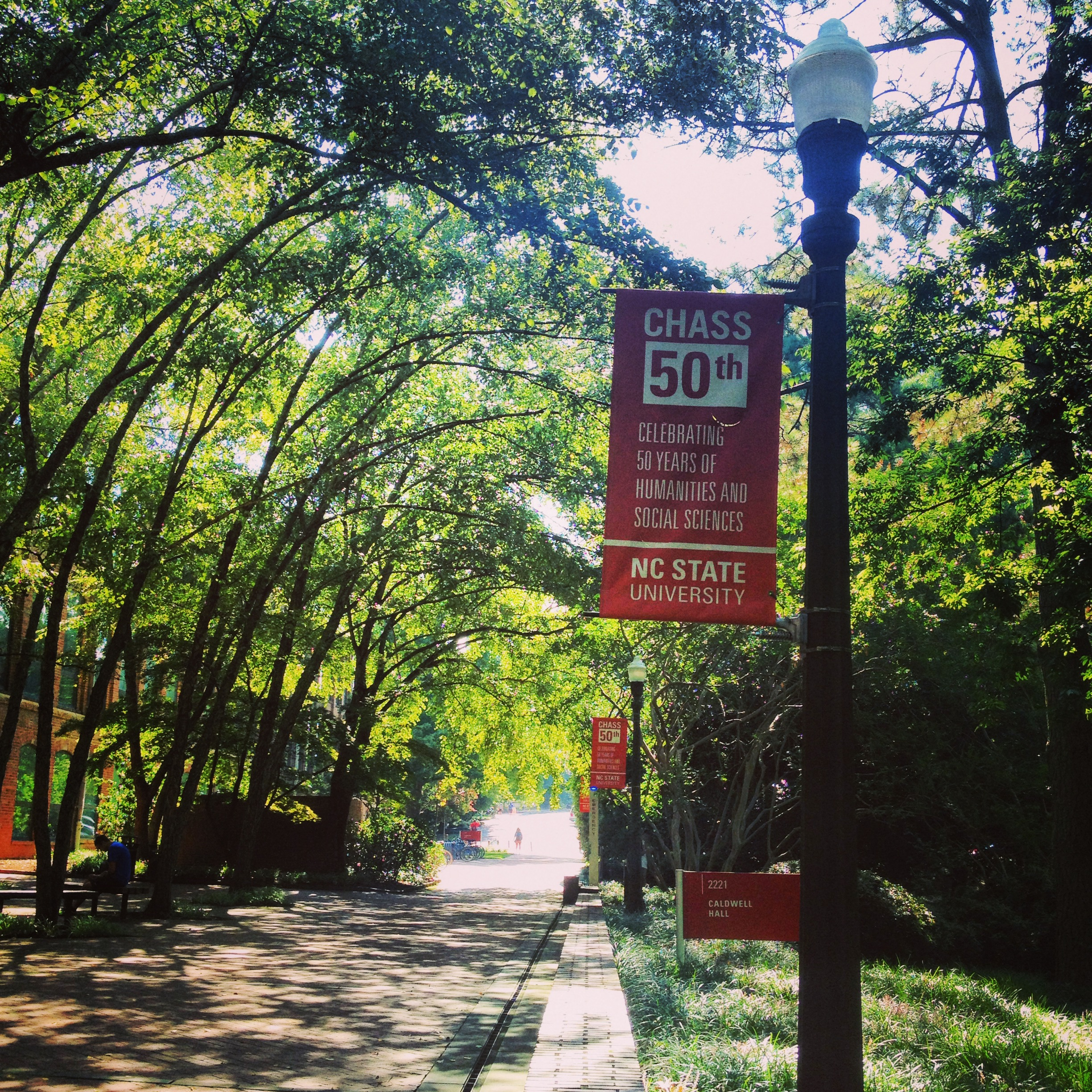
College of Humanities and Social Science at NC State

The Memorial Belltower, located in the Northeast corner of North Campus, serves as the signature of NC State and appears in the NC State Chancellor's Seal. It was constructed as a monument to alumni killed in World War I. The granite tower, completed in 1937, is 115 feet (35 m) tall. As a tradition, the Belltower is lit in red at night immediately following athletic victories and certain academic achievements.

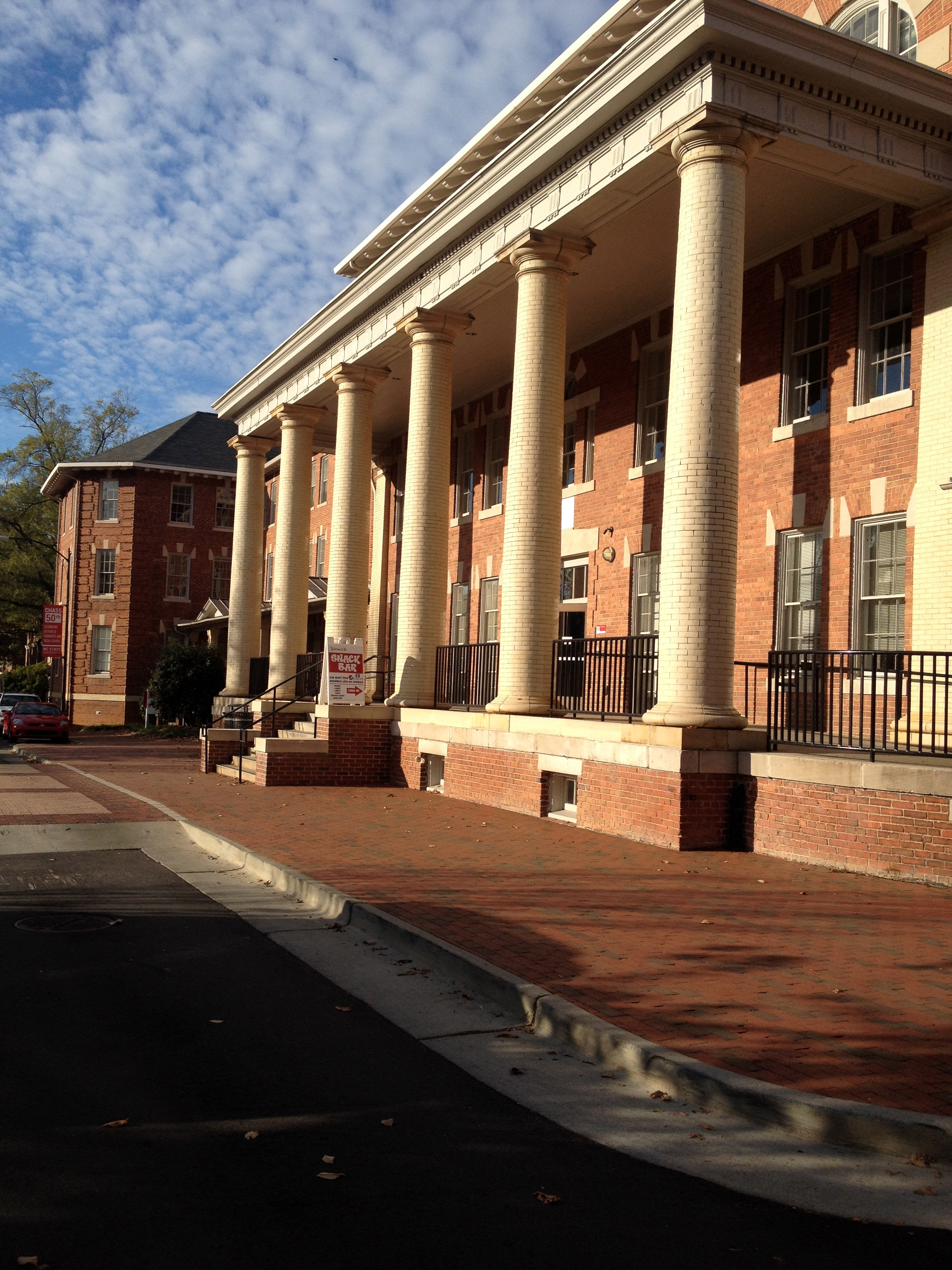
The 1911 building on North Carolina State's Main Campus

The Court of North Carolina, just west of the Memorial Belltower, is surrounded by the 1911 Building; the College of Humanities and Social Sciences in Tompkins, Caldwell, Winston Halls and The College of Education in Poe Hall; Page Hall, home to College of Engineering offices; and Leazar Hall, former location of the Computer Science Teaching Labs. It was once home to 100 trees (one for every county in North Carolina), but damage caused by Hurricane Fran in 1996 reduced the number significantly, including the destruction of a particularly old and large tree which was some 12 feet (3.7 m) in diameter. Some replanting has occurred, but the Court's former appearance is far from being restored.

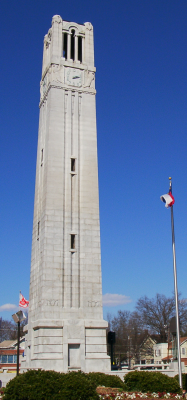
Completed in 1937, the Memorial Belltower was built to honor thirty-four NC State alumni who died in World War I. It stands 115 ft (35 m) tall.

Southwest of the Court of North Carolina is another landmark, the Free Expression Tunnel. The Tunnel functions as one of three pedestrian tunnels underneath the railroad tracks separating North Campus and Central Campus. This particular tunnel is the site of sanctioned graffiti; anyone may paint there, and it is often the place for political statements, personal messages, and art. This tunnel also serves as a way to advertise events going on around campus. In 2008, racist and threatening graffiti in the tunnel directed at then President-elect Barack Obama prompted an investigation from the United States Secret Service. Students held a "Unity Rally" in response to denounce the acts of racism.

The Wolfline bus service connects points on the campuses with each other. It also provides transportation to collegiate athletic events.

=== Centennial ===
NC State's main campus is augmented by the 1,334-acre (5.4 km^{2}) mixed-use Centennial Campus. Located 1 mi (1.6 km) south of the Memorial Tower, this campus houses university, corporate, and government research, in addition to classrooms and non-student residences. The Wilson College of Textiles has been based on this campus since 1991. Beginning in 2002, the College of Engineering began to relocate to Centennial Campus. Six of the nine College of Engineering departments are housed in three Engineering Buildings in an area known as the Engineering Oval. The Golden LEAF Biomanufacturing Training and Education Center (BTEC), part of the College of Engineering, is located adjacent to the Engineering Oval. The offices of ABB, LexisNexis and the National Weather Service are also on the Centennial Campus, as well as Centennial Campus Magnet Middle School.

==== Centennial Biomedical Campus ====
The North Carolina State University Centennial Biomedical Campus is located 2.5 mi (4.0 km) west of the NCSU Memorial Tower. North Carolina State University College of Veterinary Medicine, NC State's professional college and North Carolina's only veterinary medicine program, serves as the anchor of the Biomedical Campus. The 180-acre (0.73 km^{2}) campus consists of 20 buildings including the 100,000-square-foot (9,300 m^{2}) CVM Research Building where biomedical investigations in genomic sciences; vaccine development; cancer immuno-therapy; emerging and infectious zoonotic diseases; and diseases of the lung, respiratory tract, skin, and digestive system are undertaken. The Center for Comparative Medicine and Translational Research, the Veterinary Teaching Hospital with its clinical research and clinical trials, and the Teaching Animal Unit (TAU), which is a working farm, are also campus elements. The 110,000-square-foot Randall B. Terry Jr. Companion Animal Veterinary Medical Center, completed in 2011, doubled the size of the veterinary hospital.

J. C. Raulston Arboretum is an 8-acre (0.03 km^{2}) arboretum and botanical garden operated by NC State, and located just south of West Campus. It is open daily without charge.

=== NC Research Campus ===
NC State is one of eight universities with a presence at the North Carolina Research Campus, a 340-acre biotechnology hub in Kannapolis, NC. The university operates the Plants for Human Health Institute (PHHI), a research and education organization devoted to research involving food crops, like fruits and vegetables, and the potential health-promoting properties they convey when consumed. NC State's College of Agriculture and Life Sciences staffs the institute with faculty from the departments of horticultural science; food, bioprocessing and nutrition sciences; plant and microbial biology; genetics; and agricultural and resource economics.

PHHI has both research and Cooperative Extension components. Mary Ann Lila is director of the Plants for Human Health Institute. As of February 2024, PHHI is home to around 11 faculty and 70 staff at the NC Research Campus.

NC State began operations in Kannapolis in 2007 as the Fruit and Vegetable Science Institute. The university was one of the first organizations to join the fledgling biotech hub that would become the NC Research Campus. The university's program was renamed the Plants for Human Health Institute when the NC Research Campus was officially dedicated on October 20, 2008, in order "to more accurately reflect the groundbreaking research approach the institute will take. Institute research will focus on identifying and making available to consumers bioactive compounds in plants that prevent and treat disease."

=== Sustainability ===
In March 2008, NC State launched the University Sustainability Office in order to address environmental concerns on campus. The university has established a commitment to reduce its annual energy consumption per square foot by at least 4% over a 10-year period. In addition, the university has surpassed the Executive Order 156 goal of diverting 40 percent of their solid waste stream from the landfill through a variety of campus reuse and recycling programs. NC State incorporates locally grown, organic, and free range foods into dining service meals at several events such as Earth Week's EarthFest and the annual All Carolinas Meal with foods local to the Carolinas.

Examinations of the campus' sustainability practices by the Sustainable Endowments Institute resulted in a "B+" grade for NC State on the College Sustainability Report Card 2011. In 2013 the University Housing department agreed to incorporate a new living and learning community known as "EcoVillage." Members of EcoVillage were originally housed in Bragaw Residence Hall on West Campus. Today, EcoVillage is housed in the adjacent Lee Residence Hall. Members of EcoVillage complete numerous volunteer based sustainability trips every semester and attend various discussions about how to improve and further the university's reach into sustainability.

== Academics ==
=== Structure ===
NC State is one of 17 institutions that constitute the University of North Carolina system. Each campus has a high degree of independence, but each submits to the policies of the UNC system board of governors. The 32 voting members of the board of governors are elected by the North Carolina General Assembly for four-year terms. President Peter Hans heads the system.

The board of trustees of NC State has thirteen members and sets all policies for the university. The UNC system board of governors elects eight of the trustees and the governor of North Carolina appoints four. The student body president serves on the board of trustees as a voting member. The UNC system also elects the chancellor of NC State, currently Kevin Howell.

The board of trustees administers NC State's eleven academic colleges. Each college grants its own degrees with the exception of the First Year College which provides incoming freshmen the opportunity to experience several disciplines before selecting a major. The College of Agriculture and Life Sciences is the only college to offer associate degrees and the College of Veterinary Medicine does not grant undergraduate degrees. Each college is composed of numerous departments that focus on a particular discipline or degree program, for example Food Science, Civil Engineering, Genetics or Accounting. There are a total of 66 departments administered by all eleven NC State colleges.

In total, NC State offers nine associate degree programs in agriculture, bachelor's degrees in 102 areas of study, master's degrees in 108 areas, and doctorate degrees in 60 areas. NC State is known for its programs in agriculture, engineering, textiles, and design. The textile and paper engineering programs are notable, given the uniqueness of the subject area.

=== Academic divisions ===
As of the 2018–2019 school year, NC State had the following colleges and academic departments:

- College of Agriculture and Life Sciences
- College of Design
- College of Education
- College of Engineering
- College of Humanities and Social Sciences
- College of Natural Resources
- Poole College of Management
- College of Sciences
- Wilson College of Textiles
- College of Veterinary Medicine
- The Graduate School
- University College

=== Admission ===
Considered a more selective university, NC State accepts about half of those who apply for undergraduate admission. For the class of 2019, 21,104 applied and 10,584, or 50%, were accepted, of whom 4,210 enrolled.

Members of the class of 2019 had average SAT verbal, math and writing scores of 610, 640 and 587, respectively, for a two-part total (verbal and math) of 1250 (1600-point scale) or a three-part total of 1836 (2400-point scale). The 4,210 students who enrolled had an average high school GPA of 3.44; 40%, or 1,677, ranked in the top 10% of their graduating classes. There were 130 valedictorians and 102 salutatorians in the class.

Transfer admission is also very competitive. In the fall of 2015, 4,165 students applied to the transfer class; 1,470, or 35%, were admitted.

NC State requires undergraduate admission candidates to choose a preferred college of study. After determining that an applicant meets the overall university requirements, the individual college must also agree to accept the student. Because of this process, some colleges have significantly higher admission requirements than others.

The Graduate School reviews all postgraduate education applications. For fall 2015, 14,394 prospective students applied to the Graduate School; 3,460 (24%) were admitted. Of these, 2,982 (80.3%) enrolled.

The Master of Science in Analytics (MSA) degree awarded by the Institute for Advanced Analytics is the university's most selective graduate program accepting around one-in-eight applicants.

=== Libraries ===
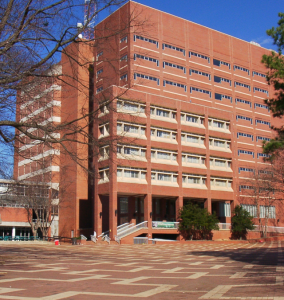
D.H. Hill Library stands 11 stories tall and is named for former NC State chancellor and librarian Daniel Harvey Hill Jr., son of Confederate Civil War General D.H. Hill.

NC State University Libraries, ranked 30th out of 120 North American research libraries, includes 4.4 million volumes, over 50,000 print and electronic serial subscriptions, more than 20,000 videos and film holdings, and more than 40,000 digital images (as of 2011). The library system has an annual budget of over $40 million.

The library system consists of five libraries: two main libraries and three branch libraries. The D. H. Hill Jr. Library, on Main Campus, is over nine stories tall and covers over 119,000 square feet. This library is on North Main Campus in the center of University Plaza, or often called "The Brickyard" and is 11,000 square meters. The James B. Hunt Jr. Library, on the university's Centennial Campus, opened in January 2013 and covers over 221,000 square feet. NC State, as a member of the Triangle Research Libraries Network (TRLN), has interlibrary loan services with Duke University, the University of North Carolina at Chapel Hill, and North Carolina Central University.

=== Rankings and reputation ===
Academic rankings

National
- Forbes: 65
- U.S. News & World Report: 64 (tie)
- Washington Monthly: 89
- WSJ/College Pulse: 104

Global
- ARWU: 201–300
- QS: =272
- THE: 251–300
- U.S. News & World Report: 269

In 2014–2015 NC State became part of only fifty-four institutions in the U.S. to have earned the "Innovation and Economic Prosperity University" designation by the Association of Public and Land-grant Universities.

For 2025, U.S. News & World Report ranked NC State tied for 58th out of all national universities and tied for 26th out of public universities in the U.S., tied at 34th for "best college for veterans" and 60th for "best value" schools.

NC State's College of Engineering was tied for 24th by U.S. News & World Report, with many of its programs ranking in the top 30 nationally. NC State's Nuclear Engineering program is considered to be one of the best in the world and in 2020, was ranked 3rd in the country (behind MIT and the University of Michigan Ann Arbor). The biological and agricultural engineering programs are also widely recognized and were ranked 4th nationally. In 2019 NC State's manufacturing and industrial engineering program was ranking 13th in the nation, and material science at 15th. Other notable programs included civil engineering at 20th, environmental engineering tied at 21st, chemical engineering tied for 22nd, computer engineering at 28th, and biomedical engineering ranking 28th nationally in 2019. In 2019, the Academic Ranking of World Universities ranked NC State's electrical engineering program 9th internationally and chemical engineering 20th. In 2020, The Princeton Review ranked NC State 36th for game design.

NC State is also home to the only college dedicated to textiles in the country, the Wilson College of Textiles, which is a partner of the National Council of Textile Organizations and is widely regarded as one of the best textiles programs in the world. In 2020 the textile engineering program was ranked 1st nationally by College Factual. In 2017, Business of Fashion Magazine ranked the college's fashion and apparel design program 8th in the country and 30th in the world. In 2018, Fashion Schools ranked the college's fashion and textile management program 11th in the nation.

NC State's Masters program in data analytics was the first in the United States. Launched in 2007, it is part of the Institute for Advanced Analytics and was created as a university-wide multidisciplinary initiative to meet the rapidly growing demand in the labor market for analytics professionals. In 2012, Thomas H. Davenport and D.J. Patil highlighted the MSA program in Harvard Business Review as one of only a few sources of talent with proven strengths in data science.

NC State is known for its College of Veterinary Medicine and in 2020 it was ranked 4th nationally, by U.S. News & World Report, 25th internationally by NTU Ranking and 36th internationally by the Academic Ranking of World Universities.

In 2020, NC State's College of Design was ranked 25th by College Factual. In 2018, the Animation Career Review ranked NC State's Graphic Design program 4th in the country and best among public universities.

In 2020, the College of Education tied for 45th in the U.S. and the Poole College of Management is tied for 52nd among business schools. NC State's Entrepreneurship program is ranked 10th internationally among undergraduate programs by The Princeton Review in 2020. For 2010 the Wall Street Journal surveyed recruiters and ranked NC State number 19 among the top 25 recruiter picks. In 2022, U.S. News & World Report ranked the Department of Statistics 11th (tied) in the nation.

In fiscal year 2019, NC State University received 95 awards and $29,381,782 in National Institutes of Health (NIH) Funds for Research. For fiscal year 2017, NC State was ranked 45th in total research expenditure by the National Science Foundation.

Kiplinger's Personal Finance placed NC State 9th in its 2018 ranking of best value public colleges in the United States.

=== Scholarships ===
There are several notable scholarships of North Carolina State University which include:

- The Park Scholarship Program – Named after Roy H. Park (class of 1931), the Park Scholarship Program was established in 1996 following a donation by the Park Foundation. Approximately 35 to 40 incoming first-year students are selected per cohort after evaluation on the criteria of scholarship, leadership, service, and character. The scholarship covers tuition, room and board, food, books, and other personal expenses, renewable up to eight semesters of study.
- The Caldwell Fellows Program – Created by the NC State Alumni Association to honor the legacy of former Chancellor John T. Caldwell, the Caldwell Fellows Program is a leadership development scholarship program with a strong focus on servant leadership.
- The Goodnight Scholars Program and Goodnight Transfer Scholars Program – Established in 2008 by Dr. James Goodnight and Mrs. Ann Goodnight of the SAS Institute, the Goodnight Scholars Program provides 100 incoming traditional students and 60 incoming transfer students an award worth $24,000 per academic year for up to eight semesters for first year students and six semesters for transfer students. The scholarship also provides enrichment grants for personal and professional development, alongside travel opportunities and programming.
- The Centennial Scholarship – This scholarship to the Wilson College of Textiles was introduced by the North Carolina Textile Foundation in 1999 as a part of the Wilson College of Textiles' Centennial Celebration and pays approximately 80% of expenses to attend NC State and a $7,500 enrichment fund.
- Oaks Leadership Scholarship – Created by NC State faculty Jackie Bruce & Katherine McKee after a shared experience at a diversity and inclusion training.

=== Special programs ===
The Entrepreneurship Initiative (EI) at NC State was formed In July 2008 in response to the Chancellor's call to "develop an educated an entrepreneurial work force." By organizing and energizing its entrepreneurial efforts through the initiative, NC State hopes to provide a comprehensive springboard for ideas, projects, and partnerships.

The Young and Teen Writers' Workshop is a summer creative writing program for area high school and middle school students. Sponsored by the English Department within the College of Humanities and Social Sciences and held on NC State University's campus, the Young and Teen Writers' Workshop teaches creative writing skills and techniques, while also improving communication skills and confidence. YTWW was founded in 1986 and is one of the oldest and most affordable young writing summer programs in the nation. Courses offered include fiction, poetry, creative nonfiction, genre fiction, graphic novels, and dramatic writing. The director since 2015 is William K. Lawrence.

== Athletics ==
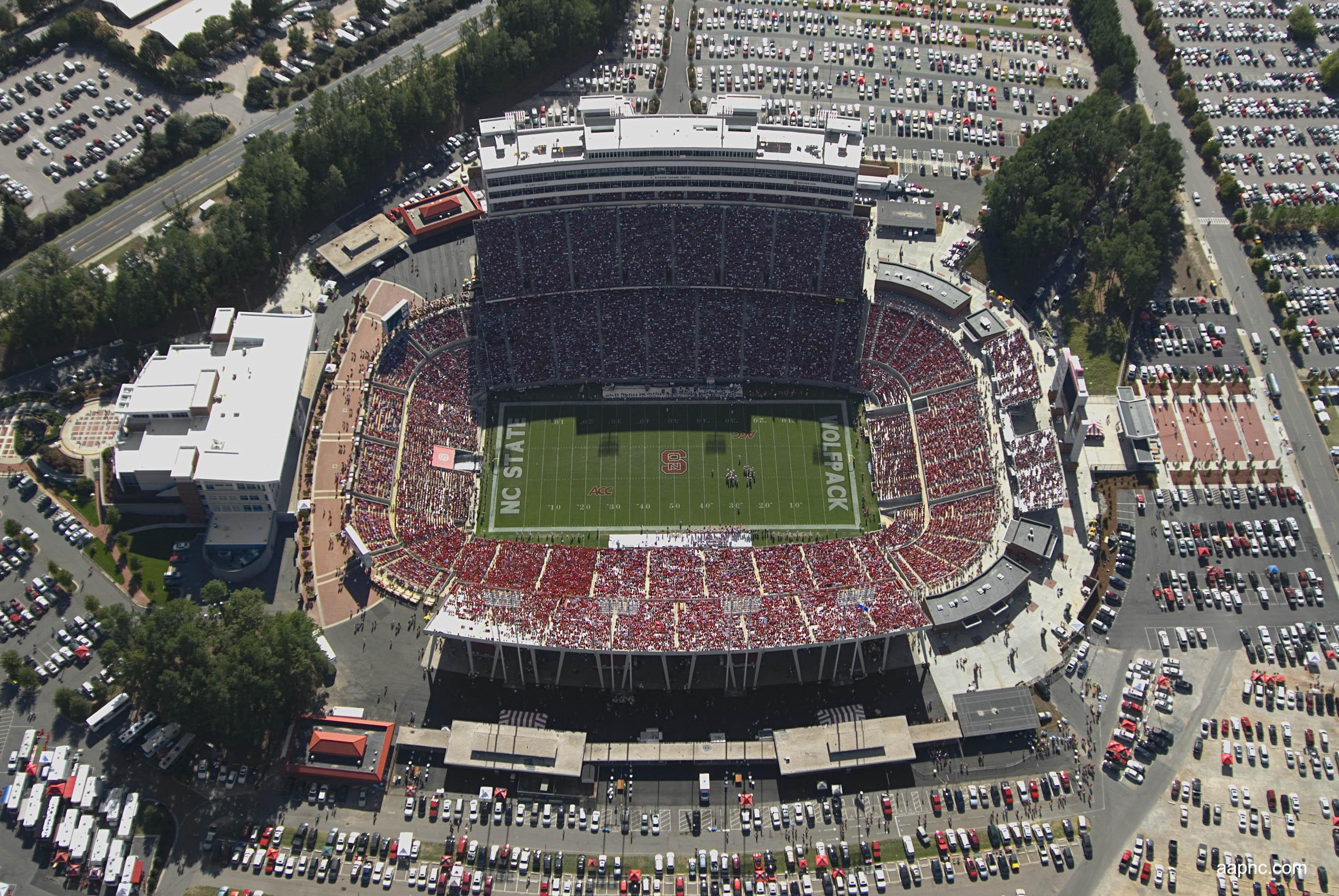
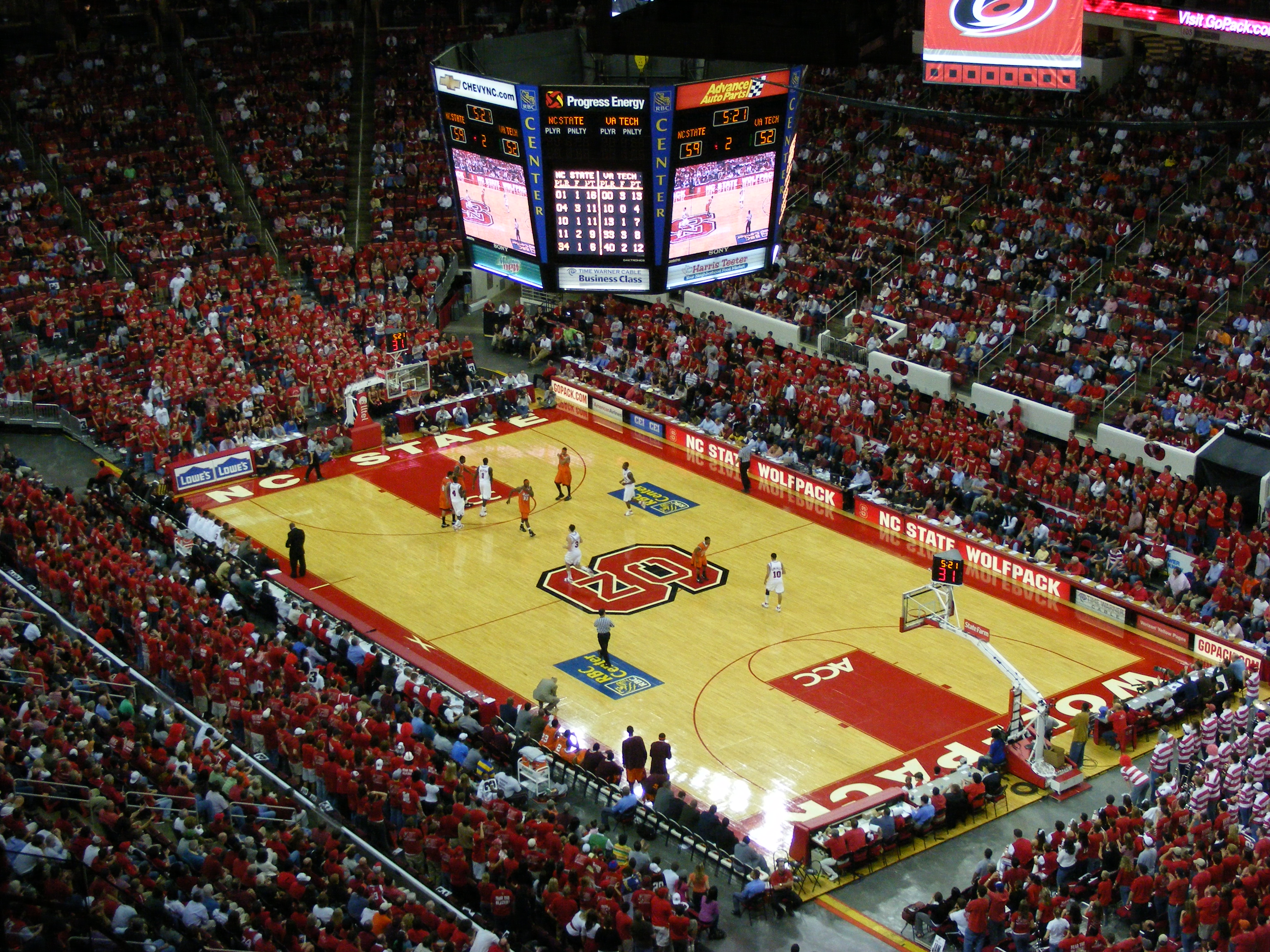
Top: Carter–Finley Stadium
Bottom: Lenovo Center (formerly RBC Center and PNC Arena)

North Carolina State (NC State) teams are known as the Wolfpack. They compete as a member of the National Collegiate Athletic Association (NCAA) Division I level (Football Bowl Subdivision (FBS) sub-level for football), primarily competing in the Atlantic Coast Conference (ACC) for all sports since the 1953–54 season. Men's sports include baseball, basketball, cheerleading, cross country, football, golf, soccer, swimming & diving, tennis, track & field and wrestling; women's sports include basketball, cheerleading, cross country, golf, gymnastics, soccer, softball, swimming and diving, tennis, track & field and volleyball.

NC State has won ten national championships: four NCAA championships, two AIAW championships, and four titles under other sanctioning bodies. Most NC State fans and athletes recognize the rivalry with the North Carolina Tar Heels as their biggest. The Wolfpack also share a minor rivalry with the East Carolina Pirates and Wake Forest Demon Deacons. NC State was a founding member of the Southern Conference and of the Atlantic Coast Conference, and it is one of the four teams on "Tobacco Road".

The primary logo for NC State athletics is a red block "S" with an inscribed "N" and "C'" The block S has been in use since 1890, but has seen many alterations through the years. It became the sole logo for all NC State athletic teams in 2000 and was modernized to its current design in 2006.

NC State athletic teams are nicknamed the "Wolfpack" (most women's teams are also called the "Wolfpack," except for the women's basketball team, who go by the "Wolfpack Women"). The name was unofficially adopted in 1921 following an unsigned letter to the NC State Alumni News suggesting the moniker. Prior to the adoption of the current nickname, NC State athletic teams went by such names as the Aggies, the Techs, and the Red Terrors. Since the 1960s, the Wolfpack has been represented at athletic events by its mascots, Mr. and Mrs. Wuf. In print, the "Strutting Wolf" is used, and is known by the name "Tuffy."

=== Athletic facilities ===
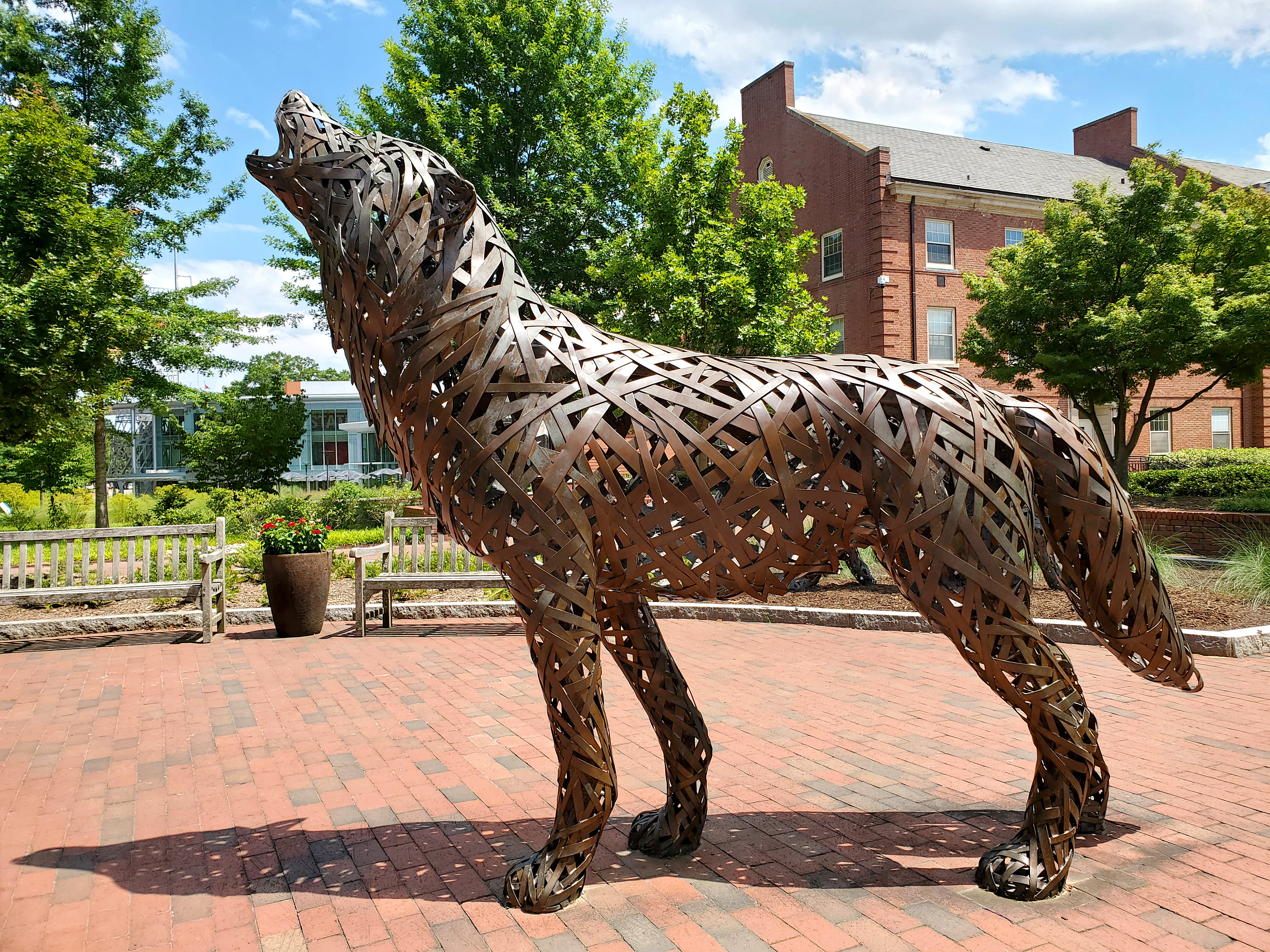
The NCSU mascot is the wolf.

The stadium property is 3.4 mi (5.5 km) northwest of the Memorial Bell Tower. Both Carter–Finley Stadium and the Lenovo Center are located there. Aside from the two stadiums, the property is mainly open space used for event parking. The property borders the North Carolina State Fair to the North and hosts tailgating parties before NC State football games. Located on campus, Reynolds Coliseum is now home to all services of ROTC and several Wolfpack teams, including women's basketball, women's volleyball, women's gymnastics, and men's wrestling.

== Student life ==
Undergraduate demographics as of fall 2023
Race and ethnicity	Total
White	67%
Asian	10%
Hispanic	9%
Black	6%
Two or more races	5%
International student	2%
Unknown	1%
Economic diversity
Low-income (Note: The percentage of students who received an income-based federal Pell grant intended for low-income students.)	20%
Affluent (Note: The percentage of students who are a part of the American middle class at the bare minimum.)	80%

Many residence halls host events, though alcohol policies are strictly enforced.

Witherspoon Student Center (A.K.A. Student Center Annex) houses an African American Cultural Center which has an art gallery and a library. The cultural center moved to its current location in Witherspoon in 1991, having formerly been in the Print Shop. Witherspoon also houses Student Media and a multicultural student affairs office.

Student life at North Carolina State University includes opportunities in a diverse range of activities and organizations. These include multicultural groups, arts groups, political and social action groups, service and professional groups, religious groups, Greek organizations, sports and recreation groups, academic and professional groups, and special interest groups such as the Clogging Team, the Film Society, the Judo Club, the Equestrian Club, the Herpetology Club, and the Black Finesse Modeling Troupe.

=== Residence life ===
Thirty-five percent of full-time undergraduate students live on campus in one of nineteen residence halls. First year students are required to live in University Housing. Most residence halls provide events that acclimate incoming students to the college experience. Many residence halls house villages, such as Honors Village in the Quad, Global Village in Alexander Hall, Engineering Village in Sullivan, Impact Leadership Village in Bowen Hall, WISE in Lee Hall, Arts Village in Turlington Hall, First Year Commons in Owen and Tucker Hall, and Black Male Initiative in Avent Ferry. Each residence hall has an elected council to provide for local event programming and an outlet for student concerns. Collectively, representatives from each hall make up the Inter-Residence Council which represents the on-campus residence-life community as a whole.

University housing facilities are divided into four areas: East Campus, Central Campus, West Campus, and University Apartments.

=== Student government ===
Founded in 1921, NC State Student Government is a student-run organization that serves as the official voice of the student body and attempts to better the student experience at the university. Both a governing body and an advocacy group, Student Government is involved in policy-making, adjudication, programming, advocating, community service, and countless other activities. The organization is a clearinghouse for concerns from students and answers from administrators. The organization also is responsible for distributing a portion of the fees it receives to student organizations in a process known as appropriations. Student organizations must be registered through Student Involvement to become eligible for appropriations.

=== Student traditions ===
==== Service NC State ====
Service NC State (SNCS) is sponsored by the Center for Student Leadership, Ethics & Public Service as the definitive service event to welcome new students to NC State's campus, and as a way to impact the community. This event is open to all students, faculty, staff and the Raleigh community. The event role models the university's mission to impact and support its local and global community.

==== Homecoming Week ====
Homecoming week, an event run by the AASAP (Alumni Association Student Ambassador Program), is one of the only homecoming weeks entirely run by students. Usually at the end of October, starts with a Kickoff event and ends with the Pack Howl pep rally and concert. Featured performers have included Lonestar, Ludacris, Chris Daughtry, and most recently Cartel, Guster and The Avett Brothers.

During the week, events such as Wear Red-Get Fed, a parade down Hillsborough Street, and a campus-wide Spirit Competition take place. The week also includes a Leader of the Pack competition honoring NC State's brightest and most passionate female and male student leaders.

==== Shack-A-Thon ====
Shack-A-Thon, a tradition since 1991, is NC State's Habitat for Humanity's annual fall fundraiser. Habitat for Humanity at NC State's Campus Chapter partners with many other student organizations to take over the Brickyard by building shacks that the students live, sleep, and study in for an entire week. Each group raises money by collecting from people walking through the brickyard and online donations. This money goes toward funding a house through Habitat for Humanity of Wake County. In 2014 students raised over $46,000.

==== Krispy Kreme Challenge ====
Started by Park Scholars, a more recent tradition of NC State is the Krispy Kreme Challenge. In this race, students meet at the university's Memorial Bell Tower, then run to a Krispy Kreme shop 2.5 mi (4.0 km) away (changed from 2 mi (3.2 km) in 2012). Each student must eat twelve glazed doughnuts, then run back to the Bell Tower within one hour. The Challenge was listed as one of the "102 Things You Gotta Do Before You Graduate" by Sports Illustrated. Proceeds from the race go to the NC Children's Hospital. In 2014, 8,000 runners participated and the committee raised $200,000 bringing the cumulative total donated to the NC Children's Hospital to $758,000 since the race's inception. The cumulative total reached $2.1 million in 2023.

=== Student media ===
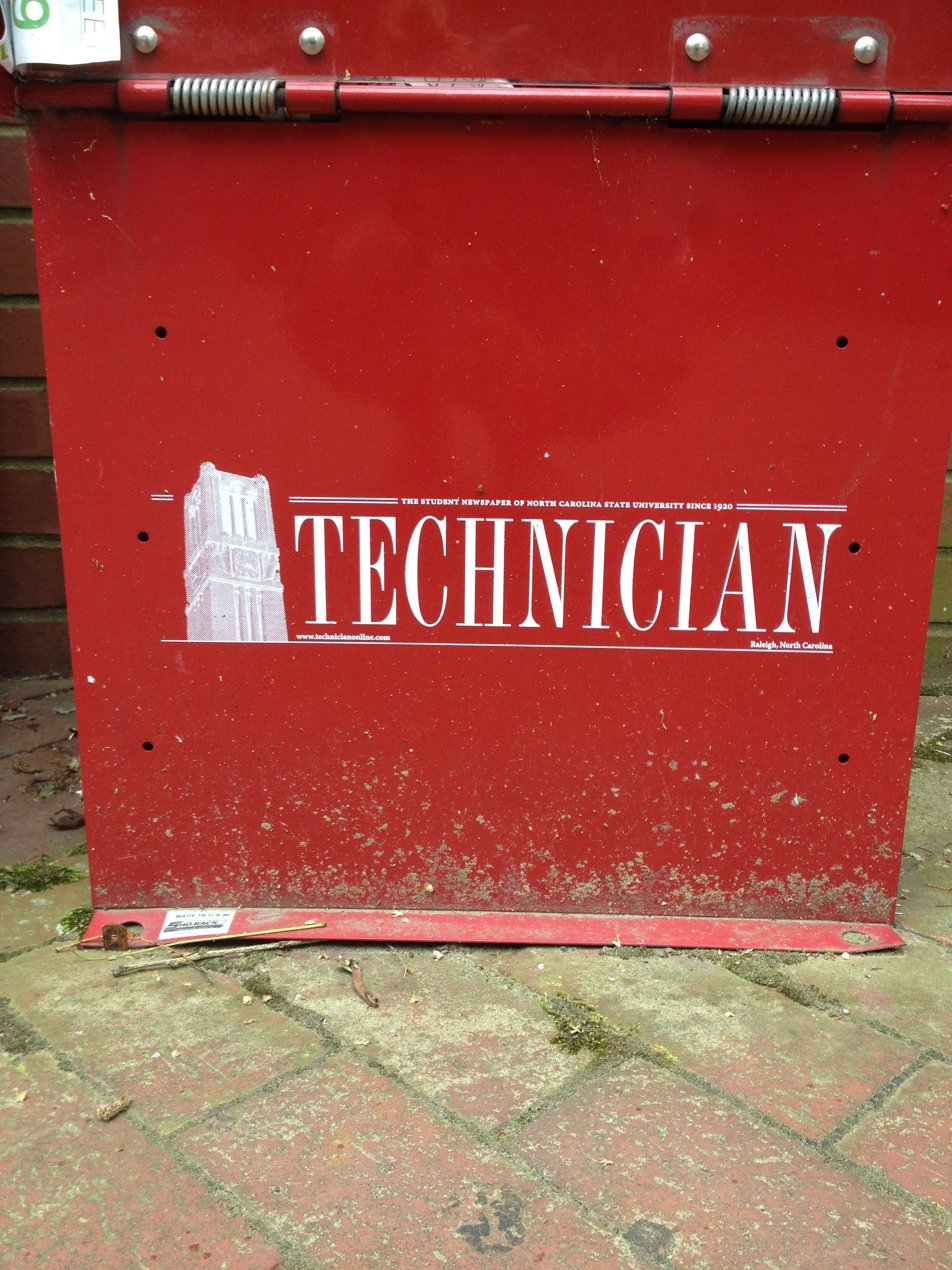
NCSU Technician newspaper stand

Technician has been NC State's student-run newspaper since 1920. It employs students throughout the year and reports on campus news, sports, entertainment, and state and national news. Technician is published Monday through Friday when school is in session with a circulation of about 20,000. The paper is funded by advertisement and a student media fee; it is distributed for free at numerous locations on campus and at area merchants.

The Nubian Message is NC State's African American student newspaper. The Nubian Message was first published in 1992 following protests from many African American students denouncing the Technician's alleged racial bias. The Nubian Message is published biweekly.

NC State's oldest student publication, the Agromeck yearbook, celebrated its 100th birthday with the 2002 edition. It acts as a compendium of student life on campus including sporting events, social activities, and day-to-day living. The yearbook serves as a historian of campus. Each year, nearly 1,000 copies are printed and sold.

The university has its own student-run radio station, WKNC. The radio station broadcasts at 25,000 watts and reaches all corners of "the Triangle" (Raleigh, Durham and Chapel Hill). In 2010, WKNC was voted "Best College Radio Station of the Triangle" by readers of the Independent Weekly. The station hosts several formats run by student disc jockeys. Prior to its designation as WKNC in 1958, the station's call letters were WVWP.

NC State's literary and arts magazine, Windhover, is published once a year in the spring. The publication solicits entries from all university affiliated individuals, including students, staff, alumni, and faculty. The content published includes visual art, writing (prose, poetry, personal narratives, etc.), audio, and video. It was first published in 1964, although the publication was discontinued between the years of 1970 to 1973.

== Notable alumni ==
NC State has 156,297 living alumni, with 61% of alumni living in North Carolina. There are 100 alumni clubs in North Carolina, and another 42 states also have active clubs. A number of NC State alumni and faculty have made significant contributions in the fields of government, military, science, space exploration, academia, business, arts, and athletics, among others.

The first woman to travel around the Moon, NASA astronaut Christina Koch, earned two bachelor's degrees, in Electrical Engineering and Physics, and a Master's of Science in Electrical Engineering at North Carolina State. As a crew member of the 2026 Artemis II lunar flyby mission, Koch took the photograph Earthset.

Among the most notable alumni with involvement in politics are John Edwards, former U.S. senator and two-time presidential candidate; James B. Hunt Jr., 4-term governor of North Carolina; Nida Allam, the first Muslim woman to be elected to a North Carolina government office; and Robert Gibbs, former White House press secretary.

Combining science and politics, Rajendra Kumar Pachauri was the elected chief of the Intergovernmental Panel on Climate Change (IPCC), an organization that shared the 2007 Nobel Peace Prize with Al Gore; Pachauri represented the IPCC in receiving the award. Abdurrahim El-Keib was the interim prime minister of Libya from November 24, 2011, to November 14, 2012. Alumnus Munir Ahmad Khan gained international recognition for his work in reactor quantum physics, and later guided the scientific research in nuclear weapons for Pakistan's atomic bomb programs.

Khalia Braswell, computer scientist, technologist, and founder of INTech, earned her bachelor's degree from NC State in computer science.

Several alumni have held top positions at large companies. These include Apple Inc. (Jeff Williams, chief operating officer), Caterpillar Inc. (James W. Owens), SAS Institute (James Goodnight, president and CEO), Tractor Supply (Hal Lawton, president and CEO), and HowStuffWorks (Marshall Brain).

Over 60 NC State alumni have achieved the rank of brigadier general, rear admiral, or higher in the United States military. General William C. Lee is often referred to as the "father of the U.S. Airborne." General Maxwell R. Thurman, a former Vice Chief of Staff of the U.S. Army, was the first four-star officer from NCSU. Hugh Shelton, now retired, was a former chairman of the Joint Chiefs of Staff and a four-star general. General Dan McNeill commanded the International Security Assistance Force in Afghanistan. NC state alum Major General Michelle Mills Rose was promoted to general from the Virginia Army National Guard. Nominated to be the 34th chief of Naval Operations, Admiral Daryl Caudle, is 1985 NCSU graduate.

Some alumni have become national academic leaders. Albert Carnesale was the chancellor of UCLA from 1997 to 2006 after a 23-year tenure at Harvard University. Bill Friday was president of the University of North Carolina system for 30 years. William Brantley Aycock was chancellor of the University of North Carolina at Chapel Hill from 1957 until 1964.

Notable contributors to the entertainment industry are associated with NC State. Actor and comedian Zach Galifianakis attended NC State. Country singer and American Idol winner Scotty McCreery attends NC State University. Donald Bitzer, the father of plasma television and Emmy Award winner, sat on the faculty. Musician and entertainment personality John Tesh also studied at NC State, but was expelled his junior year. Comedians and self-proclaimed "Internetainers" Rhett and Link also attended NC State.

=== Athletes ===
Several NC State students have become professional athletes. Bill Cowher coached 15 seasons with the Pittsburgh Steelers football team, including the Super Bowl XL championship team; he is a studio analyst for The NFL Today. Over 130 NC State alumni play or have played in the NFL. Notable former players include Philip Rivers, Don Buckey, Torry Holt, Roman Gabriel, Ted Brown, Dick Christy, Perry Williams, Haywood Jeffires, Vaughan Johnson, Jerry Punch, Jim Ritcher, Koren Robinson, Dewayne Washington, Jerricho Cotchery, Tank Tyler, and 2006 number one pick Mario Williams. Notable current players include Bradley Chubb of the Miami Dolphins; Nyheim Hines of the Cleveland Browns; Garrett Bradbury of the Minnesota Vikings; Jacoby Brissett of the New England Patriots, Russell Wilson of the Pittsburgh Steelers. Willie Burden was a star player in the Canadian Football League, and is a member of the Canadian Football Hall of Fame.

Another 41 alumni have played for the NBA, including Naismith Hall of Fame member David Thompson and players Tom Gugliotta, Kenny Carr, Spud Webb, Cedric Simmons, Julius Hodge, J.J. Hickson, Josh Powell, T. J. Warren, Dennis Smith Jr., and Thurl Bailey. Former Wolfpack player Nate McMillan played in the NBA and was formerly the head coach of the Atlanta Hawks and Indiana Pacers, whilst another former Wolfpack player, Vinny Del Negro, both played and coached in the NBA. Justine Lindsay, the first transgender National Football League cheerleader, is also an alumna of NC State. Patrick Bailey is a catcher with the Cleveland Guardians. Trea Turner is an all star infielder for the Philadelphia Phillies.

=== Gallery ===
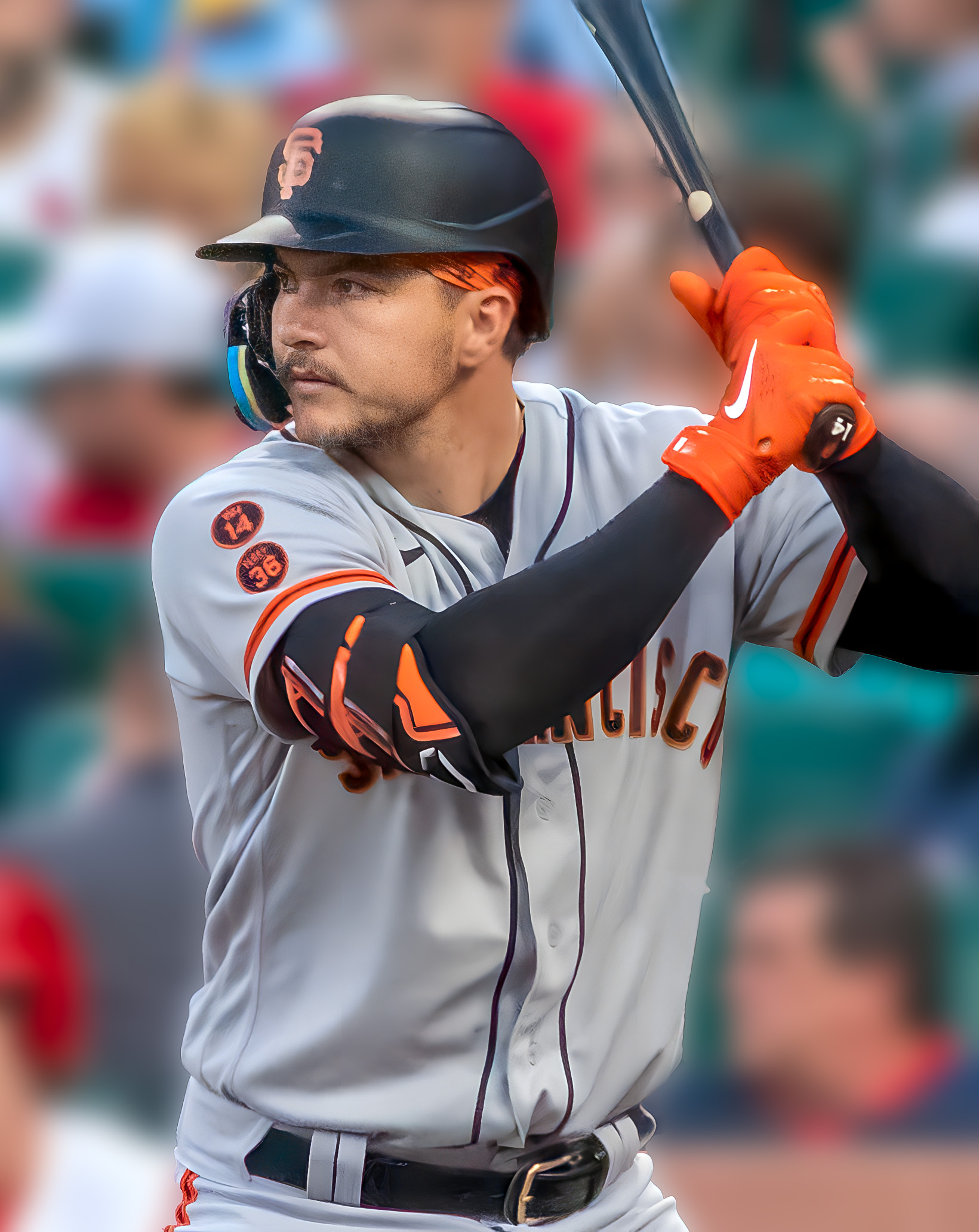
Patrick Bailey, major league catcher

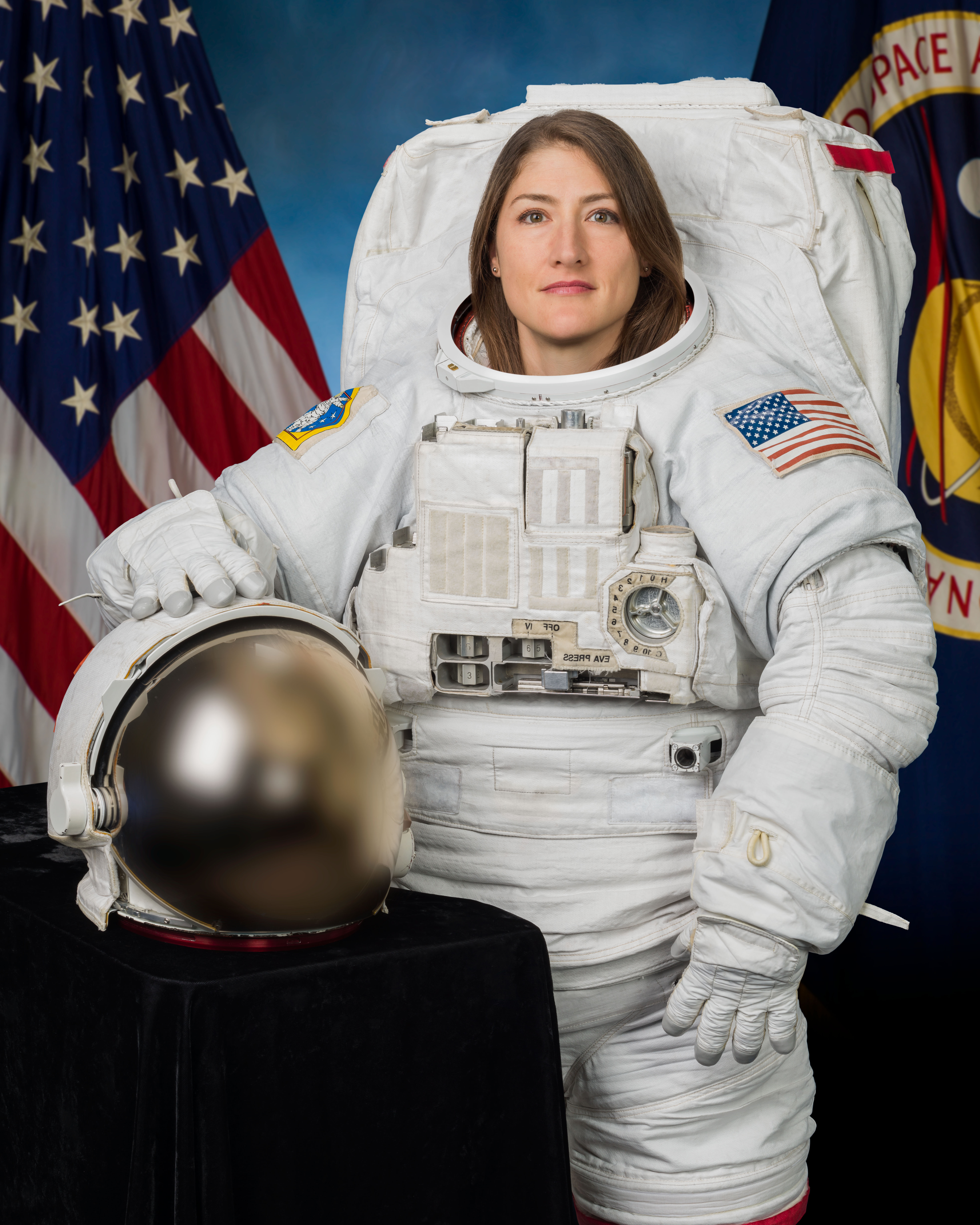
Christina Koch, astronaut, first woman to travel around the Moon

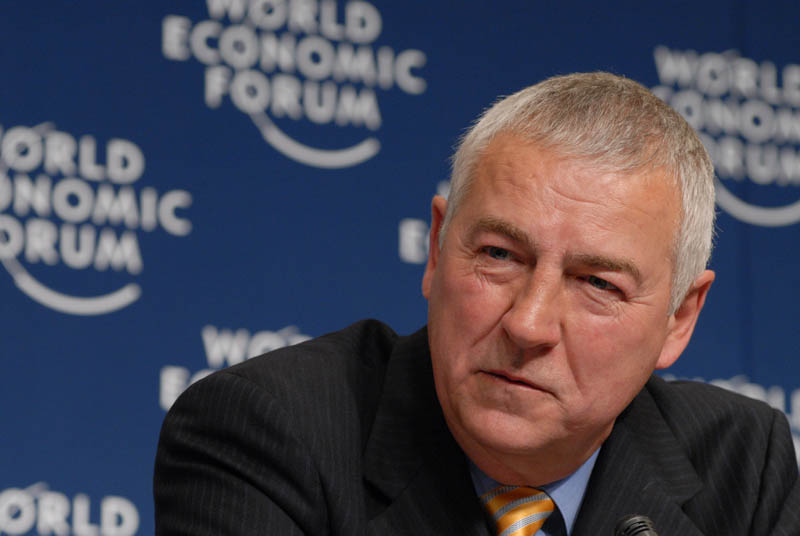
Jim Goodnight, founder of SAS Institute

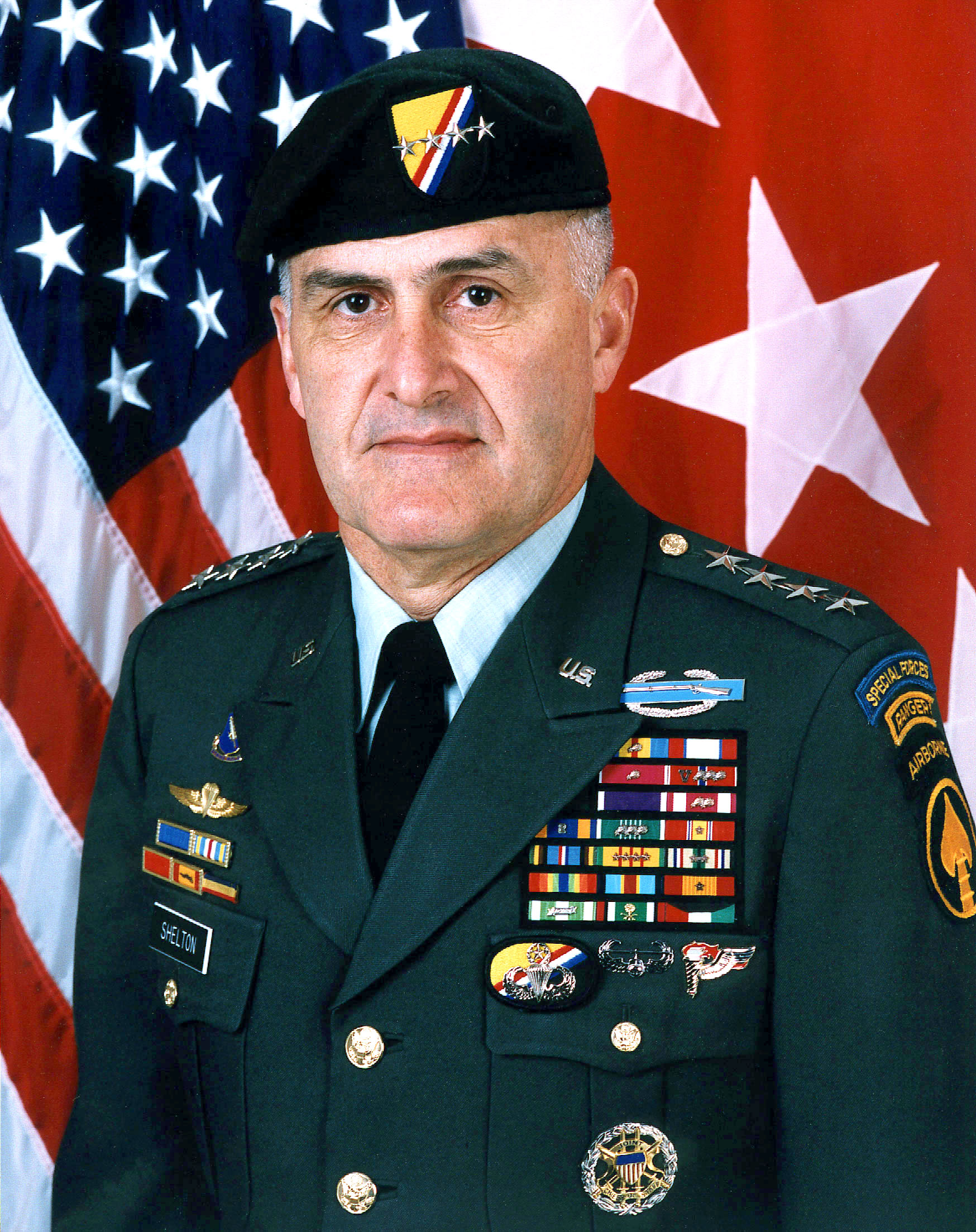
Henry H. Shelton, former chairman of the U.S. Armed Forces Joint Chiefs of Staff

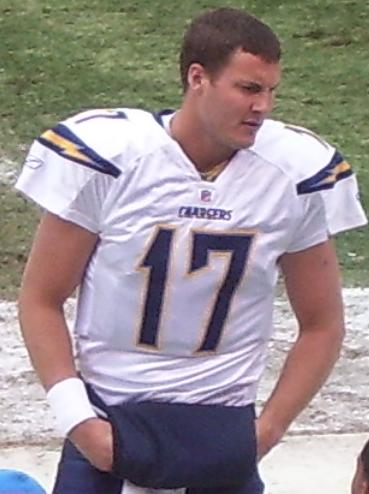
Philip Rivers, former NFL quarterback and Pro Bowler

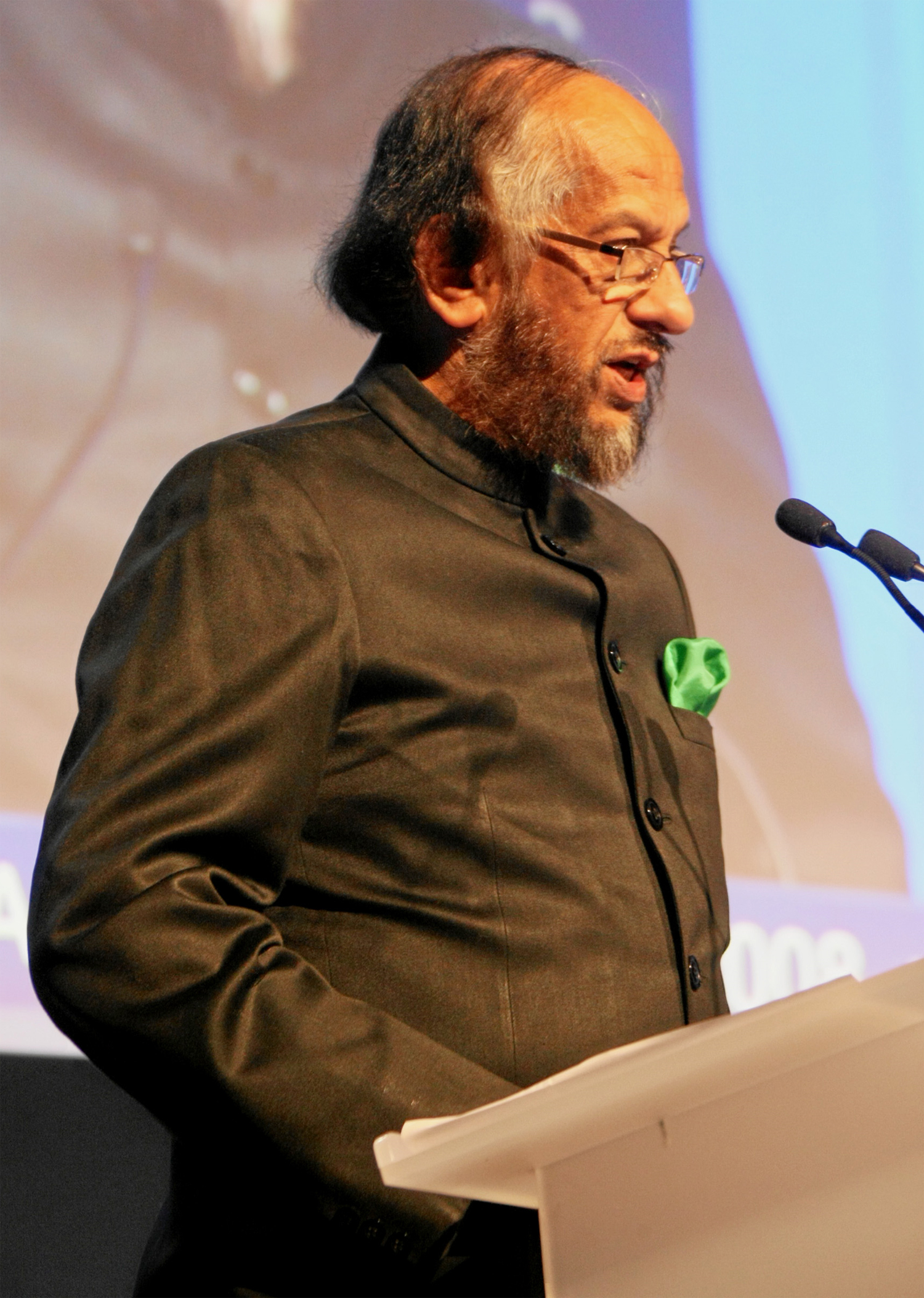
Rajendra Kumar Pachauri, former chair of the UN Intergovernmental Panel on Climate Change

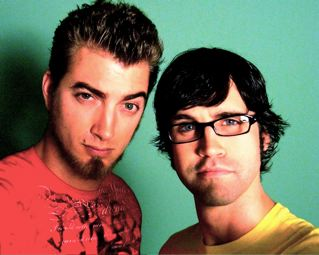
Rhett and Link, two comedians who host the morning internet show Good Mythical Morning

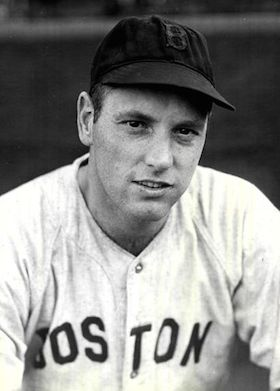
Ben Steiner, professional baseball player for the Boston Red Sox 1945-1946

== See also ==
- University Statisticians of the Southern Experiment Stations
- Education in North Carolina
- Tobacco Road Rivalry
- Research Triangle
- List of colleges and universities in North Carolina
