= Kevin Howell =

15th Chancellor of North Carolina State University

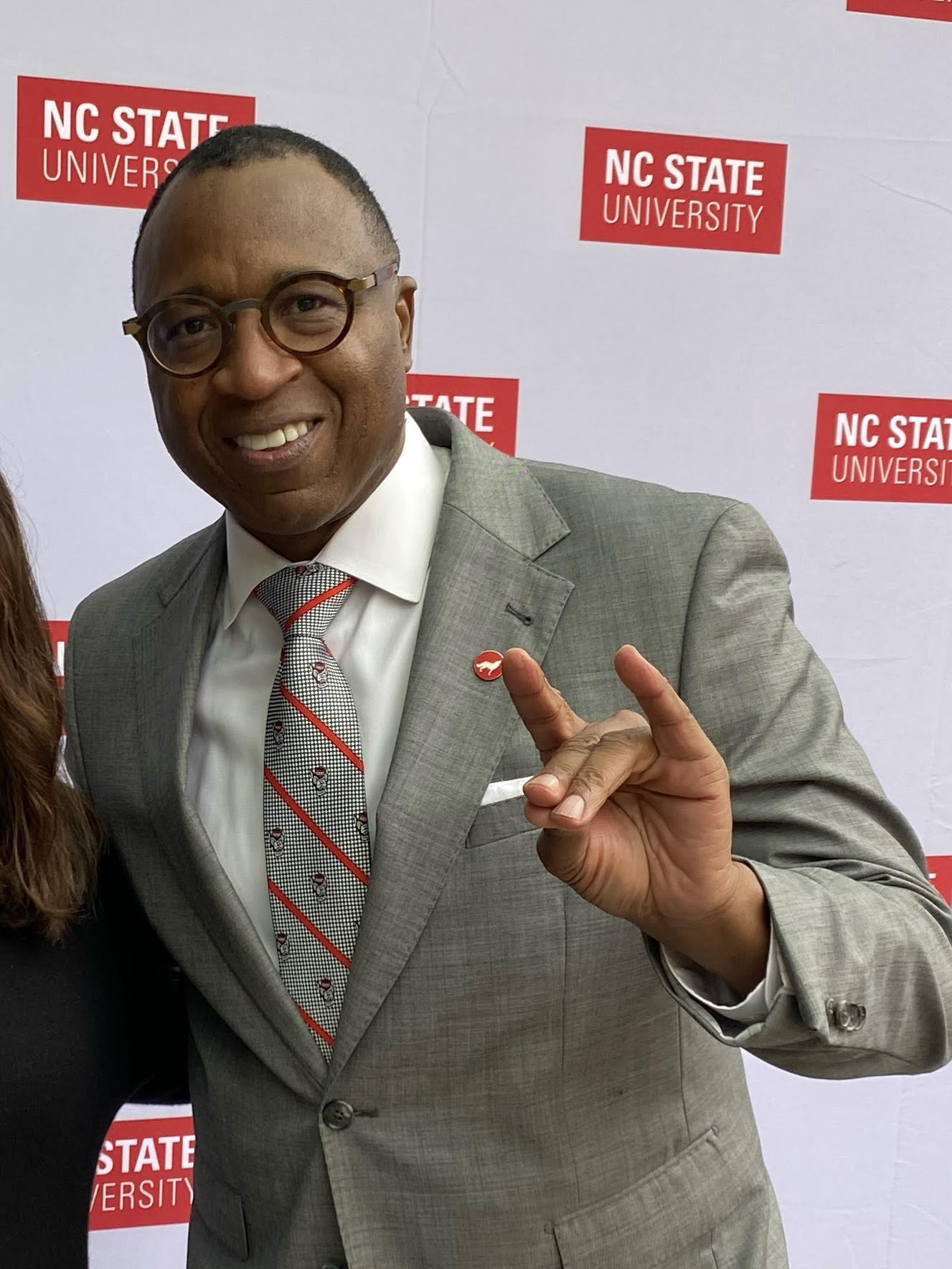
- Howell in 2025

15th chancellor of North Carolina State University
- Incumbent
- Assumed office May 5, 2025
- Preceded by: Randy Woodson

Personal details
- Born: Shelby, North Carolina
- Party: Democratic
- Spouse: Aleta Howell
- Children: 2
- Education: North Carolina State University (B. S.); UNC Chapel Hill (J. D.)

Kevin D. Howell is a law and political science graduate who has served in a number of leadership positions in the U.S. state of North Carolina. He was sworn in as the 15th chancellor of North Carolina State University (NCSU) on May 5, 2025, replacing the previous chancellor of fifteen years Randy Woodson. His assumption to the role marks the first black chancellor and first chancellor to not have served an academia career in the university's history.

Howell was born in Shelby, North Carolina. He graduated NCSU with a bachelor's degree in political science in 1988, and the University of North Carolina at Chapel Hill with a Juris Doctor in law in 1992. After working as a liaison for the North Carolina General Assembly under the state governors Jim Hunt and Mike Easley, Howell returned to work for NCSU in 2006 as the Assistant to the Chancellor for External Affairs. After a brief departure from the university in 2024, Howell returned nearly a year later to assume the role as chancellor, after being nominated by the UNC System President Peter Hans. In a statement, Hans stated he supported the nomination of Howell as he believed he could handle the ongoing scandals regarding cancer-causing Polychlorinated biphenyl (PCBs) discovered on campus, potential cuts to research spending under the second presidency of Donald Trump, and other challenges upon taking office. According to a report by the university's student newspaper Technician, much of the student body positively regards Howell.

== Education and career ==
After studying political science at North Carolina State University (NCSU), Howell earned his bachelor's degree in the field in 1988. During his senior year from 1987–1988, Howell also served as the first black student body president of NCSU. Howell won against six other candidates by more than 50% of the vote, after a runoff election was called. Howell then graduated, and switched to studying law at the University of North Carolina at Chapel Hill, where he earned his Juris Doctor in the field in 1992. Between 1988 and 2006, Howell started his career as a legal clerk for the North Carolina Court of Appeals, and later worked as a liaison for the North Carolina General Assembly under democratic Governors Jim Hunt and Mike Easley.

In 2006, Howell left his other jobs to return to work at NCSU in various leadership positions. From 2006 to 2016, Howell served as the NCSU's Assistant to the Chancellor for External Affairs. Overlapping with the main position, Howell also served as the Associate Vice Chancellor for Alumni Affairs at NCSU from 2009 to 2010 and interim Vice Chancellor for University Advancement at NCSU from 2013 to 2014. Afterwards, Howell served as the head of the UNC System's Division of External Affairs from 2016 to 2018, Vice Chancellor for External Affairs, Partnerships and Economic Development from 2018 to 2023. Starting February 1, 2024, Howell announced his departure from NCSU once again to take a position as the Chief External Affairs Officer for UNC Health and the UNC School of Medicine. Then-chancellor of NCSU Randy Woodson announced Howell "will be greatly missed", regarding the help he brought to him and towards building relations with local and federal officials as particularly impactful. In 2025, Howell was also serving as a member on the directors board for the UNC Law School Foundation, on the advisory board for the Friday Institute for Educational Innovation at NCSU, of the North Carolina Symphony, on the executive committee of the Greater Raleigh Chamber of Commerce, on the executive committee of myFutureNC, and on the executive committee of the Association of Public and Land-grant Universities' Commission on Economic & Community Engagement.

=== Assumption as chancellor ===
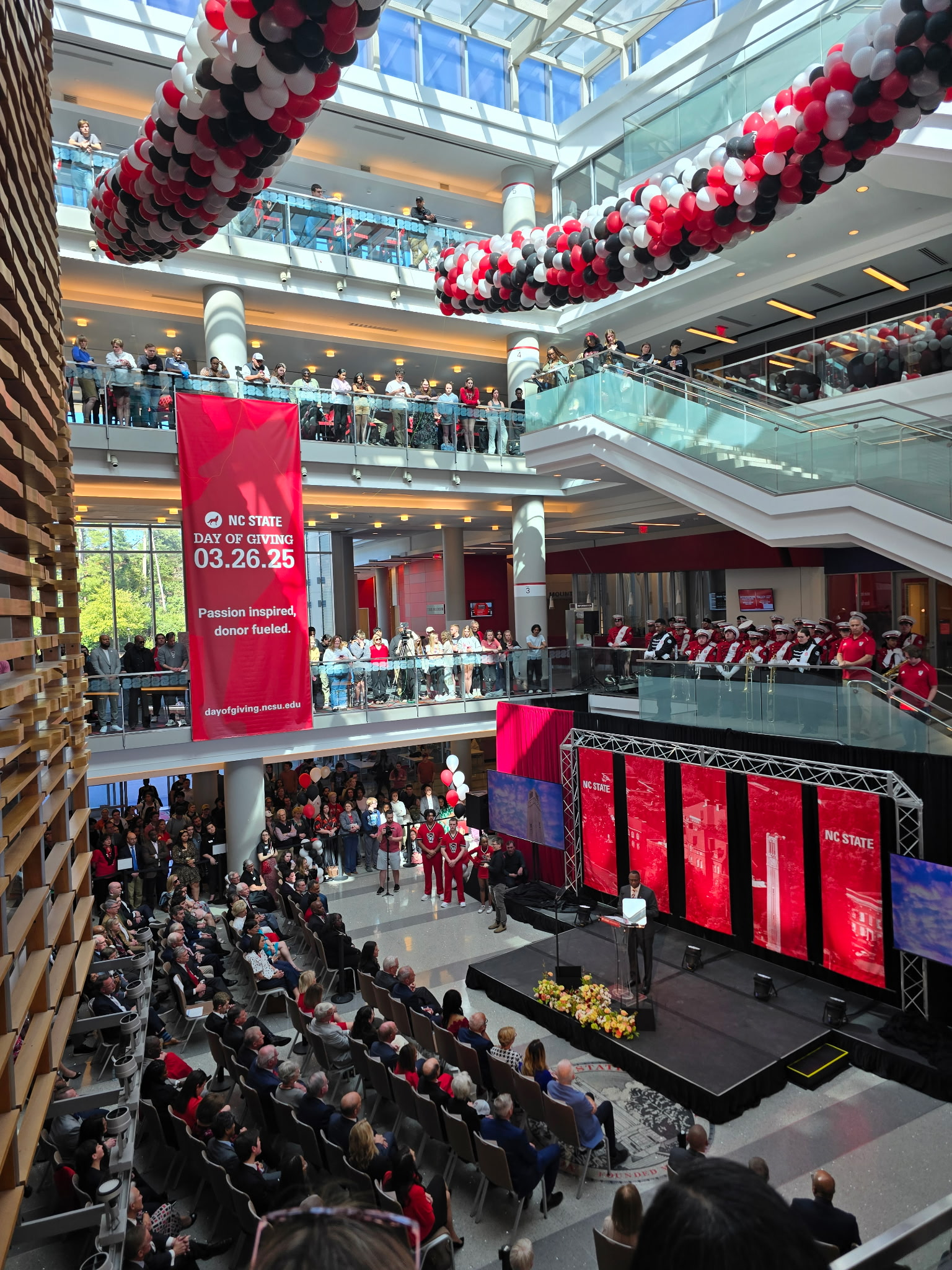
Howell's speech as chancellor-elect in Talley Student Union in March 2025

Despite Howell's departure from NCSU on February 1, 2024, only around a year later on March 12, 2025, information was first rumored that Howell was to return to the university to replace Woodson as the next chancellor. Woodson, who by this point had served as the university's chancellor for 15 years, confirmed the news on March 18. The assumption of the position made Howell the first black chancellor of the university, first chancellor to not have served as a career academic, and first chancellor since 1998 to also be a university alumni. Howell also assumed office over the largest student body of the 17 universities in the UNC school system, which NCSU held with 39,000 students at the time. Howell's assumption was made official by the UNC System Board of Governors, after he was nominated by the system's President Peter Hans, and was among four finalists endorsed by the Board of Trustees. Hans reiterated his approval for Howell in a statement that he was "well-suited to the greatest challenge that higher education faces in our fraught moment", referring to scandals regarding the diagnosis of more than 200 people with cancer traced back to Polychlorinated biphenyl (PCBs) found in Poe Hall and other areas of NCSU's campus, potential cuts to research spending as part of the second presidency of Donald Trump, and other challenges Howell would have to face upon taking office.

Howell assumed the position of chancellor on May 5, 2025, with a starting salary of US$600,000. According to a report by the university's student newspaper Technician, much of the student body positively regarded Howell, particularly from his early interactions with students after the announcement, and his history as an alumni and leader at the university.

== Personal life ==
Kevin D. Howell was born in Shelby, North Carolina in Cleveland County. He is married to Aleta Howell, and has two daughters, one of whom was a 2023 NCSU College of Textiles graduate. On October 30, 2015, a blood test diagnosed Howell with double kidney failures, a condition which became nearly fatal for him. On February 2, 2016, Howell received a transplant kidney from an assistant of Chancellor Woodson, Lindsay Recchie, an action which both saved his life and led Recchie to receive Governor's Award for Excellence.
