= Mary Ann Lila =

American activist

Mary Ann Lila is the director of North Carolina State University's Plants for Human Health Institute (PHHI) located at the North Carolina Research Campus in Kannapolis, North Carolina. The institute is part of North Carolina State's College of Agriculture and Life Sciences. In her role with PHHI, Lila is a David H. Murdock Distinguished Professor and part of North Carolina State's Department of Food, Bioprocessing and Nutrition Sciences. She is a researcher and has been called "the rock star of blueberry research."

Lila's research program, called the "LilaLab," focuses on identifying and understanding the bioactive components of fruits and vegetables that confer human health benefits when consumed. Her lab works to identify these compounds and define the protective mechanisms which will ultimately lead to recommendations for how much or how often a food would need to be consumed to confer health benefits. In doing so, she hopes to develop and discover ways to counteract chronic diseases, promote endurance and protect human health. She specializes in berries, like blueberries, black currants and cranberries, but also investigates other food crops.

Lila has ongoing research projects in Africa, Asia, North America and Oceania, and is vice president of the Global Institute for BioExploration (GIBEX). In 1999, Lila won a Fulbright Senior Scholarship to conduct research and outreach in New Zealand.

Previous to North Carolina State, Lila was a professor at the University of Illinois Urbana-Champaign. She is an author of about 200 published journal articles, books and chapters. Under Lila's direction, the Plants for Human Health Institute has received more than $10 million in gift donations and competitive grants.

Lila has a Bachelor of Science in horticultural science and a Master of Science in plant pathology, both from the College of Agricultural, Consumer and Environmental Sciences at the University of Illinois Urbana-Champaign and a Ph.D from the University of Wisconsin–Madison. She has served as the U.S. correspondent for the International Association of Plant Biotechnology, President of the Society for In Vitro Biology, Director of the ACES Global Connect – the international arm of the College of Agricultural, Consumer and Environmental Sciences at the University of Illinois Urbana-Champaign, and associate director of the Functional Foods for Health Program.
