= Roy H. Park =

American media executive and entrepreneur

- Born: September 15, 1910; Dobson, North Carolina, US
- Died: October 25, 1993 (aged 83); New York City, US
- Education: North Carolina State University
- Known for: Duncan Hines; Park Communications; Park Foundation; Triad Foundation
- Spouse: Dorothy D. Park
- Children: 2

Roy Hampton Park (September 15, 1910 – October 25, 1993) was an American entrepreneur and media mogul. He is known for creating the Duncan Hines brand of packaged food products, and for his television/radio/newspaper conglomerate, Park Communications. He created the Park Foundation, which has funded many programs in his name at Ithaca College, Cornell University, and North Carolina State University.

== Biography ==
Park was born in Dobson, North Carolina, the son of a tenant farmer. He began writing for two local North Carolina newspapers at the age of 12; although he suffered a severe bout with rheumatic fever at 13, Park graduated from Dobson High School at the age of 15 and followed his brother to North Carolina State University.

After crashing his brother's automobile, Park took his first job to pay off the damages; this job was at the local Associated Press bureau, where he worked his way up from office boy to reporter by the time of this graduation from college. He also wrote for the college's student newspaper, Technician, and extended his term of study at college so that he could serve as the paper's editor-in-chief. Upon graduation in 1931 with a degree in business administration, he was awarded the senior superlative of "Best Writer."

After graduation, Park accepted the position of public relations director for the North Carolina Cotton Growers Cooperative Association; there, he pioneered innovative ways of promoting cotton, including "Cotton Balls," with dancers and performers dressed in cotton formal wear. In 1936, he married Dorothy Goodwin Dent, one of the "Maids of Cotton," whom he met prior to these events.

At the Cotton Cooperative, Park founded and published three periodicals, the Carolina Cooperator, the Rural Electrification Guide, and Cooperative Digest and Farm Power, which attracted the attention of H. E. Babcock, the founder of the Grange League Federation. Babcock offered Park a position at the agency, in Ithaca, New York, which Park accepted in 1942.

== Duncan Hines ==
In the late 1940s, the Grange approached Park to find a way to market their excess food products; Park approached well-known food critic Duncan Hines to lend his name to a brand of packaged food products. The resulting company, Hines-Park Foods, was a stunning success in the American food market, especially with its flagship product, Duncan Hines Cake Mix. Only five years after releasing its first products, Hines-Park was acquired by Procter & Gamble in 1956 for 360,000 shares of Procter & Gamble stock and an undisclosed amount of cash. Park stayed with Procter & Gamble as a senior executive until 1962.

== Park Communications ==
After selling Duncan Hines, Park began to look around for new business opportunities. In 1961, he used his shares of Procter & Gamble as collateral to acquire two radio stations in North Carolina and established Park Broadcasting, Inc. He left Procter & Gamble the following year and began rapidly purchasing other radio and TV stations. In 1972, he started purchasing newspapers; five years later, he owned 40 of them. Most of his acquisitions were in small to medium-sized markets, far away from big cities.

"Park saw gold in owning broadcast stations," said his longtime deputy Johnny Babcock. "They are reasonably invulnerable to competition, not overburdened with depreciable assets, high profile in their community, and while regulated by the government, the franchise for the assigned frequency on the airwaves is protected by Uncle Sam." Park's TV stations operated at a 45% profit margin, with radio in the high 30s, "outdoor billboards in the low 30s, newspapers in the mid to high 20s. A big grocery retailer does well to turn a profit of 2-3 percent; industrial concerns score success if they exceed 10 percent operating profit. Broadcasting was a pretty fat cat."

By 1977, Park had become the first broadcaster to acquire seven television stations, seven AM radio, and seven FM radio stations—the legal limit at the time. In 1983, Congress relaxed limits on ownership, and Park resumed buying. Park changed the name of the company and went public in 1983, selling 10% of his shares and retaining 90% of the company. At the time of his death, Park Communications controlled 21 radio stations, seven television stations, and 144 publications; the company's market reach was estimated at one-quarter of all American households and employed over 3,000 people. Throughout his lifetime, Park had no interest in selling his media assets, saying that he was always a buyer and never a seller.

After his death, Park Communications was bought for $710 million by a pair of investors using a loan from the Retirement Systems of Alabama. It was resold in 1996 to Media General. In 2017, Media General was sold to the current Nexstar Media Group.

== Other ==
Park lived in the Ithaca, New York area for the remainder of his life, having purchased a stone mansion on seven acres in Cayuga Heights in the mid-1950s. He maintained connections to his native state, sitting on the Board of Visitors for the University of North Carolina at Chapel Hill School of Journalism and Mass Communication, and on the Board of Trustees of North Carolina State University. In 1989, the state of North Carolina presented him with its highest civilian honor, the North Carolina Award.

In addition to his media holdings, Park owned a number of rental properties in Ithaca, timberland in North Carolina, and was a major shareholder in both Procter & Gamble and the Tompkins County Trust Company, owning 7% of the latter at his death. He also owned a billboard and outdoor advertising business that he eventually sold to his son.

Park was actively involved with Ithaca College, joining its board of trustees in 1973 and serving as chairman from 1981 to 1992. In 1989, the college's media school was renamed the Roy H. Park School of Communications. The college's School of Business is housed in the Dorothy D. and Roy H. Park Center, which opened in 2008.

At Cornell University, he sat on the Advisory Council of the Johnson Graduate School of Management and endowed the Lewis H. Durland Memorial Lecture Series, which brings a prominent business leader to campus every year. (Durland, the longtime university treasurer, was a friend of Park.)

Park died in 1993 from a heart attack in New York City.

== Philanthropy ==
In 1966, Park created the Park Foundation as an outlet for his philanthropic interests. After his death, a substantial percentage of his wealth went to the foundation.

The foundation quickly ran into trouble, with Park's two children (one liberal, one conservative) disagreeing about which causes to support. In 2001, Dorothy Park divided the foundation in two. She, along with her daughter Adelaide Gomer and Gomer's daughter, continued to operate the Park Foundation, whereas Park Jr. and his children took over the spun-off Triad Foundation.

In 2010, with Dorothy Park suffering from advanced Alzheimer's, her two children sued each other after disagreeing over whose foundation should get the bulk of her estimated $220-million estate. (Dorothy Park died in 2016, at 103.)

The Park Foundation supports a myriad of causes including higher education, media and public awareness, and environmental protection. Among their largest contributions include the Park Scholarships program at North Carolina State University and the Park Scholar program at Ithaca College within the Park School of Communications. In addition, the Dorothy and Roy Park Alumni Center at North Carolina State was named after the couple.

== Awards and honors ==
- 1970: NC State Alumni Association Meritorious Service Award
- 1971: Abe Lincoln Award from the Southern Baptist's Radio and Television Commission
- 1975: Watauga Medal, NC State's highest honor
- 1978: NC State honors Park with an Honorary Doctor of Humanities degree
- 1982: North Carolina Broadcasting Hall of Fame
- 1984: Golden Plate Award of the American Academy of Achievement
- 1989: North Carolina Award
- 1989: Ithaca College in New York dedicates its communications building in his honor
- 1990: University of North Carolina School of Journalism Hall of Fame
- 1992: NC State University Centennial Award
