= Triad Foundation =

- Triad Foundation, Inc.
- Formation: 2003
- Founder: Roy H. Park, Sr.
- Headquarters: 15 Ascot Place
- Location: Ithaca, New York
- Methods: Grant-making
- Chairman & President: Roy H. Park, Jr.
- Secretary: Elizabeth Park Fowler
- Treasurer: Roy Park III
- Key people: Elizabeth Park
- Affiliations: Park Foundation

The Triad Foundation is an American nonprofit foundation formed in 2003 as a spin-off of the Park Foundation. The triad in the newer foundation's title refers to Park Jr. and his children Roy Park III and Elizabeth Park Fowler. The foundation's endowment comes from the estate of entrepreneur and media mogul Roy H. Park.

The foundation supports a series of Roy H. Park Fellowships at Cornell University's Samuel Curtis Johnson Graduate School of Management and at University of North Carolina at Chapel Hill's School of Journalism and Mass Communication.

It is based in Ithaca, New York and is chaired by Park's son, Roy H. Park, Jr.

At the end of 2013, the foundation reported having $291 million in assets.
