= William L. Roper =

American physician (born 1948)

William Roper
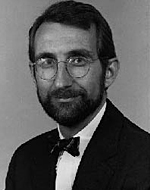

President of the University of North Carolina
- Acting
- In office January 1, 2019 – August 1, 2020
- Preceded by: Margaret Spellings
- Succeeded by: Peter Hans

12th Director of the Centers for Disease Control and Prevention
- In office March 1, 1990 – June 30, 1993
- President: George H. W. Bush; Bill Clinton
- Preceded by: James O. Mason
- Succeeded by: David Satcher

Personal details
- Born: 1948 (age 76–77)
- Education: University of Alabama (MD, MPH)

William L. Roper (born 1948) is an American physician who was the director of the Centers for Disease Control and Prevention (CDC) from 1990 to 1993, when he was asked to step down over controversy about his response to the AIDS crisis.

After leaving the CDC, he joined the faculty at the University of North Carolina at Chapel Hill, and then was CEO of UNC Health Care. He was the dean of the UNC Gillings School of Global Public Health and the UNC School of Medicine before being appointed interim president of the University of North Carolina in January 2019. In June 2020, it was announced that he would be succeeded by Peter Hans in August.

Roper received his medical and master of public health degrees from the University of Alabama School of Medicine.

A former White House Fellow and head of the Health Care Financing Administration, he was moved from his position as head of the Office of Policy Development in the White House to the CDC at the beginning of March 1990. He is on the global Advisory Council for CFK Africa, an NGO working in Kenyan informal settlements.

Government offices
Preceded by James O. Mason	Director of the Centers for Disease Control and Prevention; 1990–1993	Succeeded by David Satcher
Academic offices
Preceded by Margaret Spellings	President of the University of North Carolina; Acting; 2019–2020	Succeeded by Peter Hans
