= Plants for Human Health Institute =

Plant Research institute in Kannapolis, North Carolina

Coordinates: 35.501486°N 80.624012°W

- Established: October 20, 2008
- Research type: Interdisciplinary
- Director: Mary Ann Lila
- Location: 600 Laureate Way, Kannapolis, North Carolina, United States
- Campus: North Carolina Research Campus
- Affiliations: North Carolina State University
- Website: plantsforhumanhealth.ncsu.edu

The Plants for Human Health Institute (PHHI) is a North Carolina State University based research and education organization located at the North Carolina Research Campus in Kannapolis, North Carolina, United States. The PHHI researches food crops, like fruits and vegetables, and the potential health-promoting properties they may convey when consumed.

The PHHI is part of the university's College of Agriculture and Life Sciences; its staff consists of faculty from the following departments: horticultural science, food, bioprocessing and nutrition sciences; plant and microbial biology, genetics, and agricultural and resource economics. The PHHI has both research and Cooperative Extension components.

Mary Ann Lila, a blueberry researcher, is the current director of the PHHI.

== History ==
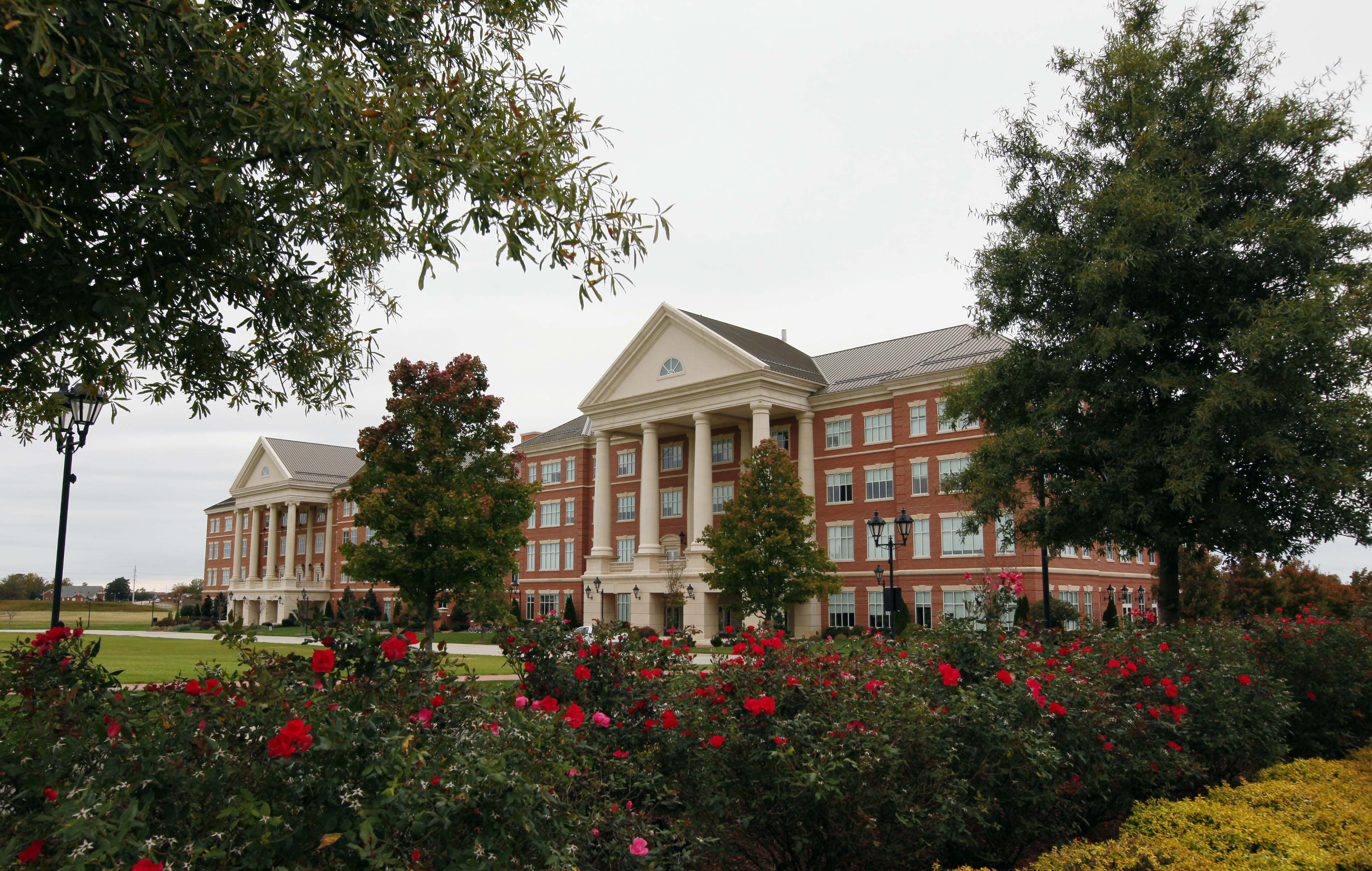
The Plants for Human Health Institute building at the N.C. Research Campus, Kannapolis, N.C.

N.C. State began operations in Kannapolis in 2007 as the Fruit and Vegetable Science Institute. The university was one of the first organizations to join the biotech hub.

The program's name was changed to Plants for Human Health Institute when the N.C. Research Campus was dedicated on October 20, 2008, in order "to more accurately reflect the ground-breaking research approach the institute will take. Institute research will focus on identifying and making available to consumers bioactive compounds in plants that prevent and treat disease."

As of February 2024, PHHI has about 11 faculty and 70 staff in Kannapolis, not including seasonal staff.

== Research ==
=== Overview ===
Plants for Human Health Institute researchers study the potential health-promoting properties of fruits and vegetables. The institute employs twelve lead researchers.

The institute's mission is to discover and deliver plant-based solutions to improve human health, PHHI researchers target naturally occurring chemical compounds in plants and fresh produce, known as phytochemicals, some of which convey health-promoting properties when ingested. The director, Dr. Lila, and other PHHI researchers have done research into phytochemicals, such as anthocyanins present in blueberries and other crops, indicating they provide health benefits against cancer, diabetes, and other chronic human diseases when consumed.

In 2013, Dr. Lila was a lead researcher in a study involving athletes ingesting blueberry and green tea-infused drinks twice daily during a two-week supplementation period and then for three days of rigorous exercise. Among the results, participants experienced a prolonged spike in their metabolism (up to 14 hours) after exercise.

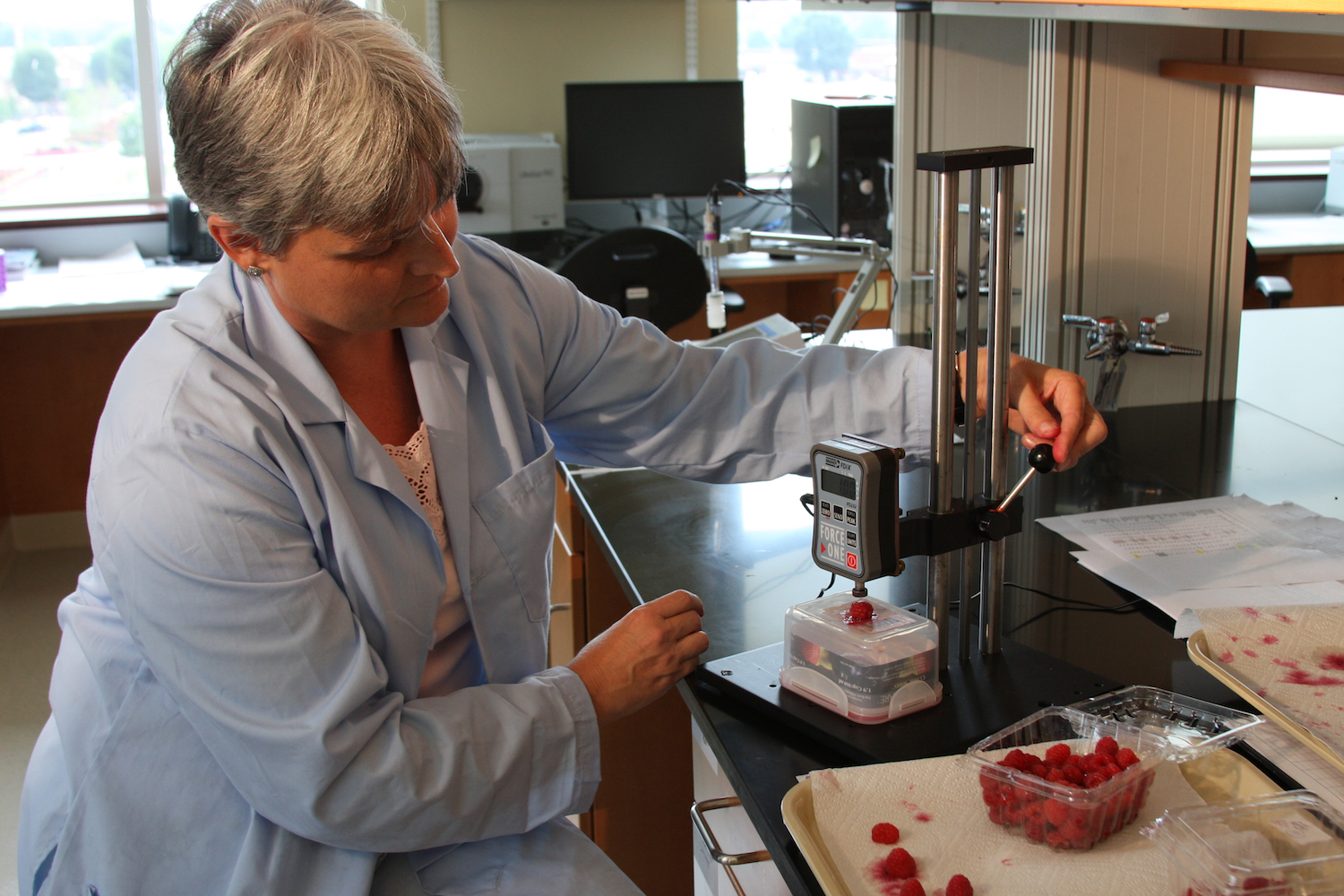
Penelope Perkins - Veazie, post harvest physiologist with PHHI, evaluates food safety, quality and consumer-appeal characteristics, like flavor and color, for fruits and vegetables.

=== Programs ===
Plants for Human Health Institute researchers integrate expertise in biochemistry, plant breeding, epigenetics, metabolomics, pharmacogenomics, postharvest physiology, and systems biology. PHHI research faculty have:

- Led the team that sequenced the blueberry genome.
- Discovered evidence that plants of the family Brassicaceae (like mustard greens and kale) could increase muscle mass in people suffering from debilitating diseases and the effects of aging.
- Developed functional food ingredients from health-enhancing plant compounds for undernourished populations in Africa.
- Created fruit-infused peanut flours to combat peanut allergies.
- Established multiple plant breeding programs, including broccoli, cabbage, and strawberry.

=== Greenhouse Complex ===
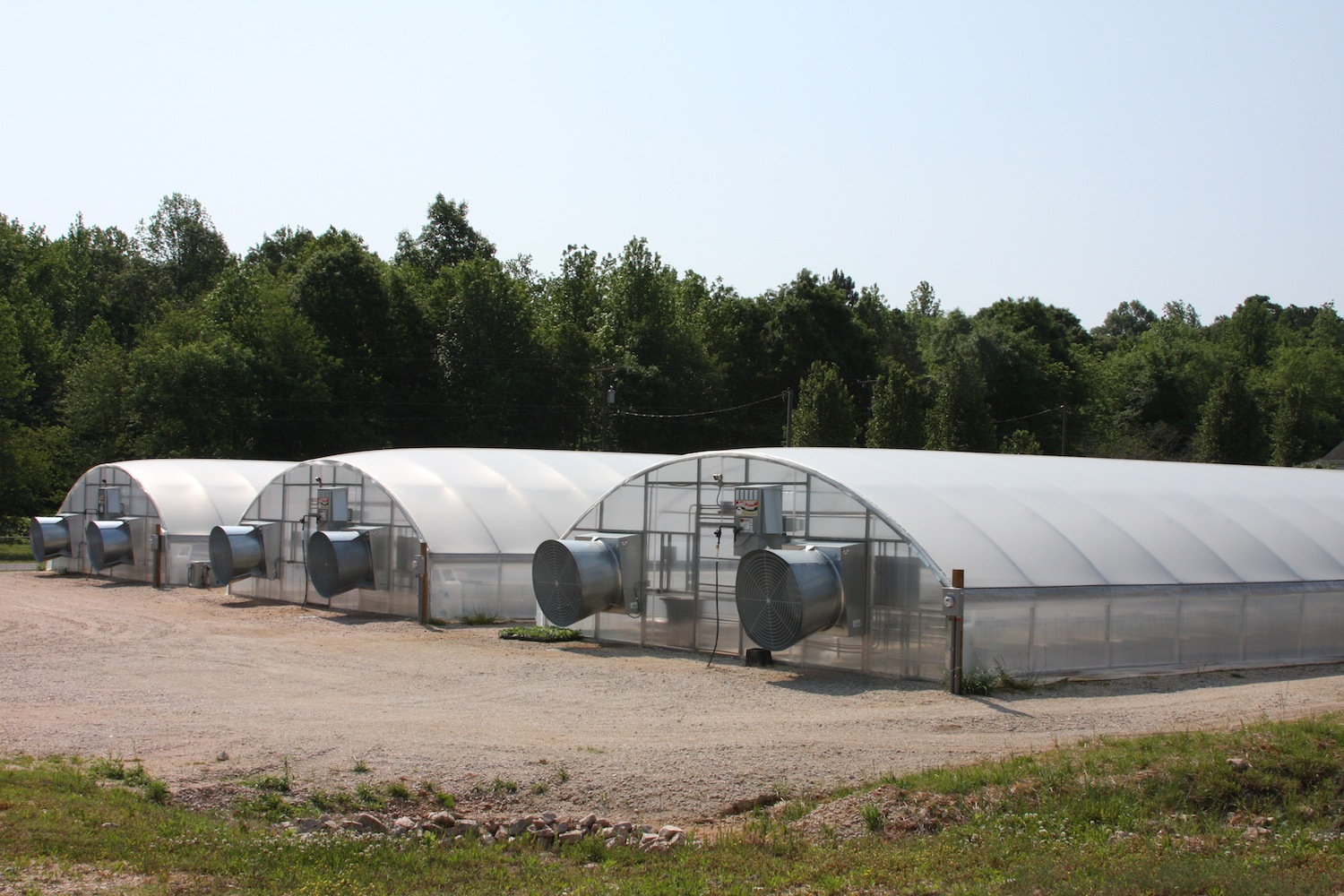
The Plants for Human Health Institute greenhouse complex in Kannapolis, N.C.

The institute operates three greenhouses. The greenhouse complex provides about 10,000 square feet of space for plant trials on crops like broccoli and strawberry and allows the institute to rent space or collaborate on research with other campus operations and businesses.

Researchers also partner with the Piedmont Research Station, a research farm located near Salisbury, N.C., to grow and test field crops.

=== Kannapolis Scholars ===
Funded by a $1 million grant from the U.S. Department of Agriculture – Agriculture & Food Research Initiative (USDA-AFRI) - the Kannapolis Scholars was a program for graduate students from multiple disciplines to participate in integrated research. Led by Jack Odle, William Neal Reynolds, Professor of Nutritional Biochemistry at N.C. State, the scholars examined issues in the broad domain of functional foods, bioactive food components and human health. 30 faculty members from eight universities in North Carolina, from multiple disciplines, including food science, nutritional science, plant science, animal science, microbiology, biochemistry and metabolomics act as mentors to the Kannapolis Scholars.

=== Plant Pathways Elucidation Project (P2EP) ===
The Plant Pathways Elucidation Project, or P2EP, was a $1.9 million program that engaged college students across North Carolina in education and research. Operated from June 2013 to December 2019, the program was supported by a consortium of academic and industry organizations, including the Plants for Human Health Institute. The program teamed university scientists, industry leaders, and college students to explore plant health benefits, prepare student scientists to pursue careers in STEM fields (Science, Technology, Engineering, and Math), and create a research knowledge base.

== Extension ==
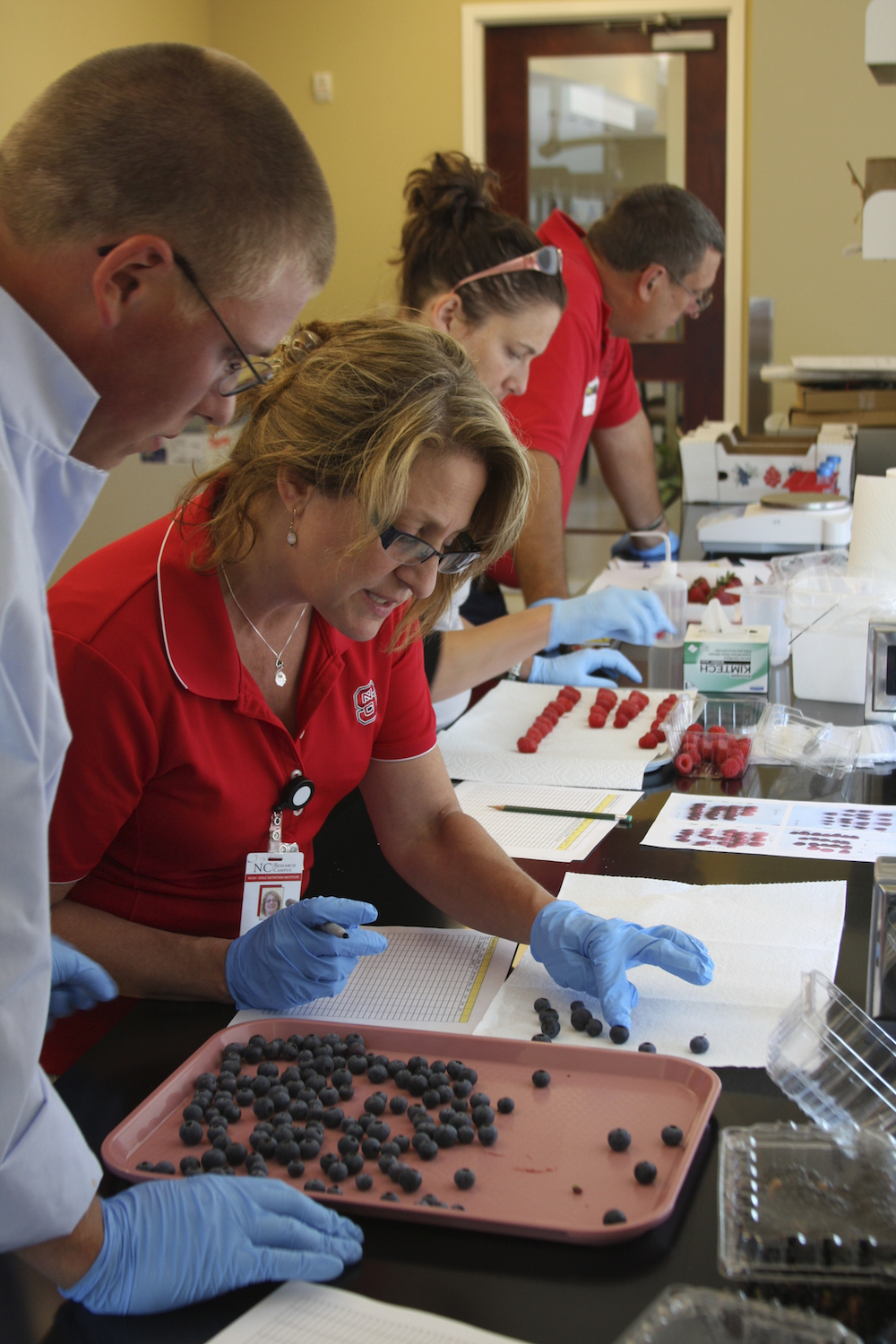
N.C. Cooperative Extension personnel, like Diane Ducharme (second from left), work with researchers in areas including postharvest handling of fresh produce at N.C. State University's Plants for Human Health Institute in Kannapolis, N.C.

The N.C. State Extension houses a multidisciplinary team at the N.C. Research Campus as part of the Plants for Human Health Institute. The team is an education and outreach component of PHHI directed towards STEM Education and Translational Nutrition.

=== History ===
Blake Brown, Hugh C. Kiger Professor in agricultural economics at N.C. State, started the Program for Value-Added and Alternative Agriculture in 2006 with support from the N.C. Tobacco Trust Fund Commission. The program was originally created to assist the transition of tobacco-farm families to other profitable enterprises after the Tobacco Buyout in 2005.

As part of N.C. State's development of the N.C. Research Campus, the program relocated to Kannapolis in 2008 as an on-site Cooperative Extension that complements the research personnel and programs with the institute. The program operated under the N.C. MarketReady brand from October 2009 until July 2012. The program has since dropped the name and been fully integrated into the institute as the N.C. State Extension component.

== N.C. Research Campus ==
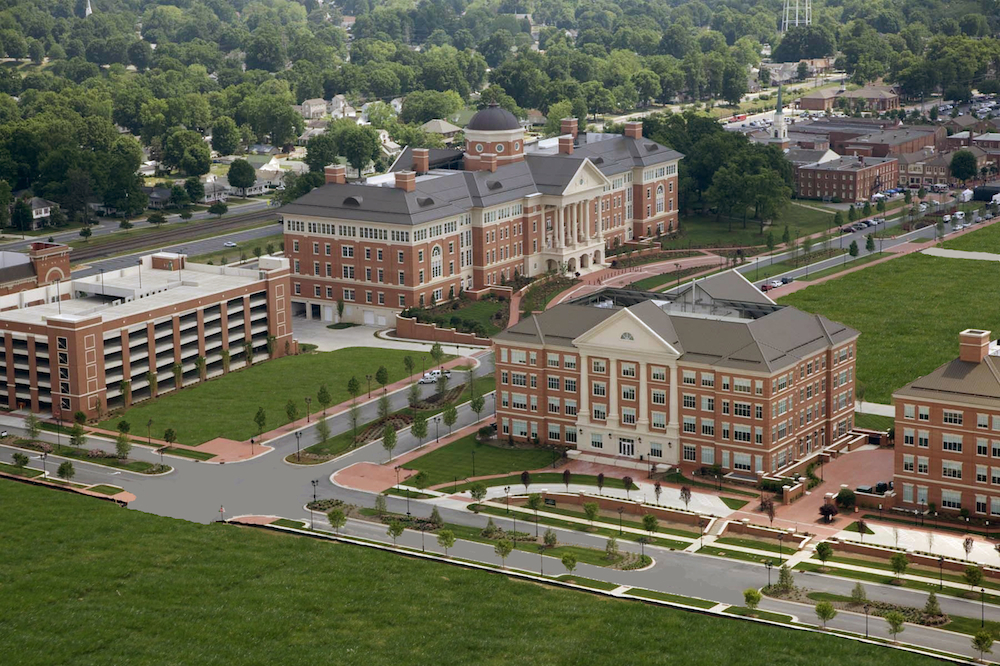
The N.C. Research Campus

The N.C. Research Campus is a public-private venture including eight universities, one community college, the David H. Murdock Research Institute (DHMRI), and corporate entities that collaborate to advance the fields of human health, nutrition, and agriculture. It was founded by David H. Murdock, CEO of Dole Foods. The campus is built upon the former site of the Cannon Textile Mill in Kannapolis, about 30 miles north of Charlotte.

The research campus represents an effort by the state of North Carolina to revitalize the region following the decline of the textile industry.

It was announced in November 2013 that two new facilities were breaking ground at the Kannapolis campus, including a 50,000-square-foot data center (Data chambers) and a 100,000-square-foot municipal center (the new Kannapolis City Hall).

The Plants for Human Health Institute is housed on the campus in a 105,000-square-foot facility that includes research labs, lab support areas, and an Advance II 700 US - 2 Magnet nuclear magnetic resonance spectroscope.

== Funding ==
The institute has received $2.1 million in gift donations and $7.8 million in federal and private competitive grants, $1.42 million from the N.C. Tobacco Trust Fund Commission, $2 million from the N.C. Department of Agriculture and Consumer Services and the U.S. Department of Agriculture, $780,000 from the University of North Carolina General Administration, and $1.05 million from commodity groups and other private sponsors. This funding is in addition to state appropriations. PHHI research programs have also received significant grant funding support from the Bill & Melinda Gates Foundation and the National Institutes of Health.
