= North Carolina State University College of Agriculture and Life Sciences =

North Carolina State University's College of Agriculture and Life Sciences (CALS) is the fourth largest college in the university and one of the largest colleges of its kind in the nation, with nearly 3,400 students pursuing associate, bachelor's, master's and doctoral degrees and 1,300 on-campus and 700 off-campus faculty and staff members.

With headquarters in Raleigh, North Carolina, the college includes 12 academic departments, the North Carolina Agricultural Research Service and the North Carolina Cooperative Extension Service. The college dean is Dr. Garey Fox.

The research service is the state's principal agency of agricultural and life sciences research, with close to 600 projects related to more than 70 agricultural commodities, related agribusinesses and life science industries. Scientists work not only on the college campus in Raleigh but also at 18 agricultural research stations and 10 field laboratories across the state.

The extension service is the largest outreach effort at North Carolina State University, with local centers serving all 100 of North Carolina's counties as well as the Eastern Band of the Cherokee Indians. Cooperative Extension's educational programs, carried out by state specialists and county agents, focus on agriculture, food and 4-H youth development. About 43,000 volunteers and advisory leaders also contribute to Extension's efforts.

The college staffs the Plants for Human Health Institute at the N.C. Research Campus in Kannapolis with faculty from the departments of horticultural science; food, bioprocessing and nutrition sciences; plant biology; genetics; and agricultural and resource economics.

Each year, the Department of Plant Pathology at the college contributes to the sponsorship of the Bailey Memorial Tour. This tour provides prospective agriculture students with a comprehensive introduction to the field of agricultural pathology, honoring the legacy of Dr. Jack Bailey, a pioneering Professor of Plant Pathology.

== Departments ==
The college has the following departments:

- Agricultural and Human Sciences
- Agricultural and Resource Economics
- Animal Science
- Applied Ecology
- Biological and Agricultural Engineering
- Crop and Soil Sciences
- Entomology and Plant Pathology
- Food, Bioprocessing and Nutrition Sciences
- Horticultural Science
- Molecular and Structural Biochemistry
- Plant and Microbial Biology
- Prestage Department of Poultry Science

== Majors ==
CALS offers more than 60 bachelor's, master's, Ph.D. and associate degree programs in a wide array of disciplines. Undergraduate majors are as follows:

- Agricultural Business Management
  - Biological Sciences Concentration
- Agricultural Education
  - Teacher Certification Option
- Agricultural and Environmental Technology
  - Agricultural Systems Management
  - Environmental Systems Management
- Agricultural Science
- Animal Science
- Biochemistry
- Biological Engineering
  - Agricultural Engineering Concentration
  - Environmental Engineering Concentration
  - Bioprocessing Engineering Concentration
- Bioprocessing Science
- Extension Education
  - Agricultural Extension Concentration
  - Youth Leadership Development Concentration
- Food Science
- Horticultural Science
  - Floriculture, Ornamental, Fruits and Vegetables Concentration
  - General Horticulture Concentration
  - Landscape Design Concentration
- Natural Resources
  - Soil and Water Systems Concentration
  - Soil Resources Concentration
- Nutrition Science
  - Applied Nutrition Concentration
- Plant Biology
- Plant and Soil Science
  - Agroecology Concentration
  - Agronomic Business Concentration
  - Agronomic Science Concentration
  - Crop Biotechnology Concentration
  - Crop Production Concentration
  - Soil Science Concentration
- Poultry Science
- Soil and Land Development
  - Land Development Concentration
  - Soil Science Concentration
- Turfgrass Science
