= Park Foundation =

American nonprofit organization

- Named after: Roy H. Park
- Formation: 1966
- Founder: Roy H. Park
- Type: Nonprofit
- Tax ID no.: 16-6071043
- Legal status: 501(c)(3) foundation
- Headquarters: Ithaca, New York
- Methods: Grant-making
- Board President: Adelaide P. Gomer
- Executive Director: Rachel Leon
- Board of directors: Adelaide P. Gomer; Alicia P. Wittink; Hon. Donna F. Edwards; Jay R. Halfon; Jerome B. Libin
- Affiliations: Triad Foundation
- Disbursements: $33.7 million (2023)
- Endowment: $384 million (2023)
- Website: www.parkfoundation.org

The Park Foundation is an American nonprofit foundation founded in 1966 by entrepreneur and media mogul Roy H. Park.

The foundation supports a variety of liberal and environmental causes, and has been a major supporter of the anti-fracking movement as well as education. From 2009 to 2012, the foundation gave over $3 million to dozens of advocacy groups and other institutions that oppose fracking, including $175,000 to produce the documentary Gasland. In 2013, the foundation gave $50 million to endow the Park Scholarships program at North Carolina State University.

It is based in Ithaca, New York, and is chaired by Park's daughter, Adelaide Park Gomer. Rachel Leon is the Executive Director.

In 2003, the Triad Foundation was spun off from the Park Foundation, as a result of political disputes between Park's children.
