= Peter Hans =

American higher education administrator

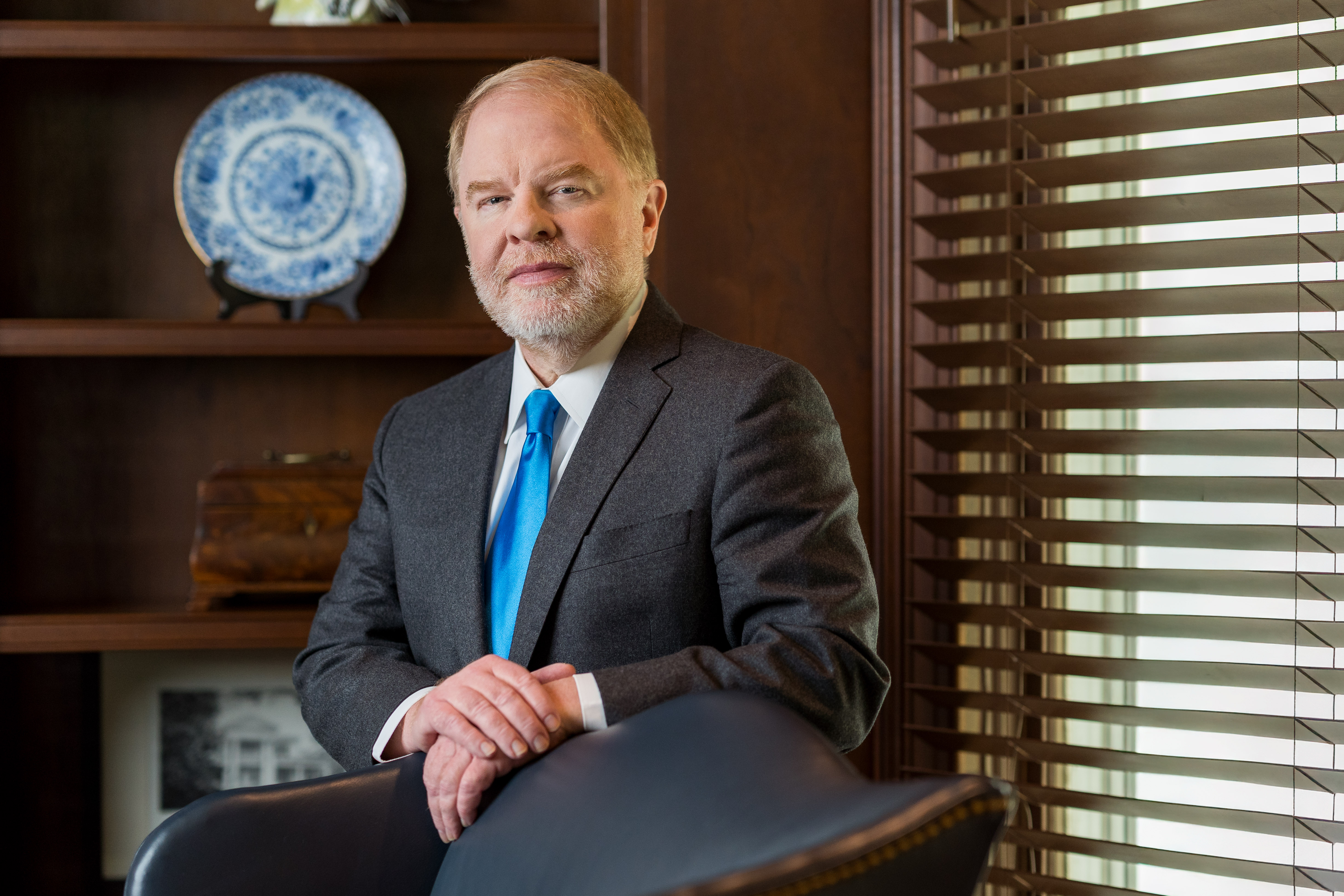
- Hans at his Chapel Hill home, 2026

7th President of the University of North Carolina System
- Incumbent
- Assumed office August 1, 2020
- Preceded by: William L. Roper (acting)

9th President of the North Carolina Community College System
- In office May 1, 2018 – July 31, 2020
- Preceded by: Jennifer Haygood (acting)
- Succeeded by: William Carver (acting)

Personal details
- Education: University of North Carolina, Chapel Hill (BA); Harvard University (MLA)

Peter Hans is an American higher education administrator who has served as the seventh president of the University of North Carolina System since August 2020. He previously served as the ninth president of the North Carolina Community College System and earlier served on the State Board of Community Colleges and the University of North Carolina Board of Governors.

== Early life and career ==
Hans grew up in the small towns of Southport on the coast and Hendersonville in the mountains of North Carolina. He earned a Bachelor of Arts degree in political science from the University of North Carolina at Chapel Hill and a Master of Liberal Arts in Extension Studies from Harvard Extension School. Hans is a first-generation college graduate.

During his early career in Washington, Hans was a policy advisor to Republican U.S. senators Lauch Faircloth, Richard Burr and Elizabeth Dole. Later, Hans and former Democratic North Carolina lieutenant governor Dennis Wicker built a government relations practice at a series of regional law firms in North Carolina.

Hans was elected to the North Carolina State Board of Community Colleges in 1997, when he was 27 years old. He served six years, becoming vice chair. In 2003, at age 33, the North Carolina Senate named him to the UNC System’s governing board for the first of three four-year terms, including two years as chairman.

From 2016 to 2018, he advised former UNC System president Margaret Spellings on issues related to technology, health care, strategic planning and K-12 education.

== North Carolina Community College System ==
Hans served as the ninth president of the North Carolina's Community College System from May 2018 through July 2020. As president, Hans oversaw a period of enrollment growth and improved graduation rates. Apprenticeship and teacher-training initiatives also expanded.

== University of North Carolina System ==
Hans leads the University of North Carolina System, one of the nation’s largest four-year university systems, with 17 campuses and more than 250,000 students. He became the seventh president of the system in August 2020.

Under Hans, the UNC System maintained a tuition freeze, published a 2023 systemwide report on student mental health, and announced related initiatives to support students.

The UNC System and the North Carolina Community College System also promoted the Next NC Scholarship for students from families earning less than $80,000. The system developed a process for awarding college credit for military experience and launched NC College Connect, a direct-admission program for qualifying North Carolina high school seniors.

During Hans's presidency, the UNC System also released a study of graduates' earnings and return on investment that found strong lifetime returns for UNC graduates. In 2026, it also released a study identifying workforce gaps in fields including nursing and engineering.

Academic offices
Preceded by Jennifer Haygood; Acting	President of the North Carolina Community College System; 2018–2020	Succeeded by Bill Carver; Acting
Preceded by William L. Roper; Acting	President of the University of North Carolina System; 2020–present	Incumbent
