= List of North Carolina State University people =

The list of North Carolina State University people includes alumni, faculty, and chief executives of North Carolina State University.

== Alumni, faculty, and former students ==
=== Academics ===
- Annie Antón (professor 1998–2012), professor of software engineering and founder of ThePrivacyPlace
- David E. Aspnes (professor 1992–present), Distinguished University Professor and member of the National Academy of Sciences
- William Brantley Aycock (B.S. Education 1936), former University of North Carolina at Chapel Hill chancellor
- John Balaban (professor ca. 2000–present), poet
- Donald Bitzer (professor 1989–2024), "father" of plasma television
- Frank A Buckless (professor 1989–present), KPMG professor and department head of Accounting at North Carolina State University’s Poole College of Management
- Karen Bullock (Bachelors of Social Work, 1990), sociologist, clinical social worker, and academic
- Albert Carnesale (PhD Nuclear Engineering 1966; faculty member 1962–1969), UCLA chancellor
- Teresa Abi-Nader Dahlberg (Ph.D. computer engineering), 11th president of the University of Tampa
- Carol Fowler Durham (Ed.D. Adult Education 2009), professor of nursing and medical simulation leader at University of North Carolina at Chapel Hill
- Donald J. Farish (M.S. Entomology, 1966), biologist and president of Rowan University
- William C. Friday (B.S. Textile Engineering 1941), former president of the University of North Carolina
- Eduardo Halfon, Guatemalan writer
- John Kessel (professor 1982–present), science-fiction author
- Steven Kuehl (M.S. 1982; Ph.D. 1983), professor of marine geology
- Dorianne Laux (professor ca. 2008–present), poet
- Trudy Mackay (professor 1987–present), quantitative geneticist, winner of the Wolf Prize in Agriculture in 2016
- Bruce D. McDonald III (M.Ed. 2021), professor of Public Budgeting and Finance at North Carolina State University
- Sarah Nusser (master's, botany, 1983), statistician and vice president of research at Iowa State University
- Gwen Pearson (graduate, biology, 1992)
- Lisa M. Porter (PhD materials science 1993), professor of Materials Science at Carnegie Mellon University
- Tom Regan (professor 1967–present), philosopher and animal rights activist
- John M. Riddle (professor ca. 1965–2005), historian and author of Eve's Herbs
- Robert Rodman (professor 1973–2017), professor of computer science, author of Introduction to Language
- Mary Schweitzer (professor 2003–present), paleontologist
- Charles Edward Stevens (professor 1980–1992), professor and expert in comparative physiology and digestive systems
- Blake Ragsdale Van Leer, former dean of Engineering at North Carolina State University and president of Georgia Tech
- Rodney Waschka II (professor 1990–present), composer
- Gregory Washington (PhD Mechanical Engineering 1994), president of George Mason University in Fairfax, Virginia; former dean of the Henry Samueli School of Engineering at University of California, Irvine
- Elizabeth Whittaker, architect, founder of Merge Architects and associate professor in Practice of Architecture at Harvard University's Graduate School of Design
- R. V. Young (professor), Renaissance English literature scholar, co-founder of the John Donne Journal
- Khodr Zaarour (professor, 2024–present), scholar in international relations and founder of the Muslim American Public Affairs Council

=== Athletics ===
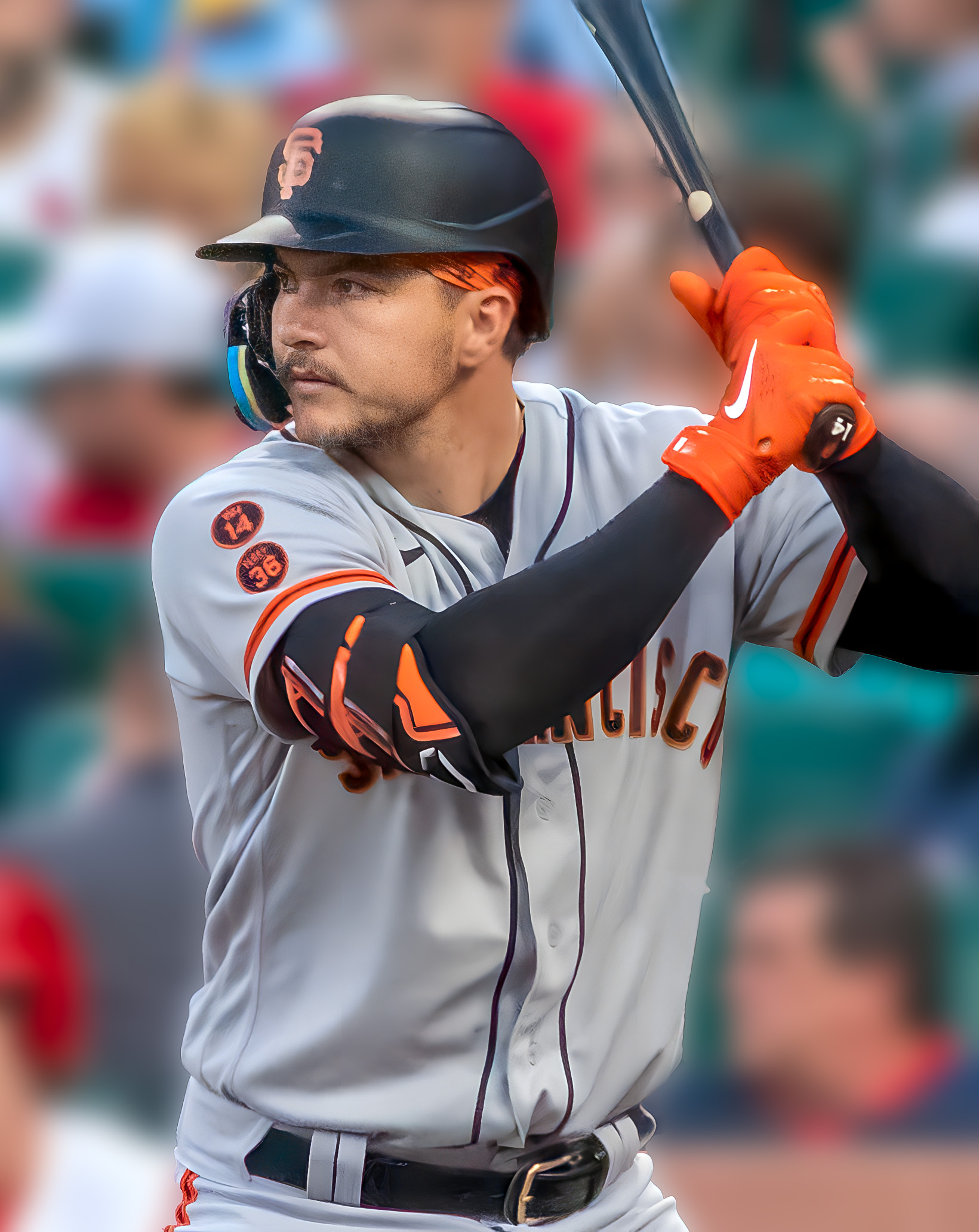
Patrick Bailey

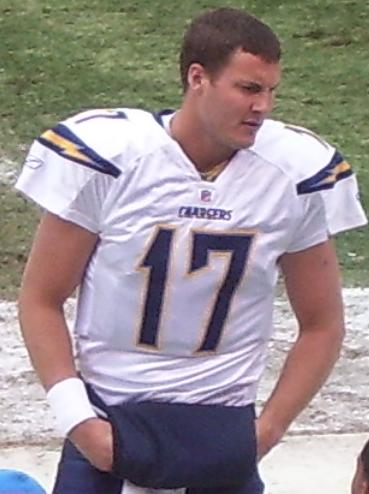
Philip Rivers, NFL quarterback and Pro Bowler

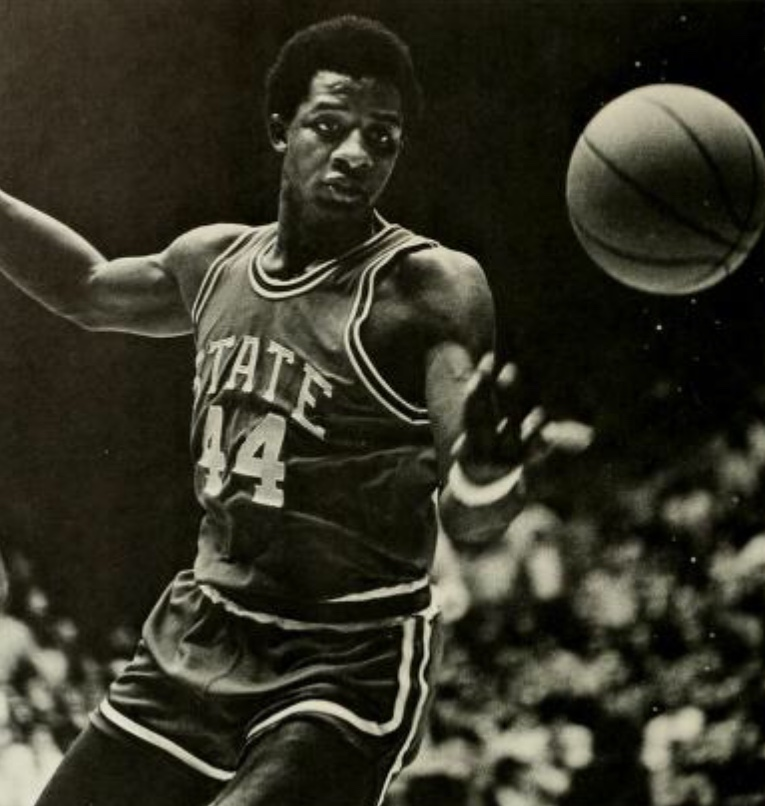
David Thompson

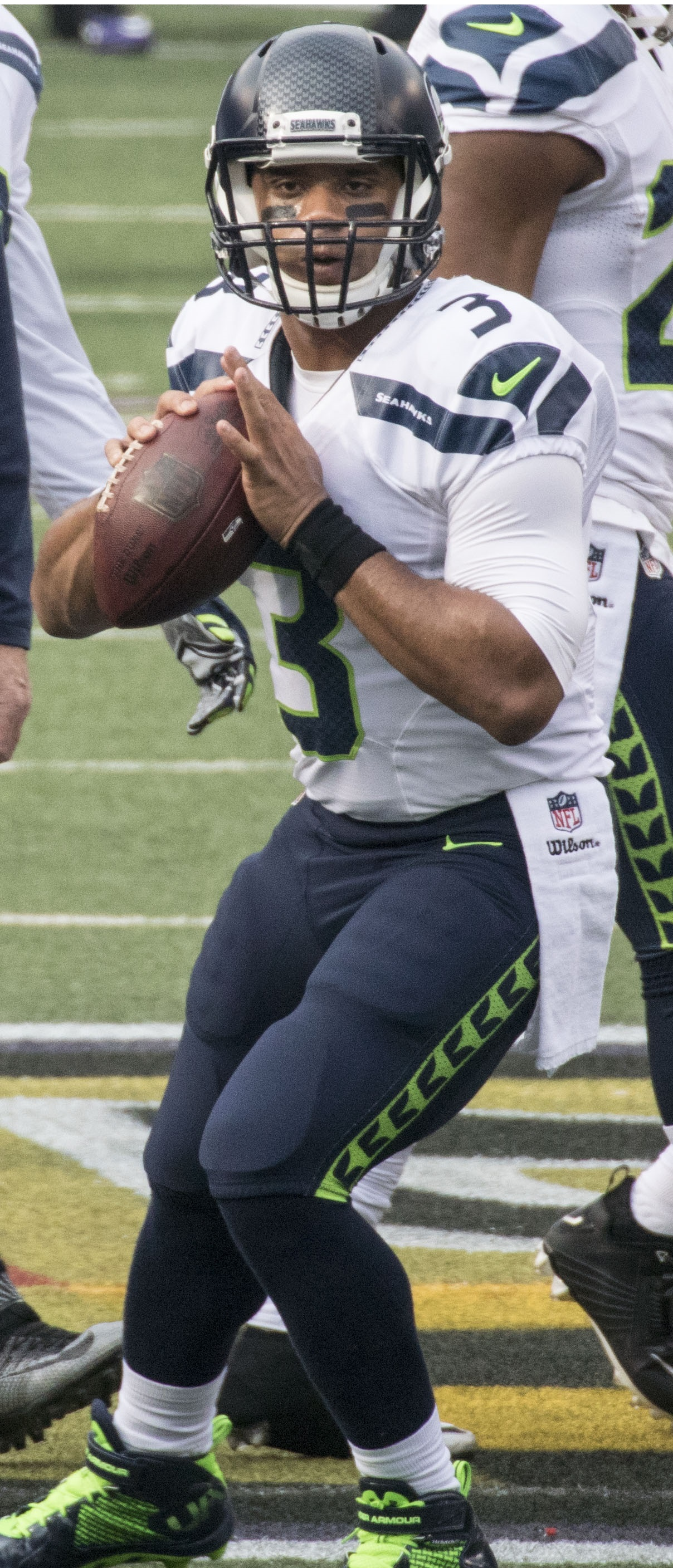
Russell Wilson

- Abdul-Malik Abu (born 1995), basketball player in the Israeli Premier Basketball League
- Nazmi Albadawi, midfielder for NASL club Carolina Railhawks
- Debbie Antonelli (Business Management and Economics 1986), basketball broadcaster and analyst
- BeeJay Anya (2017 graduate), 2015 ACC Sixth Man of the year, current free agent
- Patrick Bailey, catcher for the Cleveland Guardians
- Thurl Bailey (1983), former NBA player
- Cat Barber, NBA player, attended (2013–16)
- Joan Benoit, won the first Women's Olympic Marathon at the 1984 Olympic Games in Los Angeles; former world record holder in the marathon; member of US Olympic Hall of Fame
- Andrew Brackman (2005), pitcher for the Cincinnati Reds
- Jacoby Brissett, NFL quarterback for Arizona Cardinals
- Dario Brose (1992), former professional soccer player for France and Germany, San Jose Earthquakes; 1992 Olympic soccer team
- Lorenzo Brown (born 1990), basketball player in the Israeli Basketball Premier League, formerly in the NBA
- Ted Brown (born 1957), football player, Minnesota Vikings
- D.J. Burns (2024), basketball player in the Israeli Basketball Premier League
- Darrion Caldwell (2011), 2009 national wrestling champion at 149lbs; professional mixed martial artist, competing for Bellator MMA
- Alan-Michael Cash, defensive tackle for the Montreal Alouettes
- Tim Clark, PGA Tour golfer; winner of the Players Championship in 2010
- Beth Cochran, U Sports All-Canadian basketball player; inductee of the Manitoba Sports Hall of Fame and Museum
- Chris Colmer (2005), offensive lineman for the Tampa Bay Buccaneers
- Chris Corchiani (1991), former NBA player
- Jerricho Cotchery (2004), football player, Carolina Panthers
- Bill Cowher (B.S. Education 1979), football, former head coach of the Pittsburgh Steelers
- Vinny Del Negro (1988), former NBA head coach of the Los Angeles Clippers
- Jonathan Diaz, MLB player for the Toronto Blue Jays
- Johnny Evans, NFL and CFL quarterback and punter; current radio sportscaster for NC State football
- Charlotte Flair (B.S. Public Relations 2008), real name Ashley Fliehr, WWE wrestler
- David Fox (B.S. Civil Engineering 1994), 1996 Olympic swimmer
- Lennard Freeman (born 1995), basketball player in the Israeli Basketball Premier League
- Roman Gabriel (B.S. Education 1962), football player
- Mike Glennon, NFL quarterback
- Bubba Green, former NFL lineman
- Tom Gugliotta (1992), former NBA player
- Frank Harris, former National Football League player, Chicago Bears
- Lloyd Harrison (B.S. Business 2000), retired National Football League player
- J.J. Hickson (attended 2007–2008), NBA player
- Julius Hodge (B.A. Communications 2005), NBA player, Denver Nuggets, No. 20 pick in the 2005 NBA draft
- Cole Holcomb (2019), NFL linebacker
- Terrence Holt (B.A. Sociology 2004, attended 1999–2001), football player
- Torry Holt (B.A. Sociology 1998), retired National Football League player
- Richard Howell (born 1990), American-Israeli basketball player for Hapoel Tel Aviv of the Israeli Basketball Premier League
- John Huzvar, football player
- Markell Johnson (2020 graduate), basketball player in the Israeli Basketball Premier League
- Cullen Jones, 2008 Olympic gold medalist, 4x100 freestyle relay; 2012 Olympic gold medalist, 4x100 medley relay
- Trevor Lacey (attended 2014–2015), professional basketball player for Dinamo Sassari
- Manny Lawson (B.S. Industrial Engineering 2006), football player, Buffalo Bills
- Justine Lindsay, first transgender National Football League cheerleader, Carolina TopCats
- Sean Locklear (2004), NFL offensive lineman for the Seattle Seahawks
- Sidney Lowe (1983), former NBA player; former head coach of the North Carolina State University basketball team
- Caleb Martin (attended 2014–2016), NBA player
- Cody Martin (attended 2014–2016), NBA player
- Pablo Mastroeni (attended 1994–1997), soccer player, Miami Fusion and Colorado Rapids; represented the US in the FIFA World Cup in 2002 and 2006
- Cory Mazzoni, MLB player for the San Diego Padres
- Nate McMillan (attended 1985–1986), former NBA player; former head coach of the Portland Trail Blazers
- Cozell McQueen, starting center on 1983 NCAA Championship Team
- Joe Milinichik, former National Football League player, Detroit Lions, Los Angeles Rams and San Diego Chargers
- Colt Morton, former baseball catcher for the San Diego Padres and player for the Sugar Land Skeeters
- Chuck Nevitt (1982), former NBA player
- Les Palmer, football player
- Carl Pettersson, PGA Tour golfer
- Dan Plesac, former MLB player, 3x All-star
- Mike Quick (1982), former star NFL wide receiver for the Philadelphia Eagles (1982–90), and current Eagles' radio broadcaster
- Tab Ramos (attended 1984–1987, B.A. Foreign Language and Literature 2003), soccer player, MetroStars; represented the US in the FIFA World Cup in 1990, 1994, and 1998
- Lamont Reid (B.S. PRT 2005), NFL player, Denver Broncos
- Mike Reid, NFL defensive back Philadelphia Eagles
- Philip Rivers (B.S. Business 2003), football player, San Diego Chargers, No. 4 pick in the 2004 NFL draft
- Dave Robertson, former MLB player, 1922 World Series Champion
- Koren Robinson, football player, Green Bay Packers, No. 9 pick in the 2001 NFL draft
- Carlos Rodón, pitcher for Chicago White Sox
- Joe Scarpati, football player, Green Bay Packers, holder for Tom Dempsey's record breaking 63-yard field goal
- Scott Schweitzer, professional soccer player
- Cedric Simmons (attended 2004–2006), NBA player, Chicago Bulls; No. 15 pick in the 2006 NBA draft
- Dennis Smith Jr. (attended 2016–17), 2016–2017 ACC Rookie of the Year, No. 9 overall pick in the 2017 NBA draft, NBA player for the Detroit Pistons
- Vic Sorrell (head baseball coach 1946–1966), played 10 seasons in Major League Baseball
- Doug Strange, retired Major League Baseball player
- Craig Sutherland, professional soccer player
- Sylvester Terkay, professional wrestler
- Joe Thuney, NFL player for the Chicago Bears
- Pat Thomas, football player, Omaha Nighthawks
- Pete Thomas, football player
- David Thompson (B.A. Sociology 2003, attended 1971–1975), retired NBA and ABA player
- Jim Toman (B.A. Vocational Industrial Education 1985, M.A. Sports Management 1995), college baseball coach at Liberty
- Trea Turner, MLB player for Philadelphia Phillies
- Jim Valvano, head coach of men's basketball for NC State's National Championship (1983)
- Fernandus Vinson, NFL player
- T. J. Warren (attended 2012–2014), NBA player, Indiana Pacers; won 2014 ACC Player of the Year
- Spud Webb (attended 1983–1984), NBA player, Atlanta Hawks; won 1986 NBA Slam Dunk Contest
- C. J. Williams (born 1990), basketball player in the Israeli Basketball Premier League
- Mario Williams (attended 2003–2005), football player, Houston Texans, Buffalo Bills; No. 1 pick in the 2006 NFL draft
- Adrian Wilson (attended 1998–2001), football player, Arizona Cardinals
- Russell Wilson (2010 graduate), NFL football player, Seattle Seahawks, Super Bowl Champion
- Tracy Woodson, retired Major League Baseball player

=== Business ===
Name	Class	Degree	Notability	Ref
Henry E. Bonitz	1893		architect; one of the first to attend and graduate from NCSU	
Jim Goodnight		BS, MS, and PhD in Statistics	co-founder and CEO of SAS	
Joanna Saleeby Knott	2010		founder and owner of Monkee's of Raleigh	
Hal Lawton	1996		president and CEO of Tractor Supply	
Mohamed Mansour	1968	Textiles	Egyptian businessman and politician; chairman of Mansour Group	
James W. Owens		1968, MT 1970, PhD 1973	former CEO and chairman of Caterpillar Inc.	
Dr. John Townsend	1977	BA	author and consultant of leadership and organizational coaching	
John Widman	1984		luthier	
Jeff Williams	1985	BS in mechanical engineering	COO of Apple Inc.	
Edgar S. Woolard Jr.	1956	BS in Industrial Engineering	CEO of DuPont	

=== Media and entertainment ===
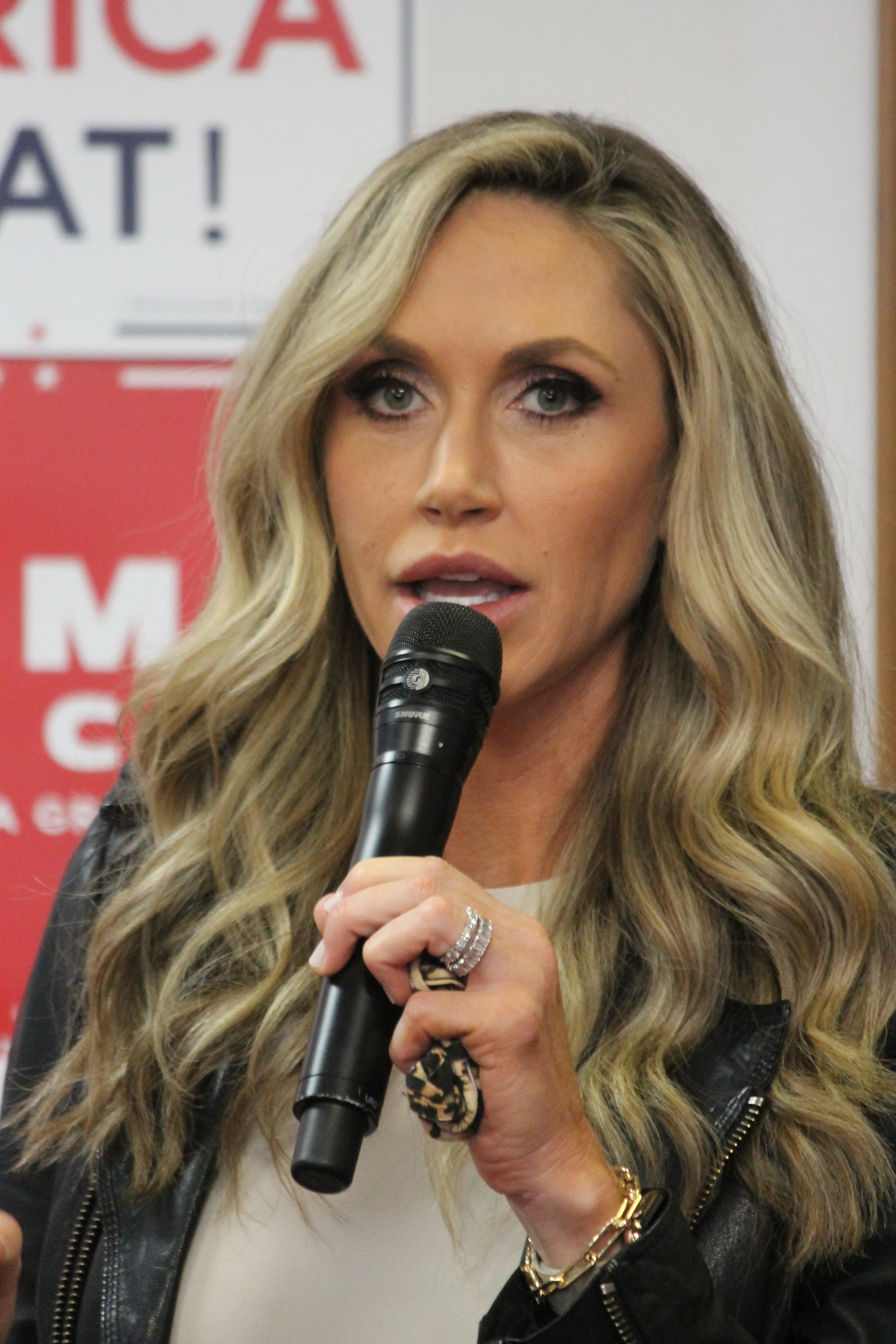
Lara Trump

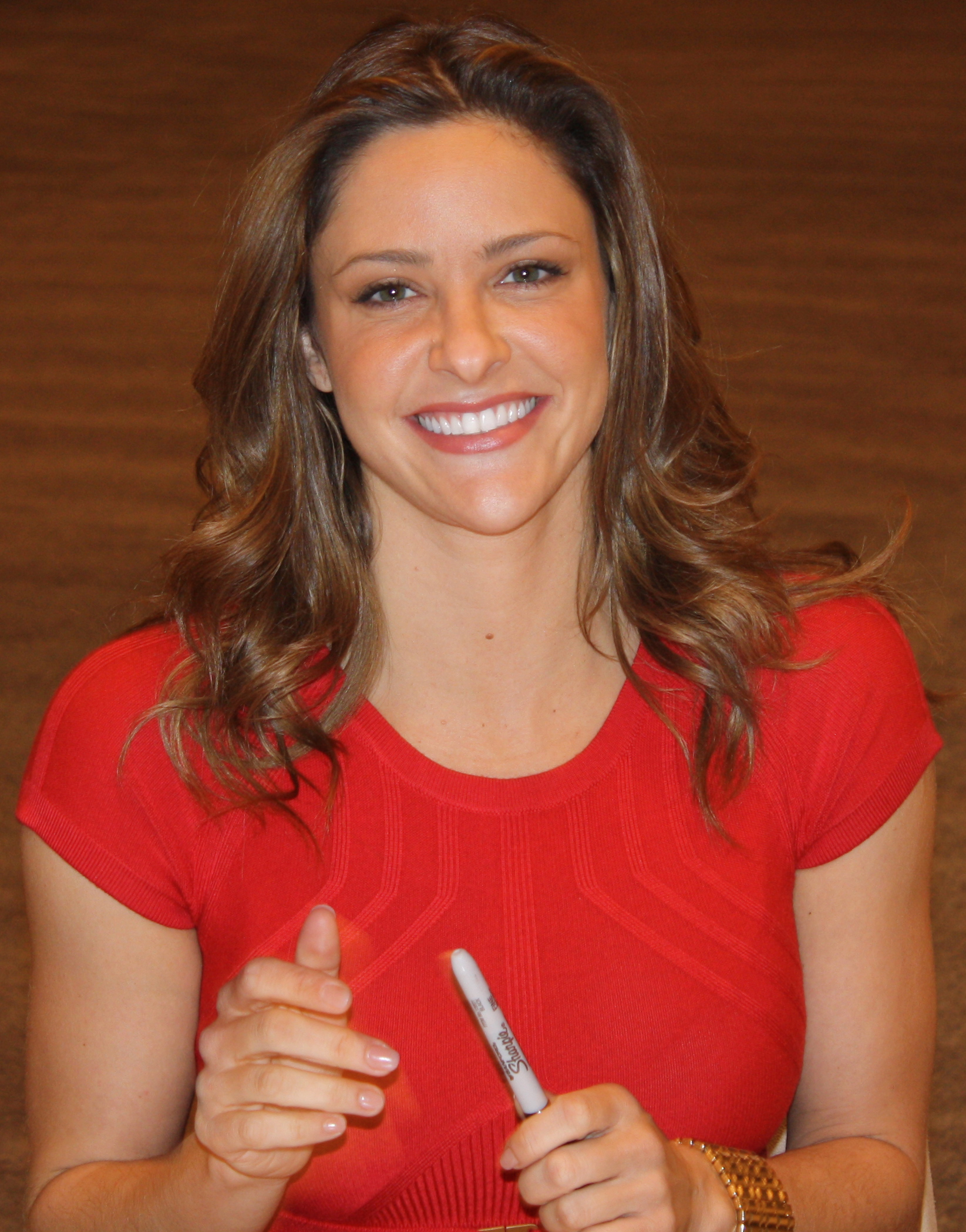
Jill Wagner

- Randy Boone (attended early 1960s), actor and singer
- Bill Burr (attended in the late 1980s; did not graduate), comedian, actor, writer, and podcaster
- Amanda Busick (B.S. Entrepreneurship major 2008), sideline/pit reporter and host for FOX Sports and Motor Trend
- Brett Claywell (B.S. Architecture 2001), actor
- John H. Davis (Mechanical & Aerospace Engineering 1970), host and creator of the PBS television program MotorWeek since the program's inception in 1981
- Dawn (Computer Science 2020), contestant on RuPaul's Drag Race season 16
- Zach Galifianakis (Communication and Film major circa 1987; did not graduate), comedian, actor, writer
- Terry Gannon (B.A. History 1985), ABC sports commentator and member of the 1983 NCAA Championship Team
- Connie B. Gay (B.S. Agricultural Education 1935), music executive and founding president of the Country Music Association
- Michael Gracz (B.S. Business 2004), professional poker player
- Brian Heidik, winner of Survivor: Thailand
- Chris Hondros, war photographer; killed in Libya in 2011
- Tim Kirkman (B.E.D. Design 1990), film writer, director
- Ken Matthews (B.A. in Political Science 1984), radio show host, professional speaker
- Scotty McCreery, American Idol champion; country singer
- Rhett McLaughlin (Civil Engineering 2000), Internet personality
- A.D. Miles (B.A. Communications 1992), head writer, The Tonight Show Starring Jimmy Fallon
- Link Neal (Industrial Engineering 2001), Internet personality
- Roy H. Park (B.A. 1931), communications executive
- T. R. Pearson (B.A. and M.A. in English), novelist
- Jerry Punch (B.S. Pre-Med 1975), sideline reporter and auto racing analyst for ESPN and ABC
- Rapsody, rapper and songwriter
- Jon Reep (B.A. Communications, 1996), comedian and winner of NBC's Last Comic Standing, season 5 (2007)
- Leah Roberts, Spanish and anthropology major; withdrew at end of 1999 and disappeared on a trip to Washington state in March 2000
- John Tesh (B.A. Communication 1975), musician, television presenter
- Tab Thacker (B.A. Criminal Justice), Police Academy actor; NCAA champion wrestler
- Lara Trump (B.A. Communications 2005), television host and producer; daughter-in-law of the 45th U.S. president, Donald Trump
- Jill Wagner (B.A. Management 2001), actress

=== Military ===
- Vice Admiral Joseph Aucoin (B.S. 1980), commander U.S. Seventh Fleet
- Rear Admiral Winford W. Barrow, commander of the Eighth District of the U.S. Coast Guard
- Admiral Daryl L. Caudle (B.S. 1985), commander United States Fleet Forces Command
- General Anthony J. Cotton (B.A. 1986), USAF, commander Air Force Global Strike Command
- Lieutenant General Buster Glosson (B.S. Electrical Engineering 1965), U.S. Air Force, deputy chief of staff for plans and operations of U.S. Air Force, Washington DC; during the Gulf War, commanded the 14th Air Division (provisional); director of campaign plans for U.S. Central Command Air Forces, Riyadh, Saudi Arabia
- Lieutenant General William E. Ingram Jr. (B.S. 1970), United States Army director of the Army National Guard
- Major General William C. Lee (B.S. 1917), first commander of the 101st Airborne Division
- General Dan K. McNeill (B.S. 1968), commander of NATO International Security Assistance Force
- General Raymond Odierno (M.S. Nuclear Effects Engineering), Chief of Staff of the United States Army; commanding general, Multi-national Force, Iraq; commanding general Fort Hood and U.S. Army III Corps
- General Hugh Shelton (B.S. Textile Technology 1963), former chairman of the U.S. Armed Forces Joint Chiefs of Staff
- General Maxwell R. Thurman (B.S. Chemical Engineering 1953), US Army general; vice chief of staff of the U.S. Army; first four-star officer at NCSU
- Blake Wayne Van Leer, commander and captain in the U.S. Navy; lead SeaBee program and lead the nuclear research and power unit at McMurdo Station during Operation Deep Freeze
- John Ray Webster, captain in the U.S. Army
- Eli L. Whiteley (M.S. 1948), Medal of Honor recipient

=== Politics ===
Name	Class	Degree	Notability	Ref
Nida Allam		BS	Durham County commissioner and third vice chair of the North Carolina Democratic Party	
Vernetta Alston		BA	member of the North Carolina House of Representatives	
June Atkinson	1996	EdD	former North Carolina Superintendent of Public Instruction	
Andrew James Bates	2009	BS in Political Science	former White House senior deputy press secretary for Joe Biden	
Chris Collins	1972	B.S.M.E.	United States representative from New York's 27th district	
Sarah Crawford		BA	member of the North Carolina House of Representatives	
John Edwards	1974	BS in textile technology	former United States senator from North Carolina, 2004 Democratic vice-presidential nominee, and 2008 Democratic presidential candidate	
Abdurrahim El-Keib	1984	PhD Electrical Engineering	engineering professor and interim prime minister of Libya	
Oliver Max Gardner	1903	BS	lawyer, businessman, and governor of North Carolina 1929–1933	
Robert Gibbs		BA in Political Science	former White House press secretary for Barack Obama	
J.D. Hayworth	1980	BA in Speech Communications and Political Science	United States Congress, 6th District, Arizona	
James B. Hunt Jr.	1959 196?	BS in Agricultural Education MS in Agricultural Economics	four-term governor of North Carolina	
Walter B. Jones	attended 1962–1965		member, United States Congress, 3rd District, North Carolina	
Robert B. Jordan, III	1954	BS in Forestry	lieutenant governor of North Carolina (1985–1989)	
Eddie Knox	1960	BS in Agriculture Education	former state senator and mayor of Charlotte, North Carolina 1979–1983	
Yasonna Laoly			minister of haw and Human rights of Indonesia (2014–2024)	
Ya Liu		PhD in Sociology	member of the North Carolina House of Representatives	
Geoff Luxenberg		BA	member of the Connecticut House of Representatives	
Saige Martin	2020	MA in Art and Design	one of two first openly gay members, and the first Latinx member, of the Raleigh City Council	
Patrick McHenry	attended 1997		member, United States Congress, 10th District, North Carolina and former speaker pro tempore of the United States House of Representatives	
Jeffrey McNeely	1986		member of the North Carolina House of Representatives	
Burley Mitchell	1966	BA	former North Carolina Supreme Court chief justice	
Wendell H. Murphy	1960	BS in Agriculture	former North Carolina Senate member	
Rajendra K. Pachauri	1972 1975	MS in Industrial Engineering PhD in Industrial Engineering and Economics	chaired the Intergovernmental Panel on Climate Change that shared the 2007 Nobel Peace Prize with Al Gore	
Hesham Qandil		PhD Biological and Agriculture Engineering	former prime minister of Egypt	
Michael Robinson			activist for civil right and human rights	
Glenn Rogers			member of the Texas House of Representatives (2021–Present)	
Stephen M. Ross		Masters of Public Administration (MPA)	member of the North Carolina House of Representatives	
Jason Saine	attended 1991–1993		member of the North Carolina House of Representatives	
William Kerr Scott	1917		North Carolina commissioner of agriculture, governor of North Carolina, and United States senator	
Cheryl Stallings	1987 1999	BA in Psychology PhD in Psychology	member of the Wake County Board of Commissioners	
Steve Troxler	1974	BS in Conservation	North Carolina Commissioner of Agriculture and consumer services	
Tommy Vitolo		BS	energy consultant and member of Massachusetts House of Representatives	

=== Science and technology ===
- Marshall Brain (M.S. Computer Science 1989, Instructor 1986–1992), founder of HowStuffWorks
- David Carroll (B.S. Physics 1985), director of the Center for Nanotechnology and Molecular Materials at Wake Forest University
- Lianne Gonsalves (B.S. Biological Sciences, 2010), research scientist and technical officer at the World Health Organization, Geneva
- James Goodnight (B.S. Applied Mathematics 1965, M.S. Experimental Statistics 1968, PhD Statistics 1972, faculty member 1972–1976), CEO of SAS Institute
- Jody L. Gookin, distinguished professor in the Department of Clinical Sciences and she is a Chancellor’s University Faculty Scholar at North Carolina State University
- Terry Hershner (studied Mechanical and Electrical Engineering 1997–2000), electric vehicle advocate and record holder; owner of Off The Grid
- Wes Jackson (PhD Genetics 1967), founder of the Land Institute
- Angie Jones (M.S. Computer Science 2010), holds 26 patented inventions in the United States of America and Japan
- Paul Jones (B.S. Computer Science), poet and director of ibiblio digital library
- Munir Ahmad Khan (M.S. Electrical Engineering, 1953), reactor engineer and chairman Pakistan Atomic Energy Commission 1972–1991
- Christina Koch (B.S. Electrical Engineering 2001, B.S. Physics 2002, M.S. Electrical Engineering 2002), astronaut, Artemis II Moon traveler
- John S. Mayo (B.S., M.S., PhD Electrical Engineering), engineer and seventh president of Bell Labs
- Freda Porter, applied mathematician and environmental scientist known as one of the first Native American women to earn a PhD in the mathematical sciences
- Anand Lal Shimpi (B.S. Electrical Engineering 2004), founder of AnandTech
- Katharine Stinson (B.S. Mechanical Engineering 1941), first female engineering graduate, first female engineer hired by Federal Aviation Administration
- Mark Templeton (Bachelor of Environmental Design 1975), president and CEO of Citrix Systems

== Chief executives of the university ==
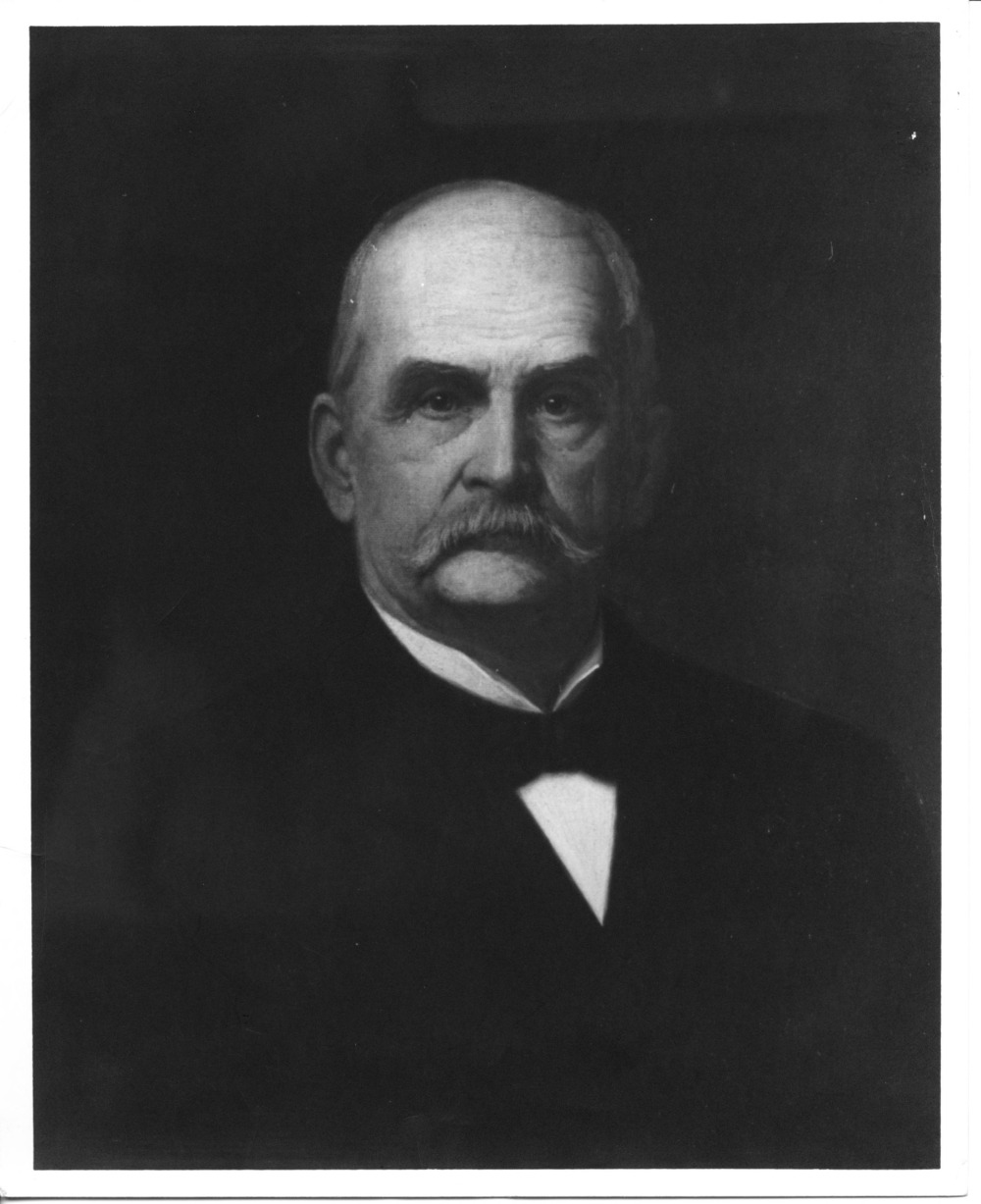
Alexander Q. Holladay, first president of NC State (1889–1899)

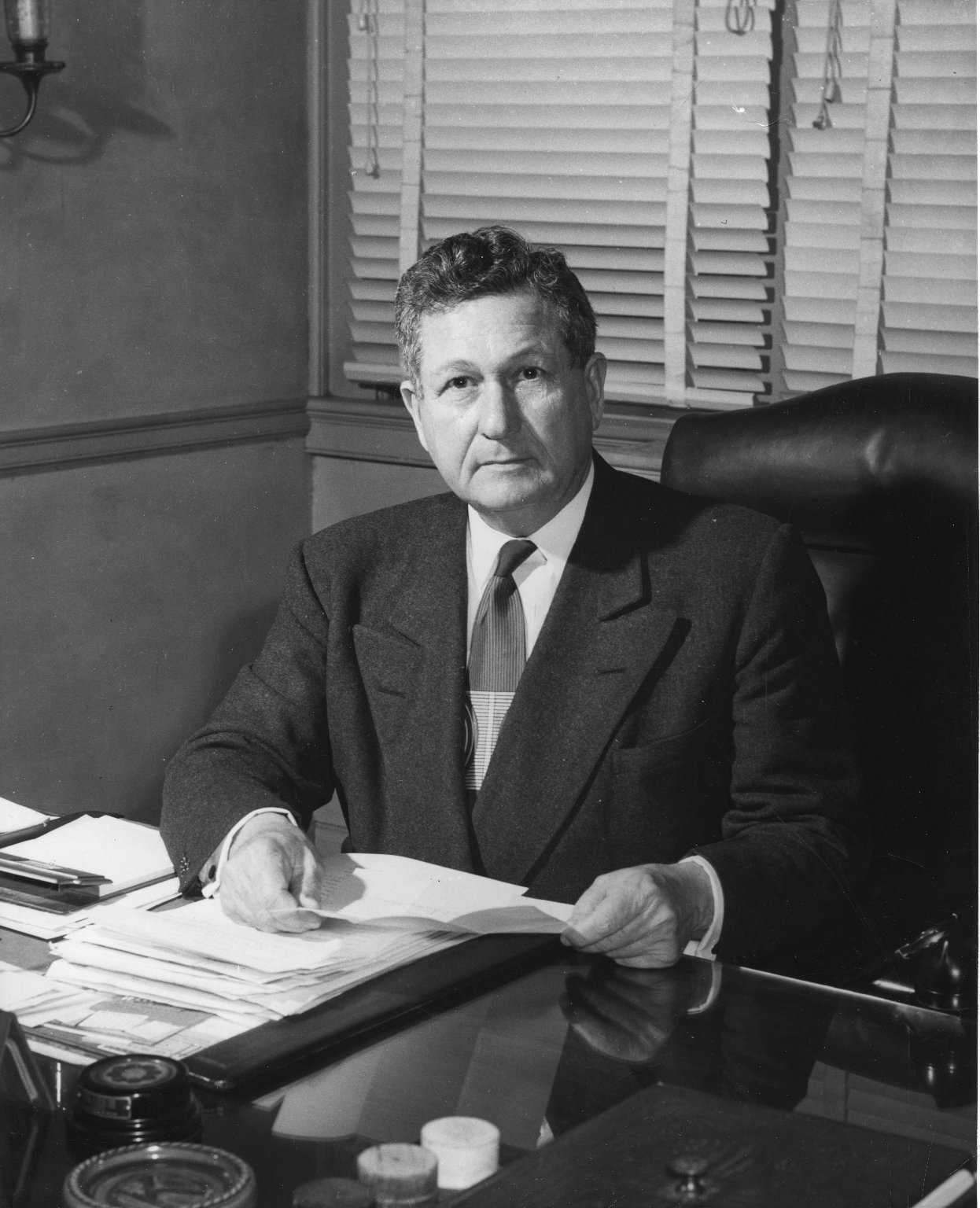
John W. Harrelson, first chancellor of NC State (1934–1953)

=== Presidents ===
- Alexander Q. Holladay, 1889–1899
- George T. Winston, 1899–1908
- Daniel H. Hill, Jr., 1908–1916
- Wallace Carl Riddick, 1916–1923
- Eugene C. Brooks, 1923–1934

=== Dean of Administration ===
- John W. Harrelson, 1934–1945

=== Chancellors ===
- John W. Harrelson, 1945–1953
- Carey Hoyt Bostian, 1953–1959
- John T. Caldwell, 1959–1975
- Jackson A. Rigney (interim), 1975
- Joab Thomas, 1975–1981
- Nash Winstead (interim), 1981–1982
- Bruce Poulton, 1982–1989
- Larry K. Monteith, 1989–1998
- Marye Anne Fox, 1998–2004
- Robert A. Barnhardt (interim), 2004
- James L. Oblinger, 2005–2009
- James H. Woodward (interim), 2009–2010
- Randy Woodson, 2010–2025
- Kevin Howell, 2025–present
