= History of North Carolina State University =

North Carolina State University was founded by the North Carolina General Assembly in 1887 as a land-grant college under the name North Carolina College of Agriculture and Mechanic Arts. As a land-grant college, NC State would provide a "liberal and practical education" while focusing on military tactics, agriculture and the mechanical arts without excluding classical studies. Since its founding, the university has maintained these objectives while building on them.

After opening its doors in 1889, NC State saw its enrollment fluctuate and its mandate expand. Due to the Great Depression, the North Carolina government administratively combined the University of North Carolina at Chapel Hill, the Woman's College at Greensboro, and NC State. This conglomeration later became the University of North Carolina system in 1971. After World War II, the university has constantly grown and changed.

== Founding: 1862–1889 ==
Although established in 1887, the North Carolina State University story begins in 1862 when President Abraham Lincoln signed the federal Morrill Land-Grant Act. This act created endowments that were to be used in the establishment of colleges that would provide a "liberal and practical education" while focusing on military tactics, agriculture and the mechanical arts without excluding classical studies.

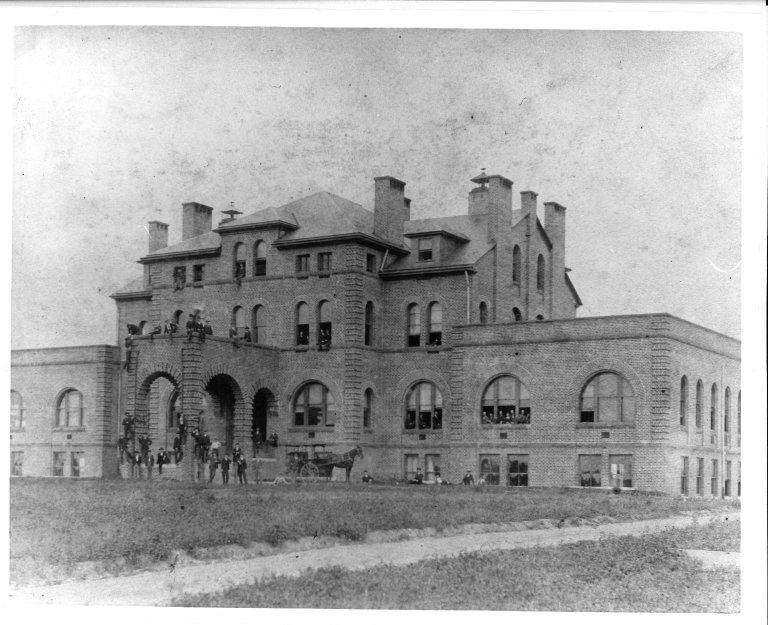
North Carolina State College of Agriculture and Mechanic Arts with president Alexander Q. Holladay, faculty, and first freshman class posing in front of the college's main building (later named Holladay Hall). Date: 1890

During Reconstruction, North Carolina allocated its endowment to the University of North Carolina at Chapel Hill. For two decades, that university received $7,500 annually from the endowment. Led by Colonel Leonidas Lafayette Polk In the mid-1880s, both state farmers and business leaders claimed that Chapel Hill's "elitist" education did not meet the mandate set forth by the Morrill Land-Grant Act. On March 7, 1887, the North Carolina General Assembly authorized the establishment of the North Carolina College of Agriculture and Mechanic Arts. The state also budgeted money for the new college and transferred North Carolina's land-grant endowment to it as well. R. Stanhope Pullen gave land towards the establishment of the new college in Raleigh. The cornerstone of the main building (now called Holladay Hall)was laid in 1888 by the Grand Lodge of North Carolina. The college formally opened on October 3, 1889.

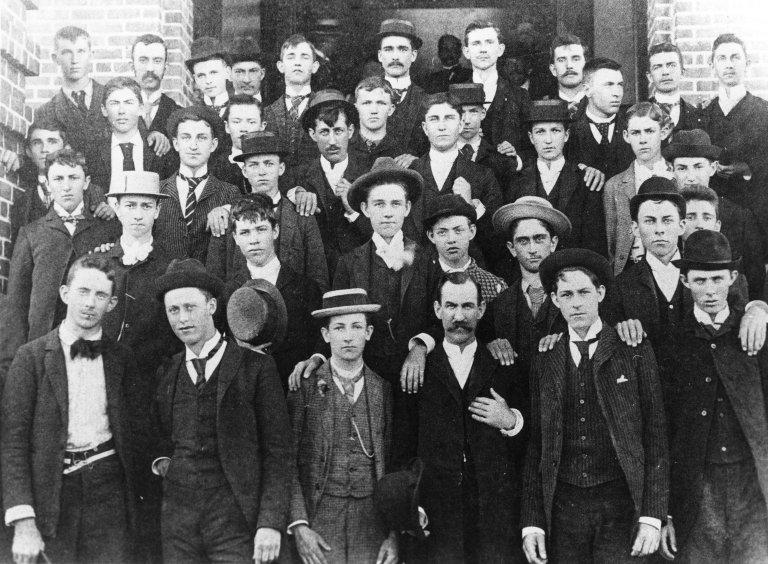
First freshman class at North Carolina College of Agriculture and Mechanic Arts in 1889.

71 students enrolled the first year.

== Early years: 1889–1945 ==
Between 1889 and the end of World War I, the college experienced growth and expansion of purpose. Along with United States Department of Agriculture, State College created the Boys' and Girls' Clubs in 1909 (which later became 4-H in 1926). In 1914 the federal Smith-Lever Act enabled the university to establish state, county, and local extension programs. These two new programs allowed the university's knowledge resources to directly benefit the people of North Carolina, not just those students who walked its halls. By 1918 the college had an enrollment over 700 students and it had a new name—North Carolina State College of Agriculture and Engineering.

By the end of World War I, State College experienced many institutional changes and fluctuating enrollment. In the 1920s, many of the college's educational units were organized into schools (e.g. School of Agriculture, Textile School...). In 1920 enrollment reached 1,000 and by 1929 enrollment doubled to 2,000. In 1927, the first women graduated from the college.

The Great Depression brought many challenges to State College when economic hardships caused enrollment to suffer. To address issues institutional inefficiencies, the State of North Carolina established the Consolidated University of North Carolina in 1931. This administratively combined the University of North Carolina at Chapel Hill, the Woman's College in Greensboro, and State College. This move also brought another name – North Carolina State College of Agriculture and Engineering of the University of North Carolina. The Consolidated University of North Carolina lasted until 1972 when it was remade into the University of North Carolina system. By 1937 enrollment rebounded to over 2,000, but World War II caused enrollment to drop below 1,000. In 1937 Blake R. Van Leer joined as Dean and started the graduate program for engineering. In 1942, Van Leer successfully encouraged NC State's first women to pursue an engineering degree, 4-5 women would enroll and the first women graduated in 1941. One of his students Katharine Stinson became the Federal Aviation Administration's first female engineer.

== Expansion: 1945–present ==
After the end of World War II, State College experienced rapid growth due to the G.I. Bill. By 1947 enrollment was over 5,000 and the college expanded to accommodate the new students. The 1950s saw many building projects and national recognition of its academic programs. The period also saw the first admission of African Americans.

In 1962, administrators tried to elevate State College to university status as to North Carolina State University, but Governor Terry Sanford and other UNC system officials proposed the University of North Carolina at Raleigh for consistency. Faculty, students and alumni immediately launched a bitter opposition campaign, arguing that the name would cause the university to lose its identity and to appear to be a branch of the University of North Carolina at Chapel Hill. The name was never adopted. Instead the General Assembly changed the name to North Carolina State of the University of North Carolina at Raleigh in 1963. Not satisfied, protest and letter writing campaigns continued until 1965 when the university received its present name, North Carolina State University at Raleigh. However, longstanding convention ignores the "at Raleigh" part of the name, and in practice the school's name is North Carolina State University. The "at Raleigh" portion has long been omitted even on official university documents such as diplomas. The shorter names "North Carolina State University" and "NC State University" are accepted on first reference in news stories. School officials actually discourage using the full official name except when absolutely necessary, as "at Raleigh" implies that there is another branch of the university elsewhere in the state. However, it is still in the official name.

In 1966 single year enrollment reached 10,000. The 1970s saw enrollment surpass 19,000 and the addition of the School of Humanities and Social Sciences. NC State celebrated its centennial in 1987 and reorganized its internal structure renaming all its schools to colleges (e.g. School of Engineering to the College of Engineering). Also in this year, it gained 700 acres (2.8 km^{2}) of land that would later become the Centennial Campus. Over the next decade and a half, NC State has focused on developing its new Centennial Campus. Over $620 million has been invested in facilities and infrastructure at the new campus with 2,700,000 square feet (250,000 m^{2}) of space being constructed. There are 61 private and government agency partners located here as well.

Currently, NC State has over 8,000 employees, over 34,000 students, and a $1.2 billion annual budget. It is also widely recognized as one of the three anchors of North Carolina's Research Triangle, together with Duke University and the University of North Carolina at Chapel Hill.

In 2009, NC State University spent $10,000 on the "Rally for Talley" advertising campaign. The goal of the campaign was to persuade students to approve an increase in student fees that would pay for the renovation of the Talley Student Center and the Atrium Food Court. A record turnout of 19% of the student body voted 61% against the fee increase, but the student senate and university administration overruled the students' decision and enacted the fee anyway. The renovation project was complete in 2016.

NCSU Libraries Special Collections Research Center maintains a website devoted to NC State history entitled Historical State.

== Leaders ==
=== Presidents ===
- Alexander Q. Holladay, 1889-1899
- George T. Winston, 1899-1908
- Daniel Harvey Hill Jr., 1908-1916
- W. C. Riddick, 1916-1923
- Eugene C. Brooks, 1923-1934

=== Chancellors ===
- John W. Harrelson, 1934-1953 (as Dean of Administration until 1945)
- Carey Hoyt Bostian, 1953-1959
- John Tyler Caldwell, 1959-1975
- Jackson A. Rigney, 1975 (Interim)
- Joab Thomas, 1975-1981
- Nash Winstead, 1981-1982 (Interim)
- Bruce Poulton, 1982-1989
- Larry K. Monteith, 1989-1998
- Marye Anne Fox, 1998-2004
- Robert A. Barnhardt, 2004 (Interim)
- James L. Oblinger, 2005-2009
- Jim Woodward, 2009-2010 (Interim)
- Randy Woodson, 2010–Present

== Historic enrollment statistics (1889 - present) ==
Yearly counts were made until 1920, when yearly enrollment counts were replaced with seasonal (spring, summer, fall, winter) counts; separate summer session counts were introduced from the summer of 1951. All numbers from 1920 are for the fall semester.

- 1889-1890: 71
- 1891-1892: 110
- 1894-1895: 240
- 1900-1901: 301
- 1902-1903: 504
- 1903-1904: 856
- 1918-1919: 1,020 (surpassed enrollment of 1903–1904)
- 1921: 1,008
- 1924: 1,345
- 1928: 1,652
- 1929: 1,856 (enrollment subsequently dropped until 1935, due to the Great Depression)
- 1935: 1,959
- 1937: 2,100
- 1940: 2,531 (enrollment dropped until 1946 due to the Second World War)
- 1946: 4,902
- 1947: 5,334 (drop in enrollment until fall 1956)
- 1956: 5,579
- 1957: 5,766
- 1959: 6,122
- 1961: 7,117
- 1964: 8,878
- 1965: 9,806
- 1966: 10,203
- 1968: 11,994
- 1969: 12,691
- 1970: 13,340
- 1973: 14,257
- 1974: 15,751
- 1975: 17,471
- 1978: 18,476
- 1979: 19,597
- 1980: 21,225
- 1982: 22,468
- 1984: 23,602
- 1985: 24,023
- 1988: 25,537
- 1989: 26,209
- 1991: 27,236
- 1999: 28,011
- 2001: 29,286
- 2005: 30,149
- 2006: 31,130
- 2008: 32,872
- 2009: 33,819
- 2011: 34,767
- 2018: 35,479 (all-time high)

Current enrollment (2018-2019): 35,479 students
