= Robert W. Winston =

American lawyer and writer (1860–1944)

Robert Watson Winston (September 12, 1860 – October 14, 1944) was a North Carolina state legislator, lawyer and author who wrote substantial early 20th-century biographies of Andrew Johnson, Jefferson Davis, and Robert E. Lee. He attended the Horner School and the University of North Carolina. He was a North Carolina Superior Court judge from 1889 to 1895. He was a principal of the law firm Aycock & Winston, his partner being former North Carolina governor Charles B. Aycock.

The son of Patrick Henry Winston and Martha Byrd of Windsor Castle in Bertie County, his brother Francis D. Winston was a North Carolina lieutenant governor and also a North Carolina judge. Their brother George T. Winston was president of University of North Carolina Chapel Hill. Robert W. Winston contributed to the establishment of the Durham Public Library and the Bank of Chapel Hill, and was a president of the North Carolina Historical Society.

His daughter, Amy Winston, married the architect George Watts Carr.
