= Barnhardt =

Barnhardt is a surname. Notable people with the surname include:

- Luther E. Barnhardt (1903–1980), American politician
- Robert A. Barnhardt, American academic
- Tommy Barnhardt (born 1963), American football player
- Tyler Barnhardt (born 1993), American actor
- Wilton Barnhardt (born 1960), American writer and journalist
