= Horner Military Academy =

Old military school in North Carolina

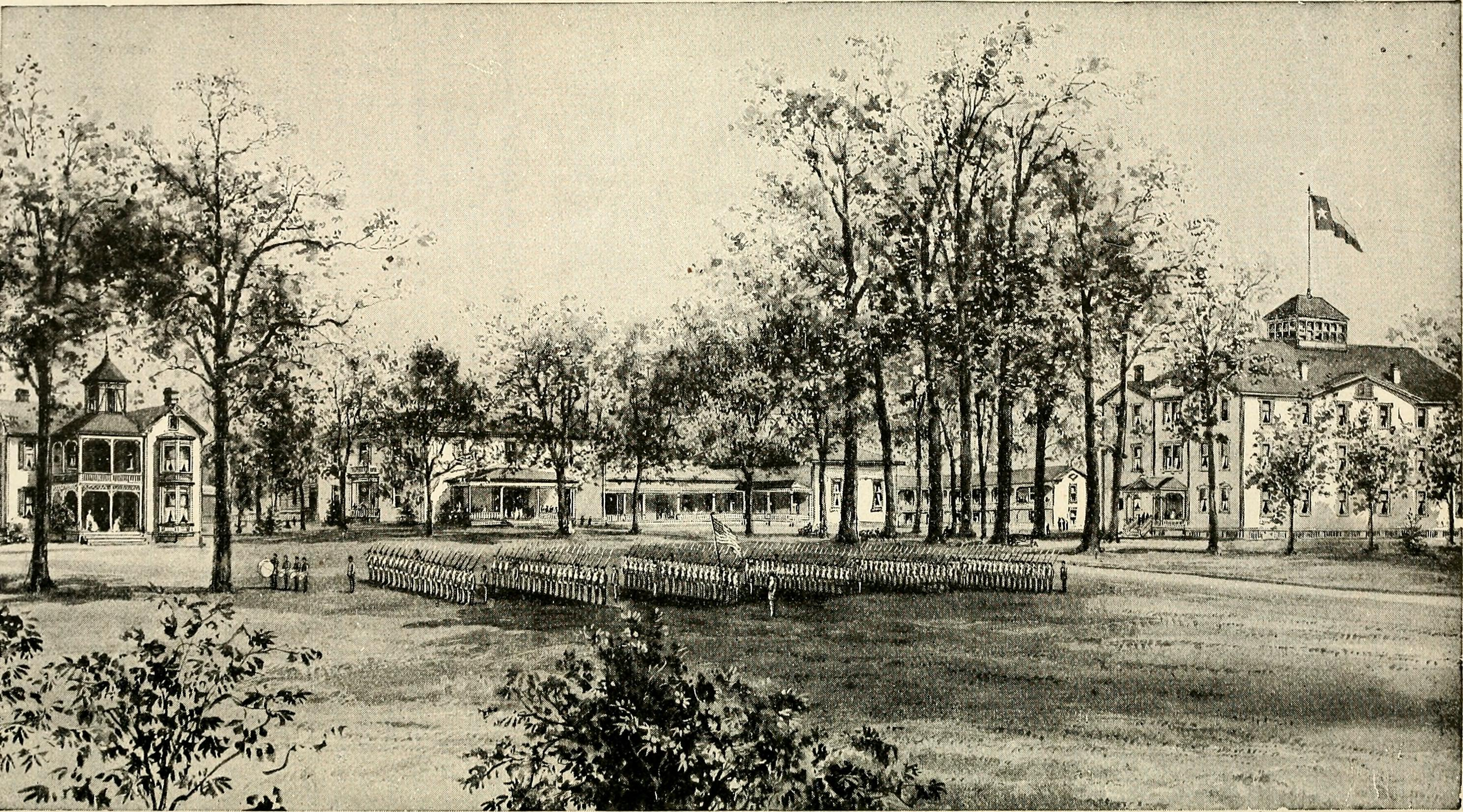
Horner Military Academy 1893

Horner Military School was a private educational institution in North Carolina that operated from 1851 until 1920.

== History ==
Founded by James Hunter Horner in 1851 in Oxford, North Carolina, it was initially known as the Horner School. An 1844 graduate of the University of North Carolina, Horner had previously taught at Hillsborough Academy and the Oxford Male Academy.

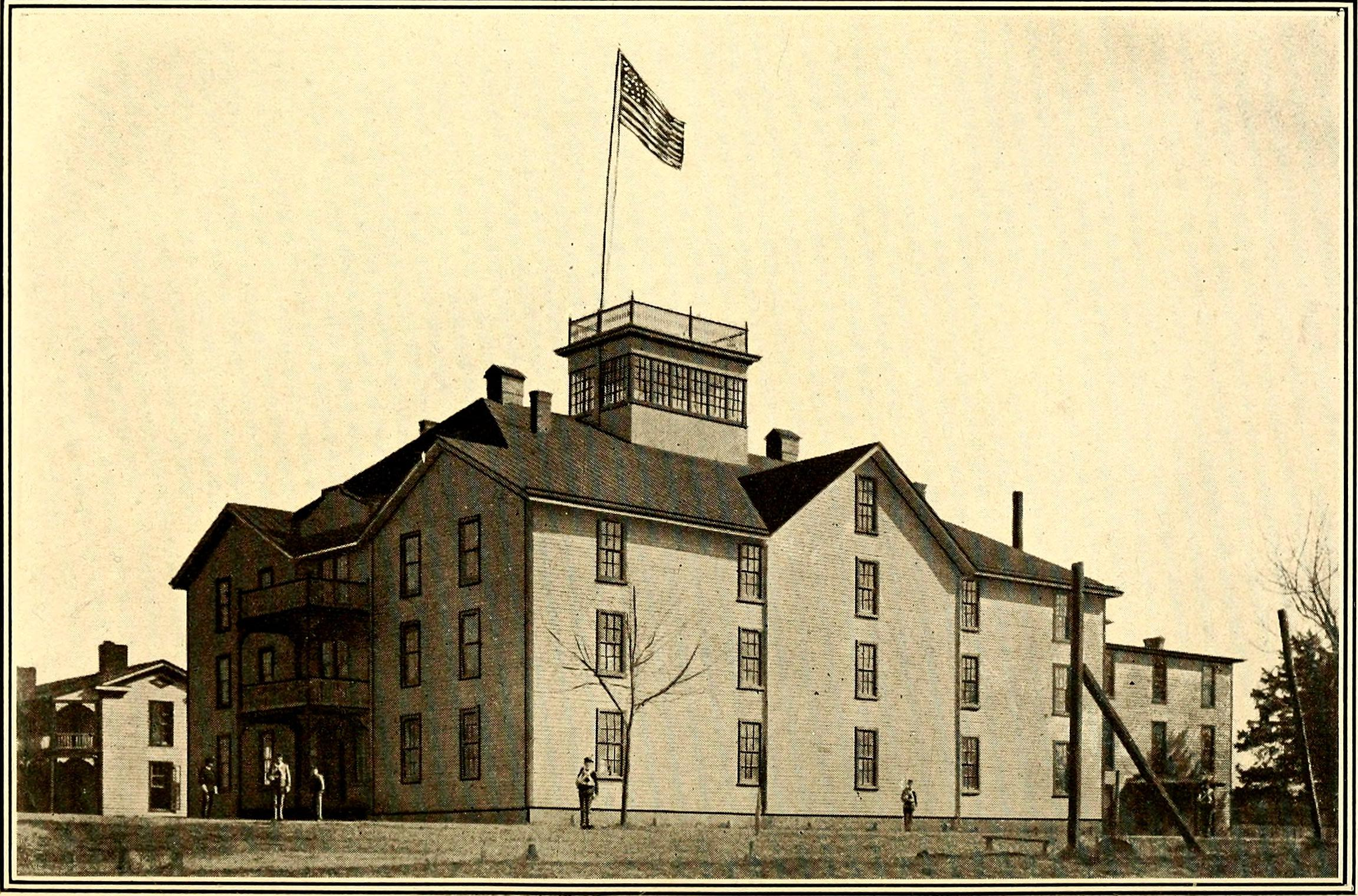
Main barracks 1903

Located on 390 acres on "Horner Hill", the school was run by Horner with assistance at various times from his wife Sophronia Moore Horner, his brother Rev. Thomas Jefferson Horner, his son Jerome Channing Horner with wife Elouise Kent Horner and son James Hunter Horner II, his son Junius Moore Horner, his daughters, and others. It was renamed the Horner and Graves School in 1870 and moved to Hillsborough in 1874. Horner was hospitalized in 1876 and the school returned to its original name and location in Oxford under the direction of his brother. In 1880, Jerome Horner became Principal of the school, and a military system was introduced with the curriculum described as "a classical, mathematical, English, scientific and military academy".

The main barracks building, built in 1891, was destroyed by fire in October 1913 and the school relocated to Charlotte in 1914. It was at that time housed in a "fireproof" concrete and brick building located on 50 acres at the highest point of the Myers Park area. The school closed in 1920.

== Legacy ==
The Myers Park Country Club bought much of the school grounds. The remodeled original building remains as a privately owned condominium known as the Country Club Rockledge.

A North Carolina Highway Historical Marker was placed at the Oxford site (Williamsboro St. at Military St.) in 1939.

== Alumni ==
Notable alumni

- James Crawford Biggs (1872-1960), U.S. Solicitor General
- George H. Brown (1850-1926), North Carolina Supreme Court Justice
- Joseph Penn Breedlove (1874-1955), Duke University librarian
- Jacques Busbee (1870-1947), Jugtown Pottery founder
- William Frederick Carr (1881-1956), Durham mayor
- Walter Clark, (1846-1924) North Carolina Supreme Court Chief Justice
- Lyman A. Cotten (1874-1926), U.S. Navy officer
- Albert Lyman Cox (1883-1965), jurist, legislator, U.S. Army major general
- Locke Craig (1860-1924), North Carolina Governor
- William A. Devin (1871-1959), North Carolina Supreme Court Chief Justice
- Robert Lee Durham (1870-1949), Southern Seminary founder
- William A. Graham Jr. (1839-1923), NC Commissioner of Agriculture
- Franklin Wills Hancock Jr. (1894-1969), U.S. Congressman
- Daniel Harvey Hill Jr. (1859-1924), NC State President
- Junius Horner (1859-1933), Bishop of Western North Carolina
- Hamilton C. Jones (1884-1957), U.S. Congressman
- William R. Kenan Jr. (1872-1965), scientist, philanthropist (Kenan Memorial Stadium)
- J. Elmer Long (1880-1955), North Carolina Lieutenant Governor
- McKendree Long (1888-1976), painter, minister
- James Bumgardner Murphy (1884-1950), Rockefeller Institute director of cancer research
- Walter Linton Parsley (1856-1941), businessman, Wilmington massacre leader
- Richmond Pearson, (1852-1923), U.S. Congressman, ambassador
- Lunsford Richardson (1854-1919), Vicks founder
- Thomas Gregory Skinner (1842-1907), U.S. Congressman
- Robert Strange (1857-1914), Bishop of East Carolina
- Hoyt Patrick Taylor (1890-1964), North Carolina Lieutenant Governor
- Robert Taylor Thorp (1850-1938), U.S. Congressman
- Allen H. Turnage (1891-1971), USMC general
- Platt D. Walker, (1849-1923), North Carolina Supreme Court Justice
- Richard Henry Whitehead (1865-1916), UNC and UVA medical school dean
- J. Wallace Winbourne (1884-1966), North Carolina Supreme Court Chief Justice
- Francis D. Winston (1857-1941), North Carolina Lieutenant Governor
- George T. Winston (1852-1932), UNC President, NC State President
- Patrick Henry Winston Jr. (1847-1904), Washington Attorney General
- Robert W. Winston (1860-1944), lawyer, legislator, author
- James R. Young (1853-1937), first NC Commissioner of Insurance

== Faculty ==
Notable faculty

- Louis S. Epes (1882-1935), Virginia Supreme Court Justice
- James Abbot Fishburne (1850-1921), Fishburne Military School founder
- J. G. de Roulhac Hamilton (1878-1961), educator, historian
- Cameron Farquhar McRae (1873-1954), Episcopalian missionary priest in China
- Henry G. Shirley (1874-1941), Virginia Department of Highways Commissioner
- William R. Webb (1842-1926), U.S. Senator, Webb School founder

== See also ==
- List of defunct military academies in the United States
