= Patrick Henry Winston (North Carolina) =

American lawyer, public official (1820–1886)

Patrick Henry Winston (1820–1886) was a North Carolina lawyer, state representative, and delegate to N.C.'s post-Civil War constitutional convention. His four sons became notable lawyers, judges, writers and educators:

- Patrick Henry Winston Jr.
- George Tayloe Winston
- Francis Donnell Winston
- Robert Watson Winston

== See also ==
- Joseph Winston
