= Xiaofeng Wang =

Xiaofeng Wang or Wang Xiaofeng may refer to:

- Wang Xiaofeng (politician), a Chinese politician who served as governor of Hainan Province from 1998 to 2003
- XiaoFeng Wang, a computer security researcher formerly affiliated with Indiana University Bloomington
