= XiaoFeng Wang =

Computer scientist

- 王晓峰
- This file has an invalid non-free use claim and may be deleted after Tuesday, 24 November 2026.
- Education: Nanjing University of Aeronautics and Astronautics (BEng); Shanghai Jiao Tong University (MEng); Carnegie Mellon University (PhD)
- Spouse: Ma Nianli (马念莉)
- Awards: IEEE Fellow (2018); AAAS Fellow (2022); ACM Fellow (2023)
- Scientific career
- Fields: Computer security; Cryptography
- Workplaces: Indiana University Bloomington; Nanyang Technological University
- Thesis: Multiagent coordination under untrusted and uncertain environments (2004)
- Doctoral advisor: Pradeep Khosla
- Website: Department page (archived); Faculty page (archived); Google Scholar page Personal website Department page

XiaoFeng Wang (Chinese: 王晓峰; pinyin: Wáng Xiǎofēng) is a Chinese-American computer scientist known for his research on computer security, cryptography, and privacy. Wang joined the faculty of Indiana University Bloomington (IU) in 2004. He was appointed as a full professor in 2015 and as the Associate Dean for Research in 2023 at IU's Luddy School of Informatics, Computing, and Engineering. He joined Nanyang Technological University in Singapore in July 2025, where he is now a President's Chair Professor and Associate Vice President for Cybersecurity and has been its Head of the Computing Division in the College of Computing and Data Science since January 2026.

In March 2025, Wang told IU he was planning to accept a position at another university after the end of the current academic year, and IU responded by putting him on administrative leave, locking him out of his office and laptop, disabling his email account, removing his faculty profile and contact information from the university website, and then firing him from his position by email a couple of weeks later without providing a reason for his dismissal. His wife, who also worked at IU, was similarly dismissed by email without explanation. On the same day he was fired, his two homes were searched by the United States FBI and Department of Homeland Security federal agencies. It was later reported that the university has been investigating whether Wang had properly revealed who he was collaborating with and the sources of the funding for his research – including whether he was receiving funding from China. Neither he nor his wife were arrested or charged with any crime. The faculty labor union and more than 250 members of the IU faculty and staff have protested the manner of his dismissal, including at least 32 faculty members of the computer science department.

== Biography ==
=== Education ===
Wang received a Bachelor of Engineering in computer science from the Nanjing University of Aeronautics and Astronautics in 1993, a Master of Engineering in computer science from Shanghai Jiao Tong University in 1996, and a Doctor of Philosophy in electrical and computer engineering from Carnegie Mellon University in 2004. His doctoral dissertation is titled Multiagent coordination under untrusted and uncertain environments (2004). His doctoral advisor was Pradeep Khosla, currently serving as the eighth chancellor of the University of California, San Diego.

=== Career ===
After PhD graduation, Wang joined Indiana University Bloomington's School of Informatics, Computing and Engineering in 2004 as a faculty member. He served as assistant professor from 2004 to 2010, as associate professor from 2010 to 2015, and as full professor from 2015 to 2025. He was named the James H. Rudy Professor of Computer Science, Engineering, and Informatics in 2017.

Wang was the lead principal investigator for the National Science Foundation (NSF) Center for Distributed Confidential Computing. This NSF project in secure and trustworthy computing involved faculty from IU (the lead), Carnegie Mellon University, Duke University, Ohio State University, Penn State, Purdue University, Spelman College, and Yale University. Wang was also the director of Indiana University's Center for Security and Privacy in Informatics, Computing, and Engineering (SPICE).

In the ACM, Wang has been the chair of the Special Interest Group on Security, Audit and Control (SIGSAC).

As of early March 2025, Wang was the associate dean for research; the James H. Rudy Professor of Computer Science, Engineering and Informatics; the director of Center for Security and Privacy in Informatics, Computing, and Engineering; and the director of Secure Computing at IU.

=== 2025 firing from university and investigation by FBI ===
Approximately on March 14, 2025, the university removed his profile and the profile of his wife and their contact information from its website, and his whereabouts became unknown to his students. The university did not explain its action, but it was later reported that the university had been investigating whether Wang had properly revealed who he was collaborating with and the sources of the funding for his research – including whether he was receiving funding from China. Wang had been notified in mid-February 2025 that someone had made misconduct allegations against him, saying he had misidentified the principal investigator for a grant and failed to disclose some co-authors of his research, and the university had opened a formal investigation by March. Asked about these allegations, Alex Tanford, the president of the IU Bloomington chapter of the American Association of University Professors, said "While these are technical violations of research protocols, they're not serious and they happen all the time." Tanford said that such allegations could raise concern and warrant investigation, but without a presumption of guilt for serious research misconduct.

On March 24, 2025, Wang's wife, whose position at the university did not include tenure, was fired from her position by email and notified that she would not be eligible to be rehired, with no reason given for her dismissal.

On March 28, 2025, Wang's homes in Bloomington and Carmel, Indiana, were searched by the Federal Bureau of Investigation and the United States Department of Homeland Security, and he was fired from the university on the same day. The notification that he had been fired was sent to him in a message sent only by email from university executive vice president and provost Rahul Shrivastav that said his employment was being terminated "effective immediately". The dismissal letter noted that Wang had informed the university of his intent to accept a new position at a different university and said he would be ineligible to be rehired by IU, but did not provide an explicit reason for his immediate dismissal.

The search warrants were initially sealed, and Riana Pfefferkorn, a researcher at the Stanford University Institute for Human-Centered AI, filed a motion asking the court to unseal them. The acting U.S. attorney of the Southern District of Indiana, John E. Childress, filed a response on April 17, arguing for continued secrecy. Wang's union representative had communicated with him as early as March 28, 2025, and a defense lawyer was present at his home during the search. On April 2, 2025, a defense attorney made a statement on his behalf, saying that neither Wang nor his spouse had been arrested or charged with a crime. On May 13, 2025, a judge ordered the U.S. Attorney to "show cause" for keeping the warrants sealed and to propose a redacted version of the warrant materials by May 27. Wang and his wife joined in requesting the unsealing of the search warrants on June 2.

On March 31, 2025, the Bloomington chapter of the American Association of University Professors sent a letter to IU saying that the university administration had fired Wang without due process and against the codified university policy and that he should be reinstated to the faculty. Later reports indicated that he was planning to leave IU to accept a position at a university in Singapore in June 2025 and had requested a leave of absence from the university in early March. The university had responded by putting him on administrative leave and locking him out of his office and laptop and disabling his email account before dismissing him by email a couple of weeks later. His union representative said that Wang's notification that he would be accepting a new position would not be a valid reason to fire him without allowing him to complete the current academic year as an IU faculty member. He also said the university's policy prohibits firing a tenured professor by email or without cause and requires at least a 10-day notice and the opportunity for a hearing. In cases without a finding of serious personal misconduct, the policy prescribes a one-year notice in writing before termination.

On April 2, 2025, 32 faculty members of the IU computer science department sent a letter to the university saying that Wang's "summary termination" was contrary to university policy and requesting the action to be revoked (19 by name and 13 anonymously). The letter said "Many of us are confused, saddened and frightened by the IU administration's actions." It acknowledged awareness that Wang is under investigation by law enforcement, but said "this alone cannot justify the termination of a tenured professor without following the due process to which all tenured faculty are entitled," and that "Treating a faculty colleague in this manner is undermining the university's ability to attract and retain high-caliber faculty members."

On April 17, 2025, Yuzhen Ye, the chair of the IU computer science department, whose name was first on the faculty protest letter's list of signatories, spoke at a campus protest rally held for the National Day of Action to defend higher education (a national event in which 179 university campuses participated), and she questioned the evidence that appeared to have been the basis of the allegation that Wang had not properly disclosed funding information. She said that a researcher had applied for a 2017–2018 grant in China without Wang's knowledge, and that Wang had provided supporting information to the university in response to their investigation. She said the situation "really could have unfolded in a very different way if IU administration had chosen to trust its own faculty or give them a fair chance to respond". She said "I'm really saddened that IU just terminated someone's appointment after this many years of dedicated contribution to the school."

On May 2, 2025, more than 250 members of the university faculty and staff issued a letter criticizing the handling of Wang's firing, calling for the university to reinstate him to the faculty and to follow its policy of providing due process for faculty dismissals.

US District Court judge Tanya Walton Pratt unsealed the search warrant applications for the raids on Wang's homes in early October 2025, revealing that the investigation claimed to be looking for evidence of research funding fraud by Wang. The affidavits used to establish probable cause for the search remained sealed. Pfefferkorn said the released information especially does not explain why Wang's wife was fired, since the warrant application contained no allegations against her. Pfefferkorn also noted that nothing indicated that Wang was being investigated for spying or was considered a threat to U.S. national security. As of the time when the warrant information was released, no criminal charges had still been filed against either Wang or his wife, and neither of them were the subject of deportation proceedings.

== Honors ==
Wang was recognized as a fellow of the IEEE in 2019, of the AAAS in 2022, and of the ACM in 2023.

== Personal life ==
Prior to their suspension and dismissal from IU, Wang lived in Bloomington, Indiana, with his wife Ma Nianli (马念莉), who was a systems analyst and programmer at the IU Library Technologies division. They also had a home in Carmel, Indiana, a northern suburb of Indianapolis about 70 miles (110 kilometers) from the IU campus. The couple also has a son, who was born in Indiana and launched a GoFundMe page to help fund his parents' legal defense.
