= Francis D. Winston =

American politician

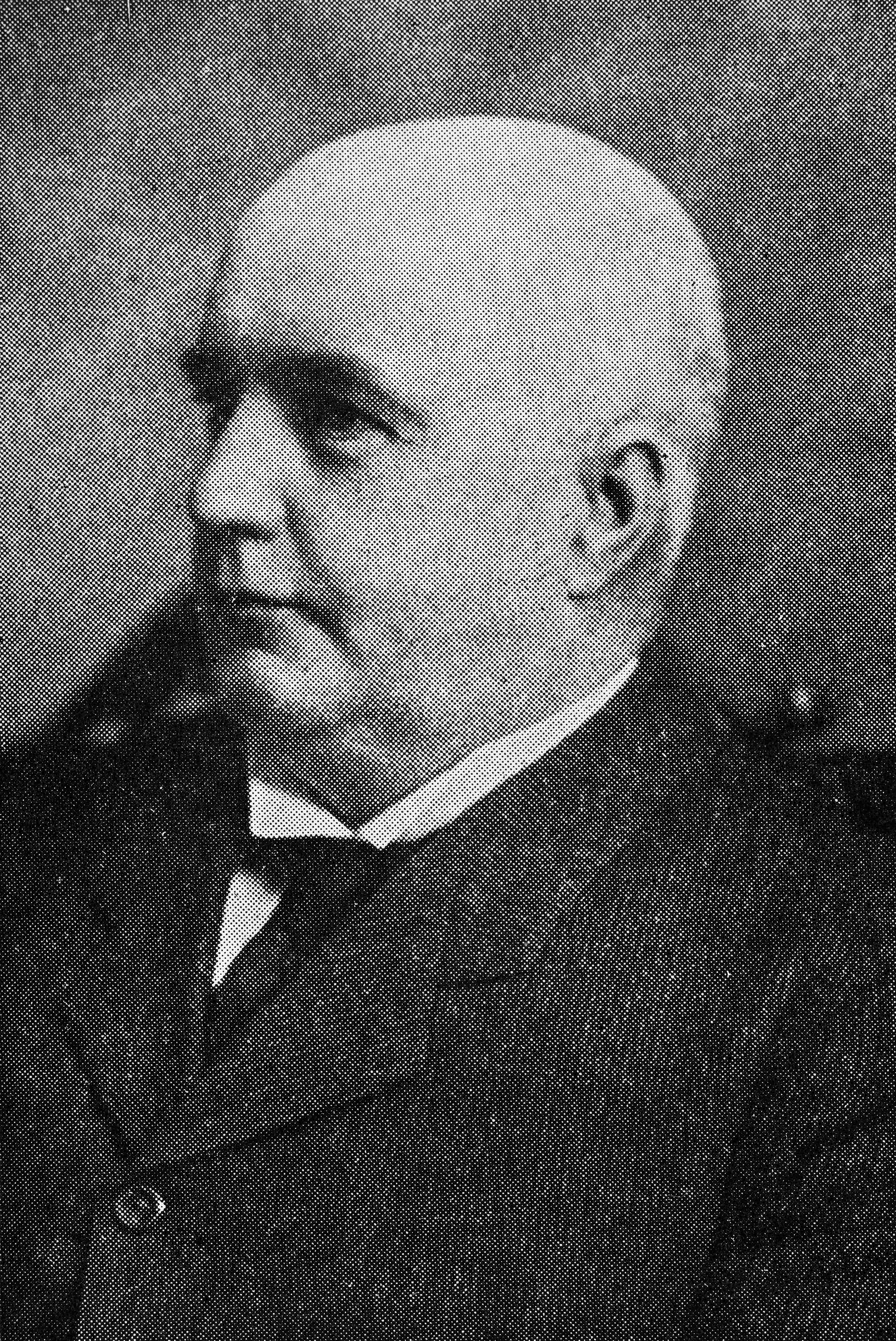
Francis D. Winston

Francis Donnell Winston (October 2, 1857 – January 26, 1941) was a North Carolina politician and judge who served as the tenth Lieutenant Governor of North Carolina from 1905 to 1909 under Governor Robert B. Glenn.

Francis Winston, originally a Republican, became a leading Democrat after objecting to the inclusion of African Americans in the political alliance between his party and the Populists. He helped lead the Democrats' white supremacy campaigns in 1898 —when he was elected to the North Carolina House of Representatives— and in 1900.

== Early life and education ==
Winston, son of Patrick H. Winston Sr. and Elizabeth Byrd, lived in Bertie County, North Carolina, where he was raised on a plantation in Windsor called "Windsor Castle." His brother was the university president George T. Winston.

After attending Horner Military Academy, Winston entered Cornell University in 1873 but did not graduate. When The University of North Carolina at Chapel Hill reopened in 1875, he transferred there as the first student to register. He graduated from UNC in 1879. The following year he taught school and studied law with his father, Patrick Henry Winston. In 1880, he attended Dick and Dillard Law School in Greensboro and obtained his license to practice law in 1881. This same year he was appointed Clerk of Court for Bertie County, a position which he held for two years. After this Winston entered into a successful law practice of his own in Bertie County.

== Political career ==
In 1884, Winston was the Republican nominee for North Carolina Superintendent of Public Instruction. In 1887, he represented Bertie and Northampton Counties in the North Carolina Senate (presumably as a Republican), and in 1898, he accepted the Democratic nomination for a seat in the House of Representatives, to which he was re-elected in 1900.

In 1901, Gov. Charles B. Aycock, a college friend of Winston, appointed him Judge of superior court for the second Judicial District.

In 1904, Winston was elected lieutenant governor. Under the constitution of the time, he was not eligible to serve more than a single term. He later served as United States Attorney for the Eastern District of North Carolina.

== Personal life ==
Winston married Rosa Mary Kenney. Although the Winstons had no children, they adopted a nephew, Stephen Etheridge Winston Kenney.

Francis Winston was an active Mason, serving as state Grand Master in 1906 and 1907. He also served as president of the North Carolina Bar Association.

Party political offices
Preceded by Archibald R. Black	Republican nominee for North Carolina Superintendent of Public Instruction; 1884	Succeeded by James B. Mason
Preceded by Wilfred D. Turner	Democratic nominee for Lieutenant Governor of North Carolina; 1904	Succeeded by William C. Newland
North Carolina Senate
Preceded by Thomas W. Mason	Member of the North Carolina Senate from the 3rd district 1887–1889	Succeeded by Benjamin T. Copeland
North Carolina House of Representatives
Preceded by King W. White	Member of the North Carolina House of Representatives from Bertie County; 1899–1903	Succeeded by D.W. Britton
Political offices
Preceded by Wilfred D. Turner	Lieutenant Governor of North Carolina; 1905–1909	Succeeded by William C. Newland
Legal offices
Preceded by Herbert F. Seawell	United States Attorney for the Eastern District of North Carolina; 1913–1916	Succeeded by James O. Carr
