= Pradeep Khosla =

8th Chancellor of UC San Diego

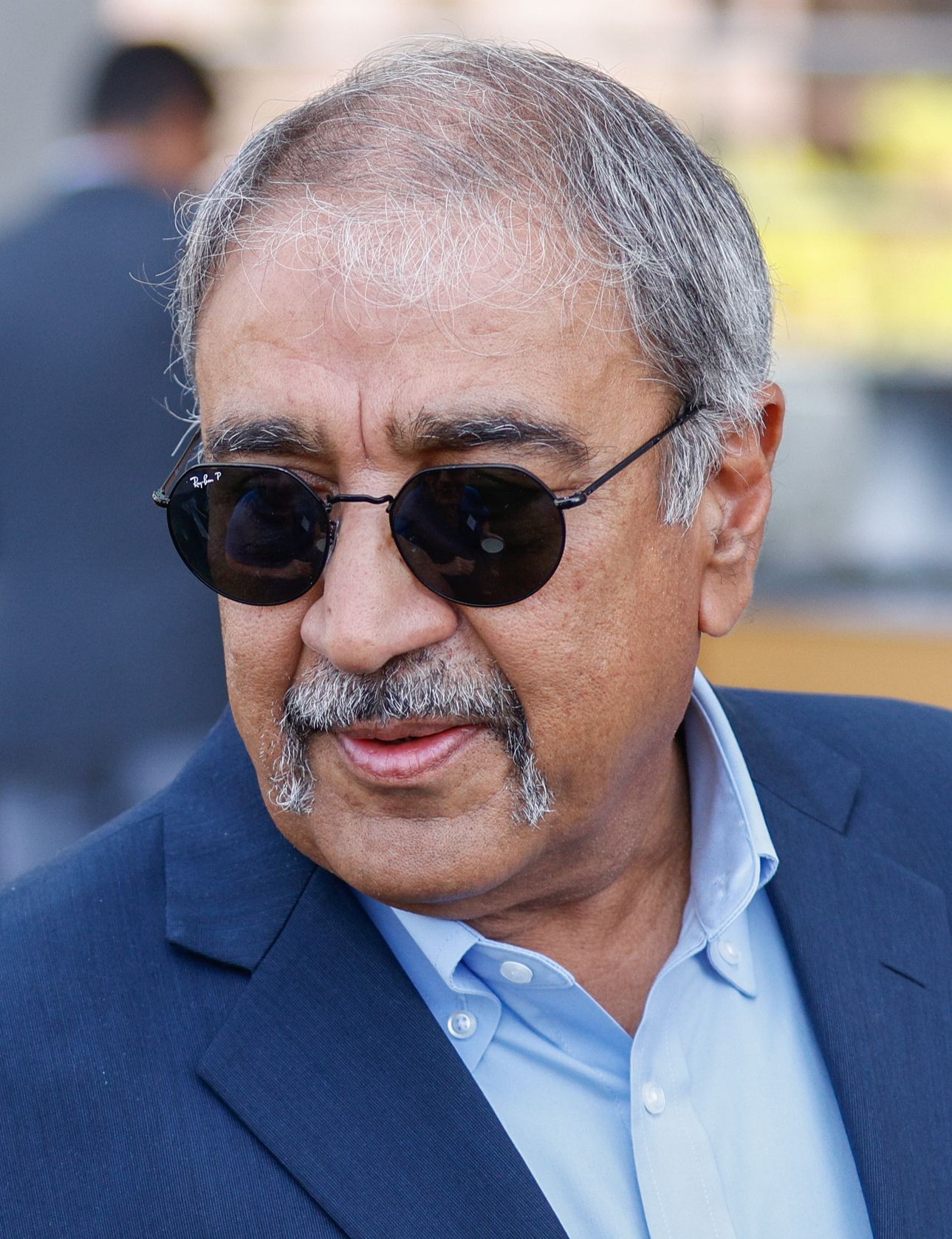
- Khosla in 2023

8th Chancellor of the University of California, San Diego
- Incumbent
- Assumed office August 1, 2012
- Preceded by: Marye Anne Fox

Personal details
- Born: Pradeep Kumar Khosla; March 13, 1957 (age 69) Bombay, India (now Mumbai)
- Education: Indian Institute of Technology, Kharagpur (BTech); Carnegie Mellon University (MS, PhD)
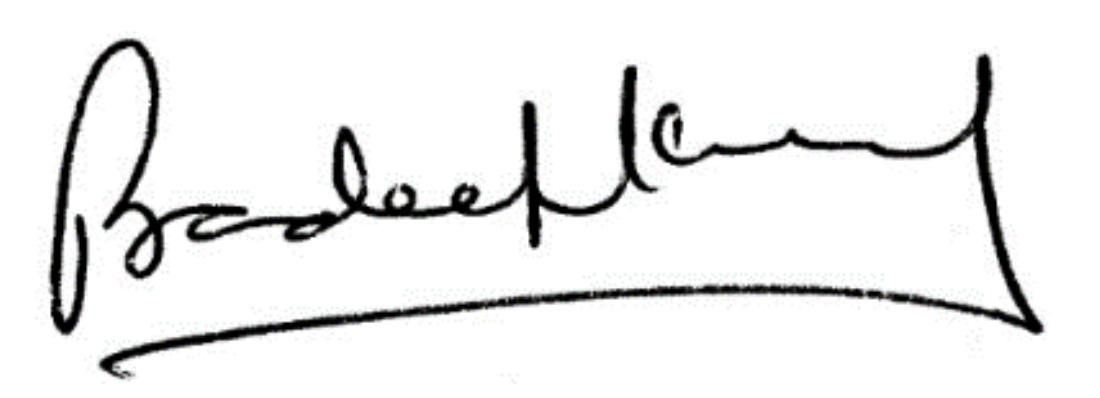
- Signature
- Scientific career
- Fields: Electrical engineering
- Workplaces: Carnegie Mellon University; University of California, San Diego
- Thesis: Real-time control and identification of direct-drive manipulators (robotics) (1986)
- Doctoral advisor: Takeo Kanade
- Doctoral students: XiaoFeng Wang

Pradeep Kumar Khosla (born March 13, 1957) is an Indian-American computer scientist, currently serving as the 8th chancellor of the University of California, San Diego, since August 2012.

He is also a former electrical engineering professor and dean at the Carnegie Mellon College of Engineering.

== Career ==
He was born in Mumbai, India. He completed his Bachelor of Technology degree with honors from IIT Kharagpur in 1980. He received a MS degree and a PhD degree from Carnegie Mellon University (CMU). He became an assistant professor in 1986 and a professor in 2008 at CMU where he held several administrative and leadership positions. In 2004, he was appointed Dean at CMU and again in 2009.

He serves and has served on the advisory boards of several universities, committees, corporations and government organizations.These include DARPA, CSIRO, World Economic Forum, National Research Council, NASA etc.

In 2012, Khosla was appointed the eighth chancellor of the University of California, San Diego. His term began August 1, 2012, following the resignation of the previous chancellor, Marye Anne Fox.

Khosla became the highest-paid Chancellor in the UC system after he received a $500,000 annual raise in April 2023, bringing his total salary to $1.14 million. The raise was funded entirely by private donations to a new endowed chair.

He chaired the Engineering and Computer Science jury for the Infosys Prize from 2011 to 2018.

== Research ==
Khosla’s research has resulted in three books and more than 350 journal articles and conference and book contributions. His interests are multidisciplinary, encompassing the areas of internet-enabled collaborative design and distributed manufacturing, collaborating autonomous systems, agent-based architectures for distributed design and embedded control, software composition and reconfigurable software for real-time embedded systems, reconfigurable and distributed robotic systems, integrated design-assembly planning systems and distributed information systems.

== Achievements ==
Khosla is the recipient of several awards including the ASEE George Westinghouse Award (1999), the Silicon-India Leadership award for Excellence in Academics and Technology (2000), the W. Wallace McDowell Award from IEEE Computer Society (2001), the Cyber Education Champion Award from the Business Software Alliance (2007), Lifetime Achievement Award of the Computers and Information in Engineering Division of the American Society of Mechanical Engineers (ASME) (2009), and the Pan IIT Academic Excellence Award (2009).

He has also been elected as a Fellow of IEEE (1995), the Association for the Advancement of Artificial Intelligence (AAAI) (2003), the American Association for the Advancement of Science (AAAS) (2004), the American Society of Mechanical Engineers (ASME) (2010), and member of the National Academy of Engineering (NAE) (2006).

== Criticism from 2024 Pro-Palestine Encampment ==
On May 1, 2024, Students for Justice in Palestine (SJP) San Diego organized and established a campsite on Library Walk Lawn, next to UC San Diego Health Clinic, to protest against Israeli military operations in Palestine. The encampment lasted until May 6, when it ended with police forces in riot gear and carrying batons disassembling the camps and dispersing the protesters. Police arrested 64 individuals (40 students and 24 non-affiliates) during the operation. All arrested individuals were later released on the same day.

Following this operation, UC San Diego and Chancellor Khosla received criticism from various organizations, students, and faculty members. Critics focused on the use of police force against what they described as a peaceful protest and the perceived intimidation tactics used during the encampment.

University correspondence stated that the decision to deploy police forces was due to concerns over campus safety and accessibility, claiming the encampment had severely disrupted these aspects as it had grown to three times its original size. The Office of the Chancellor also issued several notices reminding the community that the encampment was in violation of San Diego law and UC San Diego policy, citing potential consequences such as interim suspension, contract termination (in the case of UC San Diego staff), or arrest. Critics, however, challenged these claims and pointed to the use of police as a significant issue.

The Literature, Ethnic Studies, and Music departments of UC San Diego released statements in opposition to the University's handling of the encampment, signed by some of their respective faculty members. Among other demands, some of these letters demanded Khosla's resignation and a reevaluation of UC San Diego's protest policies. On the students' side, the presidents of the student councils of Revelle College, Warren College, Eleanor Roosevelt College, and John Muir College issued statements similarly in opposition to the University and Khosla. Jewish Voice for Peace and the Student Promoted Access Center for Education and Services released similar statements. The United Auto Workers (UAW) decided to vote for authorization to strike in response to the clearing of the encampment, as union members were among those arrested. The Associated Students, Che Cafe Collective, Groundwork Bookstore, General Store Collective, UC San Diego Food Cooperative, and KSDT Radio also expressed their solidarity with the Gaza Solidarity Encampment and condemned the use of police.

== Allegations of professional misconduct ==
Khosla was sued in June 2019 by former UC San Diego associate vice chancellor of Health Sciences Jean Ford. Ford's lawsuit alleged that Chancellor Khosla verbally harassed and discriminated against female employees during her time at UC San Diego. A settlement was reached in 2020. In November 2022, the UC Regents and Compliance and Audit Officer of UC Regents, Alexander Bustamente, were sued for retaliation in violation of labor codes regarding a whistleblower complaint investigation of Khosla in 2018. The lawsuit alleged that, "the UC Regents and Bustamente protected Khosla by choosing not to allow investigations into gender discrimination allegations against Khosla and by removing[...]submitted findings regarding Khosla’s bullying, alcohol use, discrimination, and other inappropriate and illegal behavior." The investigation involved nine current and former UC San Diego employees.

Academic offices
Preceded by Marye Anne Fox	8th Chancellor of the University of California San Diego; 2012–present	Incumbent
