= Henry G. Shirley =

American civil servant (1874–1941)

- Born: 1874; Locust Dale, Jefferson County, West Virginia, U.S.
- Died: July 16, 1941 (aged 66–67); Richmond, Virginia, U.S.
- Resting place: Hollywood Cemetery; Richmond, Virginia, U.S.
- Education: Virginia Military Institute; University of Maryland
- Known for: Commissioner Virginia Department of Highways
- Spouses: Alice Robertson Graham (m. 1904; died 1916) Sara Anne Berkeley (m. 1930)
- Children: 5

Henry Garnett Shirley (1874 – July 16, 1941) was an American engineer and soldier, from 1922 Commissioner of Highways for the Virginia Department of Transportation. He was a leader in national highway policy and oversaw the development of an extensive state highway system in Virginia.

== Early life ==
Henry Garnett Shirley was born in Locust Dale in Jefferson County, West Virginia, the son of Robert Vinson Shirley and Julia Moore Baylor. He attended Charles Town Academy. He graduated from the Virginia Military Institute in 1896 with a civil engineering degree and later earned a doctorate degree from the University of Maryland. He played on the football team at the Virginia Military Institute.

== Career ==
From 1898 to 1900, Shirley served as commandant of cadets and professor of military science at Horner Military School in Oxford, North Carolina. He then served in the United States Volunteers during the Spanish–American War. After the war, Shirley worked for the New York Central and Hudson River Railroad and other railroad companies and for the engineering department of the District of Columbia. He was roads engineer for Baltimore County, Maryland from 1904 to 1912, and chief engineer of the Maryland State Roads Commission. During World War I, he served on the Highway Transport Committee, Council of National Defense, helping keep the roads of the nation in shape to handle military traffic. In 1918, he became executive secretary of the Federal Highway Council. Around 1920, Shirley worked again as a roads engineer for Baltimore County.

In 1922, Shirley was appointed as State Highway Commissioner by Virginia Governor E. Lee Trinkle. He continued to serve under Governors Harry F. Byrd, John Garland Pollard, George C. Peery, and James H. Price until his death. The Department of Highways was created as a state agency in 1927. He was a founder and served as the first president of the American Association of State Highway and Transportation Officials. He approved and promoted plans for the first limited access highway in Virginia, extending from Route 1 in Northern Virginia to the 14th Street Bridge in Washington, D.C. Construction on the highway began shortly after his death. This road was named as the Henry G. Shirley Memorial Highway in his honor, and now is part of I-95 and I-395.

== Personal life ==
Shirley married twice. He married Alice Robertson Graham, of Oxford, North Carolina, daughter of Judge A. W. Graham Sr., in 1904. She died in 1916 and they had five children. He later married Sara Anne Berkeley in 1930.

Shirley was a first cousin of James William Shirley who was a member of the West Virginia House of Delegates, representing Jefferson County.

Shirley died on July 16, 1941, at his home in Richmond. He was buried at Hollywood Cemetery in Richmond.
