= Nash Winstead =

American academic (1925–2008)

- Born: Nash Nicks Winstead; June 12, 1925; Durham County, North Carolina, U.S.
- Died: October 18, 2008 (aged 83)
- Occupation: Academic

Academic background
- Education: North Carolina State College (BS, MS); University of Wisconsin–Madison (PhD)

Nash Nicks Winstead (June 12, 1925 – October 18, 2008) was an American academic.

== Early life and education ==
He was born in Durham County, North Carolina, in 1925 and educated at North Carolina State College, located in Raleigh, North Carolina, where he earned a Bachelor of Science degree in agronomy in 1948 and a Master of Science degree in plant pathology in 1951. He earned a Doctor of Philosophy degree from the University of Wisconsin–Madison, located in Madison, Wisconsin, in 1953.

== Career ==
Winstead joined the N.C. State faculty as an assistant professor in 1953. In 1965, he was appointed director of the Institute of Biological Sciences and assistant director of agricultural experiment stations at N.C. State. He was then appointed as the university's assistant provost in 1967 and associate provost in 1973. In the following year, 1974, Winstead became provost and vice chancellor. Upon the resignation of Joab Thomas in 1981, Winstead served as interim chancellor until 1982. After the appointment of Bruce Poulton, Winstead returned to the office of provost until his retirement in 1990.

NCSU Libraries Special Collections Research Center serves as the repository for Nash Winstead's manuscript collection.

In 1999, N.C. State published Winstead's manuscript The Provost's Office North Carolina State University An Informal History 1955–1993.

Winstead died on October 18, 2008, aged 83.

== See also ==
- List of North Carolina State University people
- List of University of Wisconsin–Madison people
