= John W. Harrelson =

John William Harrelson
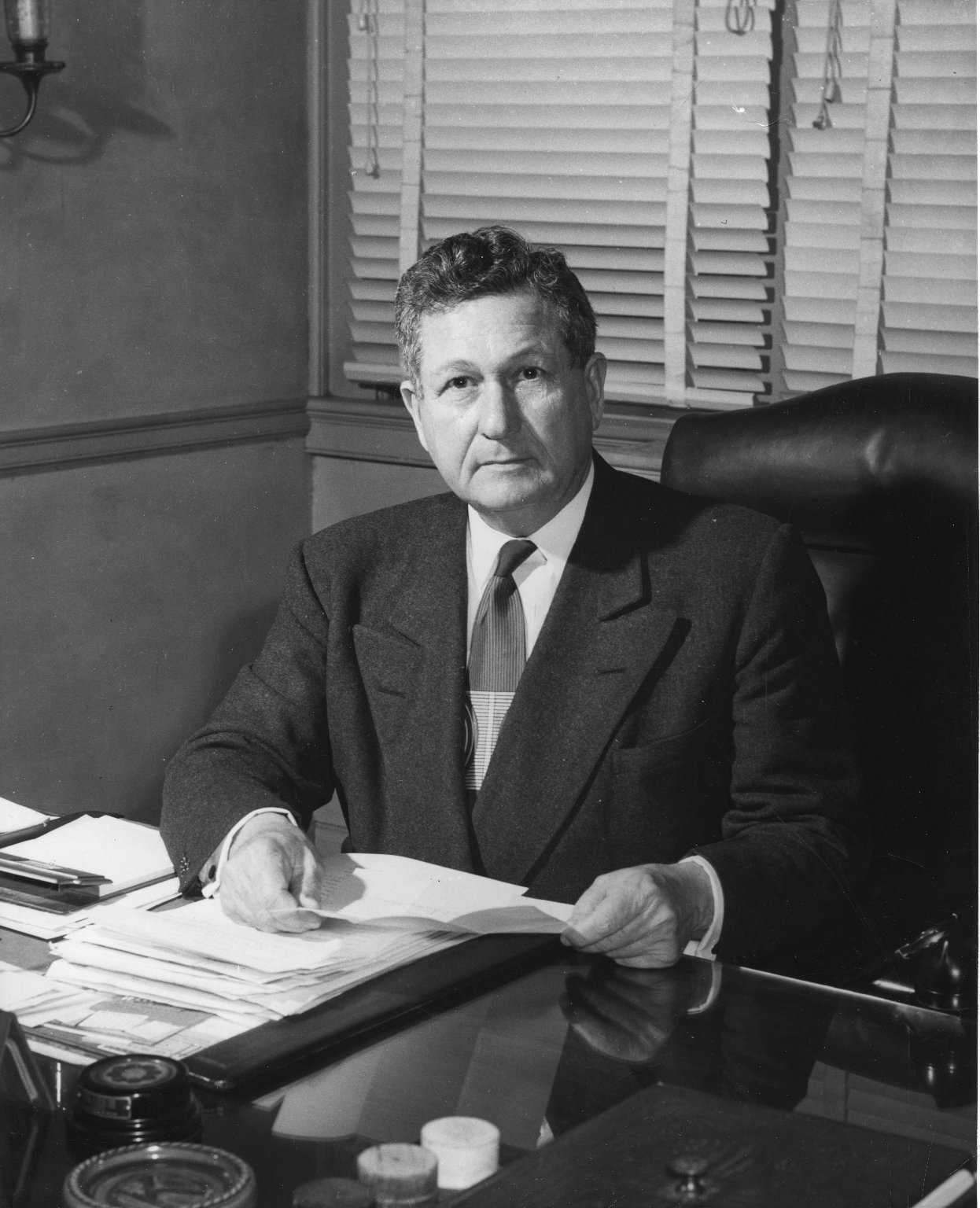

First Chancellor of North Carolina State University
- In office 1934-1953
- Preceded by: Eugene C. Brooks (as president)
- Succeeded by: Carey Hoyt Bostian

Personal details
- Born: June 28, 1885 Double Shoals, North Carolina
- Died: March 12, 1955 (aged 69) Raleigh, North Carolina
- Military career
- Allegiance: United States
- Branch: United States National Guard (North Carolina Army National Guard); United States Army Reserve
- Service years: 1908, 1915-1945
- Rank: Colonel
- Unit: N.C. Army National Guard Coastal Artillery Corps
- Commands: 316th Field Artillery Regiment; 534th Coast Artillery Regiment; 7th Company, Coastal Artillery; 1st Company, Coastal Artillery
- Conflicts: World War I World War II

John William Harrelson (June 28, 1885 – March 12, 1955) was the sixth chief executive of North Carolina State College (now North Carolina State University) from 1934 to 1953. An artillery officer in the U.S. Army Reserve, he was the first N.C. State alumnus to lead the institution and the first leader of the university to hold the title of Chancellor.

== Biography ==
Harrelson was born in Double Shoals, North Carolina, though his postal address was listed as Lawndale, North Carolina. The son of Cleveland County farmer J. H. Harrelson, he was educated at Piedmont High School and then at N. C. State. Though he apparently enrolled initially as a textiles student, he changed his major to mechanical engineering by his sophomore year. He joined the college's Corps of Cadets in his sophomore year as a cadet corporal, and was promoted cadet first sergeant the following year. In July 1908, he enlisted in Company G of the 1st North Carolina Infantry, N. C. Army National Guard, serving a single term of enlistment. He was appointed captain of his cadet company in the fall of 1908, and was commended for his drilling abilities at a competition held on 16 October. Apart from his army training, Harrelson also served as historian of his sophomore class, as vice-president of his junior class, and as a commencement marshal in his senior year. He was also awarded honors in his sophomore and senior years.

Harrelson graduated from the university in 1909 with a B.A. in engineering. After completing his bachelor's degree, Harrelson returned to N.C. State as an instructor of mathematics in the fall of 1909, teaching arithmetic, algebra, and plane and solid geometry, subsequently becoming a professor. During 1909 he also became a Freemason. In October 1915, he was commissioned a first lieutenant in the 1st Company of the North Carolina National Guard Coast Artillery Corps. In the same year, he completed an M.S. in mechanical engineering from N.C. State and was promoted to assistant professor of mathematics.

In August 1916, Harrelson was promoted to captain in the National Guard and was assigned command of the 1st Company, Coast Artillery, then stationed in Raleigh. Following the U.S. entry into World War I in 1917, Harrelson took a leave of absence from N. C. State and was mobilized into the U.S. Army on July 25. He was given command of a training company at Fort Caswell, which included about 30 N.C. State alumni. In early 1918, he was posted on training courses in heavy artillery and anti-aircraft training at the Heavy Artillery School at Fort Monroe, Virginia. He resumed his command of the 7th Company at Fort Caswell on July 3, and until August 1918 also served as commander of the 1st Group Command, and as chief gunnery officer and commanding officer in charge of the post officers' school at Fort Caswell. Harrelson was noted for his performance as a company commander, with his training company having produced 26 commissioned officers by that time. He was promoted to major in the National Army on August 9, 1918, and was subsequently assigned to a post in Washington on the general staff in the office of Peyton C. March, the Chief of Staff of the United States Army. In this role, he took command of the personnel branch and wrote discharges for officers, including for himself.

Harrelson was demobilized in August 1919 with the rank of major, and returned to the college. In December 1920, he was transferred to the N.C. Field Artillery Corps of Organized Reserves. In the same month, he was commissioned a lieutenant colonel in the Coast Artillery Reserve, and was promoted to colonel on January 29, 1923, which led to him being popularly known as "Colonel Harrelson" at the State College. Apart from teaching, Harrelson also served as a freshman football coach and as the graduate manager of athletics in 1921. Subsequently given command of the 534th Coast Artillery Regiment, on December 20, 1927, Harrelson was transferred to command the 316th Field Artillery Regiment, 156th Field Artillery Brigade, 81st Division, reporting to Brigadier General Albert Lyman Cox. In 1929 he was appointed by Governor O. Max Gardner to head the State Department of Conservation and Development. He left the office in 1933 to head the Department of Mathematics at N.C. State.

Harrelson was a member of the local engineering fraternity Alpha Sigma Epsilon which became a chapter of Theta Tau in 1924. He was initiated as the second charter member of the new chapter.

In 1934, following a reorganization at the Consolidated University of North Carolina, Harrelson was appointed as the first "Dean of Administration" at N.C. State; the school's sixth chief executive and the first alumnus to lead the school. He was also appointed the North Carolina civilian aide to the Secretary of War the same year. In this appointment, he participated in the Carolina Maneuvers in the autumn of 1941 as the coordinator for the North Carolina exercises, spending two weeks on active duty. With the outbreak of war, Harrelson was appointed chairman of N.C. State Council of Civilian Defense. On February 25, 1943, Harrelson was recalled to permanent active duty, becoming the first head of a major Southern college to be so assigned. Effective March 8, he was assigned to the training section of the Fourth Service Command, helping to manage military training programs in U.S. colleges and universities. In his absence during World War II, regular university affairs were administered by the faculty council. His title was changed to "Chancellor" in 1945. Harrelson oversaw the establishment of the School of Design and the School of Forestry.

Harrelson retired from office in 1953 and became the college archivist. He left a $100,000 endowment to NC State for art purchases and a lecture series. In 1954, he was awarded the honorary degree of Doctor of Engineering. On the evening of Saturday, 12 March 1955, Harrelson was scheduled to give the main address, "Recollections of D.H. Hill," at the dedication of the new D.H. Hill Library building. Shortly after 8 p.m., he rose from his seat and stepped up to a microphone and podium in front of the circulation desk. Harrelson then began speaking, but before he could finish his first sentence, he suddenly collapsed to the floor, knocking over the microphone as he fell. He was rushed to Rex Hospital and placed under an oxygen tent, but was pronounced dead from a cerebral haemorrhage at 10:10 p.m.

Harrelson died at age 69. In his will, he left bequests to purchase outstanding mathematics works for the library, for a distinguished lecture series and for purchasing artworks for campus buildings including the library and student union.

== Legacy ==
In 2003, Harrelson was posthumously inducted into the Theta Tau Alumni Hall of Fame. In 1961, Harrelson Hall, a classroom building on the university's Main Campus housing mathematics and languages courses, was named after Harrelson. Notable for its unique cylindrical design, the building remained in use until 2015, shortly before its deconstruction in 2016.

NCSU Libraries Special Collections Research Center currently houses John William Harrelson's manuscript papers and university archives.
