= Lisa M. Porter =

American materials scientist

Lisa Marie Spellman Porter
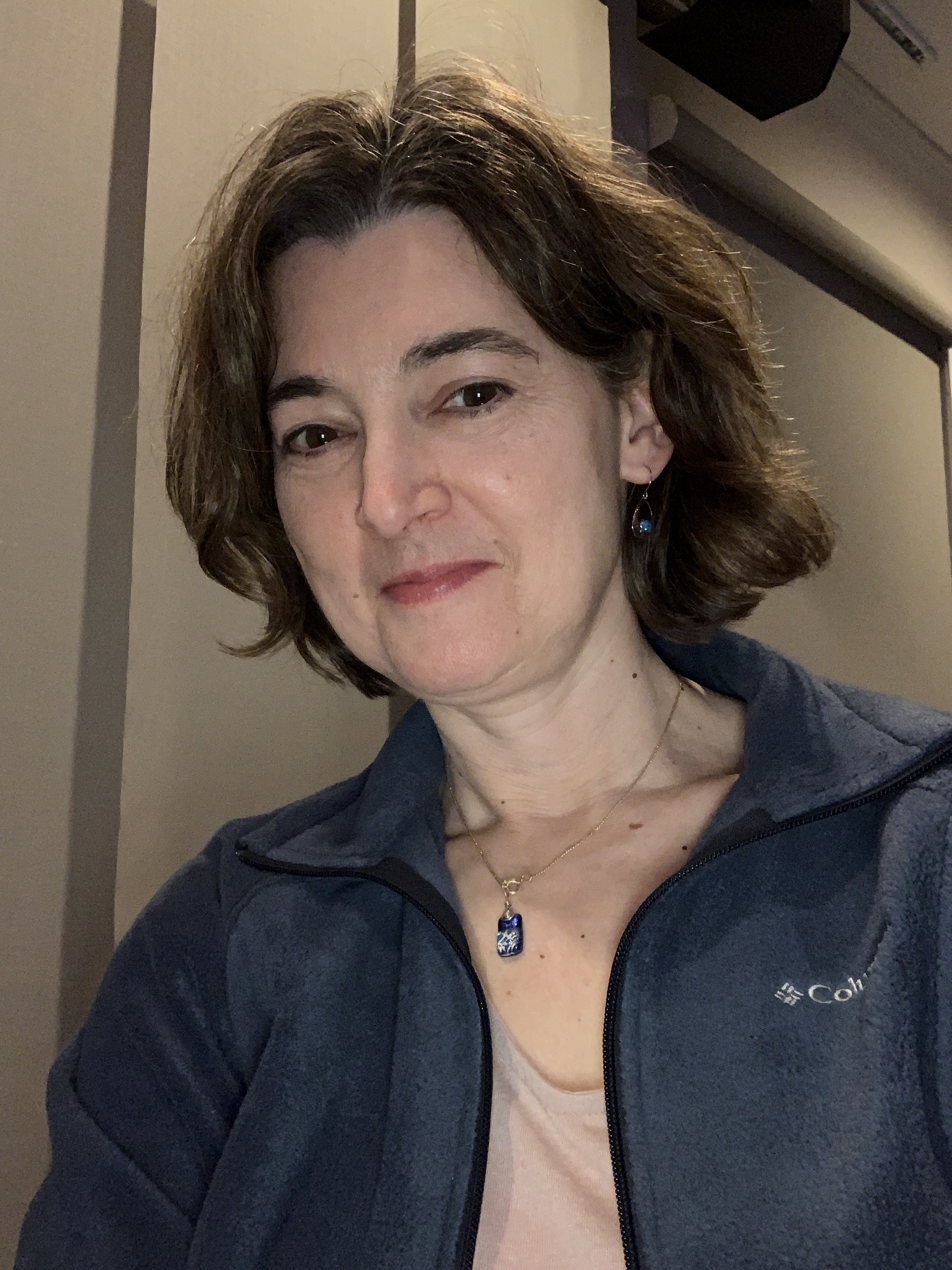
- Lisa M. Porter, March 2020
- Education: North Carolina State University (PhD); Cornell University (BSc)
- Scientific career
- Workplaces: Carnegie Mellon University
- Thesis: Chemistry, microstructure, and electrical properties and their relationships to the Schottky barrier heights at interfaces between metals and single crystalline, N-type, alpha (6H) silicon carbide (1993)

Lisa Marie Spellman Porter is an American materials scientist who is a Professor of Materials Science at Carnegie Mellon University. She works on new ways to process and characterise electronic materials. She has previously served as president of the American Vacuum Society.

== Early life and education ==
Porter studied materials science at Cornell University. She earned her bachelor's degree in 1989, before moving to North Carolina State University for her graduate studies. She completed her doctorate on silicon carbide in 1993. After earning her doctorate, Porter joined North Carolina State University as a postdoctoral research associate.

== Research and career ==
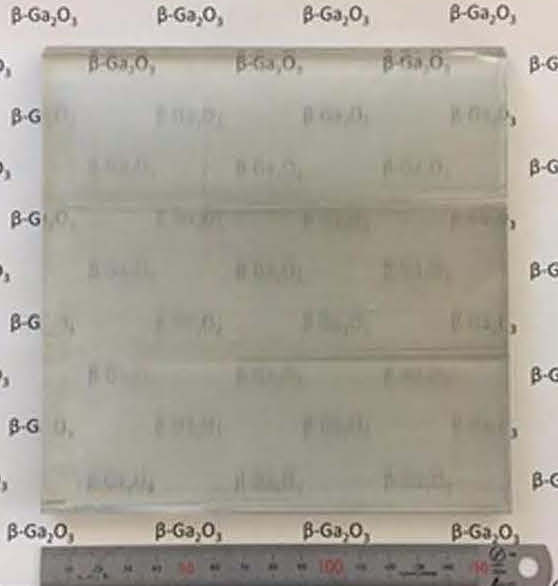
Gallium(III) oxide crystal

Porter was appointed to the faculty at Carnegie Mellon University at 1997. Her early research considered the metal contacts for high-power electronic devices and oxide–silicon carbide interfaces. She has since investigated several materials, including transparent conducting films and electrodes as well as organic semiconductors. Her research focusses on the wide bandgap semiconductor gallium oxide. Small amounts of gallium oxide can withstand high electric fields and can be used for highly energy intensive processes. Porter has studied a variety of gallium oxide]polymorphs, including α, β and ε-Ga_{2}O_{3.} In particular, β-Ga_{2}O_{3} bulk single crystals can be fabricated using low-cost melt-growth methods and can be produced in large wafers.

Porter created the spin-out company SenSevere, which creates chemical sensors based on semi-conductors. The sensors can be used to detect hydrogen in harsh environments, including nuclear reactors and chlorine production cells. When these cells are producing chlorine they produce considerable concentrations of hydrogen, and if this is not removed quickly from the system can result in the formation of hydrogen chloride. In nuclear reactors, hydrogen build up can cause explosions when hydrogen interacts with oxygen and water.

== Awards and honours ==
- 1999 National Science Foundation CAREER Award
- 2006 Women and Girls Foundation Women Driving the Material World award
- 2012 Carnegie Mellon University Philbrook Prize in Engineering
- 2018 North Carolina State University Hall of Fame
- 2018 President of the American Vacuum Society

== Selected publications ==
- Porter, Lisa M.; Davis, Robert F. (November 1995). "A critical review of ohmic and rectifying contacts for silicon carbide". Materials Science and Engineering: B. 34 (2–3): 83–105. doi:10.1016/0921-5107(95)01276-1. ISSN 0921-5107.
- Crofton, John; Mohney, Suzanne (2000-08-31). "Ohmic Contacts to P-Type SiC". Fort Belvoir, VA. doi:10.21236/ada381452.
- Chang, K. C.; Nuhfer, N. T.; Porter, L. M.; Wahab, Q. (2000-10-02). "High-carbon concentrations at the silicon dioxide–silicon carbide interface identified by electron energy loss spectroscopy". Applied Physics Letters. 77 (14): 2186–2188. Bibcode:2000ApPhL..77.2186C. doi:10.1063/1.1314293. ISSN 0003-6951.
