= John Tyler Caldwell =

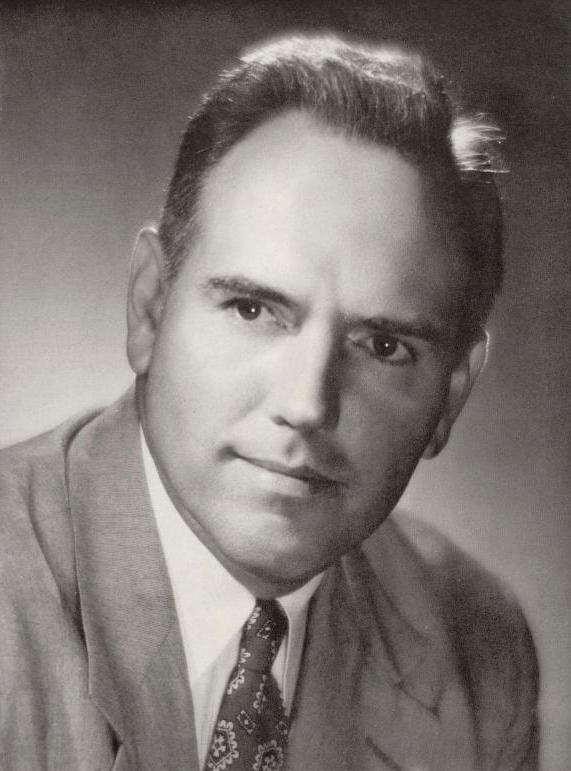
- Caldwell pictured in Razorback 1954, University of Arkansas yearbook

Chancellor of North Carolina State University
- In office 1959–1975
- Preceded by: Carey Hoyt Bostian
- Succeeded by: Jackson A. Rigney

President of the University of Arkansas
- In office 1952–1959

Personal details
- Born: December 9, 1911 Yazoo City, Mississippi, U.S.
- Died: October 13, 1995 (aged 83) Raleigh, North Carolina, U.S.
- Education: Mississippi State College (BS); Duke University (MA); Princeton University (PhD)
- Profession: Educator

John Tyler Caldwell (December 19, 1911 – October 13, 1995) was an American educator who presided over three universities, including North Carolina State University.

== Early life ==
John Tyler Caldwell was born on December 19, 1911, in Yazoo City, Mississippi. He received a B.S. from Mississippi State College in 1932, an M.A. from Duke University in 1936, and a Ph.D. in political science from Princeton University in 1939 as a Julius Rosenwald Fellow.

== Career ==
He was a professor of political science at Holmes Junior College from 1932 to 1936 and was a professor at Vanderbilt University from 1939 to 1947. Meanwhile, Caldwell also entered the US Navy as an ensign in 1942 to serve in World War II and was awarded a Bronze Star for his service in the Battle of Okinawa. He left the Navy in 1946 as a lieutenant commander.

Caldwell was named president of the University of Montevallo in Alabama in 1947. After leaving Montevallo in 1951, he served as president of the University of Arkansas. Here, he supervised the development and expansion of the University's Graduate school and saw the beginning of the process of racial integration.

In 1959, Caldwell was named the eighth chancellor of North Carolina State University. During his tenure, the university established the School of Physical Sciences and Applied Mathematics and the School of Liberal Arts. After his retirement from the office in 1975 Caldwell continued to teach in the Department of Political Science.

Caldwell was an Eagle Scout, recipient of the Distinguished Eagle Scout Award, and worked with Scouting much of his life.

== Death and legacy ==
Caldwell died in Raleigh, North Carolina, at the age of 83. The NC State Alumni Association established the John T. Caldwell Alumni Scholarship Program (later called the Caldwell Fellows) in 1977 to recruit outstanding high school seniors to NC State.

NCSU Libraries Special Collections Research Center serves as the repository for John Tyler Caldwell's manuscript papers and University Archives. Caldwell Hall at NCSU was also named after him. Additionally, the North Carolina Humanities Council named its highest honor after Caldwell.
