= Albert Lyman Cox =

American politician

Albert Cox
- Born: December 1, 1883; Raleigh, North Carolina, US
- Died: April 15, 1965 (aged 81); Goldsboro, North Carolina, US
- Occupation: Attorney
- Football career

Profile
- Position: End

Career information
- College: North Carolina (1900–1903)

Awards and highlights
- All-Southern (1902)

Albert Lyman Cox (December 1, 1883 – April 15, 1965) was an American attorney, state legislator, state judge, and U.S. Army major general.

== Early life ==
Albert Lyman Cox was born on December 1, 1883, in Raleigh, North Carolina. His father was Confederate general, judge, and U.S. congressman William Ruffin Cox, son of state senator Thomas Cox of Washington County and grandson of English-born Thomas Cox, a seafaring man, and of Margaret Cheshire Cox of Edenton. His mother Fannie Augusta Lyman Cox was the daughter of Right Reverend Theodore Benedict Lyman, Episcopal Bishop of North Carolina from 1881 to 1893. He attended Horner Military Academy and the University of North Carolina.

== College athletics ==
Cox was an All-Southern college football end for the North Carolina Tar Heels of the University of North Carolina. He was also a member of the baseball and track teams. At UNC, he was a member of Sigma Alpha Epsilon. He earned a law degree at Harvard University.

== First World War ==
He was the first commander of the 113th Field Artillery Regiment during the First World War.

== Political career ==
In 1909, Cox served in the North Carolina House of Representatives and was a Democrat. In 1916, Cox was appointed North Carolina state superior judge.

== Later life ==
Cox moved to Washington in 1932, and became the director of the Potomac Electric Power Company. He became the commanding general of the District of Columbia National Guard after May 17, 1938, until his retirement on November 6, 1949.

== Personal ==
In November 1909, Cox married Miss Arabel Parker Nash of Tarboro.
