= Marye Anne Fox =

American academic administrator (1947–2021)

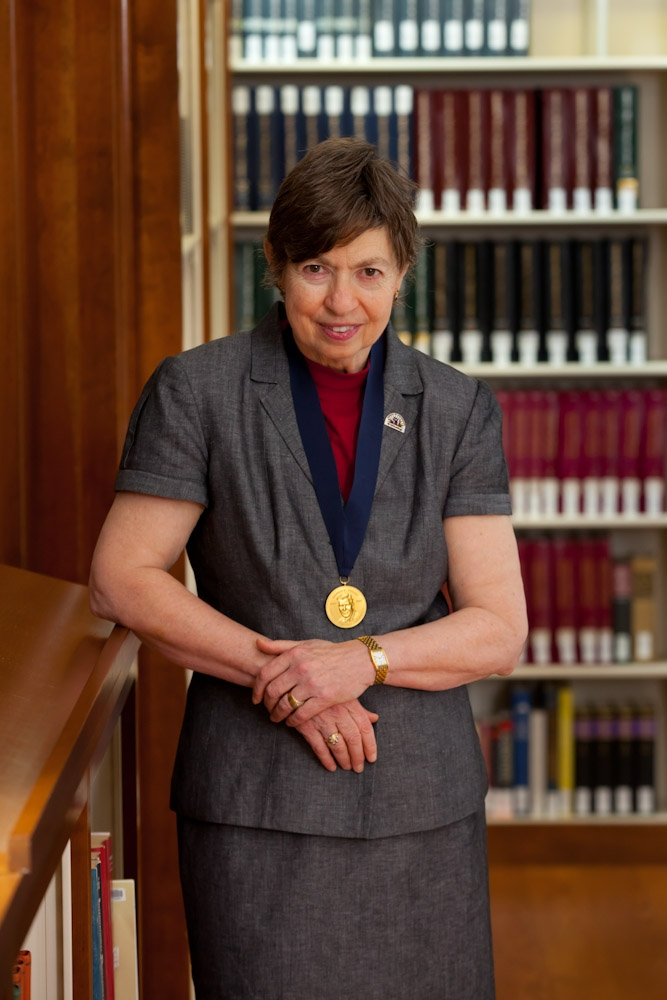
- Fox in 2012

7th Chancellor of the University of California San Diego
- In office 2004–2012
- Preceded by: Robert C. Dynes
- Succeeded by: Pradeep Khosla

12th Chancellor of North Carolina State University
- In office August 1998 – June 2004
- Preceded by: Larry K. Monteith
- Succeeded by: Robert A. Barnhardt

Personal details
- Born: 9 December 1947 Canton, Ohio, U.S.
- Died: 9 May 2021 (aged 73) Austin, Texas, U.S.
- Spouse: James K. Whitesell
- Education: Notre Dame College; Cleveland State University; Dartmouth College
- Profession: Chemist, administrator
- Scientific career
- Fields: Chemistry
- Workplaces: University of Texas at Austin; North Carolina State University; University of Notre Dame; University of California, San Diego
- Thesis: Photorearrangements of aryl halides (1974)
- Doctoral advisor: David M. Lemal

Marye Anne Payne Fox (9 December 1947 – 9 May 2021) was an American physical organic chemist and university administrator. She was the first female chief executive of North Carolina State University in Raleigh, North Carolina. In April 2004, Fox was named chancellor of the University of California, San Diego. In 2010 Fox received the National Medal of Science.

== Biography ==
=== Early years ===
Fox was born in Canton, Ohio, and received her B.S. from Notre Dame College and her PhD from Dartmouth College, both in chemistry. She held a postdoctoral appointment at the University of Maryland from 1974 to 1976. In the later year, she joined the faculty of the University of Texas at Austin, and in 1994 she became vice president of research there.

=== Career ===
A member of the National Academy of Sciences, Fox served as president of the scientific research society Sigma Xi. She earned a B.S. in chemistry from Notre Dame College in 1969 and a PhD from Dartmouth College in 1974. In 1976 she joined the faculty of the University of Texas at Austin, where she rose to direct the Center for Fast Kinetics Research and, in 1994, was appointed the university's vice president for research. Even as a university administrator, she maintained an active research program in the fields of organic photochemistry and electrochemistry. In 1985, Fox was the first woman to give a plenary lecture at the National Organic Symposium.

She was appointed the twelfth chancellor of North Carolina State University in Raleigh, North Carolina, in August 1998, succeeding Dr. Larry K. Monteith. She was the university's first female chief executive, serving until July 2004. During her tenure as Chancellor, the UNC system and its board of governors successfully campaigned for a taxpayer-funded bond referendum leading to a significant period of growth of the physical facilities of the campus, particularly Centennial Campus. Her tenure was also marked by controversy over excessive pay raises for members of her administration and the firing of two prominent vice provosts that led to the resignation of the provost and a formal censuring by the NC State Faculty Senate.

In June 2003, Fox played a role in the expansion of the Atlantic Coast Conference. Reached in Switzerland at a conference, she cast an unexpected and deciding "no" vote against Boston College in the first round of Atlantic Coast Conference expansion. Her unanticipated vote at the 11th hour resulted in months of turmoil in college sports. Miami President Donna Shalala delayed her university's acceptance of the ACC invitation to the last possible day explaining "We had numbers on Boston College-Virginia Tech. We had done numbers on Miami alone. But we had not anticipated that Virginia Tech and Miami would be the only two invitees." The ensuing delay forced the ACC to spend the 2004–5 academic year as an 11-team conference, one shy of the dozen required by the NCAA for the ACC to hold a lucrative championship football game, and resulted in Boston College playing a "lame duck" year in the Big East. Media reports suggested Chancellor Fox, a University of Notre Dame trustee, may have cast her vote against Boston College to provide time for the ACC to consider extending membership to the Fighting Irish.

In 2004, Fox accepted the position of Chancellor at the University of California, San Diego. In the same year, and in spite of the faculty's censure vote, the NCSU Board of Trustees named a building after her, the Marye Anne Fox Science Teaching Laboratory. On 5 July 2011, she announced her intention to resign as Chancellor, effective June 2012, and return to her research and teaching.

Fox served as a science advisor to George W. Bush during his tenure as governor of Texas. She also served on President Bush's Council of Advisors on Science and Technology and was on the short list of candidates to head the White House Office of Science and Technology Policy in Bush's presidential administration.

Fox served as a trustee on the Board of Trustees of Dartmouth College from 2011 to 2013.

=== Personal life ===
Fox was married to chemistry professor James K. Whitesell, with whom she had five sons from their previous marriages.

Fox died at her home on May 9, 2021 after a long illness.

== Awards and honors ==
- Agnes Fay Morgan Research Award (1984), Iota Sigma Pi
- Garvan-Olin Medal (1988)
- Havinga Medal (1991), first woman recipient
- Myron L. Bender and Muriel S. Bender Summer Lectureship, Northwestern University (1994)
- Elected to the American Academy of Arts and Sciences
- Elected to the American Philosophical Society
- Charles Lathrop Parsons Award, American Chemical Society, (2005)
- National Medal of Science (2010)
- Othmer Gold Medal (2012)
- Revelle Medal (2018)

Academic offices
Preceded by Larry K. Monteith	12th Chancellor of North Carolina State University; 1998–2004	Succeeded by Robert A. Barnhardt
Preceded by Robert C. Dynes	7th Chancellor of the University of California San Diego; 2004–2012	Succeeded by Pradeep Khosla
