= John Widman =

American luthier

John Widman is an American luthier who makes high-end, hand-built guitars.

He grew up in the Asheville, North Carolina area. After graduating from North Carolina State University (1984) and working as a photographer and graphic designer, he turned to building high-end electric guitars under the name Widman Custom Electrics, from Arden, North Carolina. Woods and hardware are specified by the customer. Besides vintage-styled guitars, he also builds electric banjos.
