= Larry K. Monteith =

American academic administrator (1933–2023)

Larry King Monteith (August 17, 1933 – November 2, 2023) was an American electrical engineer and academic leader in North Carolina. He retired from North Carolina State University following a distinguished career of leadership positions, culminating with service as the university's eleventh chancellor from 1989 to 1998.

In 1960, Monteith graduated from North Carolina State University with a B.S. in electrical engineering. He later earned a M.S. and Ph.D. from Duke University, also in electrical engineering.

After serving as a research scientist at the Solid State Laboratory of the Research Triangle Institute, Monteith joined the faculty of the NC State Department of Electrical Engineering in 1968. He was later appointed Department Head (1974) and Dean of Engineering (1978). As dean, Monteith led the engineering faculty to a top 30 ranking among all engineering schools in the nation and to a major increase in members of the National Academy of Engineering. Following the resignation of then-chancellor Bruce Poulton in 1989, Monteith was named interim chancellor, a position that he was thereafter named to on a permanent basis. He inherited an intercollegiate sports program in turmoil that had been recently penalized by the NCAA. By the time he completed his service as chancellor, the program was stable and graduation rates of student-athletes had increased dramatically. In spite of difficult statewide budgetary conditions throughout his chancellorship, Monteith presided over a strong period of growth and advancement at NC State. The university's research campus, the 1,000-acre (4.0 km^{2}) Centennial Campus, grew from a single building housing the university's College of Textiles to a multi-tenant campus housing academic, corporate, and government researchers. Plans were developed then for a public golf course and executive center, as well as a new alumni building. Under Monteith's leadership, the office of the provost (chief academic officer) underwent major changes, resulting in significant new responsibilities and power. Academic honor programs were also enhanced, with the addition of a First Year College, a chapter of the Phi Beta Kappa honor society, and the Park Scholarship program, a prestigious full-expense merit scholarship, similar to the Morehead Scholarship at sister institution UNC Chapel Hill. He led the transformation of the university library, dramatically improving its ranking among research libraries from next to last place to 32nd the year he left. In addition, the College of Management was established during his tenure and NC State also became the first Atlantic Coast Conference member to become accredited by the NCAA.

On his retirement, Monteith was succeeded as chancellor of NC State by Marye Anne Fox. The Engineering Graduate Research Center on Centennial Campus was renamed Monteith Research Center in his honor by the NC State Board of Trustees.

NC State Libraries Special Collections Research Center currently houses Larry King Monteith's manuscript collection.

Monteith died on November 2, 2023, at the age of 90.
