= Steven Kuehl =

American marine geologist

Steven Kuehl (born 1957) is an American professor of marine geology who graduated from Lafayette College in 1979 with a BSc degree; he earned his master's degree from North Carolina State University in 1982, followed by a Ph.D. from the same place three years later. The majority of his works are published in Geology journal but some is published elsewhere.
