= Carey Hoyt Bostian =

American educator (1907–2000)

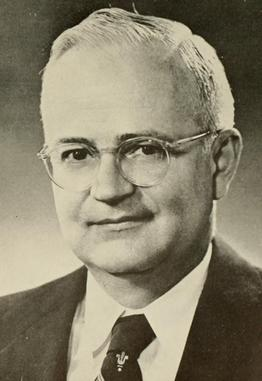
- Bostian pictured in The Agromeck 1954, North Carolina State yearbook

Chancellor of North Carolina State University
- In office 1953–1959
- Preceded by: John W. Harrelson
- Succeeded by: John Tyler Caldwell

Personal details
- Born: March 1, 1907 China Grove, North Carolina
- Died: April 22, 2000 (aged 93) Chapel Hill, North Carolina
- Profession: Educator

Carey Hoyt Bostian (March 1, 1907 – April 22, 2000) was an American educator. He was educated at Catawba College, where he earned a Bachelor's Degree in 1928, and at the University of Pittsburgh where he earned a Master's Degree in 1930 and a Ph.D. in 1933.

After teaching at Catawaba, Bostian joined the North Carolina State University faculty in 1930, where he taught zoology. In 1948 he was appointed associate dean of the School of Agriculture at N.C. State. He was then named director of instruction in 1950 and professor of genetics and director of instruction in 1952.

Bostian was appointed chancellor of N.C. State in 1953. During his chancellorship, enrollment at the university surpassed 5,000 students for the first time. The campus also expanded with an additional 10 buildings. He resigned from the office in 1959 and returned to teaching until his retirement in 1973. He also lobbied Gov. Luther Hodges to proceed with the creation of Research Triangle Park, which is just outside of Raleigh.

Bostian died in Chapel Hill, North Carolina in 2000. NCSU's Bostian Hall is named in his memory.

NCSU Libraries Special Collections Research Center serves as the repository for Carey Hoyt Bostian's manuscript papers and university archives.
