= Eugene C. Brooks =

American educator

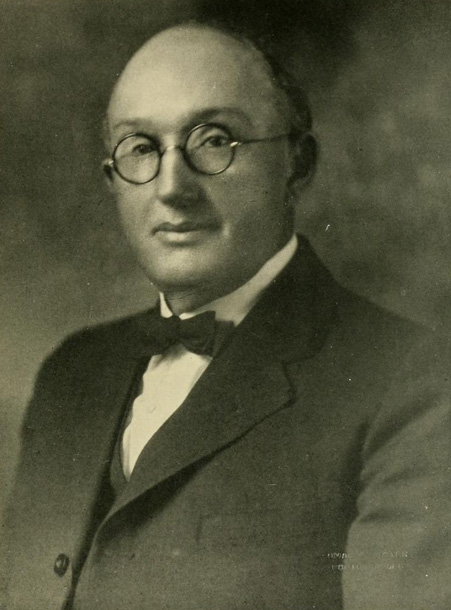
- Brooks pictured in The Agromeck 1924, North Carolina State yearbook

President of the North Carolina State University
- In office 1923–1934
- Preceded by: Wallace Carl Riddick
- Succeeded by: John W. Harrelson

Personal details
- Born: December 3, 1871 Greene County, North Carolina
- Died: October 18, 1947 (aged 76) Raleigh, North Carolina
- Profession: Educator

Eugene Clyde Brooks (December 3, 1871 – October 18, 1947) was an American educator. He was educated at Trinity College (now Duke University), where he earned an A.B. degree in 1894. He also earned a Litt.D. degree from Davidson College in 1918.

Brooks was an educator by trade and spent much of his early professional life working in the North Carolina school system as a teacher, principal, and superintendent. From 1906-1923 he worked as the editor of North Carolina Educator, an education journal of which he was the founder. He was named head of the Department of Education at Trinity College in 1907, where he served until 1919 when he was appointed state superintendent of public instruction by Governor Thomas Walter Bickett. He was elected to the office in the 1920 general election.

Brooks resigned from the office in 1923 to become president of North Carolina State College of Agriculture and Engineering (now North Carolina State University). During his tenure, NC State developed new programs including the School of Agriculture, the School of Education, the School of Science and Business, the School of Textiles, and the School of Engineering. Brooks retired from the presidency in 1934, and Brooks Hall was named in his honor.

He died in Raleigh, North Carolina in 1947. In 1948 he was posthumously elected to the North Carolina Educational Hall of Fame.
