= Jackson A. Rigney =

Dr. Jackson Ashcroft Rigney (born 1913 in La Mesa, New Mexico), was educated at New Mexico A&M College where he earned a B.S. in 1934. He earned an M.S. from Iowa State College in 1936.

In 1938 he was granted an assistant professorship in agronomy at North Carolina State University. He was appointed head of the Department of Experimental Statistics at the university in 1949, director of the agricultural mission to Peru in 1949, and dean for international programs in 1968. He served as interim chancellor of NCSU from July 1975 until the end of the year. He was then named as assistant to the chancellor for international programs, where he remained until his retirement in 1981.

In 1961 he was elected as a Fellow of the American Statistical Association. Rigney also received the International Service Award.

Rigney died in Raleigh, North Carolina in 1998.
