= Robert A. Barnhardt =

American academic administrator

Robert A. Barnhardt was born in West Pittston, Pennsylvania on September 21, 1937. He was educated at the Philadelphia College of Textiles and Science where he earned a B.S. in textile engineering in 1959. He later served as the college's chairman of the Department of Textiles. He earned a M.S. from the Institute of Textile Technology (ITT), located in Charlottesville, Virginia, in 1961. Barnhardt also received a masters of education degree and a doctorate in education administration from the University of Virginia in 1970 and 1974 respectively.

Barnhardt was appointed dean and director of education at ITT in 1966. He also served as the school's executive vice president and chief operating officer before he left in 1987 to take over as the dean of the College of Textiles at North Carolina State University.

While at N.C. State, Barnhardt served as interim provost in 2003 and interim chancellor in 2004.
