= Bruce Poulton =

Bruce Poulton (March 7, 1927 – June 19, 2015) was the tenth chancellor of North Carolina State University from 1982 to 1989.

Poulton was born in Yonkers, New York. He was educated at Rutgers University, where he received a Ph.D. in endocrinology in 1956.

In 1971 he was appointed as vice president of the University of Maine, an office he held until becoming chancellor of the consolidated University of New Hampshire in 1975.

In 1982 Poulton left New Hampshire to serve as chancellor of North Carolina State University; he was the school's 10th chief executive. While at N.C. State he obtained land and funding for the university's Centennial Campus. He also developed Centennial Campus's first master plan. He stepped down from the chancellor's position in 1989 and served as director of N.C. State's Literacy Systems Center. The Poulton Innovation Center on Centennial Campus was named in his honor.

Poulton's resignation was marked with controversy as it came just before the release of a six-month investigation into N.C. State's athletic department. The investigation was triggered by Peter Golenbock's Personal Fouls: The Broken Promises and Shattered Dreams of Big Money Basketball at Jim Valvano's North Carolina State and allegations made therein against the school's basketball program under head coach Jim Valvano. Poulton died in Raleigh, North Carolina on June 19, 2015 at the age of 88.
