= George T. Winston =

American university president (1852–1932)

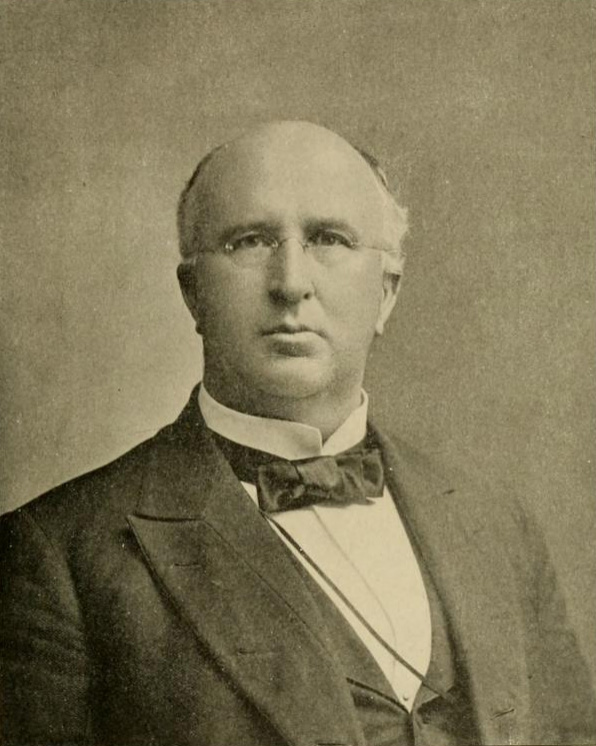
- Winston pictured in The Agromeck 1903, North Carolina State yearbook

President of the University of North Carolina
- In office 1891–1896
- Preceded by: Kemp Plummer Battle
- Succeeded by: Edwin Alderman

President of the University of Texas at Austin
- In office 1896–1899
- Preceded by: Leslie Waggener
- Succeeded by: William Lambdin Prather

President of North Carolina A&M
- In office 1899–1908
- Preceded by: Alexander Q. Holladay
- Succeeded by: Daniel Harvey Hill Jr.

Personal details
- Born: October 12, 1852 Windsor, North Carolina, U.S.
- Died: August 26, 1932 (aged 79) Durham, North Carolina, U.S.
- Spouse: Caroline S. Taylor
- Education: Horner Military Academy; University of North Carolina; United States Naval Academy; Cornell University
- Profession: Educator

George Tayloe Winston (October 12, 1852 – August 26, 1932) was an American educator and university administrator.

During his tenure as president of the North Carolina College of Agriculture and Mechanical Arts, now North Carolina State University, the college developed a new textiles curriculum and began offering summer courses.

Winston Hall on the campus of North Carolina State University and Winston Residence Hall at the University of North Carolina at Chapel Hill are named in his honor. Built in 1910 and renovated in 1988, Winston Hall at NC State currently houses the College of Humanities and Social Sciences. Winston Residence Hall was built in 1947 and is still used as undergraduate student housing.

== Sources ==
- Virtual Museum of UNC History
- University of Texas
- NC State University
