= Free Expression Tunnel =

Graffiti tunnel in Raleigh, North Carolina

Coordinates: 35.7854°N 78.6717°W

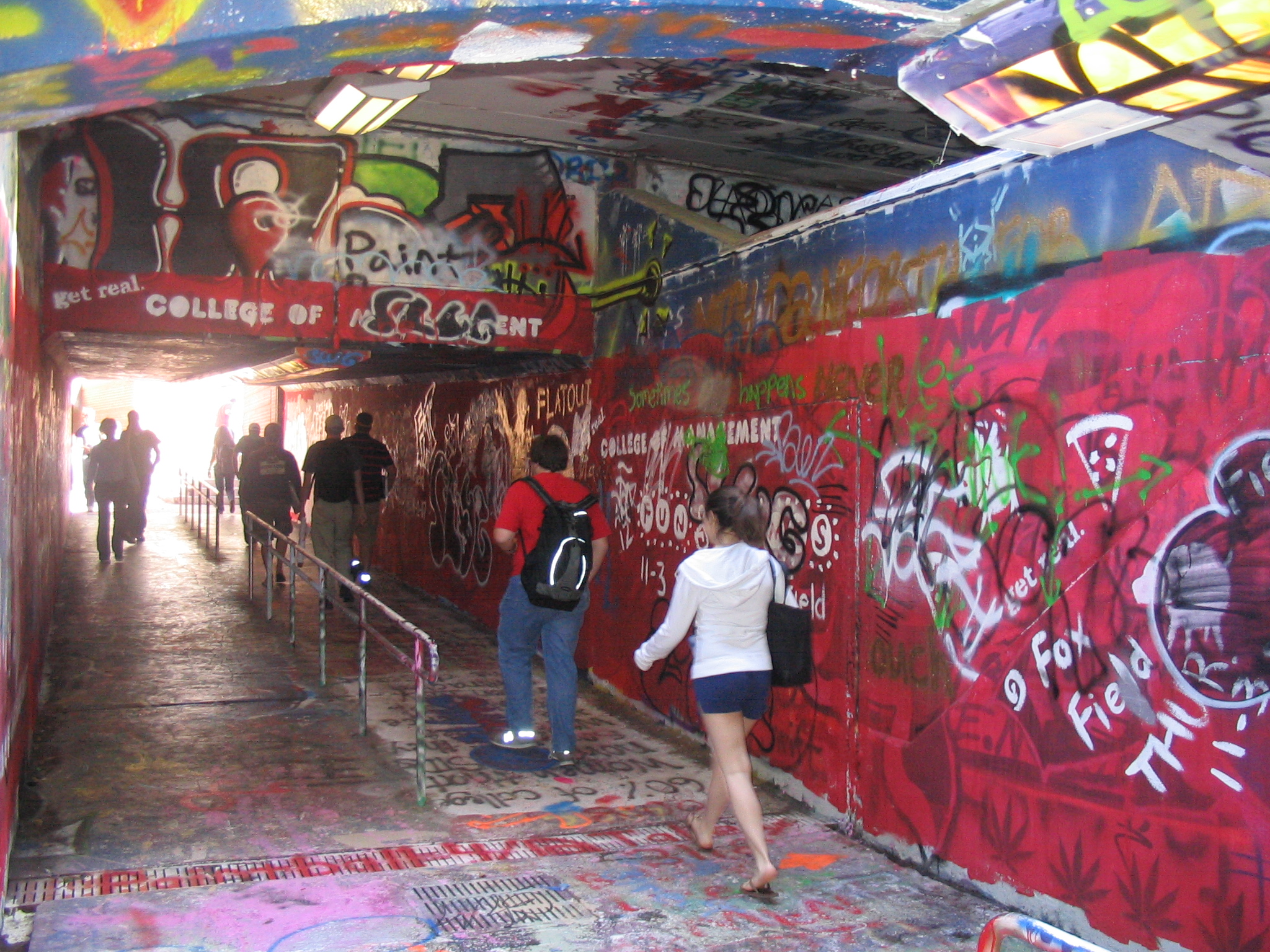
The Free Expression Tunnel on April 12, 2007

The Free Expression Tunnel is the longest, widest, and most heavily used pedestrian tunnel under the railroad tracks at North Carolina State University in Raleigh, North Carolina (also goes under Yarbrough Drive). The special aspect of the tunnel is that anyone is permitted to decorate its walls, ceiling, and floor. The tunnel connects NCSU's North Campus with the Central Campus and provides the most direct route from The Brickyard to the Central Campus residence halls. Clubs, fraternities, sororities, and other organizations often paint the tunnel to promote events and amateur artists paint to express themselves and to promote freedom of speech. A retaining wall just outside the tunnel's south entrance is also open for free expression. The "service tunnel" itself was constructed in 1939 as a Public Works Administration project. The tunnel was first painted in 1968 when it was painted red and white to celebrate the military veterans of North Carolina.

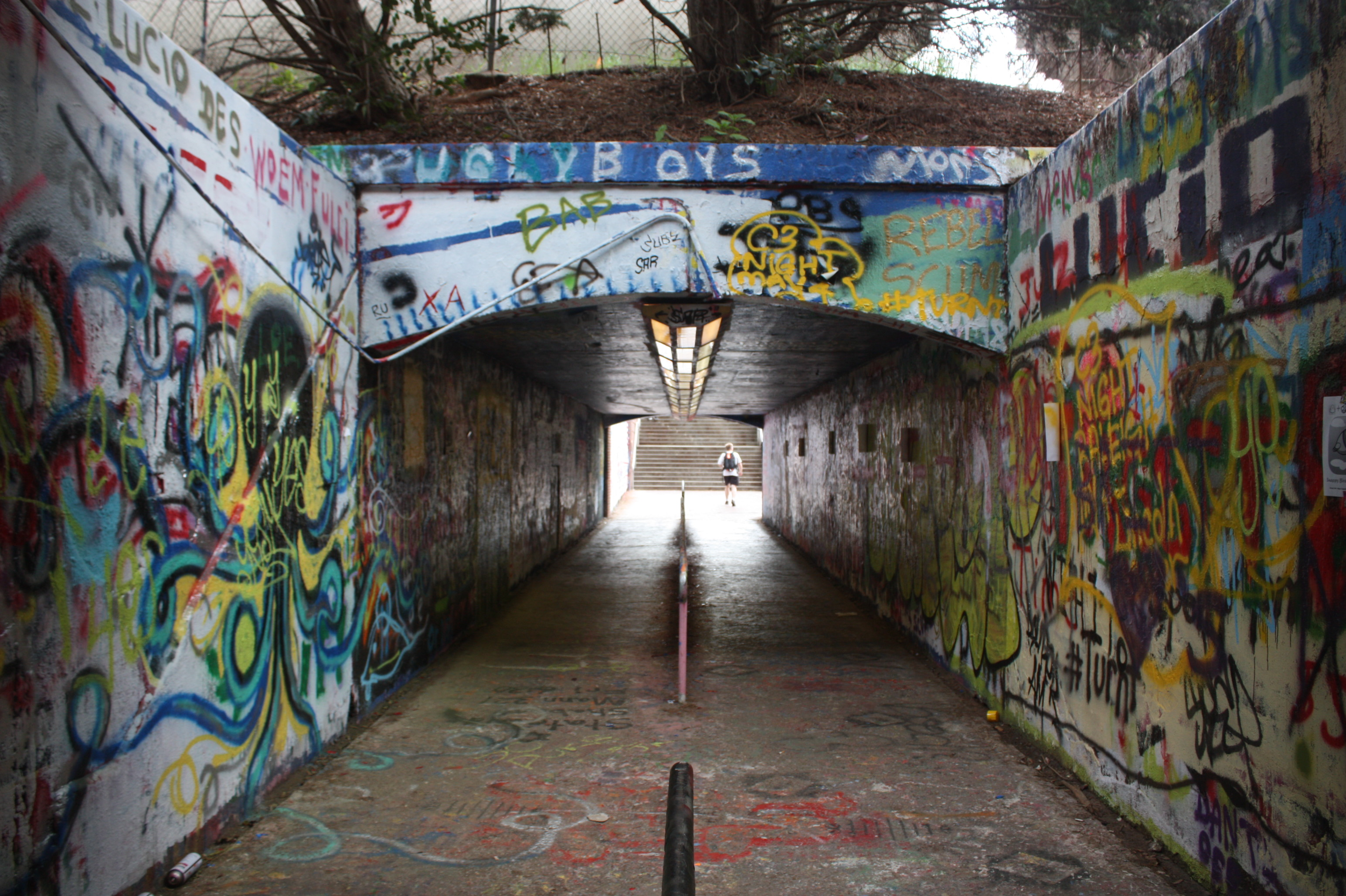
Free Expression Tunnel

Fans of other universities' sports teams often come to the Free Expression Tunnel before and sometimes after big athletic events to paint the tunnel with their teams' athletic colors as part of a prank. Carolina Tar Heel fans have a long history of doing this prank as well as fans from East Carolina University.

The tunnel is subject to flooding during massive torrential rains. Waters rose to a height of 60 inches after a storm in July 2003.

For the Spring 2005-2006 semester, the Free Expression Tunnel was closed for repairs and the installation of handicap ramps. The tunnel reopened in the winter of 2006 with a re-dedication ceremony, which unveiled a new plaque at the tunnel's north entrance expressing the brief history of the tunnel and its purpose. Prior to the renovations, the space available for free expression was much larger at both ends.

Stencil Clip 0001wmv

On November 5, 2008, racist, threatening graffiti directed at then–President-elect Barack Obama was found in the tunnel. Because of the threats against Obama, the Secret Service was among those called to investigate. The four students responsible were identified, and admitted to the act, stating that it was protected by their First Amendment right to free speech; however the North Carolina chapter of the NAACP has called for their expulsion.

Since February 2010, there has been an ongoing tradition of a weekly freestyle cipher, every Monday night at 10 pm. Local artists and students alike gather at the tunnel to freestyle, beatbox, sing, play instruments, recite poetry, and network.

== See also ==
- Carolina-NC State rivalry
- East Carolina - NC State Rivalry
- North Carolina State University Main Campus
