= Special Collections Research Center =

Special Collections Research Center may refer to:

- Special Collections Research Center (Earl Gregg Swem Library), Earl Gregg Swem Library, College of William & Mary
- Special Collections Research Center, Gelman Library, George Washington University
- Special Collections Research Center, D. H. Hill Library, North Carolina State University
- Special Collections Research Center, Ernest S. Bird Library, Syracuse University
- Special Collections Research Center, Regenstein Library, University of Chicago
