= North Carolina State University reactor program =

Coordinates: 35.78585241745253°N 78.66894524996331°W

Pulstar
- Picture of R-1 reactor while under construction
- Operating institution: North Carolina State University
- Location: Raleigh, North Carolina
- Type: pool
- Power: 1 MW (thermal)

Construction and upkeep
- Construction cost: $1.5 million USD
- Construction began: June 1, 1969
- First criticality: January 1, 1972
- Staff: 7
- Operators: 3

Technical specifications
- Max thermal flux: 1.1e13 n/cm^2-s
- Fuel type: U0_{2} pellets, pin lattice
- Cooling: n/cm^2-s
- Neutron moderator: light water
- Neutron reflector: graphite, beryllium
- Control rods: 4 Rods
- Cladding material: Zirconium Alloy
- Source(s): IAEA Database of Reactors data from 2002-09-04

North Carolina State University in 1950 founded the first university-based reactor program and Nuclear Engineering curriculum in the United States. The program continues in the early 21st century. That year, NC State College administrators approved construction of a reactor and the establishment of a collegiate nuclear engineering program. The first research reactor was completed in 1953; it was scaled up in 1957 and 1960 (referred to as R-1, R-2, and R-3). It was deactivated in 1973 to make way for the PULSTAR reactor. The old reactor has been decommissioned.

The PULSTAR is used for a variety of purposes, including training and research. The reactor is located in Burlington Engineering Laboratories on NCSU's main campus. This facility was built to house the first reactor and then expanded and renamed when the PULSTAR was built. The current reactor is one of two PULSTAR reactors built, and the only one still in operation. The other reactor was a 2 MW reactor at the State University of New York at Buffalo. It went critical in 1964 and was decommissioned in 1994.

== Current reactor operations ==
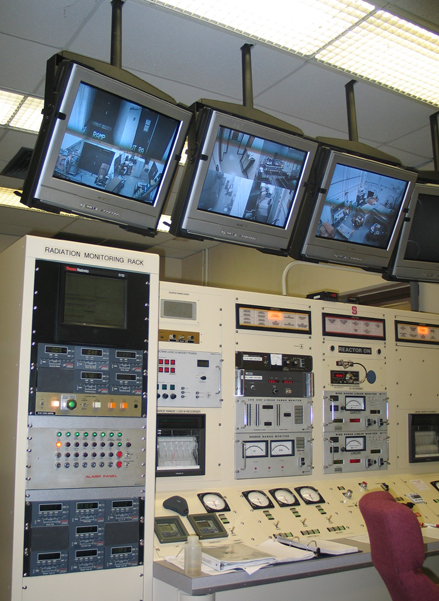
The control room of NC State's Pulstar Nuclear Reactor.

The PULSTAR reactor is situated along Engineering Row in the main campus, surrounded by Mann Hall, 111 Lampe Drive, Polk Hall, and a park. The reactor has a dedicated building and uses one cooling tower; it releases water vapor when the reactor is at high power. This building is not a Containment building, but it maintains a negative pressure to prevent any release of radioactive material. The reactor can be operated up to a power of 100 kW on natural circulation, or 1 Megawatt (MW) with the use of pumps.

The reactor enriches the department curricula by providing hands on experience as well as training for students. In 2002, department enrollment was 72 total undergraduate students, 15 masters students, and 22 PhD students, all of whom use the reactor. Additionally, 34 researches outside of Nuclear Engineering use the reactor and associated facilities.

The primary research purpose of the reactor is to provide a neutron source for activities such as Neutron activation analysis. For example, cobalt-60 irradiators are used by a number of departments to sterilize biological samples. It is also used for professional training for nuclear utility operators and engineers, DOE Interns, and State and local radiation protection personnel.

This reactor is well suited for duplicating the fuel performance of power reactors. The core consists of low-enriched Uranium pins intended to be very similar to what is used in commercial nuclear power plants. Five beam ports are adjacent to the core of the reactor. This reactor is well suited for experiments requiring a large neutron flux because peaking occurs around the edge of the core due to under moderation. In September 2007, students, faculty and staff produced the most intense operating positron beam anywhere in the world.

The PULSTAR reactor is a public facility and gives frequent tours with advance notice and clearance.

In November 2010, the PULSTAR reactor was linked to the nuclear engineering department of Jordan University of Science and Technology (JUST).

=== Incidents ===
A water leak was detected in the pool, and the reactor was subsequently shut down on July 2, 2011. The leak rate was said to be 10 US gallons per hour (11 L/ks) (out of a 15,600-US-gallon-pool (59,000 L)), which is far below the 350 US gallons per hour (370 L/ks) that is mandated to be officially reported to the regulator. The leak was said to be "pinhole" size and required special equipment to detect. After the leak was located and repaired, technicians returned the reactor to normal operations.

== Early history ==
The first reactor was a part of a 1-story building called Burlington Nuclear Laboratories at the time and currently referred to as the old building of the Burlington Engineering Labs, which has classrooms surrounding the reactor bay. The old building is still in use with the reactor bay housing various new projects. The reactor itself has been completely decommissioned and moved out.

=== R-1 ===
In 1949, Dr. Clifford K. Beck was recruited from the Oak Ridge National Laboratory to join the faculty with plans to make NCSU the first academic institution to operate a nuclear reactor.

The first reactor at an academic institution went critical on September 5, 1953, approximately four years after construction had been started. This reactor was dubbed R-1 because it was the first university research reactor. It was a 10 kW, homogeneous reactor using highly enriched Uranyl Sulfate as fuel. It operated for a short time but was shut down due to corrosion problems that lead to fuel leakage. Howard Blakeslee, science editor of Associated Press Service, called the reactor the First Temple of the Atom because of the public nature of this reactor.

In 1954 construction of Burlington Nuclear Laboratory began with funds from the AEC and Burlington Mills. The purpose of this building was to house the successor to the R-1. Also in 1954 the first two PhDs in Nuclear Engineering were presented.

In 1955, Dr. Raymond L. Murray, another recruit from Oak Ridge National Laboratory, joined the faculty, who later became the longest serving department head.

=== R-3 ===
In 1956 work to build a heterogeneous reactor called R-3 began. This design was to use Materials Test Reactor plate-type fuel in Burlington Nuclear Labs. This reactor operated at a maximum power of 100 kW.

In the late 1950s, Dr. Raymond L. Murray became head of the Applied Physics department where he also provided leadership to the beginning of a nuclear engineering educational program. The decision was made to offer the first B.S. degree in Nuclear Engineering in the nation. In 1956 Clifford Beck departed the program to accept a position with the Atomic Energy Commission in Washington. Raymond Murray and Professor Harold Lammonds assumed supervision of the nuclear program.

Between 1962 and 1964, the shielding of the R-3 reactor was extended to allow operation at higher power levels and this improved reactor began operation in 1963, operating at a steady-state power level of 250 kW. This reactor became a major part of the nuclear engineering instructional program and also began to provide some services in radioisotope production and neutron activation analysis.

In 1963 Raymond Murray resigned his position as head of Applied Physics to become Department Head of Nuclear Engineering. Simultaneous with this decision, the Nuclear Engineering Department was transferred from Applied Physics into the School of Engineering, then headed by Dr. Ralph E. Fadum, Dean.

Through the late 1960s and early 1970s the Air Force and Army began to send qualified students to the program to obtain M.S. degrees and later staff the nuclear programs in their own organizations. In the 70's, the NESEP program (Naval Enlisted Scientific Education Program) brought a number of well qualified enlisted men into the nuclear program to earn undergraduate degrees and a number of foreign countries contributed students to earn BS, MS or PhD degrees and then return to their respective countries.

By the time of shutdown, the reactor had achieved a total of 2 Megawatt-days of operation.

== History after construction of the PULSTAR ==
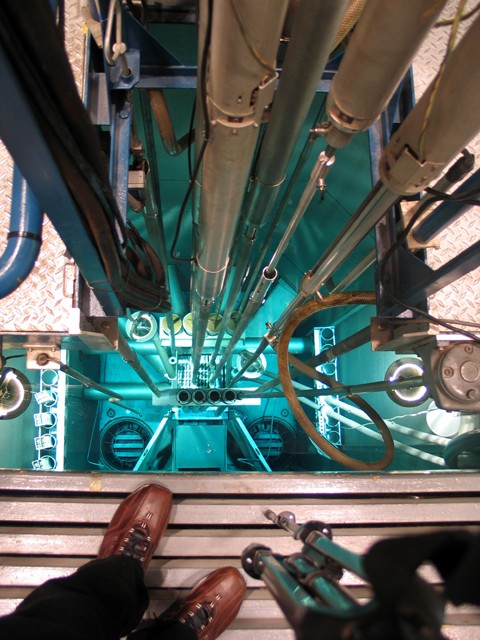
View looking down on the reactor pool

Internal discussions within Nuclear Engineering addressed the choices of upgrading the R-3 reactor for both teaching and research or shutting it down to replace it with an entirely new reactor. Dr. Martin Welt championed the latter point of view, and this position was adopted by the department.

A new 3-story addition to Burlington Labs was constructed (known as the new building). Between it and the old building, a reactor building was constructed, along with a loading dock and walkway that bridged the old and new buildings. The reactor building housed the 1 MW pool nuclear reactor manufactured by AMF and known as the "Pulstar" reactor. It was named for its pulsing ability, by which it can safely become super prompt critical and produce very short pulses of radiation. The reactor became operational August 25, 1972, replacing the previous series. The initial costs were reported to be 1.5 M US$.

In the 1980s a Prompt Gamma facility and a Neutron Radiography facility were added. The prompt gamma facility performs the analysis of elements that emit characteristic signatures immediately on neutron capture. The Neutron Radiography facility provides imaging capabilities to the fundamental difference in the interaction of neutrons with nuclei in comparison to the interaction of x-rays and electrons.

In 1997 the Nuclear Regulatory Commission approved a 20-year license extension.

As of 2025, the PULSTAR operates at up to 1 MWth. The Nuclear Reactor Program intends to upgrade to 2 MWth when regulatory approval is given. Component upgrades for cooling the higher heat load are complete. Operating at 2 MWth effectively doubles the neutron flux available for irradiation, imaging, and research facilities.

== Facilities ==
=== In-Pool Irradiation Facilities ===
The PULSTAR’s heavy fuel load with a high fuel-to-moderator ratio results in high fast neutron leakage at the core boundary. This causes a large thermal neutron “reflector hump” at the core periphery, yielding high thermal neutron fluxes at the experimental ports. Vertical ports (standpipes) can be configured to provide well controlled irradiation conditions.

=== Intense Positron Beam User Facility ===
In 2009, an intense positron beam facility has been established at the North Carolina State University (NCSU) PULSTAR nuclear reactor. Two positron annihilation spectrometers associated to the main beam have been built and tested. The facility provides not only high intensity positron sources, but also a suite of positron characterization capabilities and associated technical support to facilitate easier access to the facility for the users.

=== Neutron Imaging Facility ===
Neutron radiography is a powerful non-destructive imaging technique for the internal evaluation of materials or components. It involves the attenuation of a neutron beam by an object to be radiographed, and registration of the attenuation process (as an image) digitally or on film. Neutron radiography is similar in principle to X-ray radiography, and is complementary in the nature of information supplied. The interactions of X-rays and neutrons with matter are fundamentally different, however, forming the basis of many unique applications using neutrons. While X-rays interact with the electron cloud surrounding the nucleus of an atom, neutrons interact with the nucleus itself. For more information see neutron radiology.

=== Neutron Powder Diffraction Facility ===
Neutron diffraction is complementary to other materials characterization methods, such as X-ray diffraction. Neutron diffraction is usually used in a highly specialized way to provide critical information. It has many advantages over X-ray diffraction. The PULSTAR Neutron Powder Diffraction Facility and Microstructure Analysis Laboratory utilize the capabilities of the double-axis neutron diffraction system installed at beamport #4 of the PULSTAR reactor.

=== Ultra Cold Neutron Source ===
The Ultra Cold Neutron Source (UCNS) uses neutrons produced in the reactor by slowing them down through a chamber of methane and other materials and holds them in a tank of D_{2}O. This addition is essentially a tap of neutrons from a beamport adjacent to the reaction to do this research.
