= Main Campus of North Carolina State University =

University campus in Raleigh, North Carolina, US

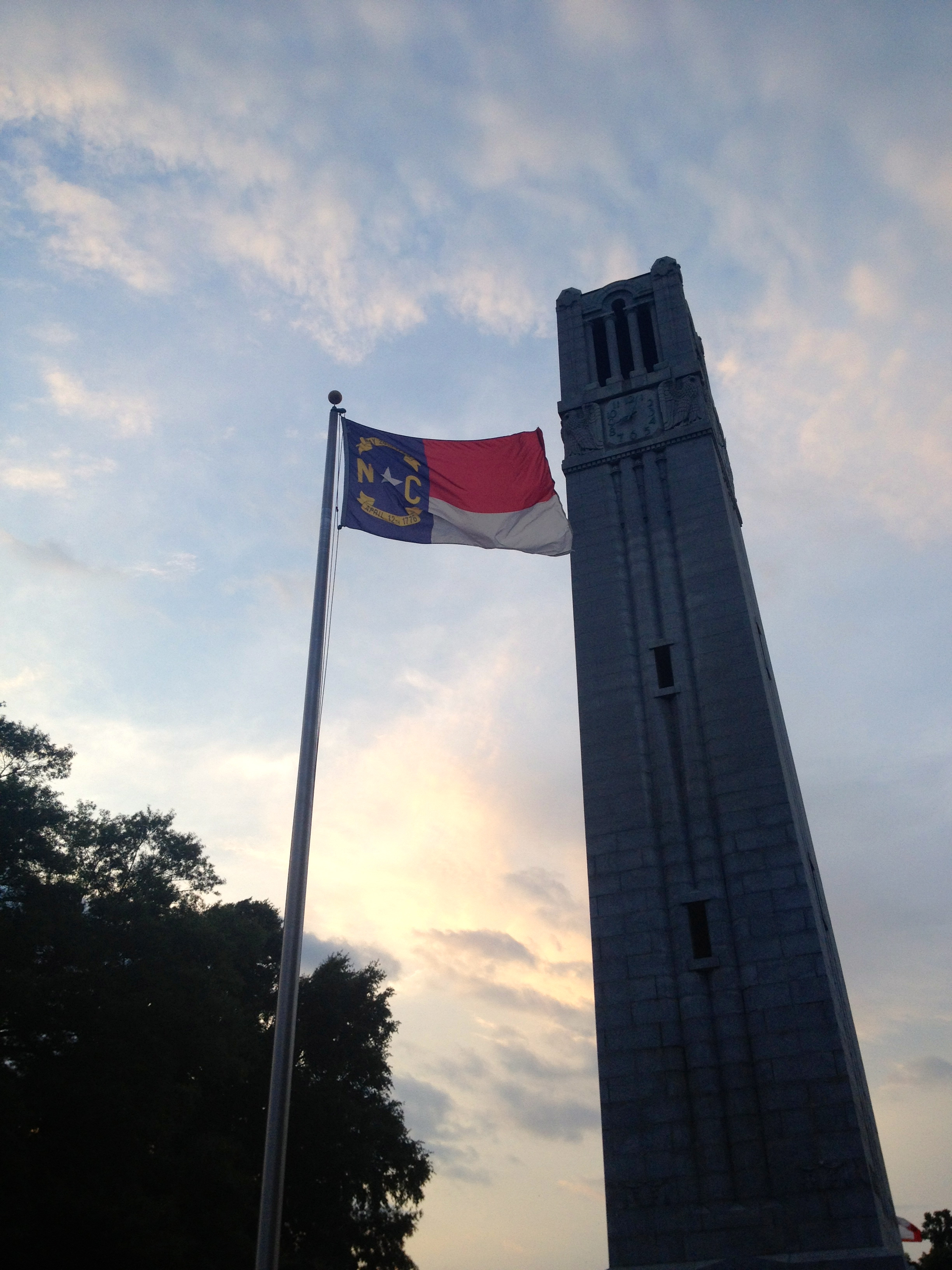
The Memorial Bell Tower is located on Main Campus.

The Main Campus is the primary campus of North Carolina State University, located in Raleigh, North Carolina, US, inside the Beltline. Notable features of Main Campus include the Bell Tower and D. H. Hill Library. The campus is known for its distinctive red brick buildings, sidewalks, plazas, and sculptures; some are dotted with decorative brick mosaics. University Plaza is nicknamed "The Brickyard" because it is mostly a flat, open, bricked area.

The Main Campus is divided into three sections: a North Campus, a Central Campus, and a South Campus. The North and Central campuses are separated by the railroad tracks that run through the area. Pedestrian access between these two campuses is by one of five locations: three pedestrian tunnels, an underpass at Dan Allen Drive, or a bridge at Pullen Road. Of the three pedestrian tunnels, the Free Expression Tunnel is the largest; the other two, nicknamed the Reynolds Tunnel and the Thompson Tunnel, are much more narrow and do not have handicap access ramps.

== North Campus ==
The North Campus consists predominantly of classroom buildings and laboratories. It is the oldest section of the university and is often the busiest of the three campuses during class operational hours.

=== The Brickyard ===
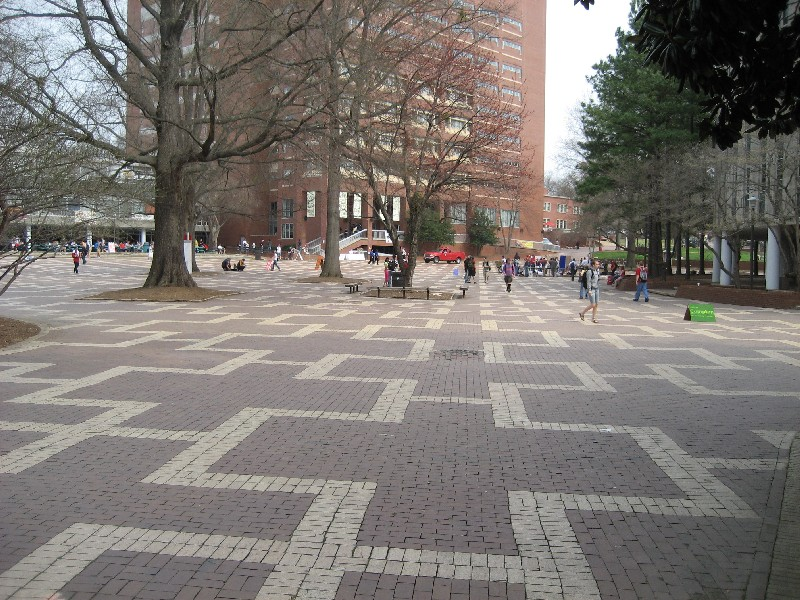
The Brickyard with the D.H. Hill Library tower in the background and Harrelson Hall on the right.

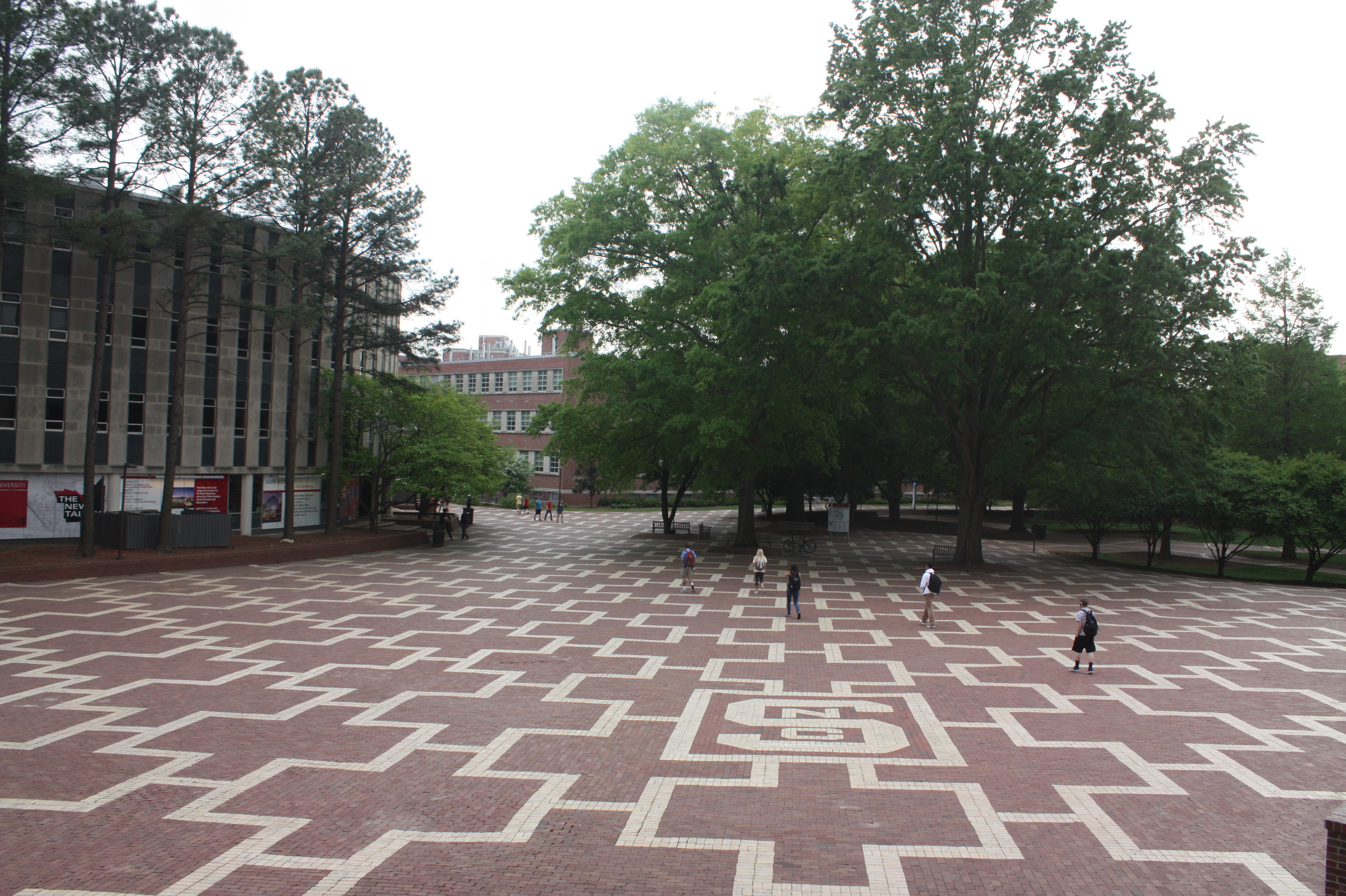
Brickyard

Officially known as University Plaza, "The Brickyard" is the university's largest plaza, situated at the heart of North Campus. The Brickyard is located just south of Hillsborough Street in front of D.H. Hill library. It is a brick-paved courtyard reminiscent of St. Mark's Square in Venice. The brickyard is a popular gathering place for students who are on their way to and from class, eating a snack from the Atrium food court, or just taking a break. Other students decide to steal the bricks and use them as decor for their dorms. Many organizations, demonstrators, and vendors also gather in the brickyard to pass out information about their organizations, to raise funds, or to sponsor various activities.

=== D.H. Hill Library and The Atrium ===
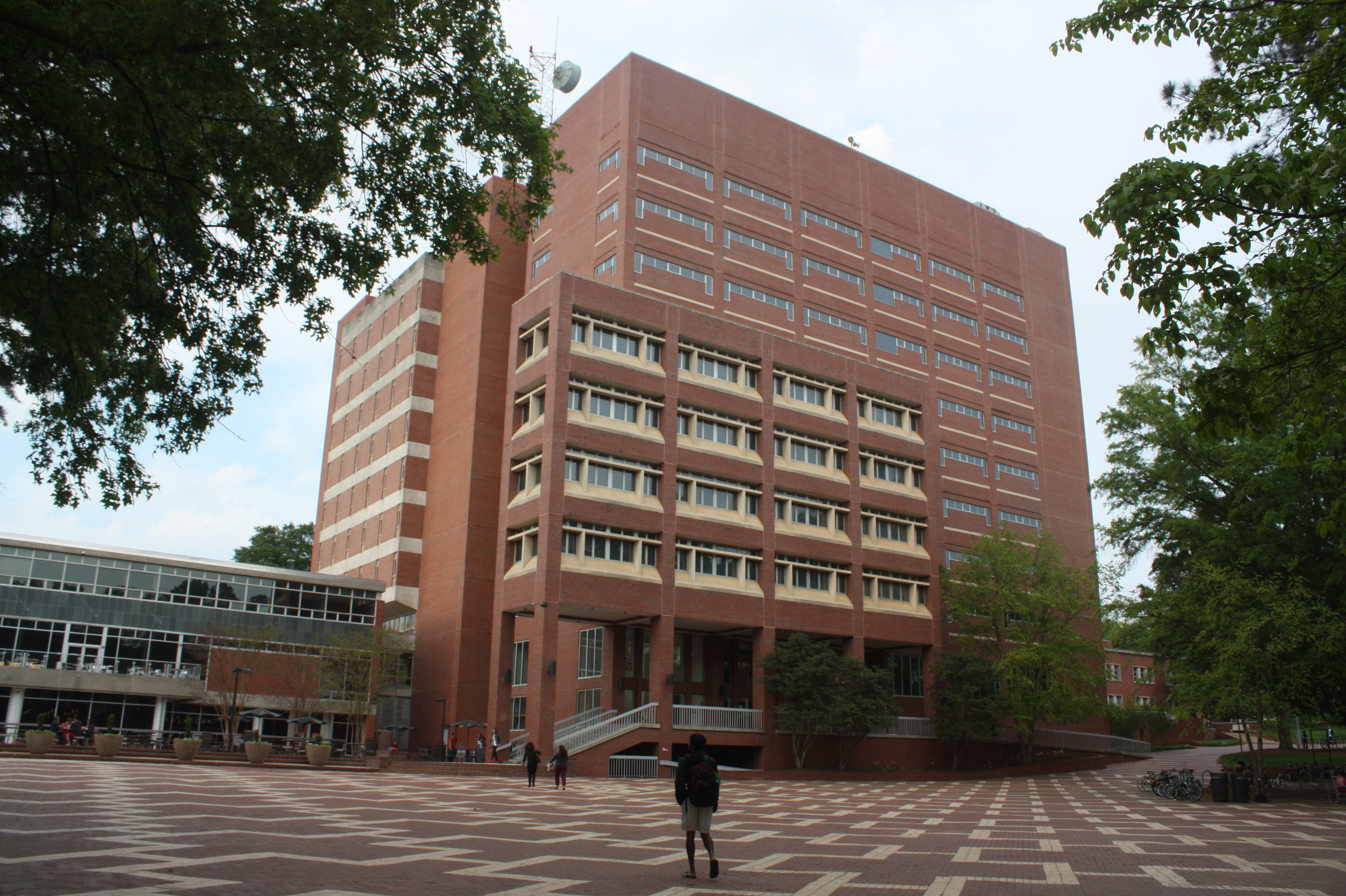
D.H. Hill Library

D.H. Hill Library, the university's main library, and the adjoined Atrium food court are found between Hillsborough Street and the Brickyard. The NCSU Libraries are home to over 4.5 million volumes. NC State's library system is proclaimed to be one of the best research libraries in the nation.

=== Memorial Tower ===
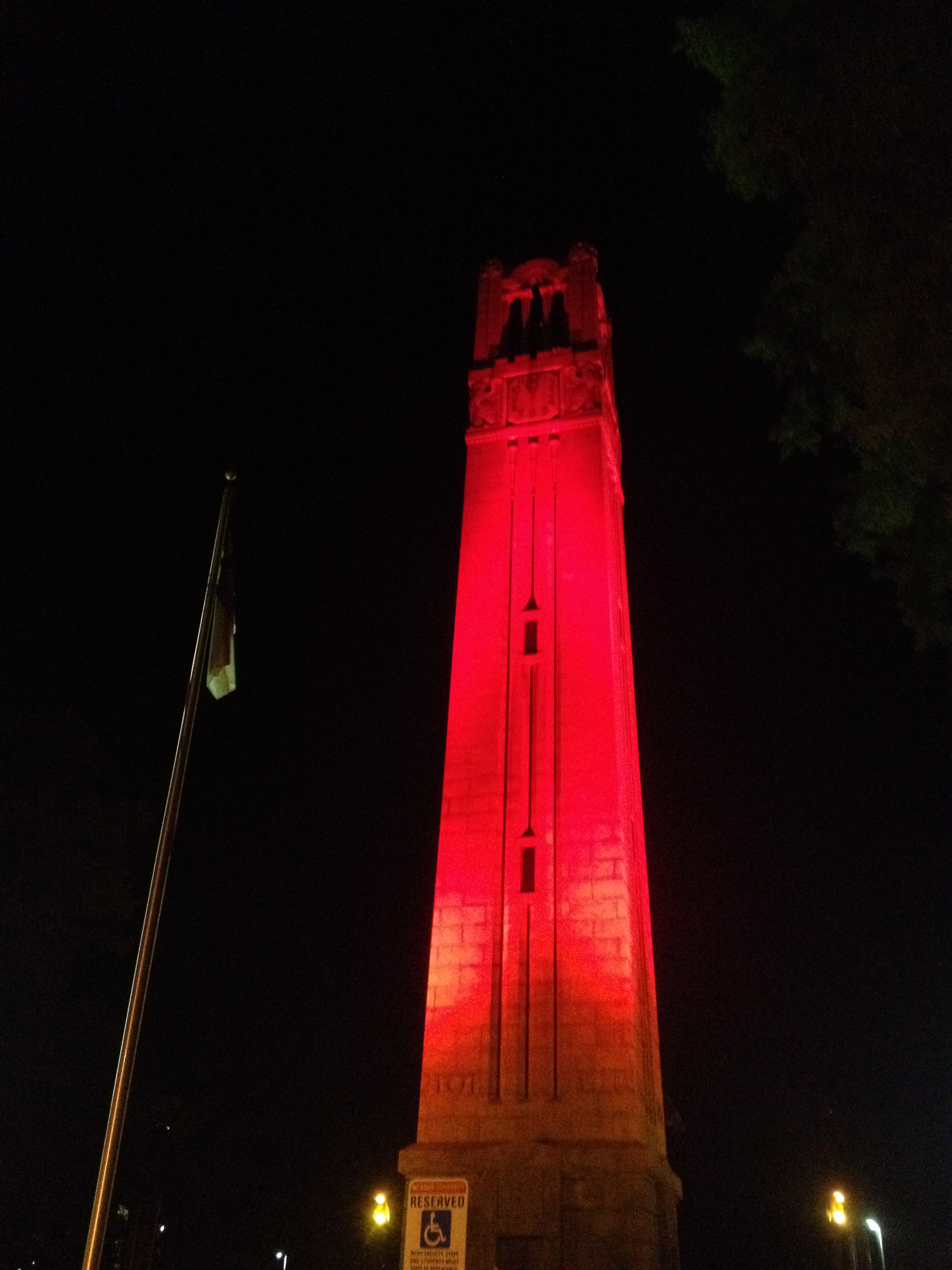
The NCSU Bell Tower becomes lit with red lights after athletic victories and other school successes.

Possibly the university's most notable symbol is the Memorial Tower, which is situated on the northeast corner of North Campus at the intersection of Hillsborough Street and Pullen Road. The bell tower was completed in 1937 and appears on NCSU's official seal. Its blending of Romanesque features and Gothic verticality are reminiscent of the towers of West Point. The 115-foot (35 m) monument, called "a legend in stone" contains 1,400 tons of stone set on a 700-ton concrete base, and exceeded $150,000 in cost. Although 33 alumni died in World War I, the memorial plaque contains 34 names. Before the armistice ended the war, the name G. L. Jeffers, Class of '13, was wrongly reported killed in action. Many years later, however, when the memorial plaque was made, a list was furnished to the manufacturer from which Jeffers' name had never been removed. When the error was noted on the finished plaque, a decision was made to alter the extra name beyond recognition. It was therefore changed to G. E. Jefferson, a symbol of unknown soldiers from State and elsewhere.

The door of the tower presents the words, "And they shall beat their swords into plowshares." This is a reference to a passage in the Book of Isaiah, in which the world is peaceful and weapons are converted to prosperous and useful tools.

The outside inscription on the cornerstone of the tower is marked with the Masonic symbol and uses both the standard notation and year; Anno Domini (Year of our Lord) 1921 and Anno Lumini (Year of Light) 5921, using the Masonic yearly count, where the history of the world begins in 4000 B.C.

The Belltower is lit up with red lights for a variety of special occasions, including athletic victories. The Belltower did not originally have a bell; the electronic carillon system was housed in nearby Holladay Hall. A 54 bell carillon system was part of the bell tower's original plan, but an electronic system was chosen due to financial difficulties during the Great Depression. The most recent electronic bell carillon was installed in 1986 and dedicated in honor of NC State Chancellor Bostian. In the fall of 2019, construction started to restore the tower and install 55 real bells. Five of them were donated by Finish the Belltower, a grassroots campaign led by Matthew Robbins and other then-students. Other bells were fundraised for and cast through the years, but it wasn't until a donation by the Henry family of Gastonia that the collection was completed. Construction was finished, and the first bells rung, in May 2021. On May 14, the university had a dedication ceremony which celebrated the completion of the interior stairs and carillon as well as the surrounding plaza space, now named Henry Square.

The belltower is 115 feet (35 m) tall.

The official name of the structure is the "Memorial Tower," however it is informally referred to as the Belltower.

=== Holladay Hall ===
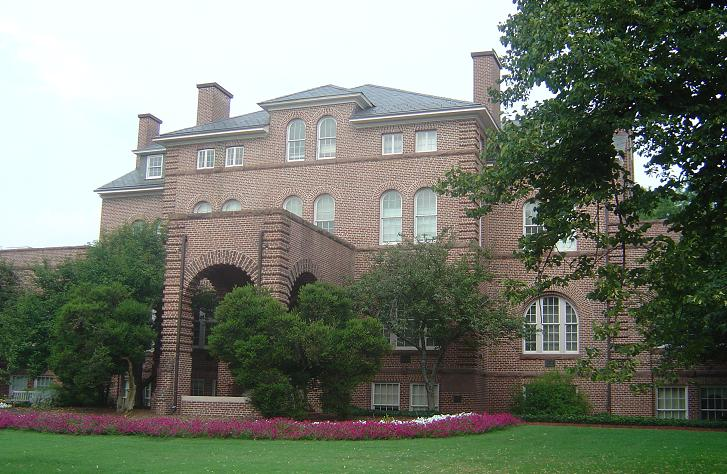
Holladay Hall

Holladay Hall was the first building ever to be constructed at North Carolina State University, but was burned down in 1895 after a gas leak. It was rebuilt and is located just southwest of the Belltower on Pullen Road. Completed in 1889, it was the first building on campus and contained the entire college for the first few years. Prisoners of the state penitentiary built what was then called "Main Building" with bricks donated by the prison. Though it had no electricity or running water, the basement contained laboratories, a kitchen, a dining hall, and a gymnasium. Offices, classrooms, and a library of books donated by professors were located on the first floor. The second and third floor housed 72 students. In 1915, the building was named in honor of Alexander Holladay, NC State's first President. The City Council of Raleigh has designated the building as a historic site. Today, it houses the Chancellor's Office.

=== Court of North Carolina ===
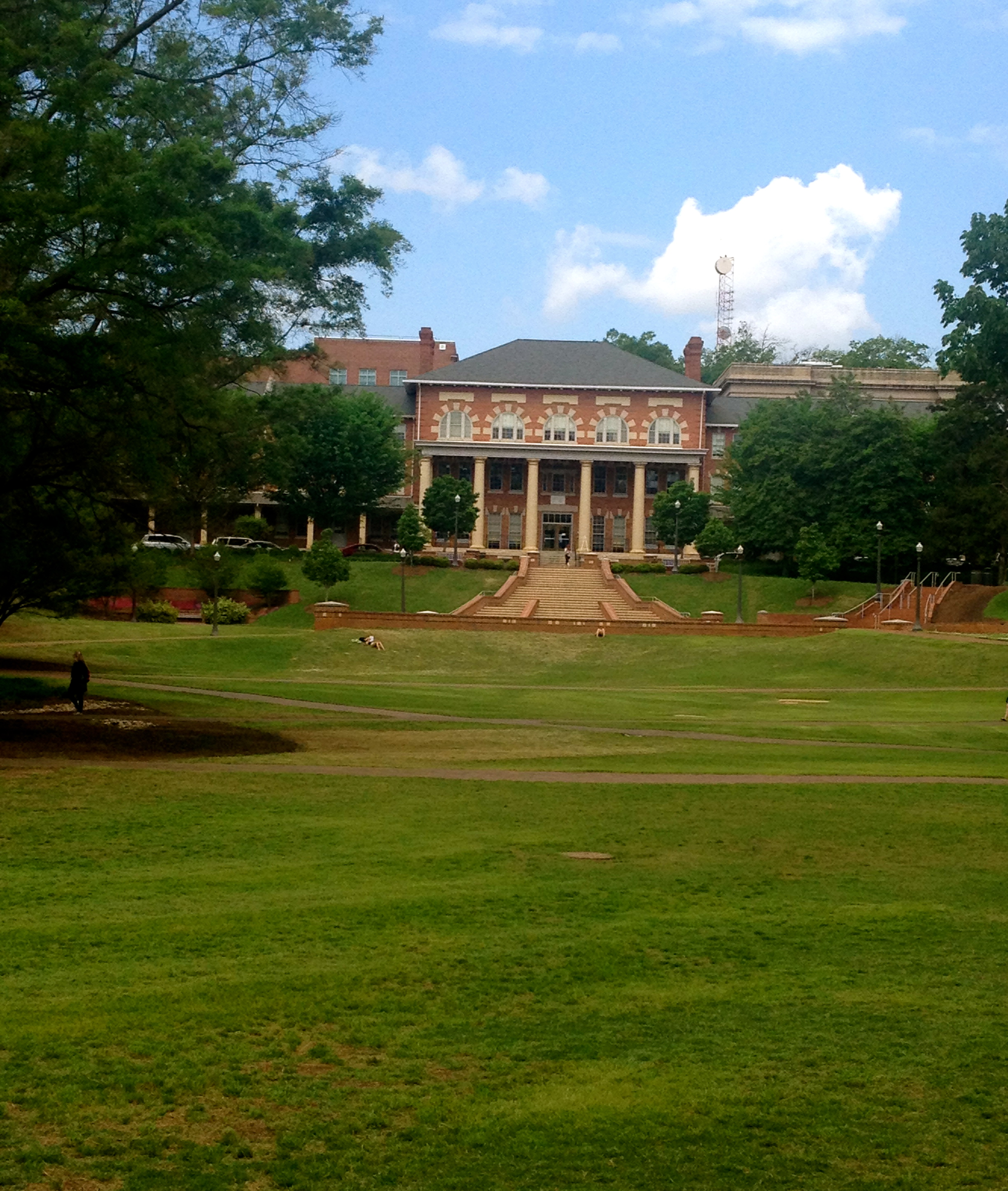
Court of NC

The Court of North Carolina (informally the Court of the Carolinas), located west of the Bell Tower and east of the Brickyard, is a large, mostly green quad on North Campus. It is surrounded by the 1911 Building Hall, Tompkins Hall, Caldwell Hall, Winston Hall, Poe Hall, Page Hall, and Leazar Hall. The west side of the Court is sloped upward along a hill that the 1911 Building is situated upon. It was once home to 100 trees (one for every county in North Carolina; thus the court's name), but damage caused by Hurricane Fran in 1996 reduced the number significantly, including the destruction of a particularly old and large tree which was some 12 feet (3.7 m) in diameter. Some replanting has occurred, but the Court's former appearance is far from being restored. After World War II, NCSU saw an influx of new post-war students as per the G.I. Bill of 1944. To accommodate the need for classrooms, many temporary classroom buildings (Quonset huts) were constructed on the Court of North Carolina.

=== Winston Hall, Caldwell Hall, and Tompkins Hall ===
Winston Hall, Caldwell Hall, and Tompkins Hall are conjoined buildings spanning the Hillsborough St side of the Court of North Carolina. The buildings host the College of Humanities and Social Sciences (CHASS).

== Central Campus ==
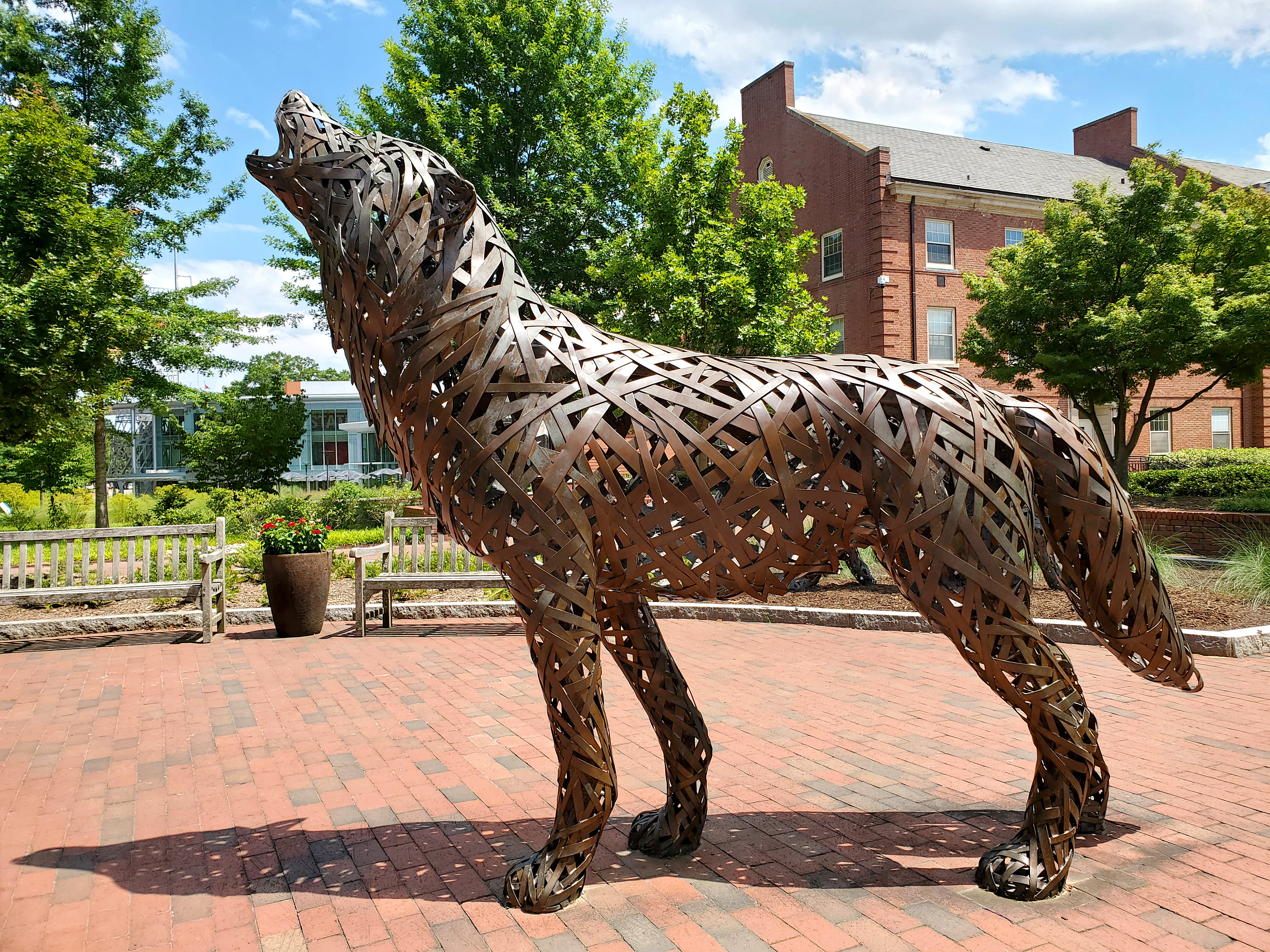
Wolf Plaza, west of the Talley Student Union

Central Campus primarily features residence halls, dining halls, and administration and student affairs buildings. It also contains many athletic venues. Central Campus itself is divided into three sections: East Campus, Central Campus, and West Campus. Dan Allen Drive splits Central and West campuses and Morril Drive and the Talley Student Center roughly split East and Central campuses. Far western Central Campus primarily houses administration, maintenance, and facility operations buildings, though apartments and laboratories are found there.

=== Talley Student Union ===
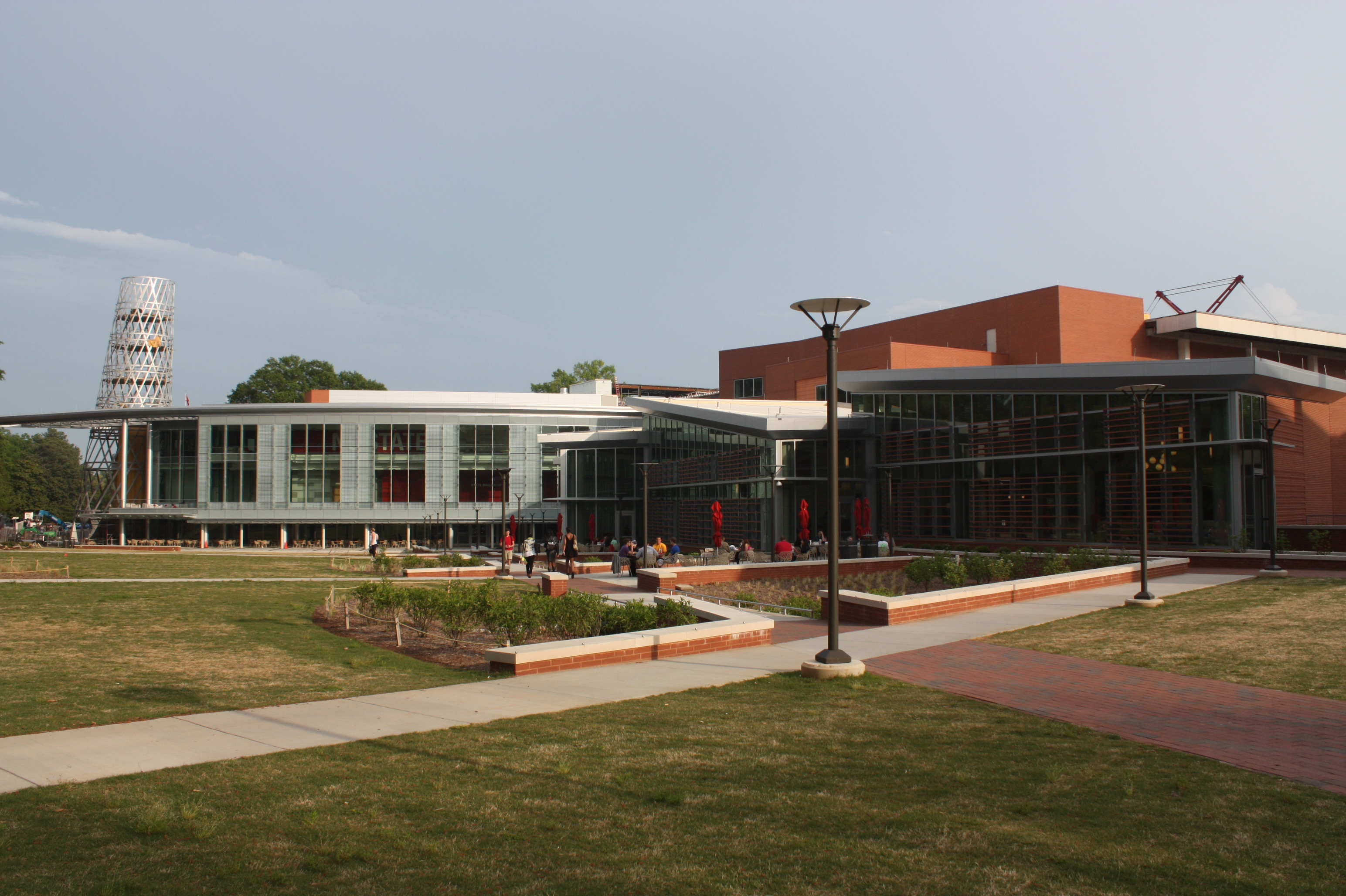
Talley Student Union

Talley Student Union, formerly known as Talley Student Center, is a building on NCSU's Central Campus on Cates Avenue for student and campus affairs. The union, which opened in June 1972 and underwent a complete renovation from 2011 to 2015, is named after former Vice Chancellor of Student Affairs Banks C. Talley, Jr. Banks served in that position from 1969 to 1977. The building houses many organizations, including Student Government, the LGBTQ+ Pride Center, and Fraternity and Sorority Life. The main level of the building features numerous eateries operated by University Dining, including the first Jason's Deli to be located on a college campus. Stewart Theatre, a large arena-style theatre most notably used for orientation and comedy sketch programs, occupies the west end of the Talley Student Center. The building also contains numerous ballrooms, offices, lounges, and the university bookstore. This building also has printers for students, faculty, and staff.

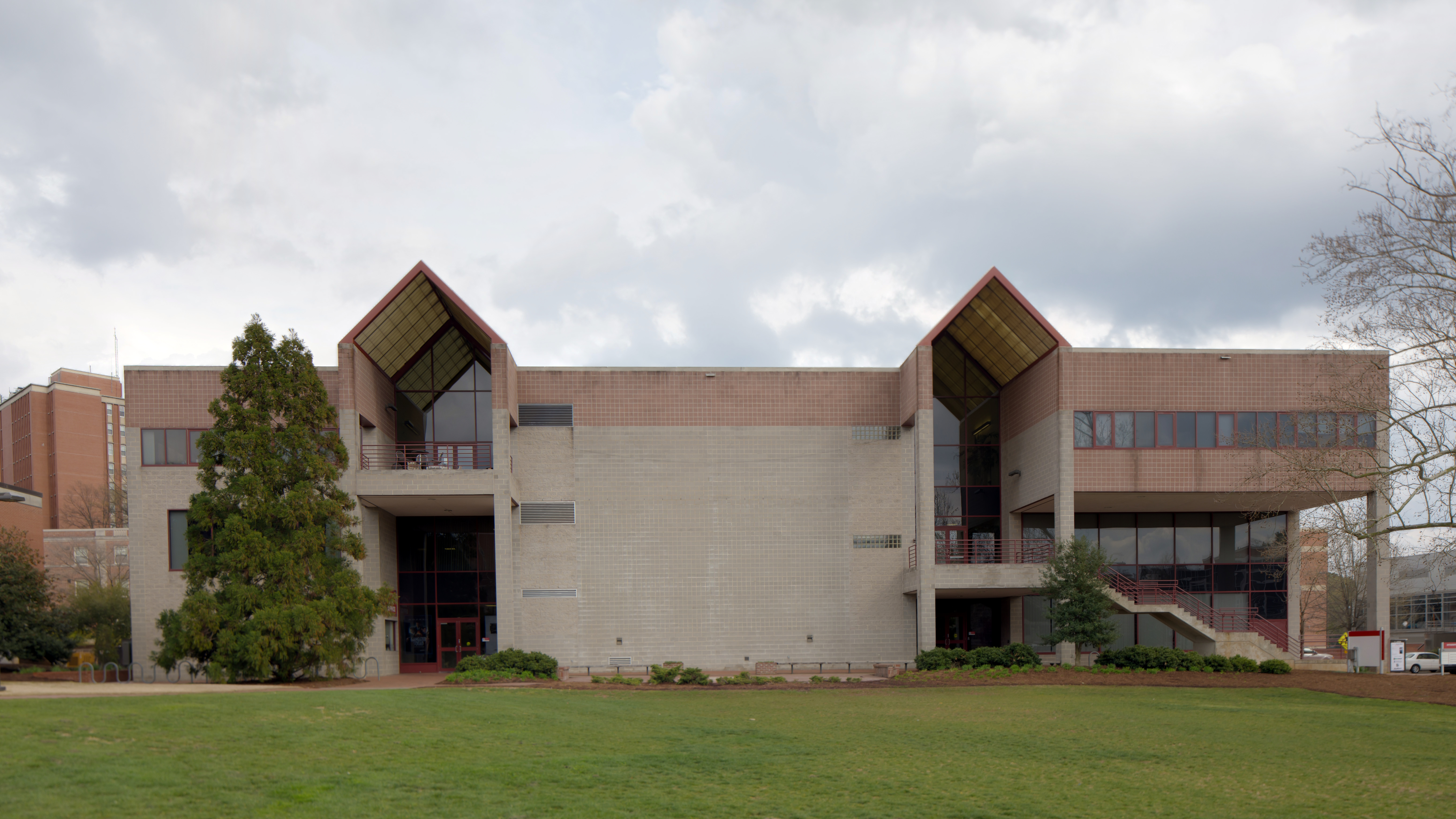
Witherspoon Student Center

=== Witherspoon Student Center ===
Home to the Campus Cinema, Student Media, and the African American Cultural Center, this building opened in 1991 under the name "Student Center Annex." The building was renamed in honor of Dr. Augustus Witherspoon, the second African American student to receive a Ph.D. from NC State, in 1995. This was the first building on NC State's campus named for an African American. Witherspoon held the following positions at NCSU: professor, associate dean of the Graduate School, and associate provost and coordinator of African-American affairs, among others.

==== Campus Cinema ====
North Carolina State has its own movie theater located in Witherspoon Student Center. The Campus Cinema shows a variety of movies, most often ones that have just left theatres. Admission is free, and popcorn is also available free of charge. The movie schedule is updated twice a semester. The University Activities Board (UAB) holds surveys in which students vote for which films they wish to be shown the following semester.

=== Dining halls ===
All three of the university's major all-you-can-eat dining halls are located on Central Campus: Fountain, Case, and Clark. Fountain Dining Hall is the largest of the three and predominantly serves western Central Campus. Due to its limited seating capacity, Case Dining Hall is restricted primarily to residents of nearby residence halls on Central Campus and athletes. NCSU introduced the "all you can eat" concept in 1971 with breakfast and dinner costing $0.75 and $1.65, respectively.

=== Reynolds Coliseum ===
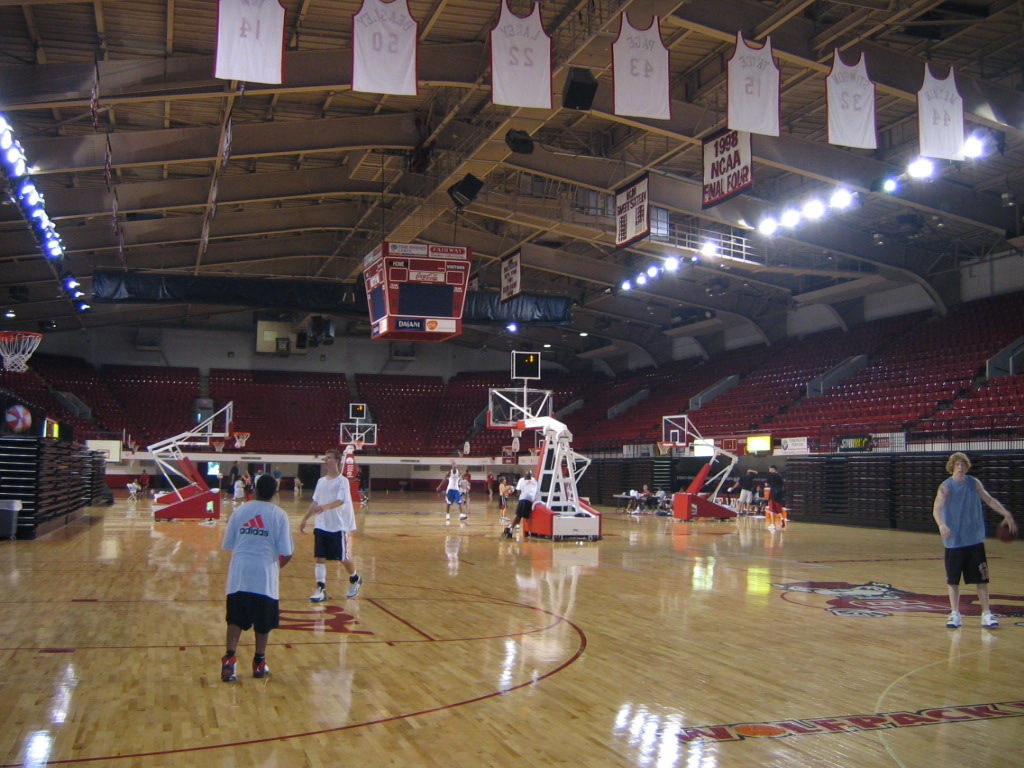
Inside Reynolds Coliseum

Reynolds Coliseum is a multi-purpose arena on Central Campus that hosts many campus-oriented and sports events, most notably the Wolfpack Women's basketball games. Prior to the completion of the RBC Center—located off-campus—it also hosted the Men's basketball games. One non-conference men's game is played in Reynolds each season, and is known as the "Heritage Game".

Extensive remodeling began in March 2015, scheduled to finish in August 2016, costing an estimated $35 million. The project will move the competition floor toward the south end of the building while lowering the seating capacity to 5,500 (a bit higher for festival events). The north end of the building will feature a new Walk of Fame and History, including a permanent home for the NC State Athletic Hall of Fame, as well as new offices for women's basketball and volleyball. Restrooms, concessions and hospitality areas will be renovated and concourses will be widened. A new video control room for all sports will be added. And for the first time, the entire arena will be air-conditioned.

=== Carmichael Complex ===
The Carmichael Complex or Carmichael Gymnasium is a set of interconnected sports and physical education buildings situated on Cates Avenue on Central Campus. The complex features a weight room, and indoor running track, a gymnasium and the Willis R. Casey Aquatic Center, a swimming pool and aquatics building. The NC State swim team calls the Casey Aquatics Center home, but the pool is also open to recreational swimming.

=== Doak Field ===
Doak Field is a baseball stadium located west of the major residence halls on Central Campus. It is home to NC State's Wolfpack baseball team, and has been since its completion in 1966.

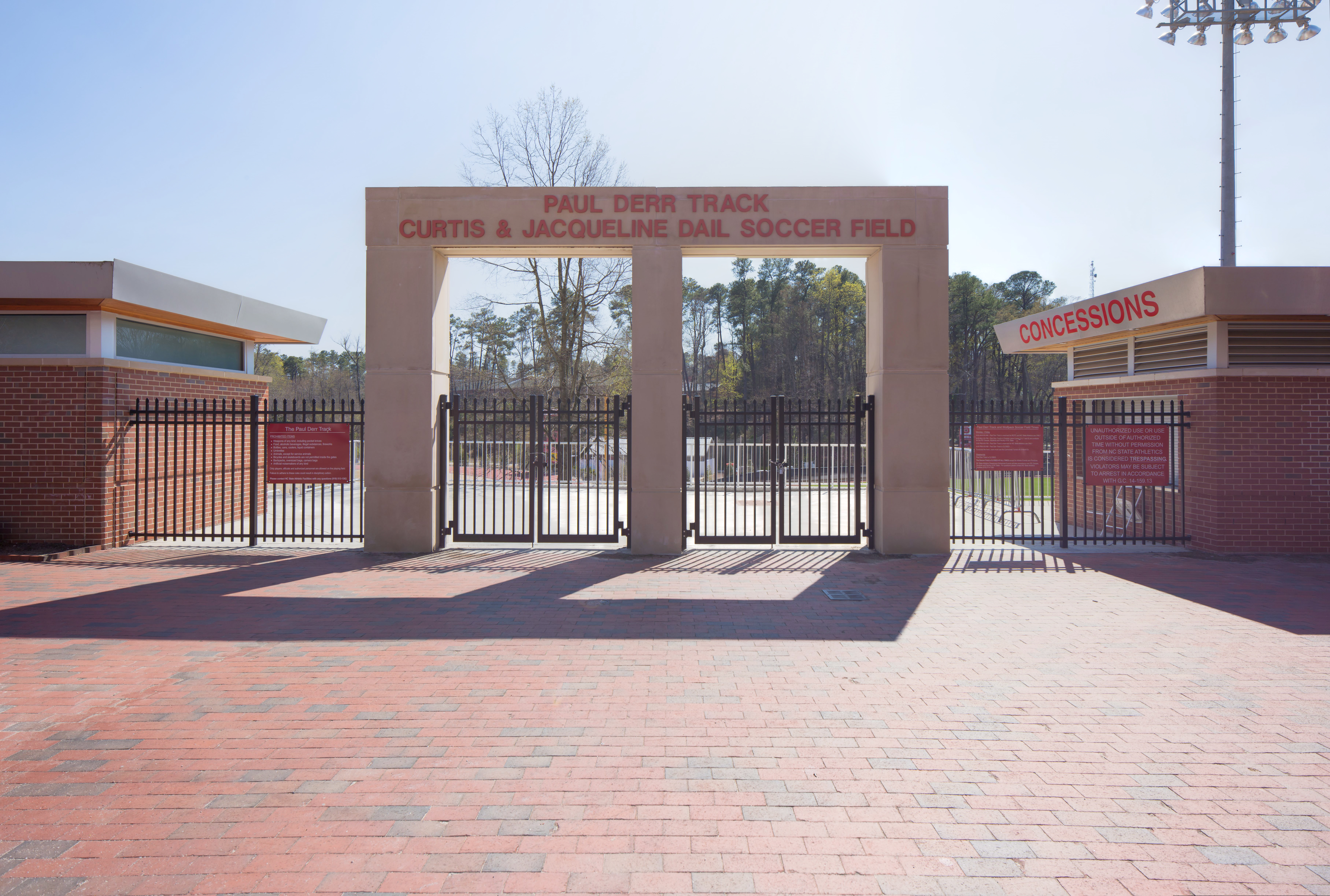
Entrance to Paul Derr Track

=== Derr Track and Dail Stadium ===
Paul Derr Track and the adjoining Curtis & Jacqueline Dail Softball Stadium are currently being reconstructed on Central Campus, south of Reynolds Coliseum. The old Paul Derr Track was from 1993 home to Sprint Capitol USA, the group of sprinters trained by BALCO informant and now federal investigated Jamaican coach, Trevor Graham.

When completed, the new Paul Derr Track will be a stadium for NC State track and field events and soccer games. It will consist of an oval (rounded rectangle) running track with a soccer field situated in the center. Dail Stadium will be a new softball stadium, primarily for NC State's softball team. It is being constructed at the corner of Morill Drive and Cates Avenue next to Derr Track. When complete, the track and the softball field will share the same main entrance.

== South Campus ==
South Campus lies south of Western Boulevard and consists of Greek (Fraternity) Court, the McKimmon Center, Visitor Center, and the Avent Ferry Complex, as well as few labs and specialty buildings. South Campus is the least developed of the three sections of Main Campus; no large classroom halls are located there. South of South Campus lies Centennial Campus. South Campus is intertwined with commercial businesses and non-university buildings, mostly along Avent Ferry Road and Western Boulevard.

== Former buildings ==
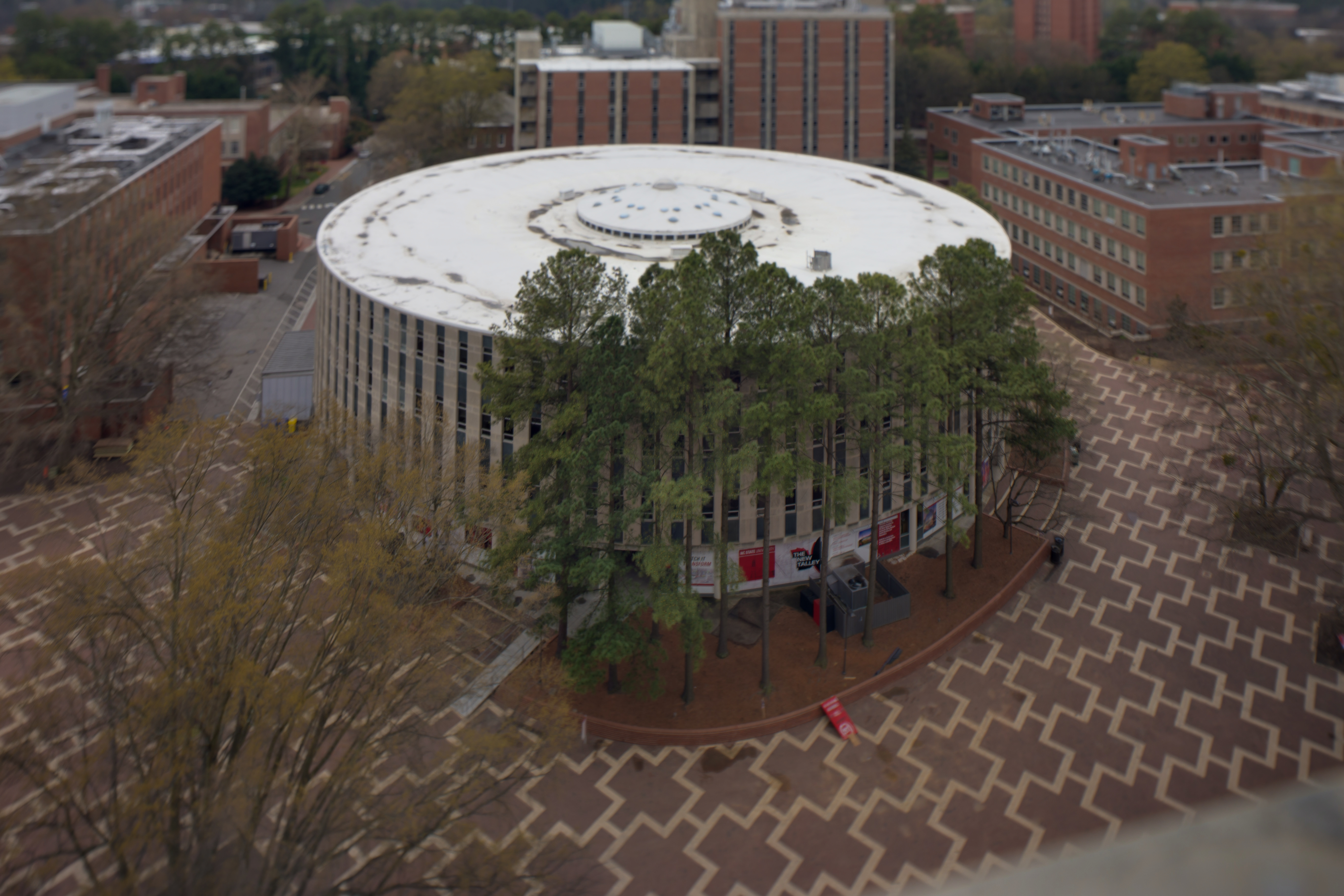
Harrelson Hall from D.H. Hill Library, 2013.

=== Harrelson Hall (1961 - 2015) ===
Harrelson Hall mid-deconstruction

Harrelson Hall, located at the foot of the Brickyard on the North Campus, was one of the more distinctive buildings at NCSU. Its structure was in the shape of a cylinder, 261 feet (80 m) in diameter, with a mostly open-air plaza ground floor. It was named after mathematics professor John W. Harrelson and designed by E. W. "Terry" Waugh. Constructed in 1961, Harrelson Hall was the first cylindrical classroom structure built on a university campus. It was four stories high (although the top floor was designated as the third floor). A ramp with access to floors 1 through 3 wrapped around the building's central column; three stairways and one elevator also provided access to the upper floors. The 105,732-square-foot (9,822.8 m^{2}) building housed offices and classrooms for Mathematical Sciences, Foreign Languages, Sociology, and Anthropology. Windowless lecture halls were located within the inner portion and offices were along the rim. Harrelson, along with Poe Hall, was one of only two non-brick buildings on NCSU Main Campus.

Harrelson Hall earned a reputation on campus for having cramped uncomfortable rooms with poor sight lines and extremely tight, antiquated seating.

Deconstruction, with a goal to recycle over 90 percent of the building, started in 2015, and was completed in the summer of 2016. Instead of an instantaneous demolition, the building was decomposed piecemeal to mitigate seismic vibrations in the area, which includes a nuclear reactor.

== See also ==
- Centennial Campus
- Centennial Biomedical Campus
