= D. H. Hill Jr. Library =

Library at North Carolina State University in Raleigh, US

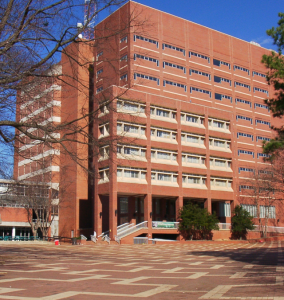
- Hill Library pictured in 2006 from the Brickyard
- 35.7876°N 78.6697°W
- Location: North Campus, North Carolina State University, USA
- Type: Academic
- Established: 1925
- Branch of: NC State University Libraries

Collection
- Size: 1.04 million physical volumes

Other information
- Website: https://www.lib.ncsu.edu/hill

The D. H. Hill Jr. Library is one of two main libraries at North Carolina State University. It is the third building to house the NC State University Libraries, following Brooks Hall and Holladay Hall. The current building, situated on the Hillsborough Street edge of North Campus, is the result of four stages of construction, and houses the majority of the volumes in NC State's collection.

As of 2020, the system's total holdings amount to over 3.28 million available volumes, 122,839 electronic journal subscriptions, 511 print subscriptions, 685 bibliographic databases, and access to over 1.3 million electronic books. In the 2019–2020 academic year, the Libraries saw over 16 million total uses. The Libraries' collection is the smallest among the "Big 3" Universities in the Triangle Research Libraries Network—the other two library systems being Duke University (7.26 million volumes as of 2016) and UNC at Chapel Hill (9.19 million volumes as of 2016).

== Location ==
The library is situated on Hillsborough Street, on the north edge of campus. The main entrance is on the campus side, integrated into University Plaza (the Brickyard). Prior to 1990, the library was also accessible from the Hillsborough Street side through the Erdahl-Cloyd Wing entrance; however, this entrance was closed that year due to financial and security considerations, as well as numerous complaints about heavy pedestrian traffic through this entrance, which opened into a study and reading area. In 2020, with the completion of major renovations to the library, the Hillsborough Street entrance was reopened.

== Name ==
D. H. Hill Jr. Library is named after Daniel Harvey Hill Jr., once part-time NC State librarian, and president of NC State in 1908. He was the son of the scholar and notable Confederate Army General Daniel Harvey Hill. The library's name did not include Jr. until May 2019, when it was changed to more accurately reflect that the library is named after D. H. Hill Jr. rather than his father.

== History of the NC State Libraries ==
=== D. H. Hill Jr. Library (Main Library) ===
==== Early years (1889–1926) ====
In December 1889, the University Board of Trustees authorized $650 for periodicals and books, which were placed in a single room in Holladay Hall. The collection was overseen by the university's first professor of English and future third chancellor, Daniel Harvey Hill Jr. Comprising 1,500 volumes by 1890, it reflected Hill's scholarly and literary interests instead of a purely scientific and engineering focus; indeed, the library was considered to be part of the Department of English. Through the 1890s, the collection primarily consisted of required reading materials for English courses taught by Hill and American and European history courses taught by Professor Alexander Holladay. The concept of a centralized library system was not considered; by 1893, the departments of agriculture, horticulture, mechanics, physics and mechanical and civil engineering had each developed their own reference collections separately from the primary library. The library moved to three rooms on the third floor of Main Building in the fall of 1897. In 1899, the University of Texas librarian, Benjamin Wyche, came as a consultant and introduced the Dewey Decimal System of classification, a card catalog and library cards; also that year, Edward Bentley Owen, a recent graduate of the college, was hired as librarian. In 1899, the collection totaled some 3,000 volumes, increasing to 3,500 volumes and 125 periodicals by the following year.

In its first years, the library received little support. The annual library expenditure was $100 in 1892, raised to $400 in 1895. The maintenance budget remained below $1000 until 1925 and records of books borrowed and returned were recorded by hand in a large ledger. Not until 1902 would the first permanent University librarian, Marshall DeLancey Heywood, be hired; however, he resigned the following year after a cut in salary and was succeeded by Caroline Sherman, the first female librarian. A very particular librarian who served until 1906, she would go so far as to fumigate books returned from patrons who had contracted infectious diseases. In the fall of 1903, the library relocated to the ground floor of the old Pullen Hall (built 1902, destroyed by arson February 1965), where it would remain for the next 22 years. Sherman reported directly to Professor Hill, who remained the permanent chairman of the university library committee and who continued to oversee the selection of books for the library. However, Hill also began subscribing to state newspapers, one for every county, and made them freely available to students for casual reading. He also had books arranged on open shelves to reduce the need for using the card catalog. Sherman was succeeded by Elsie Stockard, who served as librarian until June 1910. In 1908, Hill became the third president of State College, and relinquished his position as chair of the library committee. The new committee heads, English professors Thomas P. Harrison and George Sumney, initiated the process of asking department heads to recommend new books for the library. Under the supervision of Charlotte M. Williamson, librarian from 1910 to 1923, library holdings grew to 7,500 print volumes and 150 magazines and journals by 1911. However, library growth remained slow; the annual library budget continued to be about $500 during Hill's tenure as college president. By 1916, when Hill retired, the collection only numbered some 8,000 volumes, excluding materials in departmental libraries.

In October 1922, with the situation in a dismal state, a resolution was adopted by university alumni resolving that, "the Board of Trustees be asked to include in their recommendations to the Legislature of 1923 a request for an appropriation of $250,000 to build and equip a library capable of serving the needs of a greater and better North Carolina State College of Agriculture and Engineering."

By 1923, the library's numerous deficiencies were all too clear; one dean later recalled the library "consisted of a half-dozen half-filled stacks. Nearly everything was hopelessly out of date." Following a report produced by a federal expert, the new college president, Eugene Brooks, hired James R. Gulledge (1891–1941) as the first professionally trained head librarian. That fall, all materials in departmental libraries were brought under a central cataloging system as a part of the main library.

On December 28, plans were made to construct a new library building (now Brooks Hall), for $227,500. While the library acquired its 10,000th volume in 1924, a fire destroyed the library catalogue the same year. As a result, the library classification system changed to the Library of Congress Classification, which remains in use through the present day. Inter-library loans were introduced in 1925. The new D. H. Hill Library opened with a limited schedule on October 15, 1925, opened with full service hours on January 1, 1926, and was dedicated on June 7, 1926. Built at a final cost of $266,500, including $25,000 for equipment, it was designed by New York architect Hobart Upjohn in a post-colonial style reminiscent of Monticello. The main reading room occupied the whole of the rear of the entrance hall; it and a separate periodicals room provided space for 250 readers, or about 20 percent of the college's total student population. The second floor was occupied by graduate student and faculty seminar and research rooms, while bookstacks with a maximum capacity for 150,000 volumes were housed in the basement. By this time, the main library collection totaled 15,000 volumes, which subsequently rose to about 18,000 following the integration of the various departmental libraries with the main collection. However, only 7,301 of the volumes in the collection were allowed to circulate, with the remaining 11,569 reserved for library use.

==== Gradual growth (1926–1959) ====
Despite the opening of the new library, the NC State College library system remained inadequate. In early 1926, an American Library Association report ranked the State library last among 50 land-grant institutions in terms of volumes held. Of the three major colleges and universities in the area, State's collection of about 15,000 volumes ranked well below that of the University of North Carolina's 150,000 volumes and Duke's 85,000 volumes. The average circulation of less than four books per student remained well below the average of 13 books per student reported by comparative institutions, while the library budget was only 10 percent of the lowest recommended percentage of an institution's annual library allocation. On March 8, the college Library Committee requested "each school faculty and the general College faculty [to] consider these matters seriously, with a view of bringing this College up to a standard of at least a general average." In 1926, the library staff consisted of James Gulledge as head librarian, with Charlotte Williams as reference librarian, assistant librarian Agnes Cooper (loans, circulation and periodicals), assistant librarian Jeannette Burroughs (cataloguing), and seven part-time student library assistants.

Gulledge left in the spring of 1926 to take up a position at Louisiana State University, and the position of librarian was eliminated. Instead, to save money, the college placed the library under the aegis of the Library Committee, with the intention of using the savings to purchase books. Frank Capps, the committee's executive secretary, was designated library supervisor, though he lacked the required qualifications. While the annual library expenditure had increased to about $3,000 by the early 1930s, library services remained poor. In 1931, the collection totaled 30,000 volumes. In 1933, the university collaborated with UNC and Duke University to form the North Carolina Union Catalog, the first shared catalog among the three universities. Capps resigned in July, and was briefly succeeded by the History chair Hugh Talmadge Lefler (1901–1981) as acting library director before being replaced with William Porter Kellam (1905–1993) on July 1 the following year.

The first professional Director in several years, and the first modern one, Kellam found the library in a chaotic state upon taking up his appointment; government publications and periodicals lay uncatalogued in the basement, faculty members were allowed to keep books indefinitely and academic departments had continued to purchase books and periodicals, but had generally neither cataloged them properly nor made them available to others. The student assistants who operated the library during nights and weekends were poorly trained, poorly supervised and often disorganized. To rectify the situation, Kellam centralized the acquisition of periodicals, increased the number of professional librarians on staff, nearly doubled the number of volumes in the collection and organized the library into five departments: circulation, reference (documents), order (books and periodicals), cataloging and periodicals (check-in, binding, exchanges). Each department was headed by a professional librarian. As a result, hours of service increased during evenings and weekends, faculty members were allowed to only keep borrowed materials for a year before having to renew them and a training program was instituted for student assistants. A browsing room opened in 1936 and the collection grew to 50,000 volumes in 1937. The University Archives were begun in the university's 50th anniversary year in 1939, and expenditures increased to $10,000 the same year; the number of current periodicals received by the library nearly doubled from 400 to 700. However, by the time Kellam left on August 31, 1939, the D. H. Hill Library building was found to be cramped and functionally obsolete. The library was no longer in the center of the campus, as the campus had expanded west over the previous decade. As Kellam concluded, "...the present library building was planned from an artistic point of view and not for efficiency and without benefit of a librarian's advice. The same mistake should not be repeated."

On September 1, 1939, the day the Second World War broke out, Circulation Librarian Harlan Craig Brown (1906 – 10 October 1982) was appointed as Kellam's successor. Appointed as the circulation librarian in 1936, he had helped to transform that area of library operations; during his 25 years as Director, he would oversee the transformation of D. H. Hill into a major university library. Library holdings reached 60,000 volumes in 1940. During the Second World War, all male library staff members entered the services, including Brown, who left for the army in November 1942. He served as an infantry captain in Europe. During his absence, reference librarian Reba Davis Clevenger served as acting Director, with a staff of six professional librarians and four others. In 1945, Clevenger and the Library Committee presented a report which highlighted three urgent needs: a new, centralized library building, a greatly increased book and periodicals budget and more and better-paid staff.

Brown resumed the library directorship on September 1, 1946. The Friends of the Library organization was formed on September 21, 1946, and library holdings reached 75,000 volumes by 1947 and 100,000 volumes in February 1949. During the immediate postwar years, the library struggled; the now-obsolete building only provided seating for four percent of the total student and faculty population. Library expenditures, while by now $75,000, remained inadequate to support a well-functioning library. Finally, the 1948–1949 North Carolina General Assembly approved $1.25 million to construct and outfit a new library building. Planning began in 1949, and the contract was awarded to Northup and O'Brien Architects of Winston-Salem on August 6, 1951. Construction of a new D. H. Hill Library to replace the outgrown building began in the spring of 1952, at the present location on the Brickyard. The new four-story brick and limestone library (today the "East Wing" of D. H. Hill) was completed in December 1953 and opened in the summer of 1954. It provided 900 seats for patrons, space for 400,000 volumes and the possibility of adding another two stories should the need arise. Bookstacks were closed to undergraduates, but were open to graduate students and faculty once they had been given a tour by the circulation librarian and received a stack permit. The library was formally dedicated on March 12, 1955, and the School of Design moved into the vacated library building (now Brooks Hall).

A year after the opening of the East Wing, the Erdahl-Cloyd Student Union was built, occupying the present "West Wing" of the library. Library holdings reached 175,000 volumes in 1955, and reached 200,000 volumes by 1960. However, two major surveys conducted in 1954 and 1957 revealed the library to have fewer volumes per student than any other major North Carolina research college, a collection 50 percent smaller than those at other Southern land-grant colleges, undefined and inadequate coordination between the library director and the branch libraries, lack of coordination among the different technical departments within the library and a rigid and unhelpful system of closed bookstacks and stack permits. Finally, the college was found to only hold about 40 percent of materials which would be useful in the fields it served.

==== Accelerating development (1959–1971) ====
From 1959, the library implemented many of the changes suggested in the reports. In 1962, the first full-time African-American library staff member, Edward Walker, was hired as a mail clerk first class (he would retire in 1992 as the bookstack supervisor). The following year, librarians were raised to professional faculty status. After 25 years of service, Harlan Brown resigned as Director of the Library on September 1, 1964 for reasons of health, and was succeeded by Isaac Thomas Littleton (born 1921) as acting Director; Brown would continue as associate Director until his retirement as Director Emeritus on July 1, 1971. Maurice Toler became the first professional University Archivist in 1965, the same year library holdings passed 300,000 volumes and the library was air-conditioned. Owing to the rapid expansion of both the university and the library, the new library building was outgrown a decade after it had opened. Littleton and the library staff proposed a 110,000 square-foot bookstack addition to the original building, renovation of the existing building to house offices and reference and research functions and converting the Erdahl-Cloyd Student Union into an undergraduate library. Odell Associates, Inc. was selected as the architectural firm, and $2.483 million was initially appropriated for construction by the 1967 General Assembly, with additional state funds being approved in April 1968.

From 1960 to 1970, library expenditures increased from $120,000 to $1.31 million. Library holdings passed 400,000 volumes and 5,678 periodicals in 1967, the same year NC State and five area colleges (Meredith College, Shaw University, William Peace University, St. Mary's School, and St. Augustine's University) established the Cooperating Raleigh Colleges Program, allowing direct borrowing of library resources among the six campuses. On July 1, Acting Director Littleton was confirmed as Director. On December 8, closing hours were extended from 11 p.m. to 1 a.m. During the summer and early fall of 1967, unknown thieves stole "at least 16 sets of journals and bibliographical works" from the Library, including two valuable sets of 18th and 19th-century botanical journals, comprising 100 bound volumes. As a result, a security checkpoint was installed at the bookstack entrance on February 12, 1968. Construction on a new 10-story bookstack tower began on November 18. In 1970, the same year library holdings passed 500,000 volumes, William V. Frazier was hired as the library's first African-American librarian and William C. Horner became the first systems librarian. Frazier had previously been a sociology instructor and assistant reference librarian at NCCU. In 1971, the individual school libraries – Design, Textiles and Forest Resources – were classified as branch libraries.

==== Expansion and computerization (1971–2001) ====
A single library entrance from the Brickyard was opened in 1971. In 1972, the student union moved into Talley Student Center, and the Erdahl-Cloyd Union became the West Wing. It was connected to the East Wing by the new 10-story (numbered G, 1–9) Bookstack North Tower; opened on March 5, 1971, it added space for 1.2 million volumes and added 900 seats, 50 study carrels and 70 locked research study rooms. Coinciding with the 83rd anniversary of NC State's founding, the North Tower was dedicated on October 3, 1972. Previously, the library had had closed bookstacks, which were opened to all students following the construction of the new addition. In 1973, library holdings passed 600,000 volumes, and NC State became a charter member of the Southeastern Library Network (SOLINET), now Lyrasis.

The Jesse-Ringo Survey Report of 1957–1958 had strongly recommended the Erdahl-Cloyd Student Union (designed by W.H. Deitrick, an architect and a professor in the School of Design, and opened in 1954) be converted into an undergraduate library; the student union consisted of a cafeteria on the ground floor, recreation space on the first floor and a theatre on the second floor. The conversion to a library was approved in the fall of 1966; however, the university decided to maintain the ground-floor cafeteria due to the lack of food service on North Campus, despite protests from the library directors and staff. As the foundations of the Erdahl-Cloyd Wing were insufficiently strong to support heavy bookstacks, the university decided to locate the Reserve Reading Room and an open-shelf browsing area on the first floor. In June 1972, the student union vacated the building and moved to the new Talley Student Center. Owing to the first floor of the Erdahl-Cloyd Wing being six feet lower than the first floor of the bookstack tower, an elevator had to be installed to bridge the gap; lighting also needed to be improved on the first floor. A 150-seat theatre on the second floor was renovated in 1974, and the Reserve Reading Room occupied the renovated building in May 1975.

Computerised cataloguing of materials began in 1975, and the card catalogue began to be retroactively converted in 1976. Also in 1976, collections totaled over 700,000 volumes, and a Rare Book and Special Collections Room was established adjacent to the University Archives and was administered by the Reference Department. In 1977, the library directors of NC State, UNC-Chapel Hill and Duke University began planning a cooperative program for the three major Triangle universities. In 1978, the 800,000th volume was added to the collection.

By the end of the 1970s, the new bookstack addition was becoming crowded, barely a decade after it had been constructed. In January 1976, the university began planning another library addition. In December 1981, the library submitted two alternate plans for the expansion, one for a building with space for 3,000 seats and 2 million volumes at a cost of $25 million, and a revised alternate plan for an addition of about half the size presented in the first plan. Both were rejected by the 1981–1982 state legislature. Other suggestions from campus planners and independent experts included building the new addition to the west of the previous one, or adding two floors to the East Wing and storing lesser-used books in a remote storage building.

From January to April 1982, an ad hoc planning committee reviewed the planning documents; the committee submitted a tentative report in mid-April in which it recommended an addition with a minimum capacity of 750,000 volumes and 1,000 to 3,000 seats. On April 1, the firm of Six Associates, Inc. of Asheville was selected as the project architect. Detailed planning began in late May, at which time all previous concepts for the addition were dismissed. On May 29, the architects proposed a plan for an innovative expansion from both the south and east sides of the building; the proposal would incorporate room for over 2 million volumes and nearly 3,000 seats. However, the proposal was ultimately considered too costly and ambitious. A modified plan, in which only the south addition would be built, was approved in 1984 and thoroughly worked out by August 1985; under the plan, the 80,000 square-foot addition would contain bookstacks for an additional 550,000 volumes, a main ground-floor entrance from the Brickyard, a reading room to the right of the entrance, a wide staircase sweeping up to the first floor of the original tower and the circulation desk and a balcony overlooking the reading room.

Library holdings reached 1 million volumes in 1981. On May 4, 1983, NC State became a member of the Association of Research Libraries (ARL). Site preparation for the new library addition, which involved demolishing the large exterior concrete staircase leading to the library tower, began in August 1985 and ended in February 1986. Navarro Construction of Pittsburgh, PA, was selected as the general contractor in the summer of 1986, and they began construction that October. However, they abandoned the project due to financial troubles, necessitating the employment of new contractors, which delayed completion of the addition by two years. In 1986, the library system's online catalog, the Bibliographic Information System (BIS), became active. In addition to providing information on library holdings, BIS gave users access to information on holdings at the other TRLN libraries. The card catalogue fell out of use in 1987, and "The NCSU Libraries" became the official name of the library system. In August, Susan Nutter (1944–2019) became the first female director of the NCSU Libraries, succeeding I.T. Littleton; she became president of the ARL six years later. In 1989, the 100th anniversary year of the founding of NCSU Libraries, the system assumed administrative control over the University Archives.

On October 1, 1990, the current library was completed with the addition of the 11-story (numbered B, G, 1–9) Bookstack South Tower, adding space for another 500,000 volumes. The Information Technologies Teaching Center (ITTC) was established that same year, initially funded by a gift from the senior class of 1990. In December 1991, the Library began a trial of an electronic document delivery service for university researchers.

A new and more accessible information system which could be accessed through the Internet was introduced in 1993; along with the online catalogue, it included access to external databases and journal indexes. In 1994, the year the Libraries' holdings reached 2 million volumes, NCSU Libraries was selected by the ARL as one of six "Research Libraries of the Future." Daily van delivery between the branch libraries and D. H. Hill began the same year. In 1995, the Special Collections Research Center was established, and self-service circulation began at D. H. Hill. In 1996, the Library began the current 24-hour, five-days-a week service, formed the Digital Library Initiatives Department and with aid from a tuition increase, NCSU Libraries initiated the TRIPSaver service for patrons to expedite retrieval of items from other TRLN libraries. In 1997, the NCSU Libraries become a charter member of the JSTOR electronic archive of journal articles. In 2000, the NCSU Libraries won the first "Excellence in Academic Libraries Award," sponsored by the Association of College and Research Libraries (ACRL), in the university library category.

==== The 21st century (2001–present) ====
In 2001, library holdings reached three million volumes. The "Hill of Beans" cafe' opened the following year. After years of seating and storage shortages, a Satellite Shelving Facility was opened in 2003 to store low-use materials. In 2005, the Librarian, Susan Nutter, was named "Librarian of the Year" by the Library Journal. In 2006, the Libraries introduced a revolutionary new online catalogue based on the Endeca platform, which provided users with advanced search and navigation capabilities. The library's East Wing underwent a large-scale renovation targeted at creating a study/work/recreation/socializing area with technology integration. The newly renovated wing was reopened on March 12, 2007 after a large ribbon-cutting ceremony.

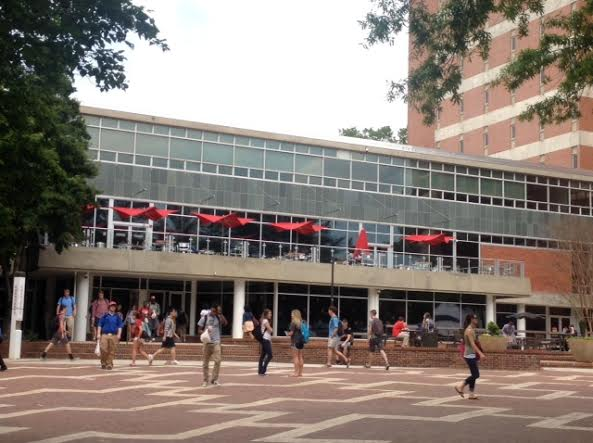
The outdoor terrace featured at D. H. Hill Jr. Library

The 4 millionth volume was added to the library collection in 2009. On April 20, 2009, University Dining, partnered with the department of food science and D. H. Hill Library, opened the Creamery ice cream shop in the West Wing. During the summer of 2011, further renovations to the West Wing transformed an area formerly housing print periodicals into over 13,600 feet of study space, also allowing trials with the new furnishings and technology to be installed in the Hunt Library. A lounge area by the Creamery became the Technology Sandbox, with whiteboards, gaming stations, writable glass walls and interactive tables. A large portion of an area where print periodicals were previously located became a glass-enclosed silent reading room with 70 seats for individual study, marble-topped tables and power outlets; the area overlooks an outdoor terrace. The terrace had been built in 1954 when the West Wing was the Erdahl-Cloyd Student Union. Frequently used for dances; it fell into disuse after the student union moved to the Talley Student Center in 1972, remaining vacant for decades. In the summer of 2011, the terrace was repaired and modernized; the original exterior glass wall separating the new reading room from the terrace was replaced with energy-efficient glass, allowing views of the Brickyard from the reading room. Umbrella-topped tables and colourful lounge chairs providing seating for 70 were installed, along with power outlets and a new railing.

In 2014, the number of volumes in the Libraries' collections passed 5 million. Though the construction of Hunt Library nearly tripled the Libraries' seating capacity from 5 to 13 percent, concerns remained that seating capacity remained below the ideal of 20 percent of users. Director of Libraries and Vice Provost Susan Nutter retired on September 30, 2017, after 30 years as libraries director.

From May 2019 until August 2020, the D.H. Hill Jr. Library has undergone large-scale renovations which involve redesigning the main entrance to allow stairs to reach the third floor and allow views of the fourth floor, along with the construction of an Academic Success Center on the third floor. The former Hillsborough Street entrance, closed since 1990, has been redesigned and has been permanently reopened as of May 2019.

=== Design Library ===
In 1941, the Architecture Library (renamed the Harry B. Lyons Design Library in 1968) opened in Daniels Hall. It relocated to Brooks Hall in 1954 after D. H. Hill Library moved to its current location, and has remained there since, becoming a branch library in 1971.

=== Burlington Textiles Library (1944–2013) ===
On April 27, 1944, Malcolm Campbell, the Dean of the School of Textiles, presented a request for a Textile School Library to the North Carolina State College Library Committee. The Textiles Library opened on October 23, 1944, temporarily as part of the main library. The first librarian, Rachel Penn Lane, organized the textiles collection of 1000 volumes and periodicals in preparation for the transfer to Nelson Hall, which was made on June 6, 1945. The library would remain there for the next 45 years.

By May 1954, the collection had increased to 4,500 volumes, 120 periodicals, and 37 international journals. It was renamed the Burlington Textiles Library that year, when Burlington Industries funded its expansion. In 1964, a further donation by Burlington funded an expansion which doubled the library's floor space and increased seating capacity to 70. Along with the Design and the Natural Resources collections, it was reclassified as a branch library in 1971. A further expansion in 1982 increased the library's dimensions to 6000 square feet, providing room for more study space, computers and shelving. Collections increased to 20,000 volumes by 1983 and to over 25,000 volumes by 1991. In 1991, the College of Textiles and its library moved to a new building on Centennial Campus. The new 12,855 square-foot facility offered seating for 154 students; by then, library resources also included collections of fabrics and hosiery. As of 2010, the library held over 40,000 volumes and more than 90 periodicals.

In July 2007, the North Carolina General Assembly allocated planning funds for the new James B. Hunt Jr. Library to be built on Centennial Campus. The official groundbreaking took place on October 26, 2009, and the collections of the Burlington Textiles Library and certain main library materials were moved into the new library in mid-December 2012. On January 2, 2013, Hunt Library opened and the Burlington Textiles Library ceased to exist.

Librarians of the Textiles and the Burlington Textiles Library were: Rachel Penn Lane (1945–1946), Jane Byrd (1946–1947), Katherine McDiarmid (1947–1957), Martha Lynch (1957–1959; acting), Adrianna Orr (1959–1965), Geraldine Stallings (1965–1967), Davora Nielsen (1967–1969), James Baker (1969–1976), Georgia Rodeffer (1976–1984), Catherine Pollari (1985, acting), Barbara Best Nichols (1985–1990), Cynthia Ruffin (1990, interim), Paul Garwig (1990–1998), Suzanne Weiner (1998–2001) and Honora Eskridge (2001–2013).

=== Natural Resources Library ===
In 1970, the School of Forest Resources Library was established in Biltmore Hall. It became a branch library the following year. In 1989, the library was renamed the Natural Resources Library and moved to its present location in Jordan Hall. The School of Forest Resources became the College of Natural Resources in 2000.

=== William Rand Kenan Jr. Library of Veterinary Medicine ===
The library opened in the fall of 1981 as the Veterinary Medicine Library. It was officially rededicated on November 16, 2006 as the William Rand Kenan, Jr. Library of Veterinary Medicine after William Rand Kenan Jr. (1872–1965), a prominent dairy farmer, philanthropist and breeder of Jersey cattle.

=== James B. Hunt Jr. Library (Main Library) ===
The James B. Hunt Jr. Library opened on Centennial Campus on 2 January 2013 as the university's second main library and primary engineering and textiles library, replacing the Burlington Textiles Library.

== Overview of D. H. Hill Jr. Library ==
D. H. Hill was built in four major stages, from 1953 to 1990:

1. "East Wing" completed in 1953 and renovated in 2007.
2. "Erdahl-Cloyd Student Union", completed 1954, became Erdahl-Cloyd (West) Wing in 1972 and The Atrium.
3. "Bookstack North", completed in 1972, a 10-story shelving area.
4. "Bookstack South", completed in 1990, an 11-story shelving area fronting the Brickyard.

== Tenants ==
=== NC State University Libraries ===
The NC State University Libraries primarily occupies the D. H. Hill Jr. Library building; however, the building also houses other tenants, including The Creamery and Hill of Beans – both operated by University Dining. D. H. Hill Jr. Library also houses the Libraries' Special Collections Research Center.

The NC State University Libraries is composed of five libraries: D. H. Hill Jr. Library, the Harrye B. Lyons Design Library, the Natural Resources Library, the William Rand Kenan Jr. Library of Veterinary Medicine, and the newly constructed James B. Hunt Jr. Library on Centennial Campus.

=== The Atrium ===
The Atrium is a group of quick-service restaurants, accepting on-campus meal plans, "dining dollars", Visa, MasterCard and cash. It is open Monday through Thursday from 7:30 am to 10:00 pm, and Friday from 7:30 am to 3:00 pm, but is not open on weekends. The general public is welcome to the Atrium, which is located on the bottom level of the Erdahl-Cloyd Wing. Not accessible through the Erdahl-Cloyd Wing, only through the "Brickyard".

The restaurants at the Atrium include:

- Chick-Fil-A – This CFA serves a limited menu, but won an award for most sales on any college campus in 2005. Chick-Fil-A opened in the Atrium on August 24, 1994.
- Mediterranean Deli – Middle Eastern and Mediterranean dishes.
- Brickyard Pizza – Italian dishes.
- Smoothie U – made-to-order smoothies and acai bowls.

There is limited seating inside and outside the Atrium itself. This seating tends to be very full at peak lunch hours. The library proper and the Atrium are not internally connected. The Atrium underwent a comprehensive renovation, which was completed in August 2011.

=== Hill of Beans ===
The Hill of Beans coffee shop is inside the library itself, near the main entrance to the D. H. Hill library. Opened in 2002, it serves specialty coffee beverages, as well as snack and pastry items.

== Inside D. H. Hill ==
=== Hours ===
Prior to 1925, the library was open from 8 a.m. to 12:45 p.m., 1:15 to 6 p.m. and from 7 p.m. to a 10 p.m. closing time Mondays through Fridays. On weekends, it was open from 8 a.m. to 12:45 p.m. and from 1:15 p.m. until closing at 6 p.m; it was open on Sundays from 2 p.m. to 5 p.m. The first D. H. Hill Library began operations on a limited basis from November 1925, with hours from 8 a.m. to 1 p.m., 1:30 p.m. to 5 p.m. and from 7 p.m. to 10 p.m. Mondays through Fridays. Effective from January 1926, full-service library hours were from 8 a.m. to 6 p.m. and from 7 p.m. to 10 p.m. Mondays through Fridays. On March 12 1955, when the new D. H. Hill Library was dedicated, its hours were extended through 11 p.m. On December 8, 1967, closing hours were extended to midnight. In 1996, a system of 24-hour service (Sunday night through Thursday night) was instituted. Under this system, D. H. Hill was open 24 hours a day from Monday through Thursday. On Fridays and Saturdays, the Library closed at 10 p.m. On Saturdays and Sundays, the Library opened at 9 a.m. 24-hour service resumed Sunday night.

Owing to budget reductions in 2014, a modified system was developed, effective from the fall of 2014. Under this system, the Library was open from 9 a.m. to midnight on Sundays and from 7 a.m. to midnight on Mondays. On Tuesdays, the Library opened at 7 a.m. with 24-hour service through Friday night, when it closed at 10 p.m. On Saturdays, the Library opened at 9 a.m. and closed at 10 p.m. D.H. Hill Library returned to regular 24-hour service in the fall of 2015.

During the summers, the Library is open from 7 a.m. to 11 p.m. Sundays through Thursdays, and from 7 a.m. to 6 p.m. on Fridays and weekends.

=== Study areas ===
D. H. Hill provides computers and study space for approximately 5% of the 34,000 member student body. Guidelines for the University of North Carolina system call for seating of up to 20% of the student body. As a result, the James B. Hunt, Jr. Library was constructed on Centennial Campus. Despite this perceived service gap, D. H. Hill strives to accommodate the needs of students with loaner laptops, group study and individual study areas on several floors.

=== Collections ===
D. H. Hill Jr. Library houses the majority of the volumes in NCSU's collection, and is a designated federal and state document repository. Engineering and textiles collections are housed in Hunt Library on Centennial Campus. Three branch libraries house architecture/design, earth science and animal/veterinary science materials, respectively. Materials relating to education, mathematics and African studies are primarily held in three small departmental media centers, which are affiliated with the Libraries. A Satellite Shelving Facility mostly houses older journals and periodical publications for the NCSU Libraries Special Collections Research Center.

D. H. Hill and the NC State University Library system's strengths are in keeping with the strengths of the university itself, namely engineering, science, agriculture, veterinary medicine, and mathematics. The libraries also have strengths in architecture, design, humanities, and social sciences.

== Statistics ==
The NC State University Libraries is a member of several professional organizations, including the Association of Research Libraries, the Center for Research Libraries, and the Digital Library Federation. It was the first academic library organization to receive the Association of College and Research Libraries' Excellence in Academic Libraries Award. In 2003, it received the American Library Association's Library of the Future Award. Currently the NC State University Libraries employs 288 people, of which 124 are librarians or other professionals. D. H. Hill alone circulates one million volumes per year.
