= Daniel Harvey Hill Jr. =

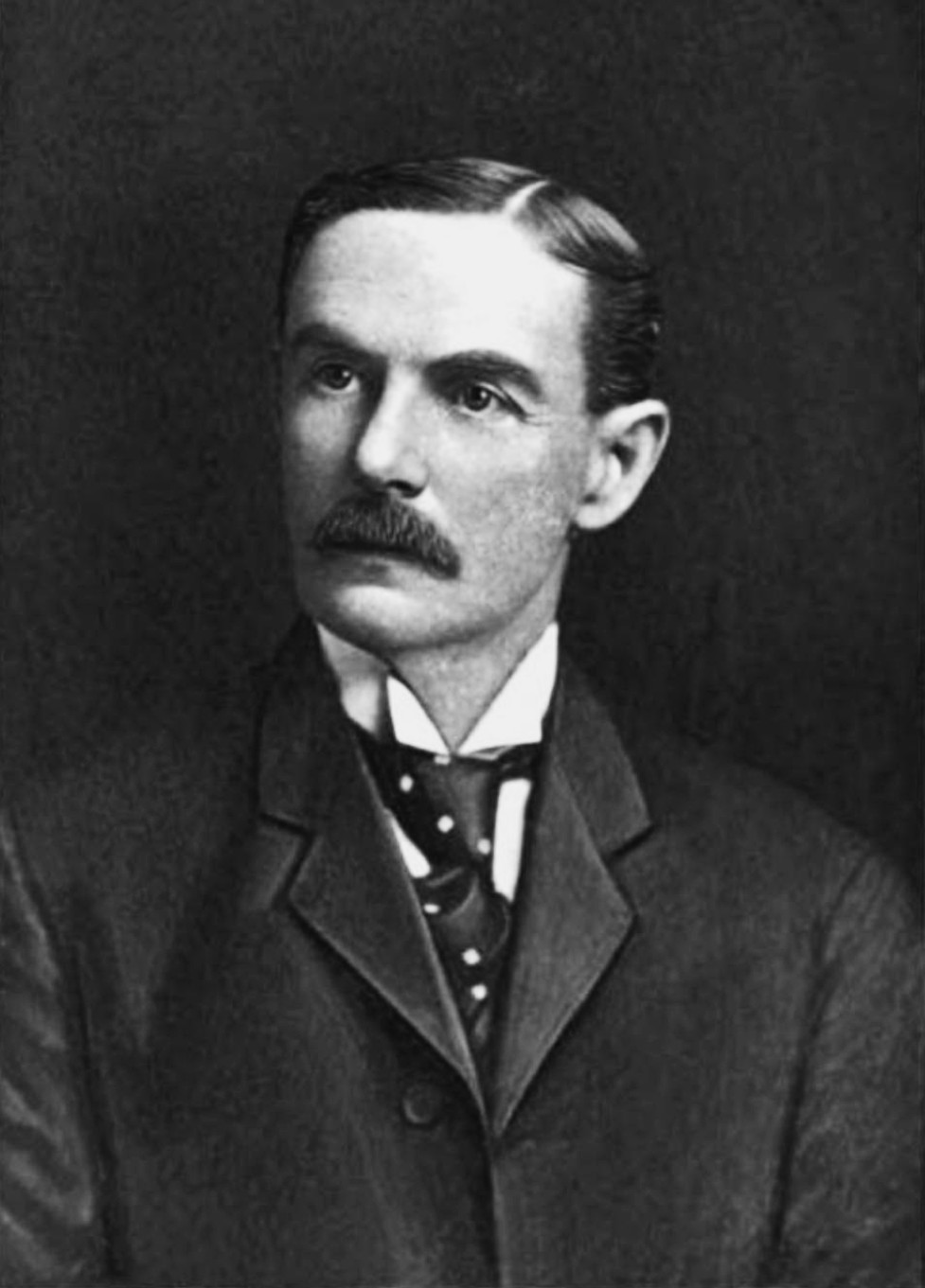
Daniel Harvey Hill Jr.

Daniel Harvey Hill Jr. (15 January 1859 – 31 July 1924) was an American librarian, educator, and the third chancellor of North Carolina State University. D. H. Hill Jr. Library on NCSU's campus is named in his honor.

== Early life ==
Hill was born on 15 January 1859 in Davidson, NC to Confederate General Daniel Harvey Hill. After attending North Carolina Military Academy and Horner and Graves Military Academy, Hill Jr. received his bachelor's and master's degrees from Davidson College in 1880 and 1886, respectively.

== Career ==
Hill began working as a professor of English and bookkeeping at North Carolina College of Agriculture and Mechanic Arts, now North Carolina State University, in 1889. A few years later, in 1909, the college Board of Trustees elected Hill the third president. During Hill's tenure, college enrollment grew to more than 700 students.

North Carolina State University's D. H. Hill Library was named for former President Hill, who served as the college's librarian after his retirement from the presidency in 1916. NCSU Libraries Special Collections Research Center serves as the repository for President Hill's manuscript collection.

== Death ==
Hill died on 31 July 1924 in Blowing Rock, North Carolina.
