= Susan Nutter =

Vice provost and director of the North Carolina State University (1944–2019)

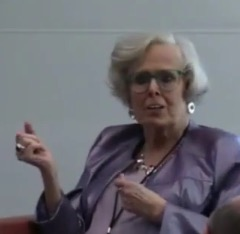
Susan Nutter in 2017

Susan Keene Nutter (1944 – March 25, 2019) was the vice provost and director of the North Carolina State University (NCSU) Libraries where she worked for thirty years. While she was director, in 2000, NCSU Libraries received the first Association of college and Research Libraries Excellence in Academic Libraries Award. She was instrumental in the planning, development, and construction of NCSU's Hunt Library. Called her "signature accomplishment," it was awarded the Stanford Prize for Innovation in Research Libraries in 2014. Before Susan's tenure NCSU Libraries "ranked near the bottom among North American research libraries." In 2016 they won the IMLS National Medal for Museum and Library Service which Nutter accepted on the libraries' behalf from Michelle Obama at the White House.

She was named Library Journal's Librarian of the Year in 2005, and received the Hugh Atkinson Memorial Award in 1999 from ACRL. ACRL also named her the Academic/Research Librarian of the Year in 2016.

Before coming to NCSU in 1987, Nutter worked at the Massachusetts Institute of Technology Libraries as, among other things, associate director for collections management and technical services. Prior to that, she was a Council on Library Resources Academic Library Management Intern at the University of North Carolina-Chapel Hill. Nutter earned a B.A. in American Literature from Colby College (1966) and MSLS from Simmons College.

== Personal life ==
Nutter was born in Massachusetts, the daughter of Dorothy Helena Victoria Nutter (née Hilmer) and Edmund Winslow Nutter. She had one sister. She married Joe Hewitt, provost of the libraries at UNC, shortly after moving to North Carolina. Nutter died on March 25, 2019, in Durham, North Carolina.
