= James B. Hunt Jr. Library =

Library at North Carolina State University

Coordinates: 35.769275°N 78.676493°W

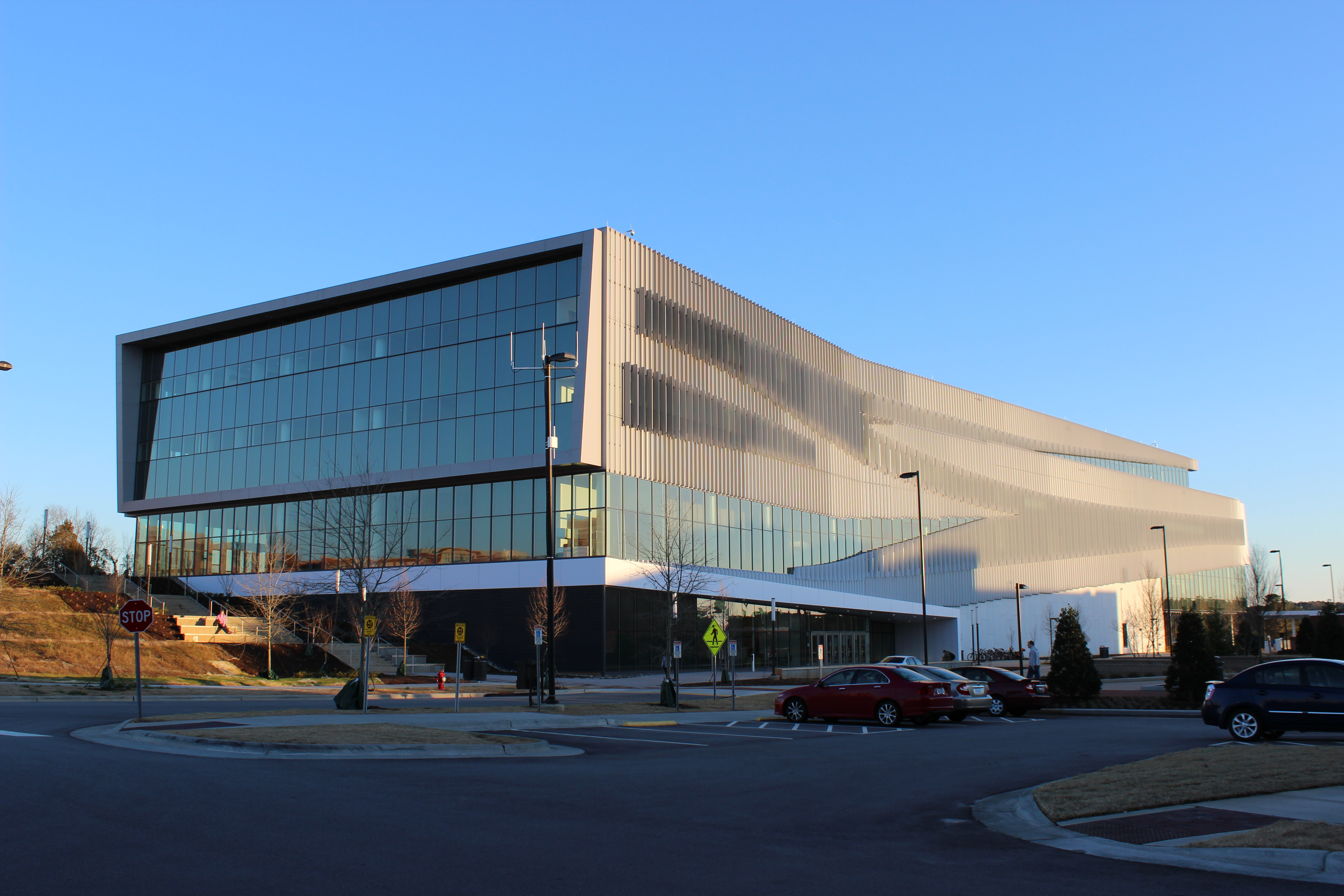
- Location: Centennial Campus, North Carolina State University, USA
- Established: January 2, 2013
- Branch of: NCSU Libraries

Collection
- Items collected: 1.5 million books

Other information
- Budget: Approx. $115.2 million
- Website: http://www.lib.ncsu.edu/huntlibrary

The James B. Hunt Jr. Library is the second main library of North Carolina State University (NCSU) and is located on the university's Centennial Campus. The $115 million facility opened in January 2013 and is best known for its architecture and technological integration, including a large robotic book storage and retrieval system which houses most of the university's engineering, textiles, and hard sciences collections. The library is named after James Baxter "Jim" Hunt Jr., the four-term 69th and 71st governor of North Carolina. NCSU Libraries is part of the Triangle Research Libraries Network (TRLN), which shares books between North Carolina State University, Duke University, The University of North Carolina at Chapel Hill, and North Carolina Central University.

== Architecture and design ==
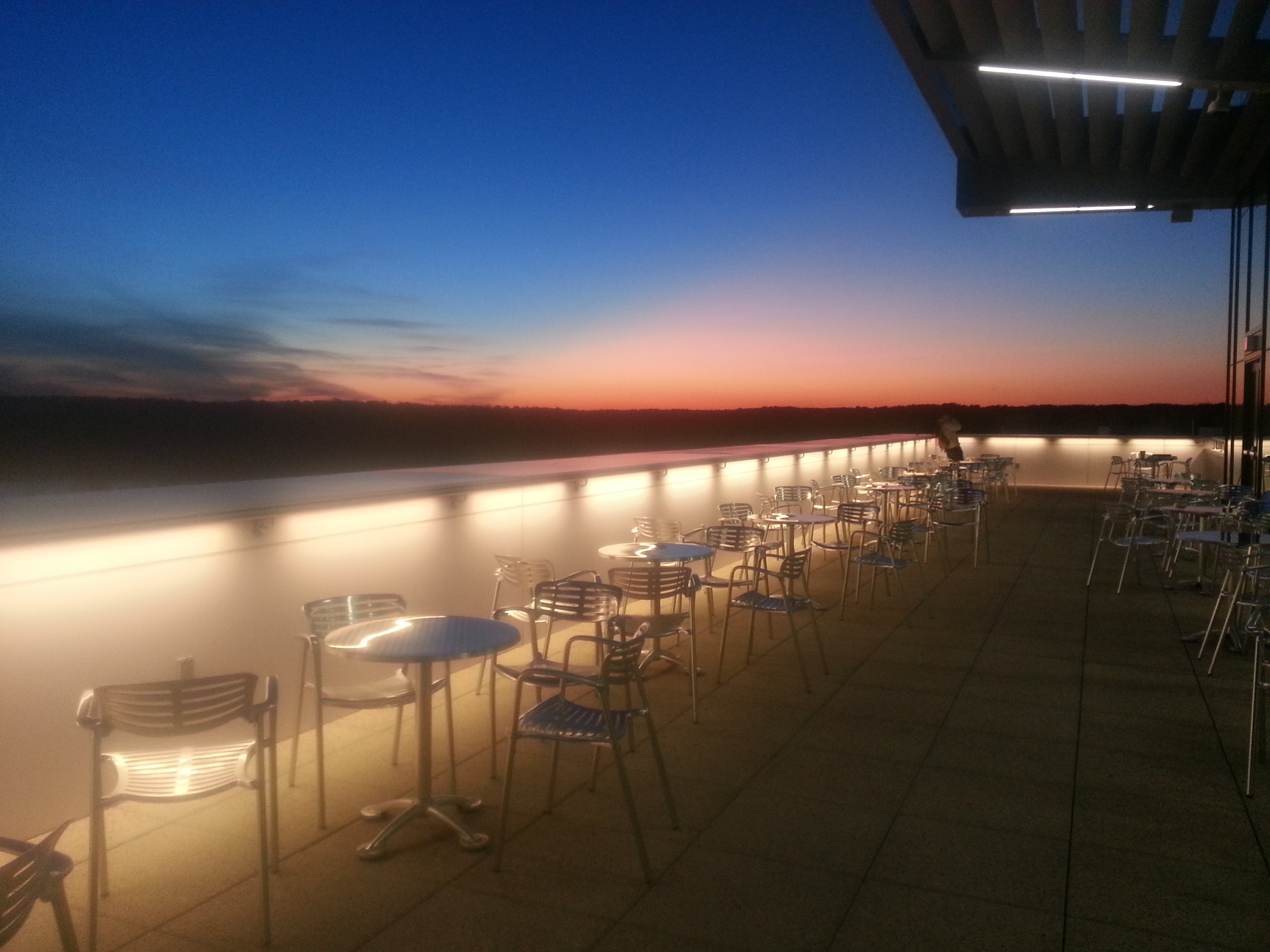
Skyline Terrace study area

Planning for the Hunt Library began in January 2008 and continued through August of the same year. Norwegian design firm Snøhetta, best known for their work on the Bibliotheca Alexandrina, served as lead designer while Raleigh-based Pearce Brinkley Cease & Lee (now Clark Nexsen) was hired as executive architect. Groundbreaking took place on October 23, 2009.

A major impetus for the library's construction was to reduce the university's "seating gap," the numerical difference between actual study space in campus libraries and NCSU's goal of providing seats for 20% of the student population. When the project's budget was cut by $11 million during the Great Recession, the bookBot was one of several innovations to emerge, enabling architects to design a smaller building without sacrificing seating. The completed library building covers more than 221,000 square feet (20,500 m^{2}), is 88 feet (27 m) high at its tallest point, and its five floors can hold 1,700 students.

Contemporary design is visible in both the building design and furnishings. A wide variety of table and chair designs are mixed throughout the floors (variations of Egg Chairs, Ball Chairs, and Panton Chairs, for example). The Thos. Moser furniture company designed a chair specifically for use in the library called the Hunt Chair, a variation of the Regent design.

In 2013 the library received an AIA/ALA (American Institute of Architects and American Library Association) Library Building Award.

=== Artwork ===
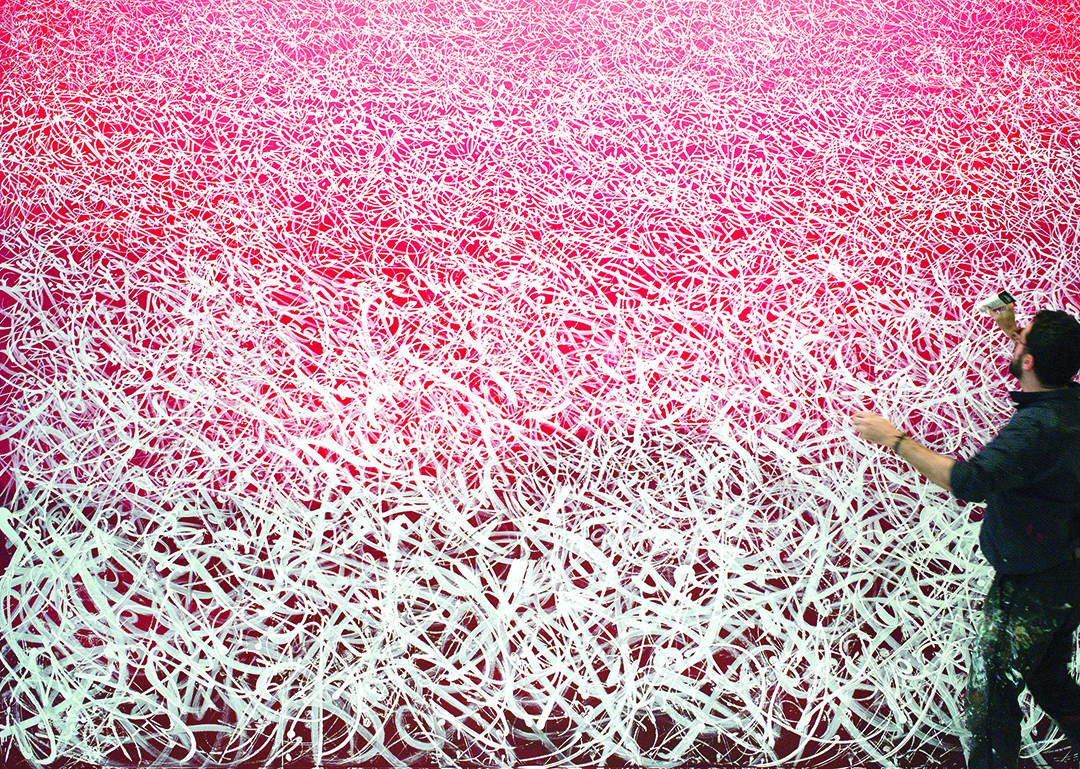
José Parlá painting The Nature of Language in the library

In 2013 the library installed the mural The Nature of Language by contemporary artist José Parlá. The mural was created over the course of five years. Parlá's artwork was inspired by calligraphy. In 2013 José and his brother Rey Parla released a short film documenting the creation of the mural.

== Sustainability ==
The Hunt Library plays a part in NCSU's sustainability plan. 31% of building materials are made from recycled content, most of its wood comes from sustainable forests, and the interior makes extensive use of solar energy and natural light. Additional features include a roof-mounted solar water heater, low-flow fixtures, and a partial green roof. The building is also piped to allow for reclaimed wastewater usage, but this is not yet implemented as of September 2013. The university has expressed an intention to seek a Leadership in Energy and Environmental Design (LEED) Silver environmental rating.

In April 2013 the Hunt Library received the City of Raleigh Non-Residential Green Design Award "for its sustainable design and technology that reduces energy use by 31 percent."

== Technology ==
Upon its opening, Hunt Library received international attention for its use of advanced technology. The "core" of the university's vision for the Hunt Library is "the ability for our students, faculty, and partners to immerse themselves in interactive computing, multimedia creation, and large-scale visualization." Among its noted features are the robotic book storage and retrieval system, a makerspace, 3D printing, technology-rich study rooms, audio and video production rooms, a video game lab, a teaching and visualization lab, and a technology showcase room demonstrating products such as tablets and Arduino available for lending or use in the library.

In praise of its architecture and technological innovations, the Boston Globe named the Hunt Library one of its "five novel libraries" in April 2013.

=== bookBot book storage and retrieval system ===
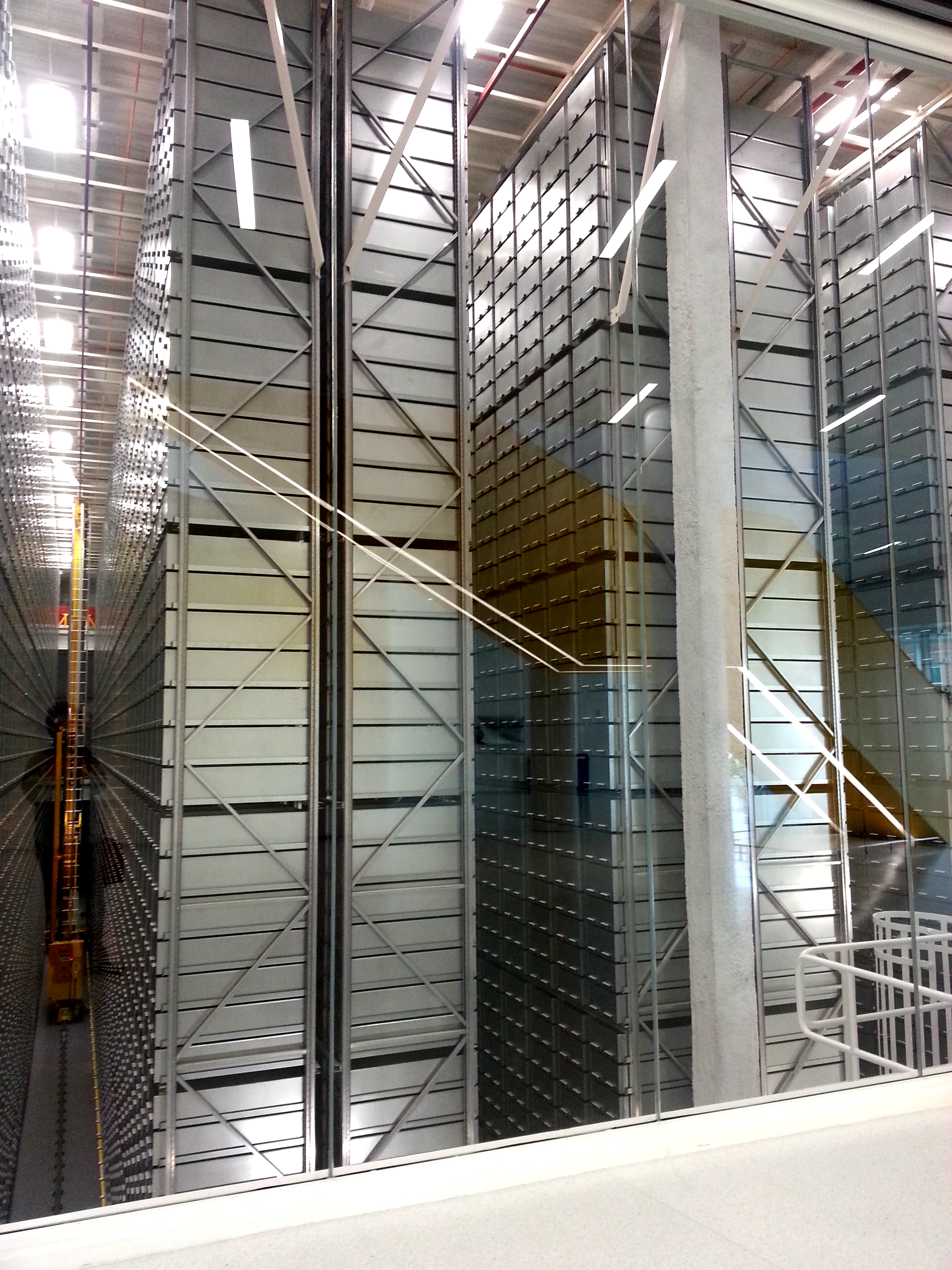
The bookBot as seen from the first floor

The bookBot is the robotic system of book storage and retrieval utilized at the James B. Hunt Jr. Library. The system consists of four 50-foot-tall robots at the center of the book-delivery system that traverse between rows of book bins. The bookBot is able to barcode, sort, and store books (as well as other items) in more than 18,000 bins. Visitors can watch the bookBot retrieve materials through a glass wall on the first floor of the library, called Robot Alley.

Up to two million books can be stored in the bookBot's delivery system. Compared to storing books on traditional shelves, the delivery system can store the same number of books while only using 1/9 the size of that. Out of approximately 25 American academic libraries, the bookBot system in the James B. Hunt Jr. Library is the only one in North Carolina.

Students and library patrons do not have direct physical access to bookBot, accessing collections instead using pre-existing browsing and borrowing features of the libraries' website. A virtual browse tool aims to replicate the aid to discovery that physical library shelves provide by presenting sets of adjacently indexed titles.

=== Makerspace ===
The Hunt Library makerspace currently features a 3D scanner and two 3D printers available for use for a fee. There is also a laser cutter in the Makerspace

=== Game Lab ===
The Game Lab is dedicated to both the academic study of digital games and recreational gaming. It is available for casual use when not reserved by faculty or graduate students.

The space is surrounded by "smart glass" that can be frosted by pressing a button. The lab features flexible, ergonomic seating, a Christie MicroTiles display wall touch-enabled for up to 20 simultaneous touches and a custom 8-foot gaming bridge console with a 20" AMX Modero X touch panel for room control. The lab is further equipped with a Sennheiser K-array 5.1 surround sound system with BiAmp AudiaFlex audio processing, a custom, liquid-cooled game server with dual NVIDIA GTX 690 graphics cards and with an overclocked Intel i7 quad-core processor with 256 GB SSD, 32 GB memory and 10Ge Ethernet. Gamers have access to a Mac Pro game and visualization server, three fixed consoles (an Xbox One, a PlayStation 4 and a Wii U), a Samsung Blu-ray disc player, Apple TV, Cisco digital media player, Vista Spyder Video Wall Processor, Extron XTP Crosspoint matrix switcher and three mobile game carts with Xbox, PlayStation 3 and Wii.

=== Video walls ===
There are four large video walls built into the public spaces around the Hunt Library and a fifth in the Game Lab. The ultra high-definition displays are made with Christie MicroTiles technology and range in size from 3.2 to 6.5 meters wide. The walls are used to showcase the work of faculty and students.

The Libraries also curates work for the video walls through their Code+Art program, which invites students to create visualizations for the digital spaces that blur the line between computational thinking and design thinking. The Code+Art program features data visualizations, generative art, procedurally generated environments, and animated GIFs.

== Awards and accolades ==
- "Place" Award at Innovation and Economic Prosperity University Awards - Association of Public and Land-grant Universities - November 2014
- One of "five novel libraries" - The Boston Globe - April 2013
- City of Raleigh - Residential Green Design Award - April 2013
- 2014 Stanford Prize for Innovation in Research Libraries
- "The 16 coolest College Libraries in the Country" - Business Insider - April 2014
- "Library of the Future" - Time Magazine - June 2013
- 2013 AIA / ALA Library Building Award - American Institute of Architects and American Library Association

== See also ==
- D.H. Hill Library
