= The Brickyard (NC State) =

Coordinates: 35°47′14″N 78°40′13″W

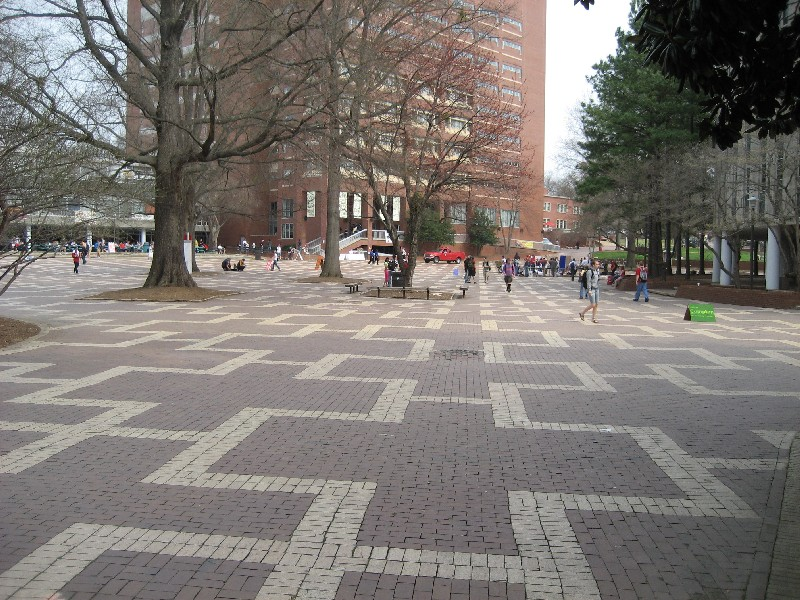
Students walking across the Brickyard with D.H. Hill Library in background

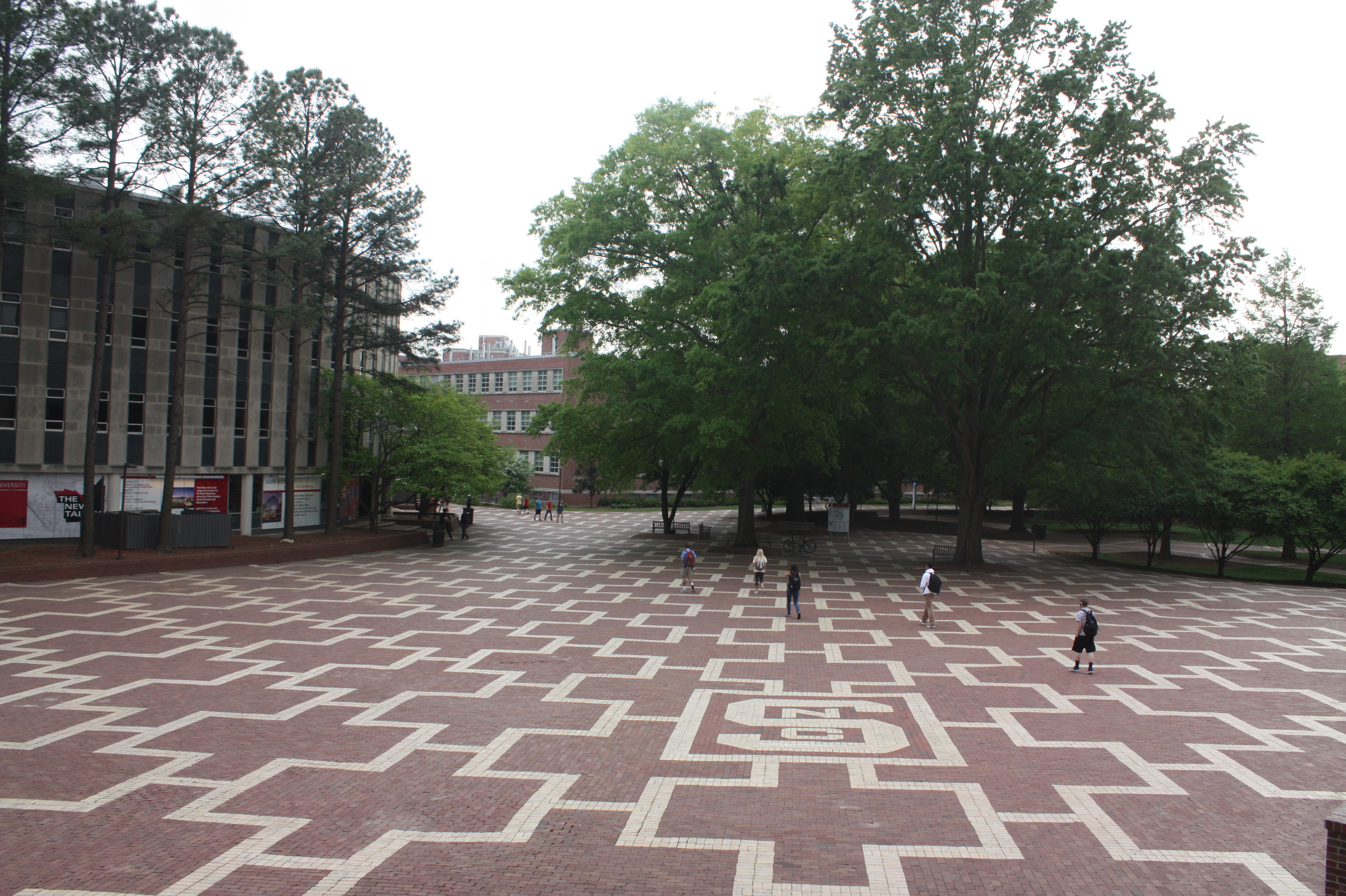
Brickyard

University Plaza, or more commonly The Brickyard, is a public plaza at the heart of North Carolina State University's North Campus in Raleigh, North Carolina. It is the university's most active court and has been the site of numerous special events, including concerts, memorials, campaign rallies and political protests.

== Details ==
The plaza, conceived of and designed by landscape architect Richard C. Bell, FASLA, with a state-appropriated budget of $160,000, is mostly covered with red and white bricks which have been organized into a decorative mosaic reminiscent of Piazza San Marco in Venice, where Bell once studied. There are two main green areas on the plaza, one on the east side and one on the west.

The east green area features two concrete chairs which serve as parabolic reflectors, amplifying and focusing sound waves so that someone sitting in one chair can easily hear the person in the other chair from a far distance. Harrelson Hall, a cylindrical classroom building was previously located on the southwest corner of the plaza, but was deconstructed and recycled in 2017. D. H. Hill Library is located on the north side of the Brickyard.

The Brickyard consists of 588,060 red and white North Carolina bricks, most of which were donated by the North Carolina Bricklayers Association in 1966. Bell's original design called for large granite cobblestones that paved the campus walking areas from the University Plaza to the Memorial Tower.

== Special events ==
- The Brickyard was officially dedicated by Chancellor John Caldwell and former Chancellor Carey Bostian, chair of the historic names committee, on March 7, 1968, on the 81st anniversary of Founder's Day.
- The first concert on the complete Brickyard was the three-day All Campus Weekend, with featured performers Little Anthony and the Imperials and the Royal Guardsmen.
- Through the years, several Brickyard preachers have held court on the Brickyard, evangelizing and proselytizing to students as they walk to and from class and two and from lunch at the Atrium, which is located on the ground floor of the Erdahl-Cloyd Wing of the D.H. Hill Library.
- Many university-sponsored events take place on the Brickyard, including the annual Habitat for Humanity Shack-a-thon. Shacks are built on the Brickyard and viewed by students, as well as the public, as a fundraiser for the campus chapter of Habitat for Humanity. This is an annual event that takes place every autumn.
- The Stanley Cup made an appearance on the plaza on December 4, 2006. Students were able to touch the cup and take pictures with the cup. Its appearance followed the Carolina Hurricanes's 2006 Stanley Cup Championship win, which was won at Raleigh's RBC Center.
- A prototype NASA Crew Return Vehicle once made an appearance on the Brickyard. Speeches were given beside it.
- North Carolina State University's Earth Day celebration occurs on the Friday before April 22 each year. The event highlights the environmental research and outreach efforts of NC State students, staff, and faculty. North Carolina State University's 2007 event featured over 60 exhibitors, making it one of the larger Earth Day events in the Triangle area.
- Every Wednesday the North Carolina Farmers' Market comes to the Brickyard.
