= NCBioImpact =

Group of biotechnology training organizations in North Carolina, U.S.

NCBioImpact is a group of organizations in the U.S. state of North Carolina created to enhance the trained workforce for biotechnology and other life science employers by educating students and retraining incumbent workers. The partnership works to promote economic development in North Carolina while offering comprehensive biomanufacturing training and education programs located at two universities in the University of North Carolina System and the North Carolina Community College System.

== History ==
In 2002, biomanufacturing executives in the Research Triangle region in North Carolina, working with NCBIO, asked the North Carolina Biotechnology Center to conduct a study of the workforce and training needs of the industry. "Window on the Workplace 2003" was published the following year.

As a result of that study, a partnership among industry, government, academic leaders and nonprofits, such as the North Carolina Biotechnology Center and NCBIO, submitted a proposal to provide unique training to increase the number of workers to the Golden LEAF Foundation. Equipment and construction funds were provided for three initiatives, which now receive part of their operating funds from the North Carolina General Assembly, along with contracts, grants and training fees.

A 2010 Battelle report commissioned by the North Carolina Biotechnology Center found that almost 47,000 biotechnology-related (direct and indirect) jobs were added during the period of 2008-2010, bringing the total jobs in North Carolina to almost 227,000 and annual compensation and benefits increased nearly $3.3 Billion. The president of the North Carolina Biosciences Organization (NCBIO), the trade association for North Carolina's life science community, stated "NCBioImpact makes it possible for companies growing or relocating to North Carolina to bring new facilities and new workers on-line in substantially shortened timelines with better quality outcomes and higher productivity." As an example, two major companies, Novartis and Merck & Co. located facilities in North Carolina after considering all factors, including the hands-on training programs offered by the university and community college systems.

== BioNetwork ==
The program offers continuing education, workforce development, business services and outreach activities for startup companies. The seven BioNetwork centers are located throughout the state in order to provide specialized life science training where it is needed. BioNetwork offers training in the following centers:

- Capstone Center and Validation Academy
- Bioprocessing Center
- Pharmaceutical Center
- National Center for Biotechnology Workforce
- BioAgriculture Center
- Learning Solutions Center
- BioBusiness Center

== BTEC ==
The Golden LEAF Biomanufacturing Training and Education Center (BTEC) is located on the Centennial Campus at North Carolina State University. BTEC offers many programs, including graduate and undergraduate education, workforce training, and bioprocess and analytical services. It operates several pilot-scale bioprocessing laboratories that simulate the production of biological products according to Good Manufacturing Practice (cGMP) expectations.

The facility is home to the first cross-disciplinary Master's in Biomanufacturing program in the United States, which offers education in advanced biomanufacturing, business coursework taught by the Jenkins Graduate College of Management, and professional development courses. The center also offers an undergraduate minor for NC State students and a post-baccalaureate certificate for non-degree students. Professional development courses are offered to individuals or can be customized for industry partners.

BTEC has trained investigators from the Food and Drug Administration (FDA) in bioprocessing methods, analytical techniques, and aseptic manufacturing. BTEC has also trained influenza vaccine manufacturing employees from around the world as part of a contract with the Biomedical Advanced Research and Development Authority (BARDA). The goal of the training is to increase influenza vaccine production capacity around the world and in developing countries. BTEC also offers analytical testing and development services for the biopharmaceutical industry, government and academia for preparation for preclinical trials and commercialization.

== BRITE ==
Located on the campus of North Carolina Central University, the Biomanufacturing Research Institute and Technology Enterprise (BRITE) prepares undergraduate and graduate students for scientific careers in the biomanufacturing and biopharmaceutical industries. BRITE's 52,000 sq. ft. research and teaching facility provides hands-on training in process and analytical technology, drug discovery and biomanufacturing. Students can pursue undergraduate and graduate degrees in the classroom and gain hands-on experience in laboratories.

BRITE also offers short courses for incumbent biotechnology workers and potential industry employees. The facility also includes a 350,000 compound library, which was provided by Biogen Idec.
