= Biomanufacturing =

Type of manufacturing

Biomanufacturing (or bioproduction) is a type of manufacturing or biotechnology that utilizes biological systems to produce commercially important biomaterials and biomolecules for use in medicines, food and beverage processing, and industrial applications. Biomanufacturing products are recovered from natural sources, such as blood, or from cultures of microbes, animal cells, or plant cells grown in specialized equipment. The cells used during the production may have been naturally occurring or derived using genetic engineering techniques.

== Products ==
There are thousands of biomanufacturing products on the market today. Some examples of general classes are listed below:

=== Medicine ===
- Amino acids
- Biopharmaceuticals
- Cytokines
- Fusion proteins
- Growth factors
- Monoclonal antibodies
- Vaccines

=== Food and beverage ===
- Amino acids
- Enzymes
- Protein supplements

=== Industrial applications that employ cells and/or enzymes ===
- Biocementation
- Bioremediation
- Detergents
- Plastics

== Unit operations ==
A partial listing of unit operations utilized during biomanufacturing includes the following:

- Blood plasma fractionation
- Cell culture
- Cell separation, such as filtration and centrifugation
- Fermentation
- Homogenization
- Column chromatography
- Ultrafiltration and/or diafiltration
- Clarification, such as filtration
- Formulation
- Filling vials or syringes for injected medicines

== Equipment and facilities ==
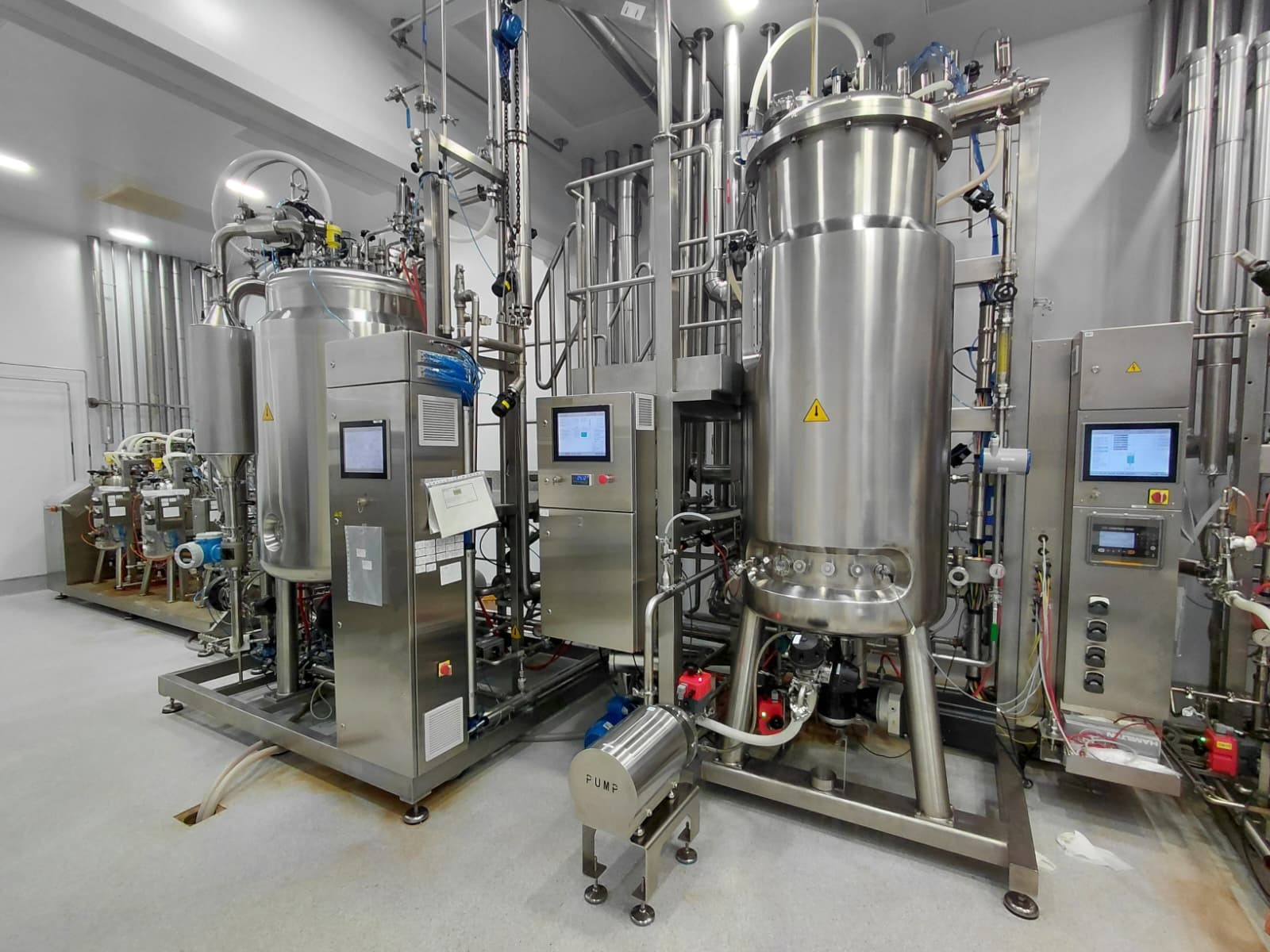
Stainless Steel Bioreactors

Equipment and facility requirements are dictated by the product(s) being manufactured. Process equipment is typically constructed of stainless steel or plastic. Stainless steel equipment can be cleaned and reused. Some plastic equipment is disposed of after a single use.

Products manufactured for medical or food use must be produced in facilities designed and operated according to Good Manufacturing Practice (GMP) regulations. Cleanrooms are often required to control the levels of particulates and microorganisms. Sterilization and aseptic processing equipment are required for production of injectable products.

== Employment ==
Skilled professionals are required for positions throughout the life cycle of a biomanufacturing product, which includes:

- Research
- Product development
- Process development
- Preclinical evaluation
- Clinical trials
- Engineering
- Production
- Supply Chain Management
- Validation
- Quality Control
- Quality Assurance
- Materials Management
- Sales

Details for some of these positions are listed in “The Model Employee,” published by the North Carolina Biotechnology Center. In addition, the North Carolina Association for Biomedical Research (NCABR) maintains the website About Bioscience that offers free online videos on various careers.

== Education and training ==
Several academic institutions have developed curricula and built facilities to provide education and training in biomanufacturing to students from community colleges, universities, and/or industry. NCBioImpact, established in 2004, is an example of a comprehensive state-wide training network. Member institutions Golden LEAF Biomanufacturing Training and Education Center (BTEC) at North Carolina State University, (BRITE) at North Carolina Central University, and North Carolina Community College System's BioNetwork operate multidisciplinary centers dedicated to workforce development for the biomanufacturing industry.

MiraCosta College and Solano College in California developed the first Bachelor of Science degree in biomanufacturing. The degree is largely lab-based and is built on a contextualized science and statistics backbone. The upper division classes recognize the unique environment of biological production where the process sciences and technology thrive in partnership with quality and regulatory compliance.
