= Golden LEAF Biomanufacturing Training and Education Center =

Instructional Center in North Carolina, U.S.

- Abbreviation: BTEC
- Founded at: North Carolina State University
- Type: multidisciplinary instructional center
- Purpose: biomanufacturing

The Golden LEAF Biomanufacturing Training and Education Center (BTEC) is a multidisciplinary instructional center at North Carolina State University that provides education and training to develop skilled professionals for the biomanufacturing industry. Biomanufacturing refers to the use of living organisms or other biological material to produce commercially viable products. Examples include therapeutic proteins, monoclonal antibodies, and vaccines for medical use; amino acids and enzymes for food manufacturing; and biofuels and biochemicals for industrial applications. BTEC provides hands-on education and training in bioprocessing concepts and biomanufacturing methods that comply with cGMP (current Good Manufacturing Practice), a set regulations published by the United States Food and Drug Administration (FDA).

BTEC reports administratively through the university's College of Engineering and is guided by an advisory board made up of representatives from the biomanufacturing industry and other organizations interested in biotechnology and biomanufacturing.

In 2003, North Carolina's Golden LEAF Foundation provided almost $39 million to build BTEC, as part of a larger grant to establish a statewide public-private partnership now called NCBioImpact. The state of North Carolina provided funds for process equipment and supports the operation of the facility. The NCBioImpact partnership now includes BTEC, BRITE (Biomanufacturing Research Institute and Technology Enterprise) at North Carolina Central University, North Carolina BioNetwork of the North Carolina Community College System, NCBIO (North Carolina Biosciences Organization), the North Carolina Biotechnology Center, and the Golden LEAF Foundation. It was created to provide workforce training and development for the biotechnology industry, thereby fostering the growth of this economic sector in the state. According to the North Carolina Biotechnology Center, North Carolina is home to 528 biotechnology companies that provide 57,000 jobs and $1.92 billion in taxes for state and local government. Employment in the industry has grown 4.1% from 2008 to 2010, when other industries shed thousands of jobs. In recent years some of the world's largest pharmaceutical companies, e.g. Novartis and Merck & Co, have located and/or expanded manufacturing operations in North Carolina.

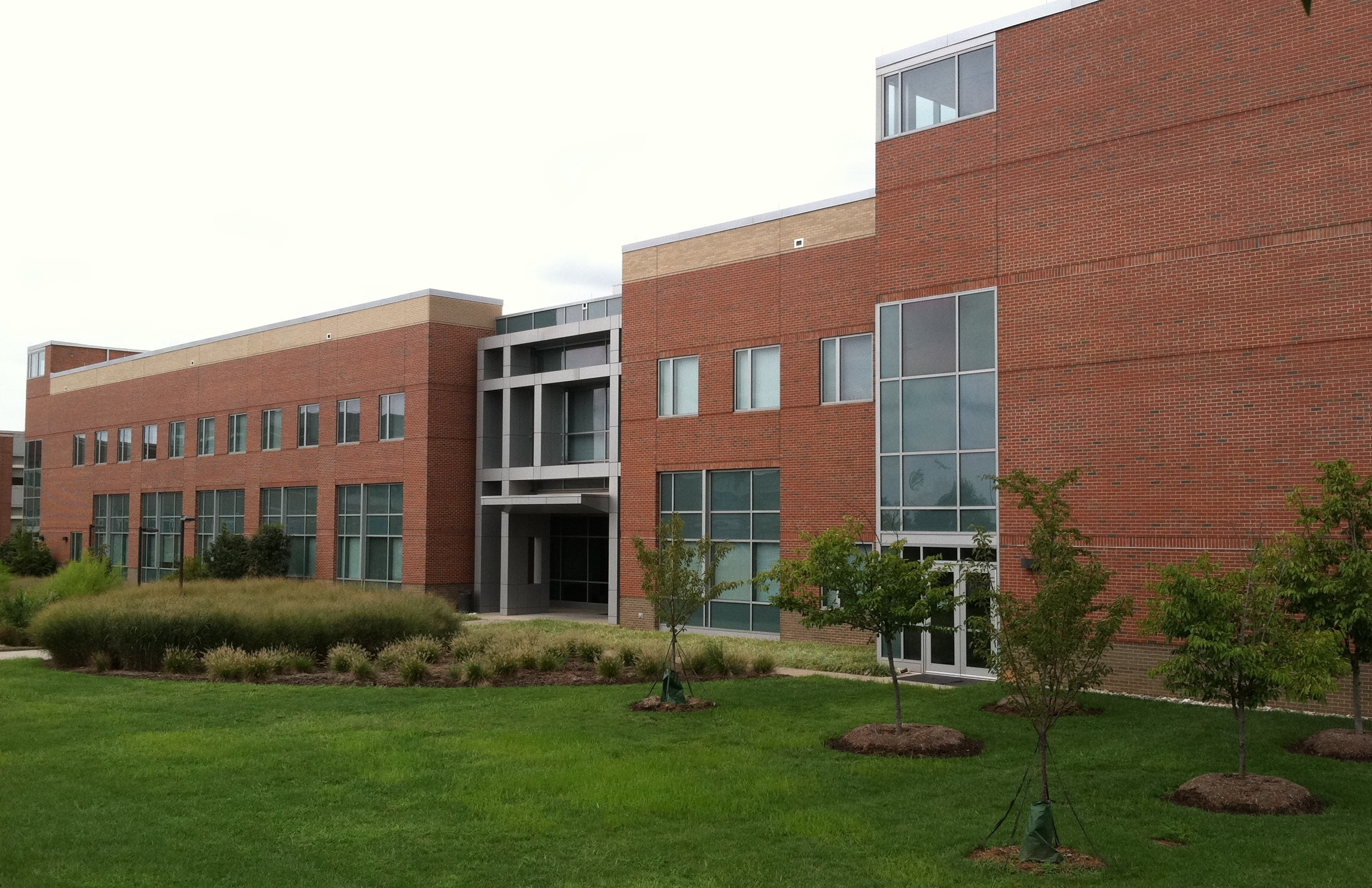
BTEC Facility

== Facilities and equipment ==
BTEC opened in fall 2007 and was the first facility dedicated to biomanufacturing training. BTEC is 82,500 gross square feet and contains 63,000-gross square feet of laboratories, which range from small or bench scale to large-scale suites that simulate a biomanufacturing pilot plant capable of producing biopharmaceutical products. Upstream processes utilize bacteria, yeast, animal cells, and insect cells. Equipment in these spaces includes the following:

- Bioreactors, glass and stainless steel (2L - 300L) and disposable (10L - 250L)
- Automation systems with distributed control architecture
- Downstream recovery and purification equipment, and
- Analytical instrumentation

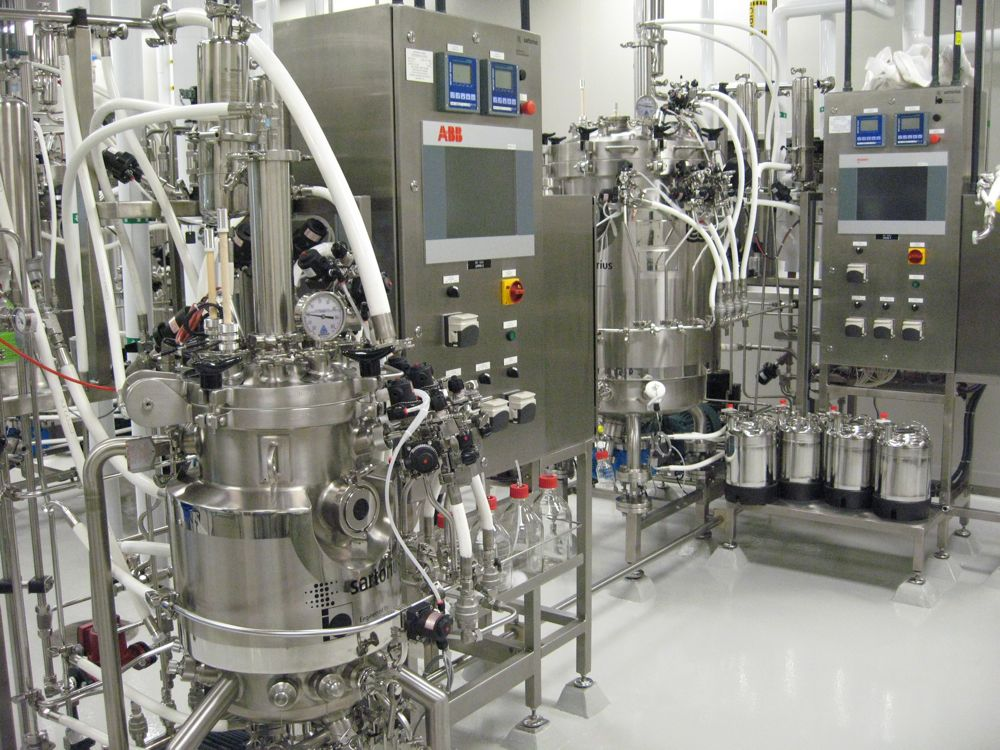
Bioreactors in BTEC's Simulated GMP Lab

The main BTEC facility is home to the North Carolina Community College System's BioNetwork Capstone Center, which operates an aseptic processing/filling suite and several bench-scale labs. In 2012, BTEC completed construction of additional laboratories in a nearby facility for cell culture, purification, and processing of active virus.

== University programs ==
BTEC delivers undergraduate and graduate courses to North Carolina State University students. Academic programs include the following:

- undergraduate certificate
- undergraduate minor
- post-baccalaureate certificate
- graduate minor
- a master's program offering two Professional Science Master's degrees, a Master of Science in Biomanufacturing (MS) and a Master of Biomanufacturing (MR)

Curriculum was created with extensive input from industry professionals, and most courses include substantial hands-on laboratory work. Most BTEC courses are offered in a half-semester (eight-week) format, which enables students to complete a series of courses in one academic year.

== Job training ==
BTEC collaborates with industry partners to design, develop and deliver courses that provide professionals working for biomanufacturing companies, equipment vendors, or regulatory agencies with continuing education opportunities. Open-enrollment courses are offered throughout the year and are available to all interested parties. BTEC also regularly delivers courses customized to meet a client's specific needs for training.

BTEC provides biomanufacturing training specified in contracts of grants to provide training for government agencies. In 2007, the FDA awarded BTEC a 5-year contract to develop and deliver biomanufacturing training for FDA inspectors. In 2010, BTEC received a grant for almost $900,000 from Biomedical Advanced Research and Development Authority (BARDA), part of the United States Department of Health and Human Services. With funding from this grant, a team of instructors from BTEC, Duke University, and industry provide a three-week course on influenza vaccine manufacturing. Trainees were selected by institutions participating in a U.S. government-sponsored program to build vaccine production capacity among countries with developing economies. Countries represented included Egypt, India, Indonesia, Mexico, Romania, Serbia, Russia, South Korea, Thailand, and Vietnam.

== Bioprocess and analytical services ==
When laboratories are not being used for training, BTEC uses them to perform a variety of services for scientists from industry, government, and academia. Projects involve technology development, process improvement/scale-up, analytical testing, and preparation of material for preclinical studies. These services allow scientists to advance their research projects toward commercialization. In turn, these advancements stimulate the North Carolina economy.

== Location ==
BTEC is located on the Centennial Campus of North Carolina State University in Raleigh, North Carolina, United States. The campus is approximately 15 miles east of Research Triangle Park and Raleigh-Durham International Airport.

== Advisory board ==
Name	Title	Organization
Marcelo Anderson	Senior Director, Global Head Strategic Partnerships	Biogen
Gray Armstrong	Senior Director of Operations	Pfizer
John Balchunas	Assistant Director, Professional Development Programs	NC State BTEC
Ruben Carbonnel	BTEC Distinguished Fellow	NC State BTEC
