= Fairlife =

Ultra-filtered milk brand

fairlife
- Type: Lactose-free milk
- Manufacturer: fairlife, LLC (The Coca-Cola Company)
- Origin: United States, Chicago, Illinois
- Introduced: February 2014; 12 years ago
- Color: Deep blue Light blue White
- Variants: Reduced fat milk; Fat-free milk; Whole milk; Chocolate milk; Strawberry milk
- Related products: Core Power
- Website: www.fairlife.com

fairlife, stylized as fa!rlife, is an American brand of ultra-filtered milk distributed by The Coca-Cola Company. In the United States, the milk comes in five varieties: reduced fat, chocolate, strawberry, fat-free, and whole milk.

== History ==
In 2012, fairlife, LLC was formed when Select Milk Producers entered into a partnership with The Coca-Cola Company. The brand first appeared in Minnesota, where it launched in February 2014.

Later, in February 2015, The Coca-Cola Company officially launched fairlife, and began to distribute the milk across the United States. fairlife is marketed as an ultra-filtered milk, as well as "a dairy option that is sourced from sustainable family farms."

== Manufacturing and filtration process ==
fairlife's first U.S. production facility opened in 2013 in Coopersville, Michigan. In 2021, the company opened a production facility in Goodyear, Arizona. fairlife and The Coca-Cola Company have invested in production capacity to meet demand for fairlife products. A facility in Webster, New York, began production in 2026. In 2026, the company also began expanding its Coopersville, Michigan, facility to add two production lines, with construction expected to be completed in early 2028. In Canada, fairlife owns a dairy facility in Peterborough, Ontario.

Anders Porter of fairlife's Coopersville, Michigan, facility stated, "we separate the cream, filter, heat treat, homogenize, test and bottle the milk." According to Sue McCloskey, who developed the system used to make fairlife with her husband Mike McCloskey, the ultrafiltration process removes the lactose and much of the sugar and leaves behind more of the protein and calcium. fairlife is labeled as ultra-filtered milk.

== Product range and variants ==
All fairlife products are gluten-free and lactose-free and are made without artificial growth hormones (rBST). While they avoid rBST, fairlife notes that the FDA has found no significant difference in milk from treated versus untreated cows. fairlife’s product range includes:

- fairlife ultra-filtered milk
- Core Power protein shakes
- fairlife Nutrition Plan nutrition shakes

=== fairlife ultra-filtered milk ===
The 52oz fairlife ultra-filtered milk is available in 3 different milk types:

- Whole milk
- Reduced fat milk
- Fat-free milk

It contains 50% more protein and 50% less sugar compared to regular milk. fairlife also offers reduced fat chocolate ultra-filtered milk.

=== Core Power protein shakes ===
Core Power protein shakes are made with ultra-filtered milk and are designed to support post-workout recovery by fighting fatigue and dehydration.

Core Power protein shakes come in two protein options; 26g and 42g, with both options providing electrolytes. Flavors for 26 g include:

- Vanilla
- Chocolate
- Strawberry

Core Power 42g flavors include:

- Vanilla
- Chocolate
- Strawberry

=== Nutrition Plan ===
In 2019, fairlife introduced Nutrition Plan, a nutrition shake with 30g of protein, 2g of sugar, and 150 calories. Its current flavor offerings are chocolate and vanilla.

=== Discontinued products ===
In January 2020, the company added a range of coffee creamers to its lineup with four flavor options: regular, Hazelnut, Vanilla, and Caramel. The coffee creamer was discontinued in 2021. In 2021, fairlife also announced the retirement of its Good Moo’d milk to optimize production on top-selling products. In July 2020, fairlife also added ice cream to its lineup, with seven flavor options: vanilla, chocolate, cookies & cream, chocolate peanut butter, double fudge brownie, java chip and mint chip. The ice cream line was discontinued in 2023.

== Distribution and pricing ==
fairlife is owned by The Coca-Cola Company.

In regard to Coca-Cola's strategy for fairlife, the company's North America President Sandy Douglas stated, "Our vision for the nutrition beverage business and the milk product that I showed you which is made on a sustainable dairy with fully sustainable high-care processes with animals, has a proprietary milk filtering process that allows you to increase protein by 50 percent, take sugar down by 30 percent, and have no lactose, and a milk that's premiumised and taste better and we'll charge twice as much for it as the milk we're used to buying in a jug." The cost of fairlife is indeed, roughly twice as high as conventional milk; fairlife's national average price in the US is $4.29 per 52 oz., compared to the national average pricing of conventional milk at $2 per 64 oz.

== Reception ==
Following its widespread launch in February 2015, Khushbu Shah of Eater.com wrote that overall reviews of the milk were mixed, although the chocolate variety, in particular, was generally well received.

Dietitians and nutritionists were generally critical of the milk; Alissa Rumsey, a spokesperson for the Academy of Nutrition and Dietetics expressed, "When you really look at the numbers, it can sound appealing, but in general most Americans are already getting enough protein," adding, "If you need more, eat an egg or a handful of almonds. And people who need more calcium should up their intake of dark leafy greens, not the so-called Frankenmilk." Registered dietitian Keri Gans claimed, "milk is already a great package of nutrients; I’m not quite sure why it needs to be changed," and commented on the removal of sugar in fairlife milk with, "I never looked at the sugar in milk as a problem." Meredith Engel of New York Daily News speculated that, "it’s clear why Coke is trying to get into the milk business: More and more Americans are turning away from sugary soft drinks, and soda sales fell to a 19-year-low in 2013." Men's Health nutrition advisor Mike Roussell, however advised his clients to switch over to fairlife's milk.

Hayley Peterson of Business Insider wrote, "The chocolate milk was the crowd favorite. It's very sweet, but not overpowering, and the consistency is creamier and thicker than regular milk." Peterson adds that, "most people agreed that the 2% milk tasted similar to whole milk. Many reviewers loved the milky taste, while others thought it was too overpowering." Sam Rega, a Business Insider video producer commented, "Both skim and 2% had an after-taste, but otherwise I couldn't tell much of a difference from this and regular milk."

While Chris Plante of The Verge commented, "to my surprise, Fairlife tastes, well, like milk. It looks and feels a little thicker than traditional milk, and has a slightly richer taste, especially the chocolate milk, which sits on the spectrum between chocolate shake and milk that's stewed on a lazy Saturday morning in a bowl of Cocoa Puffs," he criticized the aftertaste, stating, "Fairlife's aftertaste is less appealing. A few minutes sipping a cup of chocolate Fairlife and then a cup of 2% Fairlife, the inside of my mouth had that malty feel that chases a protein shake." Rachel Sanders of BuzzFeed observed, "Fairlife is a little bit creepy to drink. The texture is much more viscous and thick than regular milk, and the odor is really strong, to the point that it smells almost spoiled. It tastes OK, but has a slightly musky flavor that reminds me of shelf-stable or reconstituted milk."

In 2024, Food and Wine described fairlife as "making real dairy cool again," with the publication's Merlyn Miller noting the milk's taste and utility for consumers seeking additional protein or lactose-free options.

Registered dietitian Lauren Manaker, writing for Eat This, Not That in 2024, highlighted fairlife protein shakes as "an excellent source of protein" for muscle building and maintenance, noting that the ultra-filtered milk process yields higher protein concentration than regular milk. She also observed that the inclusion of lactase enzyme makes the products accessible to lactose-intolerant consumers.

fairlife products have performed well in comparative taste evaluations. In 2023, Sporked rated the chocolate milk 9.5 out of 10, describing it as "extremely good" with balanced sweetness and creaminess. Bon Appétit called fairlife shakes "the most delicious of the bunch" in a protein shake comparison. EatingWell named Core Power the best-tasting protein shake at Costco, praising its smooth texture as free of the chalkiness common to protein products.

== Market presence and expansion ==
In 2022, fairlife surpassed $1 billion in annual retail sales and became the top-selling brand in the dairy category on Instacart. Food Navigator described the company as "a value-added success story in a category that has been in steady decline for years," noting that the ultra-filtered milk pioneer had reached a quarter of U.S. households.

During Coca-Cola's 2024 year-end earnings call, CEO James Quincey noted that fairlife's retail value had grown from $10 million in 2014 to nearly $4 billion in 2024. That same year, Dairy Foods ranked fairlife as the 17th-largest U.S. dairy processor by total sales. This growth coincided with a broader resurgence in milk consumption; whole milk sales rose 3.2% in 2024. The New York Times attributed the shift to changing consumer priorities around hydration, protein, and healthy fats. Axios reported that sales of lactose-free and lactose-reduced dairy milk grew approximately 14% year over year, driving dairy's overall recovery.

Newsweek named fairlife the most trusted high-protein milk brand in the United States in both 2025 and 2026 as part of its annual Most Trusted Awards, which are based on a survey of more than 29,000 American shoppers.

fairlife products are available at major U.S. and Canadian grocery stores and retailers including Amazon, Costco, Dollar General, Sam's Club, Target, Walgreens, and Walmart, as well as through delivery services such as Instacart and DoorDash. Core Power multipacks are also sold directly through the company's website.

== Controversies ==
=== Advertising ===
In November 2014, an advertising campaign for the brand featuring pin-up girls covered in milk, with the taglines on the ads claiming the milk contained "50% more protein & calcium," was launched in the brand's Minneapolis and Denver test markets. Business Insider reported that some Twitter users criticized the advertisements. Laura Bates of The Guardian criticized the ads, claiming they sexualized women for commercial purposes and noting, "seeing these images of women’s bodies being used, once again, to advertise an unrelated consumer product ('Drink what she’s wearing') is a tedious reminder that when it comes to the objectification of women in advertising, we seem to be slipping backward instead of moving forward." Chris Plante of The Verge commented, "at worst the ad is selling consumers on the idea of drinking ultra-filtered milk off an ultra-sexualized woman, and at worst it's selling you 2% part milk. The remaining Fairlife ads are equal parts awkward and demeaning." Plante, however, adds,"otherwise Fairlife has honed its pitch as a healthy, natural dairy product," mentioning the brand's marketing sheet.

=== Animal welfare ===
On June 4, 2019, the animal protection organization Animal Recovery Mission (ARM) released a video of an undercover dairy investigation into Fair Oaks Farms in Fair Oaks, Indiana. During the investigation, farm employees were observed slapping, kicking, punching, pushing, throwing and slamming calves; calves were stabbed and beaten with steel rebars, hit in the mouth and face with hard plastic milking bottles, kneed in the spine, burned in the face with hot branding irons. This resulted in extreme pain and suffering by the calves, and in some cases permanent injury and even death. ARM confirmed that male calves from Fair Oaks Farms are in fact transported to veal farms (Midwest Veal and Calf Start), despite the corporation's claims that it does not send its male calves to veal farms. In addition, the ARM investigator captured footage of drug use. The four Fair Oaks Farms employees including the ARM employee were fired a few months before the video was released and at least three retailers including Jewel-Osco announced they would remove all fairlife products from their shelves.

Indiana state Senator Travis Holdman, who sponsored Indiana's ag-gag bill, claimed that the video was "politically motivated", which ARM vigorously denied and prompted the group to release extended footage. The political controversy deepened as Newton County Prosecutor Jeff Drinski released a statement indicating that the ARM investigator encouraged or coerced the farm employees to abuse the animals. ARM's founder, Richard Couto, rebuked the statement and said that his organization has not been contacted by the prosecutors office, which he says is a red flag given ARM has worked with law enforcement agencies in other abuse investigations. "There is no reason the prosecutor shouldn’t be calling me and/or a witness to be interviewed yet," he said. A binder detailing ARM's investigation along with video footage were provided to the Newton County Sheriff's Office the same day the video was released to the public.

While fairlife claimed to stop sourcing milk from Fair Oaks Farms after the 2019 incident, in 2023, an undercover ARM investigation tracked shipments from Windy Ridge Dairy and Windy Too Dairy — part of Fair Oaks Farms — to a fairlife tank in Coopersville, Michigan. fairlife claimed that only a single shipment was delivered and that it was not used in any products.

In February 2025, ARM released video footage from a 2024 investigation into fairlife suppliers Rainbow Valley Dairy and Butterfield Dairy. The footage showed cattle beaten and electric-shocked, premature separation of calves from their mothers, and sick and injured cows suffering. In response, fairlife issued a statement saying they would no longer source from these dairies. However, a class-action lawsuit submitted in 2025 includes video and still-image evidence that fairlife continued to receive supply from these dairies, claiming fairlife switched to nighttime transportation to conceal this. The lawsuit calls the 2024 footage the "worst, most widespread, egregious, systemic, frequent, and extreme cruelty and neglect yet."

fairlife has invested approximately $30 million in its animal welfare program, which was established in late 2019. The company’s 2023 Stewardship Report noted that all fairlife supplier farms undergo regular third-party audits. The 2023 FARM Awards also rewarded fairlife’s supplier farms for excellence in animal welfare and environmental stewardship.

=== Humanewashing ===
fairlife has been criticized by journalists, advocacy groups, and plaintiffs in consumer litigation for engaging in humanewashing.

Following public revelations about animal abuse at farms in its supply network, fairlife and its parent company, The Coca-Cola Company, faced multiple class-action lawsuits alleging deceptive advertising. Plaintiffs argued that fairlife’s animal welfare messaging led consumers to pay premium prices under the belief that the milk was produced according to higher ethical standards than conventional dairy. In 2022, Coca-Cola, fairlife, and other defendants agreed to a $21 million settlement to resolve these claims.

Despite a post-law suit pledge to strengthen animal care programs and processes, fairlife has removed humane care claims from its labeling, and in 2025, it took down a "lengthy yet vague web page about its animal welfare commitments."
