= Membrane filtration of dairy =

Milk protein concentrate separated out from pressurized filtration

In the dairy industry, membrane filtration (diafiltration) is commonly used to separate milk into different components. By passing milk under pressure through a thin, porous membrane, its components are separated according to size. Four general categories of filtration are used: microfiltration (0.1–10 μm, > 10^{6}Da), which generally only removes bacteria, spores, and other larger particles; ultrafiltration (10^{3}–10^{6} Da), which also removes protein and fat molecules; nanofiltration, which also removes lactose and larger mineral ions such as calcium; and reverse osmosis, which lets only water through.

== Microfiltration ==
Microfiltration removes cells (bacteria, spores) and other larger particles (e.g. casein globules, fat droplets). As a result, it is used for:

Microfiltered milk
Microfiltration at 0.8–1.2 μm removes microbes more completely than pasteurization does and results in a milk with a longer shelf life. Because it is performed at a cold or warm (up to 55 °C (131 °F)) temperature, it does not result in the "cooked" flavor like in UHT milk. This kind of liquid milk is sold in Canada, Europe and China, among other countries/regions.
In 2023, it was found that bacteria of the genus Microbacterium pass through microfilters and become a major part of the remaining microbes in the resultant milk. This bacterium also survives high-temperature, short-time (HTST) pasteurization.
Casein separation
Microfiltration is also used to separate fat and casein particles from milk, both of which are excellent for cheesemaking. (If a simple casein concentrate is desired, the milk is skimmed first, producing a kind of milk protein concentrate.) The remaining portion is functionally the same as whey and contains the milk serum proteins.

== Ultrafiltration ==
Ultrafiltration is also used to select for fats and proteins while letting the smaller lactose, water, mineral, and vitamin molecules to pass through the membrane. It produces the following products

Diafiltered milk
Also called ultrafiltered milk (UF milk) in the US, this is produced by passing skim milk through a membrane until the retained side consists of more than 40% protein. It has the consistency of coconut milk. It is a kind of milk protein concentrate and is used in cheesemaking.
Consumer UF milk
Consumer-grade "ultrafiltered milk" combines different grades of filtration to individually separate out different components of milk: fat, protein, lactose, minerals, water, then recombine and homogenize them. As a result the nutritional content can be tuned. Fairlife and Simply Smart (discontinued in May 2022) sell 2% UF milk blended for higher protein content, lower sugar (lactose) content, and creamier taste.

== Nanofiltration and reverse osmosis ==
Reverse osmosis is used to concentrate milk prior to transportation.

Nanofiltration can be used to remove lactose from whey; finer filters also remove milk minerals, which consists of the non-monovalent mineral ions such as calcium. Milk minerals is primarily calcium phosphate and is used as a natural nutritional additive.

Nanofiltration and reverse osmosis are both used to concentrate the dilute fluids that have passed through nano- and ultra-filtration. Both are also used to remove water from milk protein concentrate and milk protein isolate.
