= Golden LEAF Foundation =

Nonprofit that funds businesses in North Carolina, U.S.

- Formation: 1999; 27 years ago
- Purpose: Economic development
- Headquarters: Rocky Mount, North Carolina
- Methods: Grantmaking
- President and CEO: Scott T. Hamilton
- Website: goldenleaf.org

The Golden LEAF Foundation is a nonprofit corporation based in Rocky Mount, North Carolina in the United States, that was created in 1999 to receive half of the funds coming to North Carolina from the master settlement agreement with cigarette manufacturers. The mission of the foundation is to increase economic opportunity in North Carolina’s rural, tobacco-dependent, and economically distressed communities through leadership in grantmaking, collaboration, innovation, and stewardship as an independent and perpetual foundation. Golden LEAF works in partnership with local governments, educational institutions, economic development organizations and other public agencies, and nonprofits to achieve this goal.

Golden LEAF's funding is focused on the following priorities: agriculture, job creation and economic investment, and workforce preparedness.

The foundation's 15-member board is appointed by the governor of North Carolina, the president pro tem of the state senate, and the speaker of the North Carolina House.

== Key people ==
The current president and CEO is Scott T. Hamilton.. Other staff can be found at goldenleaf.org/about/staff/.

Current board members can be found at goldenleaf.org/about/board/.

== Select projects ==
1. One of Golden LEAF's earliest grants was to Surry Community College to begin programs in viticulture and enology, essentials of winemaking. Within a few years the region that encompasses Yadkin, Surry, Forsyth, Davie, and Davidson counties would become known as the Yadkin Valley wine region. Land previously used to raise tobacco is now producing wine grapes for sale to privately owned wineries and for the wine cooperative for which Golden LEAF provided the seed money. In 2005, Golden LEAF continued to help the wine industry grow and improve by making grants to market the region and to provide equipment to help owners detect and control diseases and maintain quality.
2. The Golden LEAF Biomanufacturing Training and Education Center (BTEC) on North Carolina State University's Centennial Campus opened in 2007, giving the state a new tool for supporting a growing biotechnology industry. BTEC is the largest facility of its kind in the nation. Through partnerships between NC State, North Carolina Central University (NCCU) and the North Carolina Community College System, BTEC's distance education and on-site programs will train as many as 2,000 students and prospective employees per year. BTEC will simulate a biomanufacturing pilot plant facility capable of producing biopharmaceutical products and packaging them in a sterile environment. It also will include training and education classrooms, laboratories, building and process utilities. The facility is outfitted so that students will gain hands-on experience using the same large-scale equipment they would use on the job. Golden LEAF provided about $38 million to design, build and equip BTEC, as part of a larger grant of almost $68 million to establish a statewide public-private partnership now called NCBioImpact. In addition to BTEC, the initiative establishes biomanufacturing training capabilities statewide at NCCU and five regional skill centers of the North Carolina BioNetwork within the North Carolina Community College System, which will operate the BioNetwork Capstone Center within BTEC.
3. Golden LEAF, in conjunction with the U.S. Navy, Cherry Point MCAS, the Defense Logistics Agency and other interested DoD agencies, state educational institutions, and North Carolina companies, assisted in creation of the North Carolina-Aerospace Alliance to assist entrepreneurs in three areas: certification and engineering, work-force training and access to capital. Golden LEAF made $11 million in grants available to support training and the development of capabilities targeting replacement parts for aging military aircraft and other defense related contracting opportunities.
4. The foundation recently approved spending $100 million for a new manufacturing plant at North Carolina's Global TransPark (GTP) to be built by Spirit AeroSystems that will eventually employ more than 1,000 people. Spirit said it will invest $570 million in the project over the next six years and that the facility, which will manufacture the center portion of the fuselage of the Airbus A350 Xtra WideBody airplane, will be operational by 2010. State grants totaling about $125 million include a $5 million grant and more than $20 million, payable over 12 years, tied to the job creation.
5. The Golden LEAF Foundation also provides scholarships to the colleges in the University of North Carolina system, the North Carolina Community College System, and the North Carolina Independent Colleges and Universities.
6. In February 2020, The Golden LEAF Board of Directors approved $2.975 million to support hurricane recovery efforts and job creation projects for several North Carolina counties.

== Tobacco settlement ==
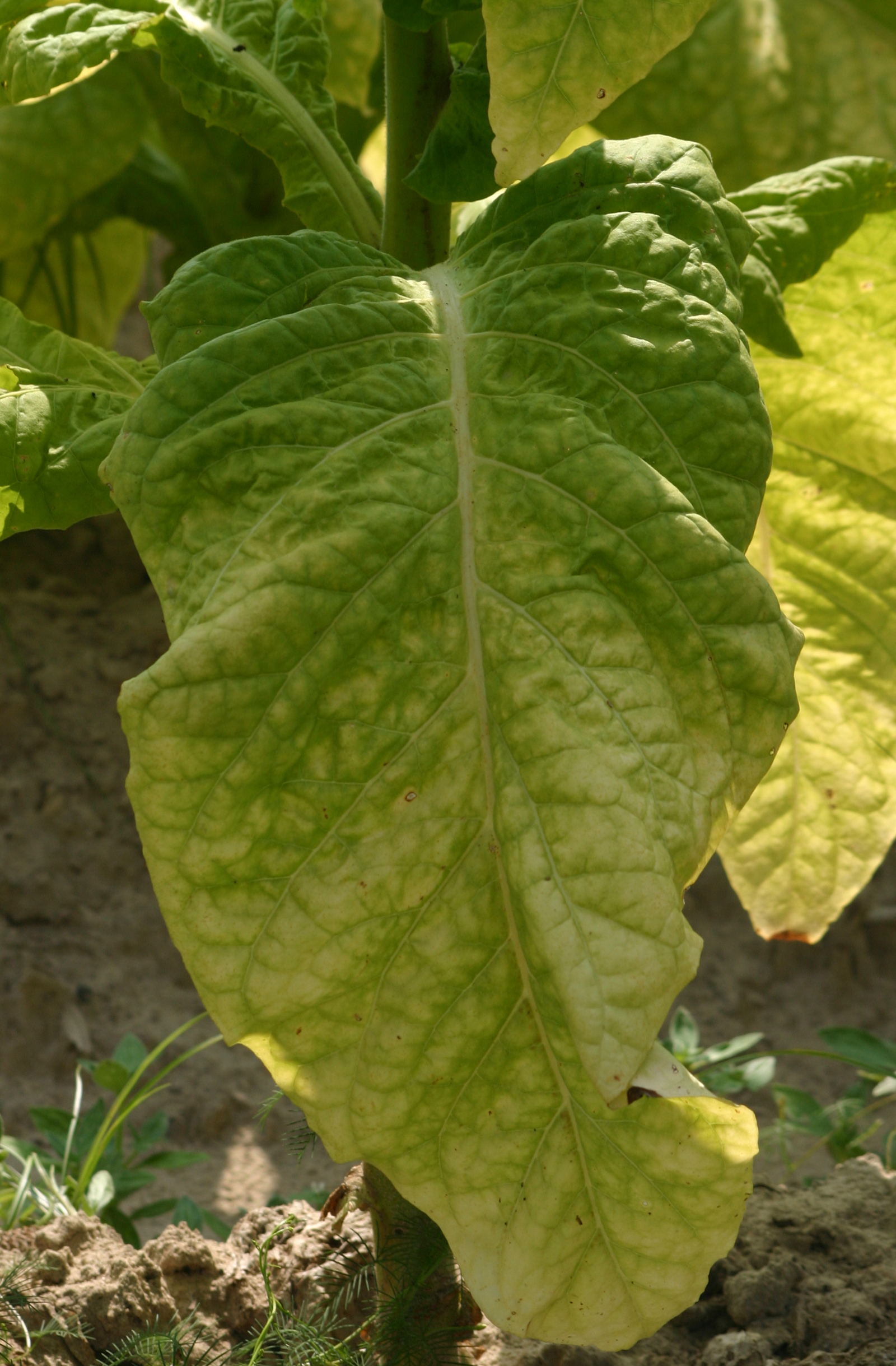
Brightleaf tobacco leaf ready for harvest. When it turns yellow-green the sugar content is at its peak, and it will cure to a deep golden color with mild taste.

In November 1998, the attorneys general of 46 states signed an agreement with four of the nation's largest cigarette manufacturers. This settlement is referred to as the Master Settlement Agreement (MSA). The MSA commits these tobacco manufacturers to pay approximately $206 billion to the 46 states over the first 25 years of the agreement. Of that, North Carolina's share is estimated to be approximately $4.6 billion after 25 years. Money from the MSA is sometimes called "Phase I" money.

The N.C. General Assembly created three different programs to distribute the State's Phase I funds. The Golden LEAF Foundation, so named because the tobacco plant has golden leaves after they have been cured, receives 50% of the Phase I funds and makes grants for economic development in tobacco dependent communities. The Health and Wellness Trust Fund, a former State agency, received 25% of the Phase I funds and made grants for health-related programs. The remaining 25% is allocated to the Tobacco Trust Fund Commission.

== See also ==
- Tobacco industry
