= Milk protein concentrate =

Concentrated milk product of 40-90% milk protein

Milk protein concentrate (MPC) is any type of concentrated milk product that contains 40–90% milk protein, typically from cow milk. The United States officially defines MPC as "any complete milk protein (casein plus lactalbumin) concentrate that is 40 percent or more protein by weight." In addition to ultrafiltered milk products, the MPC classification includes concentrates made through other processes, such as blending nonfat dry milk with highly concentrated proteins, such as casein.

== Processing ==
To make milk protein concentrate, whole milk is first separated into cream and skim milk. The skim milk is then fractionated using ultrafiltration to make a skim concentrate that is lactose-reduced. This process separates milk components according to their molecular size. Milk then passes through a membrane that allows some of the lactose, minerals, and water to cross through. The casein and whey proteins, however, will not pass through the membrane due to their larger molecular size. The proteins, lactose, and minerals that do not go through the membrane are then spray dried. Spray drying and evaporation further concentrate the remaining materials to form a powder. Depending on the purpose of the final product, different heat treatments can be used to process ultrafiltered or blended varieties of MPC. An MPC product processed with low heat will maintain higher nutritional value.

== Functionality in food ==
Applications of MPC include: use in nutritional beverages, nutritional and dietary products, aged care products, infant formulas, protein bars, yogurts, recombined cheeses, cultured products, frozen desserts, bakery and confection applications. MPC can be financially advantageous to producers of milk for cheese production, as its addition increases the protein level of the product achieving greater cheese yield for less capital investment.

MPC contains micellar casein, whey proteins, and bioactive proteins in the same ratio found in milk. As the protein content of MPC increases, the lactose levels decrease. This high-protein low-lactose ratio makes MPC an appealing ingredient for protein-fortified beverages and foods and low-carbohydrate foods.

MPC can make products more heat stable, and it can provide solubility and dispersibility when used. This solubility makes MPCs beneficial in dairy-based mixes. MPC is useful in foaming and whipping. The proteins in MPC act at air/water interface to form a stable film of air bubbles. This stabilizes meringues, mousses, cakes, ice creams, whipped cream and soufflés. The proteins in MPC act at the oil/water interface to form and stabilize fat emulsions in sausages and other processed meats, dairy drinks, soups, vinaigerettes, sauces and bakery products. Essential in many of its applications, an MPC can increase the viscosity of a food product due to its interior protein structure. The lactose and proteins in MPC undergo Maillard browning, resulting in an appealing color for bakery products such as pastries, cakes and muffins. Because MPC has virtually no taste, it allows the other flavors of a food to fully develop.

== Impact on the United States ==
In 2002, the FDA issued a Warning Letter to Kraft Foods that Kraft Singles and Velveeta were being sold with packaging that described it as a "Pasteurized Process Cheese" and "Pasteurized Process Cheese Spread" respectively, which the FDA claimed were misbranded because the products declared milk protein concentrate (MPC) in its ingredients listing. Both products are now sold in the US as a "Pasteurized Prepared Cheese Product", a term for which the FDA does not maintain a standard of identity, and which therefore may contain MPC.

In the US dairy farmers are protected from international competitors with a range of measures, including tariffs on imports. MPCs however are not subject to a tariff rate quota, so most MPCs used are imported. US dairy producer groups claim that foreign manufacturers using nonfat dry milk in the production of MPC are circumventing existing quotas on nonfat dry milk.
