= Claude McKinney =

Claude E. McKinney (June 9, 1929, in Greensboro, North Carolina – November 11, 2008, in Raleigh, North Carolina) was a chief contributor to the design of Research Triangle Park and was dean of the North Carolina State University School of Design from 1973 to 1988. He was also the planner and director of the university's Centennial Campus. He died from Progressive supranuclear palsy.

== Education ==
McKinney graduated with honours from Pfeiffer Junior College (now Pfeiffer University) in Misenheimer, North Carolina. In 1951 he graduated from the University of North Carolina with a degree in painting and design, later doing graduate work in the same subjects at UNC.
