= College of Management =

College of Management may refer to:

== India ==
- College of Defence Management, India
- SIES College of Management Studies (SIESCOMS), Mumbai, India

== U.S. ==
- Eller College of Management, of the University of Arizona, US
- Georgia Institute of Technology College of Management, US
- Jenkins Graduate College of Management of North Carolina State University, US

== Elsewhere ==
- American College of Management and Technology, Dubrovnik, Croatia
- Army Public College of Management Sciences, Rawalpindi, Pakistan
- College of Healthcare Management, Fukuoka, Japan
- College of Management Academic Studies, Rishon LeZion, Israel
- College of Management in Trenčín, Slovakia
- College of Management, Mahidol University, Bangkok, Thailand
- Diwan College of Management, Taiwan
- Holmes Institute, Australia
- International College of Management, Sydney, Australia
- Kathmandu College of Management, Nepal
- The Management College, former name of Henley Business School, England
