= Jenkins Graduate College of Management =

Coordinates: 35.7881°N 78.6737°W

The Jenkins Graduate School of Management is the graduate program at North Carolina State University. It is part of NC State's College of Management and is located in Raleigh, North Carolina, part of North Carolina's Research Triangle Park.

== History ==
On September 21, 2007, the graduate programs in North Carolina State University's College of Management were brought under one name - the Jenkins Graduate School of Management. The programs were named in honor of Benjamin (Ben) P. Jenkins, III, a 1968 graduate of the university and vice-chairman and president of the General Bank at Wachovia Corporation.

- 1992 College established
- 2002 MBA Program established
- 2006 College opens Research Triangle Park site for part-time MBA Program
- 2007 Jenkins Graduate School of Management Named within the College of Management

== Academics ==
Business school rankings

U.S. MBA Rankings
- Bloomberg (2026): 57

The College of Management's undergraduate and graduate business programs are accredited by AACSB International. The Jenkins Graduate School includes the Master of Accounting and Master of Business Administration programs in the NC State College of Management, and the Graduate Economics Program offered jointly by NC State's colleges of agriculture and life sciences and management.

- Master of Accounting: One-year program, Full-Time and Part-Time
- Master of Business Administration: Full-Time & Part-Time MBA, main campus & Research Triangle Park locations
- Master of Global Innovation Management
- Economics Graduate programs: Degree options offered jointly with NC State's College of Agricultural and Life Sciences:
  - Ph.D. in Economics
  - Master of Economics
  - M.A. in Economics
  - M.S. in Agricultural and Resource Economics
  - Accelerated Bachelor's-Master's Degree Program
