= North Carolina State University College of Engineering =

Engineering school in Raleigh, North Carolina, US

North Carolina State University's College of Engineering (CoE) is the flagship college of engineering in the state of North Carolina and the largest college at North Carolina State University in terms of enrollment, followed by CHASS, with 9 core departments and 3 affiliated departments offering 18 bachelor's, 17 master's and 13 doctoral degrees. The College is the fourth largest college of engineering in the nation. The college's Engineering Online has one of the largest enrollments of any online engineering program in the U.S. and is consistently listed as a "Best Value" in online engineering education by GetEducated.com.

== Departments ==
The college has the following departments:

- Biological and Agricultural Engineering
- Biomedical Engineering
- Chemical and Biomolecular Engineering
- Civil, Construction, and Environmental Engineering
- Computer Science
- Electrical and Computer Engineering
- Industrial and Systems Engineering
- Integrated Manufacturing Systems Engineering
- Materials Science and Engineering
- Mechanical and Aerospace Engineering
- Nuclear Engineering
- Operations Research
- Forest Biomaterials (Formerly: Wood and Paper Science)
- Textile Engineering

== Majors ==
The majors that the College offers include:

- Aerospace Engineering (AE)
- Biological Engineering (BAE)
- Biomedical Engineering (BME)
- Chemical Engineering (CHE)
- Civil Engineering (CE)
- Computer Engineering (CPE)
- Computer Science (CSC)
- Construction Engineering (CON)
- Electrical Engineering (EE)
- Environmental Engineering (ENE)
- Industrial Engineering (IE)
- Materials Science & Engineering (MSE)
- Mechanical Engineering (ME)
- Nuclear Engineering (NE)
- Paper Science & Engineering (PSE)
- Textile Engineering (TE)
