= Ultrafiltration =

Filtration by force through a semipermeable membrane

Ultrafiltration (UF) is a variety of membrane filtration in which forces such as pressure or concentration gradients lead to a separation through a semipermeable membrane. Suspended solids and solutes of high molecular weight are retained in the so-called retentate, while water and low molecular weight solutes pass through the membrane in the permeate (filtrate). This separation process is used in industry and research for purifying and concentrating macromolecular (10^{3}–10^{6} Da) solutions, especially protein solutions.

Ultrafiltration is not fundamentally different from microfiltration. Both of these are separate based on size exclusion or particle capture. It is fundamentally different from membrane gas separation, which separate based on different amounts of absorption and different rates of diffusion. Ultrafiltration membranes are defined by the molecular weight cut-off (MWCO) of the membrane used. Ultrafiltration is applied in cross-flow or dead-end mode.

== Applications ==
Industries such as chemical and pharmaceutical manufacturing, food and beverage processing, and waste water treatment, employ ultrafiltration in order to recycle flow or add value to later products. Blood dialysis also utilizes ultrafiltration.

=== Drinking water ===
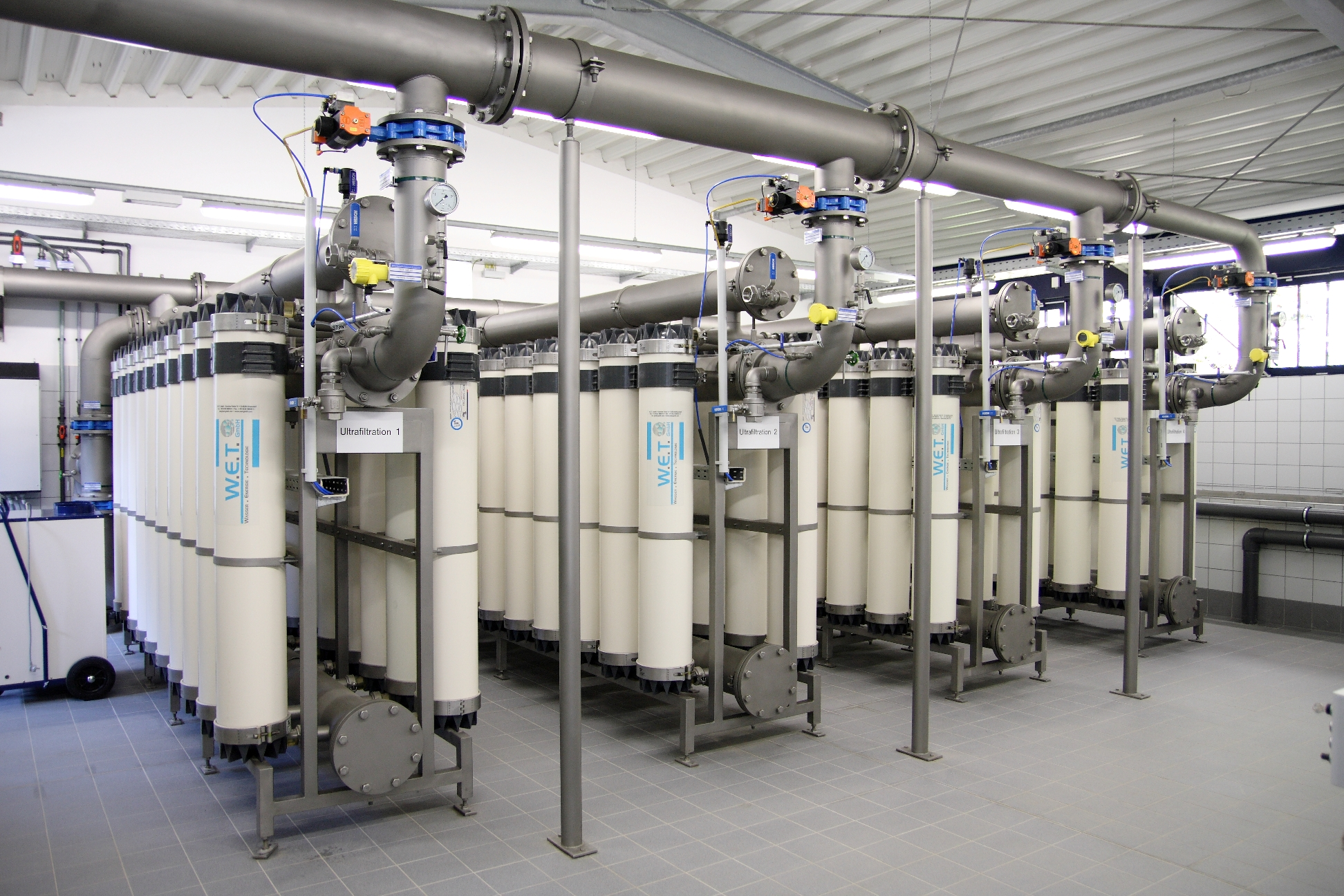
Drinking water treatment 300 m^{3}/h using ultrafiltration in Grundmühle waterworks (Germany)

Ultrafiltration can be used for the removal of particulates and macromolecules from raw water to produce potable water. It has been used to either replace existing secondary (coagulation, flocculation, sedimentation) and tertiary filtration (sand filtration and chlorination) systems employed in water treatment plants or as standalone systems in isolated regions with growing populations. When treating water with high suspended solids, UF is often integrated into the process, utilising primary (screening, flotation, filtration) and some secondary treatments as pre-treatment stages. UF processes are currently preferred over traditional treatment methods for the following reasons:

- No chemicals required (aside from cleaning)
- Constant product quality regardless of feed quality
- Compact plant size
- Capable of exceeding regulatory standards of water quality, achieving 90–100% pathogen removal

UF processes are currently limited by the high cost incurred due to membrane fouling and replacement. Additional pretreatment of feed water is required to prevent excessive damage to the membrane units.

In many cases UF is used for pre filtration in reverse osmosis (RO) plants to protect the RO membranes.

=== Protein concentration ===
UF is used extensively in the dairy industry; particularly in the processing of cheese whey to obtain whey protein concentrate (WPC) and lactose-rich permeate. In a single stage, a UF process is able to concentrate the whey 10–30 times the feed.
The original alternative to membrane filtration of whey was using steam heating followed by drum drying or spray drying. The product of these methods had limited applications due to its granulated texture and insolubility. Existing methods also had inconsistent product composition, high capital and operating costs and due to the excessive heat used in drying would often denature some of the proteins.
Compared to traditional methods, UF processes used for this application:

- Are more energy efficient
- Have consistent product quality, 35–80% protein product depending on operating conditions
- Do not denature proteins as they use moderate operating conditions

The potential for fouling is widely discussed, being identified as a significant contributor to decline in productivity. Cheese whey contains high concentrations of calcium phosphate which can potentially lead to scale deposits on the membrane surface. As a result, substantial pretreatment must be implemented to balance pH and temperature of the feed to maintain solubility of calcium salts.

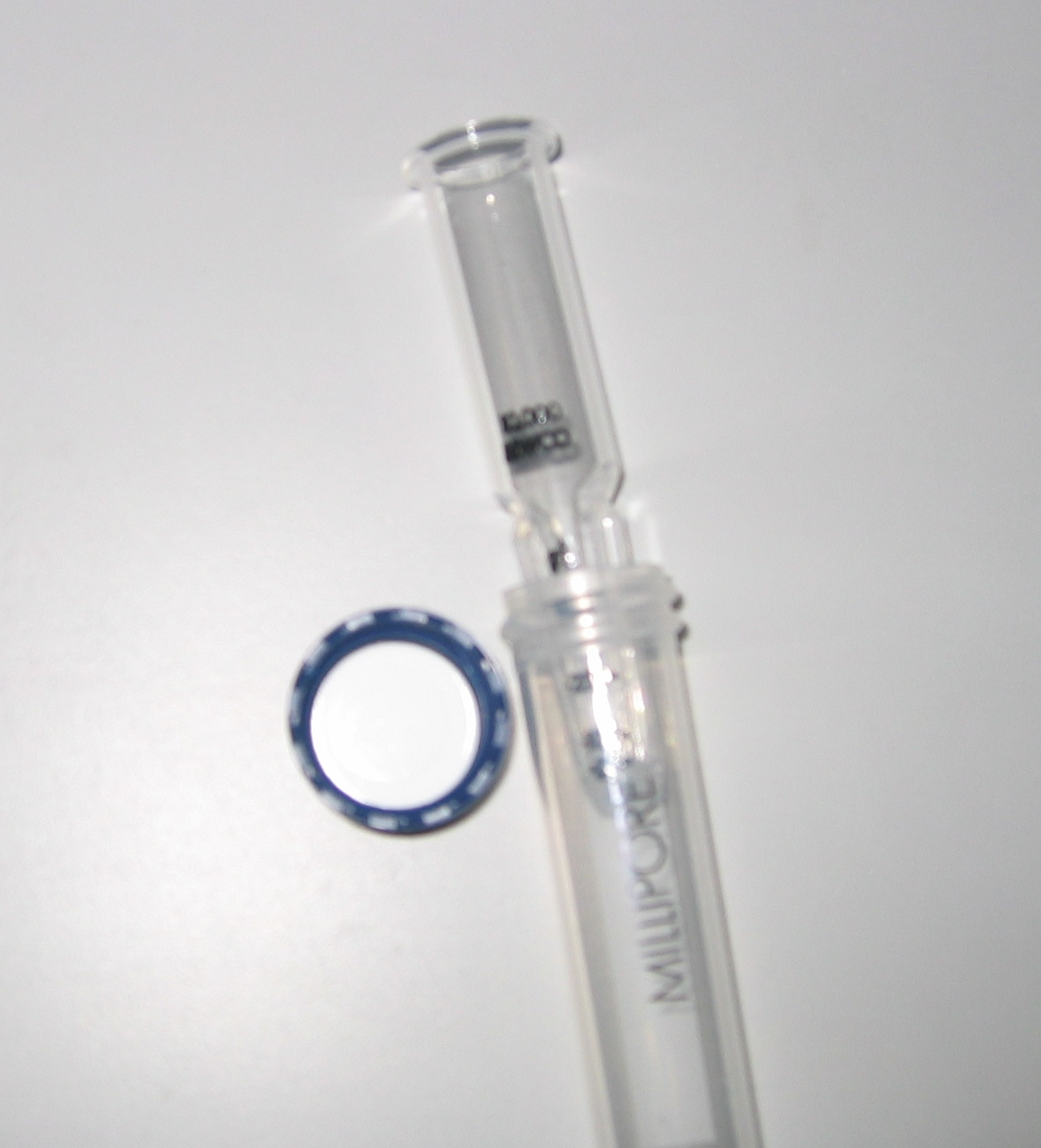
A selectively permeable membrane can be mounted in a centrifuge tube. The buffer is forced through the membrane by centrifugation, leaving the protein in the upper chamber.

=== Other applications ===
- Filtration of effluent from paper pulp mill
- Cheese manufacture, see ultrafiltered milk
- Removal of some bacteria from milk
- Process and waste water treatment
- Enzyme recovery
- Fruit juice concentration and clarification
- Dialysis and other blood treatments
- Desalting and solvent-exchange of proteins (via diafiltration)
- Laboratory grade manufacturing
- Radiocarbon dating of bone collagen
- Recovery of electrodeposition paints
- Treatment of oil and latex emulsions
- Recovery of lignin compounds in spent pulping liquors

Ultrafiltration can also be used to recover valuable compounds from industrial biomass streams. Ultrafiltration of Norway spruce bark-press effluent removed approximately 90% of high-molecular-weight polyphenols while enriching smaller stilbenoids for potential use.

== Principles ==
The basic operating principle of ultrafiltration uses a pressure induced separation of solutes from a solvent through a semi permeable membrane. The relationship between the applied pressure on the solution to be separated and the flux through the membrane is most commonly described by the Darcy equation:

$$J = {\mathrm{TMP} \over \mu R_\mathrm{t}}$$,

where J is the flux (flow rate per membrane area), TMP is the transmembrane pressure (pressure difference between feed and permeate stream), μ is solvent viscosity and R_{t} is the total resistance (sum of membrane and fouling resistance).

== Membrane fouling ==
=== Concentration polarization ===
When filtration occurs the local concentration of rejected material at the membrane surface increases and can become saturated. In UF, increased ion concentration can develop an osmotic pressure on the feed side of the membrane. This reduces the effective TMP of the system, therefore reducing permeation rate. The increase in concentrated layer at the membrane wall decreases the permeate flux, due to increase in resistance which reduces the driving force for solvent to transport through membrane surface. CP affects almost all the available membrane separation processes. In RO, the solutes retained at the membrane layer results in higher osmotic pressure in comparison to the bulk stream concentration. So the higher pressures are required to overcome this osmotic pressure. Concentration polarisation plays a dominant role in ultrafiltration as compared to microfiltration because of the small pore size membrane. Concentration polarization differs from fouling as it has no lasting effects on the membrane itself and can be reversed by relieving the TMP. It does however have a significant effect on many types of fouling.

==== Types of Foulants ====
The following are the four categories by which foulants of UF membranes can be defined in:

- biological substances
- macromolecules
- particulates
- ions

==== Particulate deposition ====
The following models describe the mechanisms of particulate deposition on the membrane surface and in the pores:

- Standard blocking: macromolecules are uniformly deposited on pore walls
- Complete blocking: membrane pore is completely sealed by a macromolecule
- Cake formation: accumulated particles or macromolecules form a fouling layer on the membrane surface, in UF this is also known as a gel layer
- Intermediate blocking: when macromolecules deposit into pores or onto already blocked pores, contributing to cake formation

==== Scaling ====
As a result of concentration polarization at the membrane surface, increased ion concentrations may exceed solubility thresholds and precipitate on the membrane surface. These inorganic salt deposits can block pores causing flux decline, membrane degradation and loss of production. The formation of scale is highly dependent on factors affecting both solubility and concentration polarization including pH, temperature, flow velocity and permeation rate.

==== Biofouling ====
Microorganisms will adhere to the membrane surface forming a gel layer – known as biofilm. The film increases the resistance to flow, acting as an additional barrier to permeation. In spiral-wound modules, blockages formed by biofilm can lead to uneven flow distribution and thus increase the effects of concentration polarization.

== Membrane arrangements ==
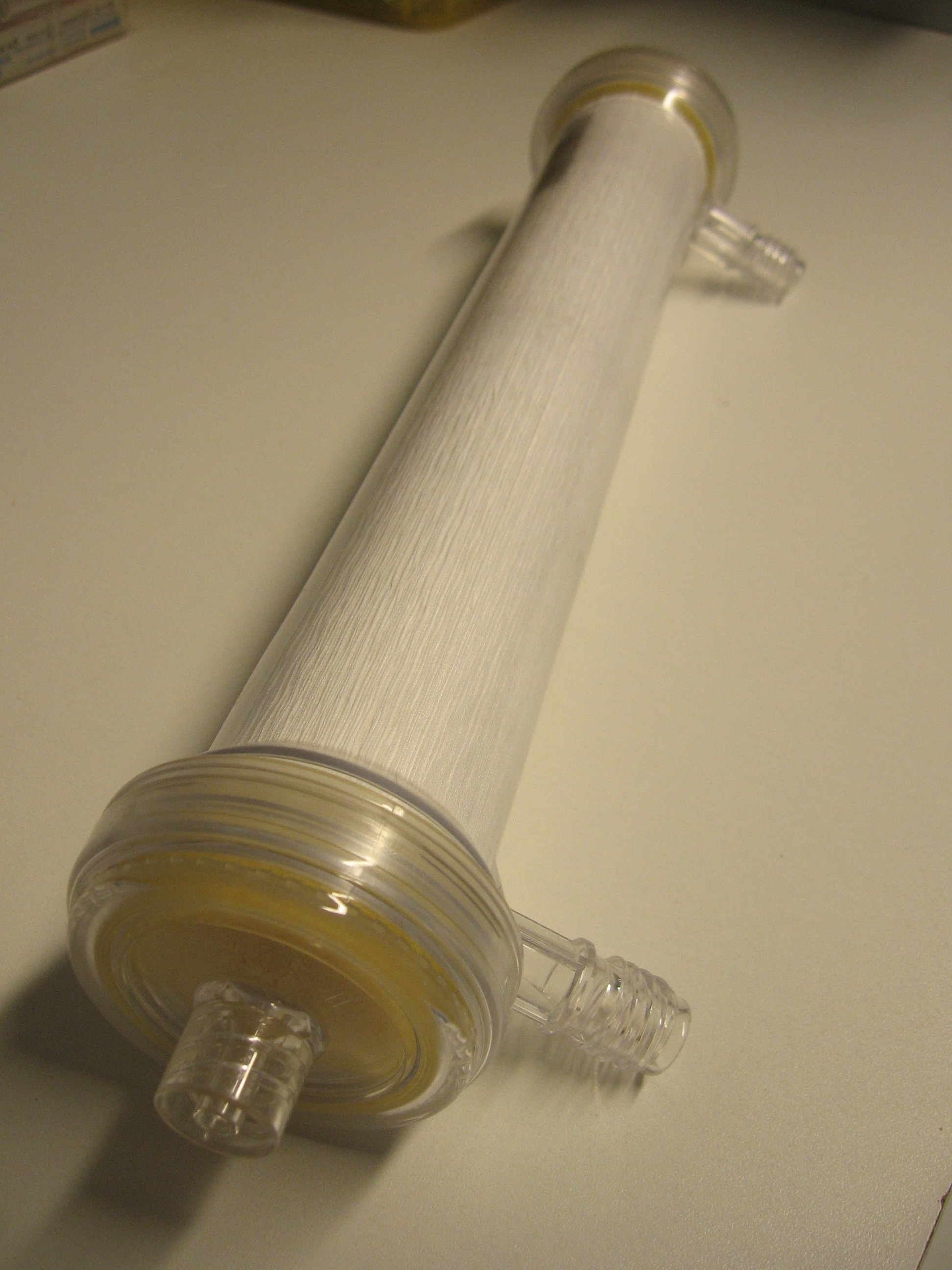
Hollow fibre module

Depending on the shape and material of the membrane, different modules can be used for ultrafiltration process. Commercially available designs in ultrafiltration modules vary according to the required hydrodynamic and economic constraints as well as the mechanical stability of the system under particular operating pressures. The main modules used in industry include:

=== Tubular modules ===
The tubular module design uses polymeric membranes cast on the inside of plastic or porous paper components with diameters typically in the range of 5–25 mm with lengths from 0.6–6.4 m. Multiple tubes are housed in a PVC or steel shell. The feed of the module is passed through the tubes, accommodating radial transfer of permeate to the shell side. This design allows for easy cleaning however the main drawback is its low permeability, high volume hold-up within the membrane and low packing density.

=== Hollow fibre ===
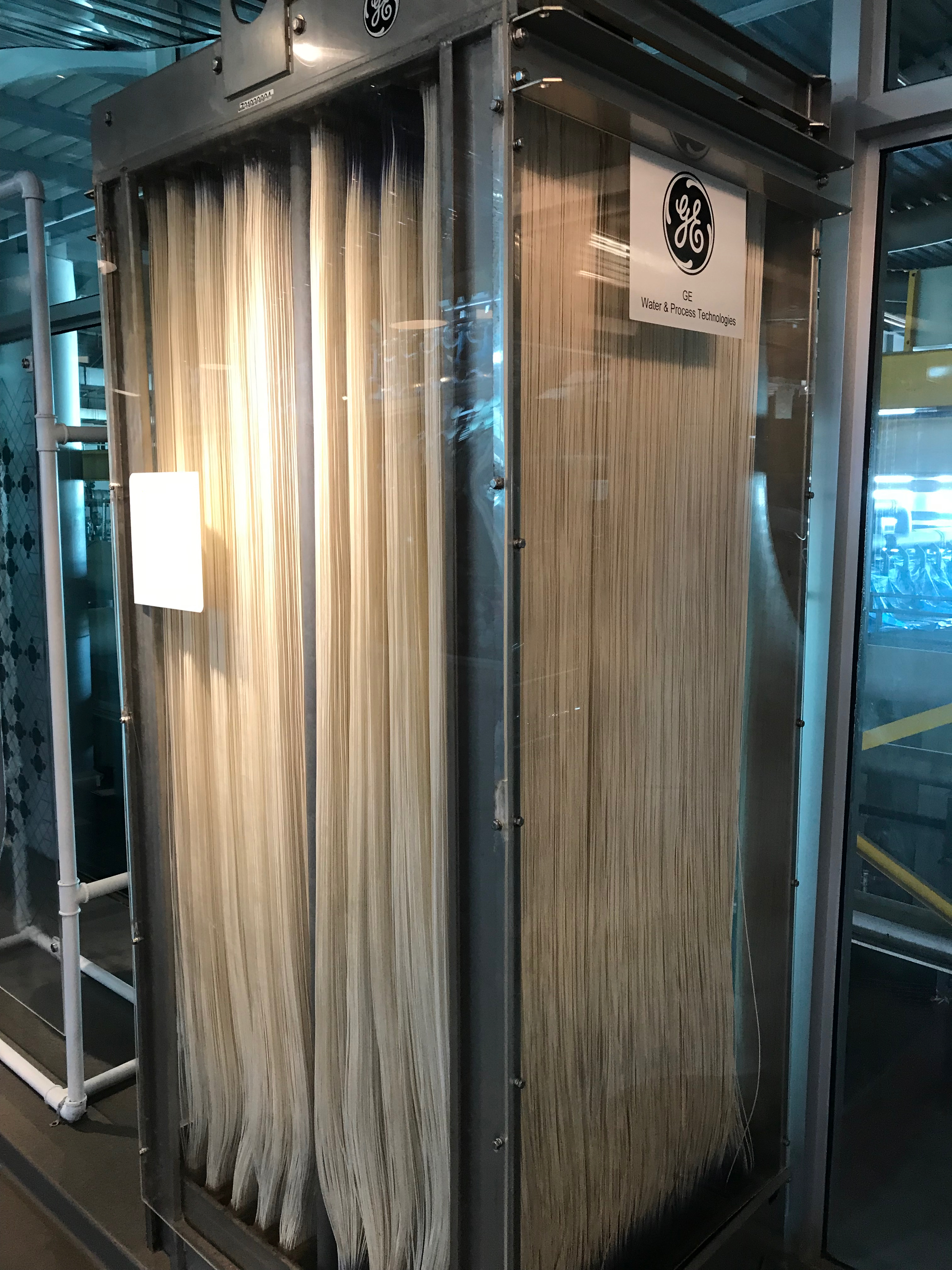
Self-supporting hollow fibre module

This design is conceptually similar to the tubular module with a shell and tube arrangement. A single module can consist of 50 to thousands of hollow fibres and therefore are self-supporting unlike the tubular design. The diameter of each fibre ranges from 0.2–3 mm with the feed flowing in the tube and the product permeate collected radially on the outside. The advantage of having self-supporting membranes is the ease with which they can be cleaned due to their ability to be backflushed. Replacement costs however are high, as one faulty fibre will require the whole bundle to be replaced. Considering the tubes are of small diameter, using this design also makes the system prone to blockage.

=== Spiral-wound modules ===
Spiral-wound membrane module

Are composed of a combination of flat membrane sheets separated by a thin meshed spacer material which serves as a porous plastic screen support. These sheets are rolled around a central perforated tube and fitted into a tubular steel pressure vessel casing. The feed solution passes over the membrane surface and the permeate spirals into the central collection tube. Spiral-wound modules are a compact and cheap alternative in ultrafiltration design, offer a high volumetric throughput and can also be easily cleaned. However it is limited by the thin channels where feed solutions with suspended solids can result in partial blockage of the membrane pores.

=== Plate and frame ===
This uses a membrane placed on a flat plate separated by a mesh like material. The feed is passed through the system from which permeate is separated and collected from the edge of the plate. Channel length can range from 10–60 cm and channel heights from 0.5–1.0 mm. This module provides low volume hold-up, relatively easy replacement of the membrane and the ability to feed viscous solutions because of the low channel height, unique to this particular design.

== Process characteristics ==
The process characteristics of a UF system are highly dependent on the type of membrane used and its application. Manufacturers' specifications of the membrane tend to limit the process to the following typical specifications:

| | Hollow Fibre | Spiral-wound | Ceramic Tubular | Plate and Frame |
|---|---|---|---|---|
| pH | 2–13 | 2–11 | 3–7 | |
| Feed Pressure (psi) | 9–15 | <30–120 | 60–100 | |
| Backwash Pressure (psi) | 9–15 | 20–40 | 10–30 | |
| Temperature (°C) | 5–30 | 5–45 | 5–400 | |
| Total Dissolved Solids (mg/L) | <1000 | <600 | <500 | |
| Total Suspended Solids (mg/L) | <500 | <450 | <300 | |
| Turbidity (NTU) | <15 | <1 | <10 | |
| Iron (mg/L) | <5 | <5 | <5 | |
| Oils and Greases (mg/L) | <0.1 | <0.1 | <0.1 | |
| Solvents, phenols (mg/L) | <0.1 | <0.1 | <0.1 | |

== Process design considerations ==
When designing a new membrane separation facility or considering its integration into an existing plant, there are many factors which must be considered. For most applications a heuristic approach can be applied to determine many of these characteristics to simplify the design process. Some design areas include:

=== Pre-treatment ===
Treatment of feed prior to the membrane is essential to prevent damage to the membrane and minimize the effects of fouling which greatly reduce the efficiency of the separation. Types of pre-treatment are often dependent on the type of feed and its quality. For example, in wastewater treatment, household waste and other particulates are screened. Other types of pre-treatment common to many UF processes include pH balancing and coagulation. Appropriate sequencing of each pre-treatment phase is crucial in preventing damage to subsequent stages. Pre-treatment can even be employed simply using dosing points.

=== Membrane specifications ===
==== Material ====
Most UF membranes use polymer materials (polysulfone, polypropylene, cellulose acetate, polylactic acid) however ceramic membranes are used for high temperature applications.

==== Pore size ====
A general rule for choice of pore size in a UF system is to use a membrane with a pore size one tenth that of the particle size to be separated. This limits the number of smaller particles entering the pores and adsorbing to the pore surface. Instead they block the entrance to the pores allowing simple adjustments of cross-flow velocity to dislodge them.

=== Operation strategy ===
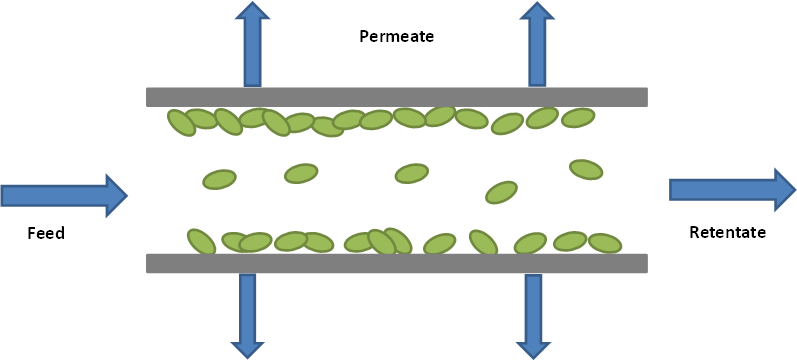
Schematic of cross flow operation.

Schematic of dead-end operation

==== Flowtype ====
UF systems can either operate with cross-flow or dead-end flow. In dead-end filtration the flow of the feed solution is perpendicular to the membrane surface. On the other hand, in cross flow systems the flow passes parallel to the membrane surface. Dead-end configurations are more suited to batch processes with low suspended solids as solids accumulate at the membrane surface therefore requiring frequent backflushes and cleaning to maintain high flux. Cross-flow configurations are preferred in continuous operations as solids are continuously flushed from the membrane surface resulting in a thinner cake layer and lower resistance to permeation.

==== Flow velocity ====
Flow velocity is especially critical for hard water or liquids containing suspensions in preventing excessive fouling. Higher cross-flow velocities can be used to enhance the sweeping effect across the membrane surface therefore preventing deposition of macromolecules and colloidal material and reducing the effects of concentration polarization. Expensive pumps are however required to achieve these conditions.

==== Flow temperature ====
To avoid excessive damage to the membrane, it is recommended to operate a plant at the temperature specified by the membrane manufacturer. In some instances however temperatures beyond the recommended region are required to minimise the effects of fouling. Economic analysis of the process is required to find a compromise between the increased cost of membrane replacement and productivity of the separation.

==== Pressure ====
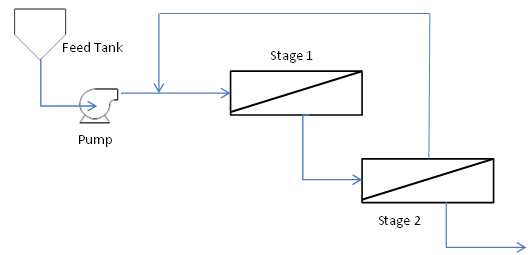
Typical two stage membrane process with recycle stream

Pressure drops over multi-stage separation can result in a drastic decline in flux performance in the latter stages of the process. This can be improved using booster pumps to increase the TMP in the final stages. This will incur a greater capital and energy cost which will be offset by the improved productivity of the process. With a multi-stage operation, retentate streams from each stage are recycled through the previous stage to improve their separation efficiency.

==== Multi-stage, multi-module ====
Multiple stages in series can be applied to achieve higher purity permeate streams. Due to the modular nature of membrane processes, multiple modules can be arranged in parallel to treat greater volumes.

=== Post-treatment ===
Post-treatment of the product streams is dependent on the composition of the permeate and retentate and its end-use or government regulation. In cases such as milk separation both streams (milk and whey) can be collected and made into useful products. Additional drying of the retentate will produce whey powder. In the paper mill industry, the retentate (non-biodegradable organic material) is incinerated to recover energy and permeate (purified water) is discharged into waterways. It is essential for the permeate water to be pH balanced and cooled to avoid thermal pollution of waterways and altering its pH.

=== Cleaning ===
Cleaning of the membrane is done regularly to prevent the accumulation of foulants and reverse the degrading effects of fouling on permeability and selectivity.
Regular backwashing is often conducted every 10 min for some processes to remove cake layers formed on the membrane surface. By pressurising the permeate stream and forcing it back through the membrane, accumulated particles can be dislodged, improving the flux of the process. Backwashing is limited in its ability to remove more complex forms of fouling such as biofouling, scaling or adsorption to pore walls.

These types of foulants require chemical cleaning to be removed. The common types of chemicals used for cleaning are:

- Acidic solutions for the control of inorganic scale deposits
- Alkali solutions for removal of organic compounds
- Biocides or disinfection such as chlorine or peroxide when bio-fouling is evident

When designing a cleaning protocol it is essential to consider:
Cleaning time – Adequate time must be allowed for chemicals to interact with foulants and permeate into the membrane pores. However, if the process is extended beyond its optimum duration it can lead to denaturation of the membrane and deposition of removed foulants. The complete cleaning cycle including rinses between stages may take as long as 2 hours to complete.
Aggressiveness of chemical treatment – With a high degree of fouling it may be necessary to employ aggressive cleaning solutions to remove fouling material. However, in some applications this may not be suitable if the membrane material is sensitive, leading to enhanced membrane ageing.
Disposal of cleaning effluent – The release of some chemicals into wastewater systems may be prohibited or regulated therefore this must be considered. For example, the use of phosphoric acid may result in high levels of phosphates entering water ways and must be monitored and controlled to prevent eutrophication.

Summary of common types of fouling and their respective chemical treatments

| Foulant | Reagent | Time and Temperature | Mode of Action |
|---|---|---|---|
| Fats and oils, proteins, polysaccharides, bacteria | 0.5 M NaOH with 200 ppm Cl_{2} | 30–60 min 25–55 °C | Hydrolysis and oxidation |
| DNA, mineral salts | 0.1–0.5 M acid (acetic, citric, nitric) | 30–60 min 25–35 °C | Solubilization |
| Fats, oils, biopolymers, proteins | 0.1% SDS, 0.1% Triton X-100 | 30 min – overnight 25–55 °C | Wetting, emulsifying, suspending, dispersing |
| Cell fragments, fats, oils, proteins | Enzyme detergents | 30 min – overnight 30–40 °C | Catalytic breakdown |
| DNA | 0.5% DNAase | 30 min – overnight 20–40 °C | Enzyme hydrolysis |

== New developments ==
In order to increase the life-cycle of membrane filtration systems, energy efficient membranes are being developed in membrane bioreactor systems. Technology has been introduced which allows the power required to aerate the membrane for cleaning to be reduced whilst still maintaining a high flux level. Mechanical cleaning processes have also been adopted using granulates as an alternative to conventional forms of cleaning; this reduces energy consumption and also reduces the area required for filtration tanks.

Membrane properties have also been enhanced to reduce fouling tendencies by modifying surface properties. This can be noted in the biotechnology industry where membrane surfaces have been altered in order to reduce the amount of protein binding. Ultrafiltration modules have also been improved to allow for more membrane for a given area without increasing its risk of fouling by designing more efficient module internals.

The current pre-treatment of seawater desalination uses ultrafiltration modules that have been designed to withstand high temperatures and pressures whilst occupying a smaller footprint. Each module vessel is self supported and resistant to corrosion and accommodates easy removal and replacement of the module without the cost of replacing the vessel itself.

== See also ==
- List of wastewater treatment technologies
