= Centennial Campus of North Carolina State University =

Coordinates: 35.771°N 78.676°W

Centennial Campus is a research park and educational campus owned and operated by North Carolina State University in Raleigh, North Carolina, United States. Composed of two locations, the 1,334-acre (540 ha) property provides office and lab space for corporate, governmental and not-for-profit entities, in addition to providing space for 75 university research centers, institutes, laboratories and departmental units. Currently, 5,000,000 sq ft (460,000 m^{2}) of constructed space has been built. Upon completion, Centennial Campus is anticipated to have 9,000,000 sq ft (840,000 m^{2}) of constructed space.

In addition to holding office and lab buildings, Centennial Campus also has the Lonnie Poole Golf Course, a public fishing pier and lake (Lake Raleigh), greenway, disc golf course, and residential living options, including townhomes, apartments and condos. Centennial Campus is also home to the Dorothy and Roy Park Alumni Center.

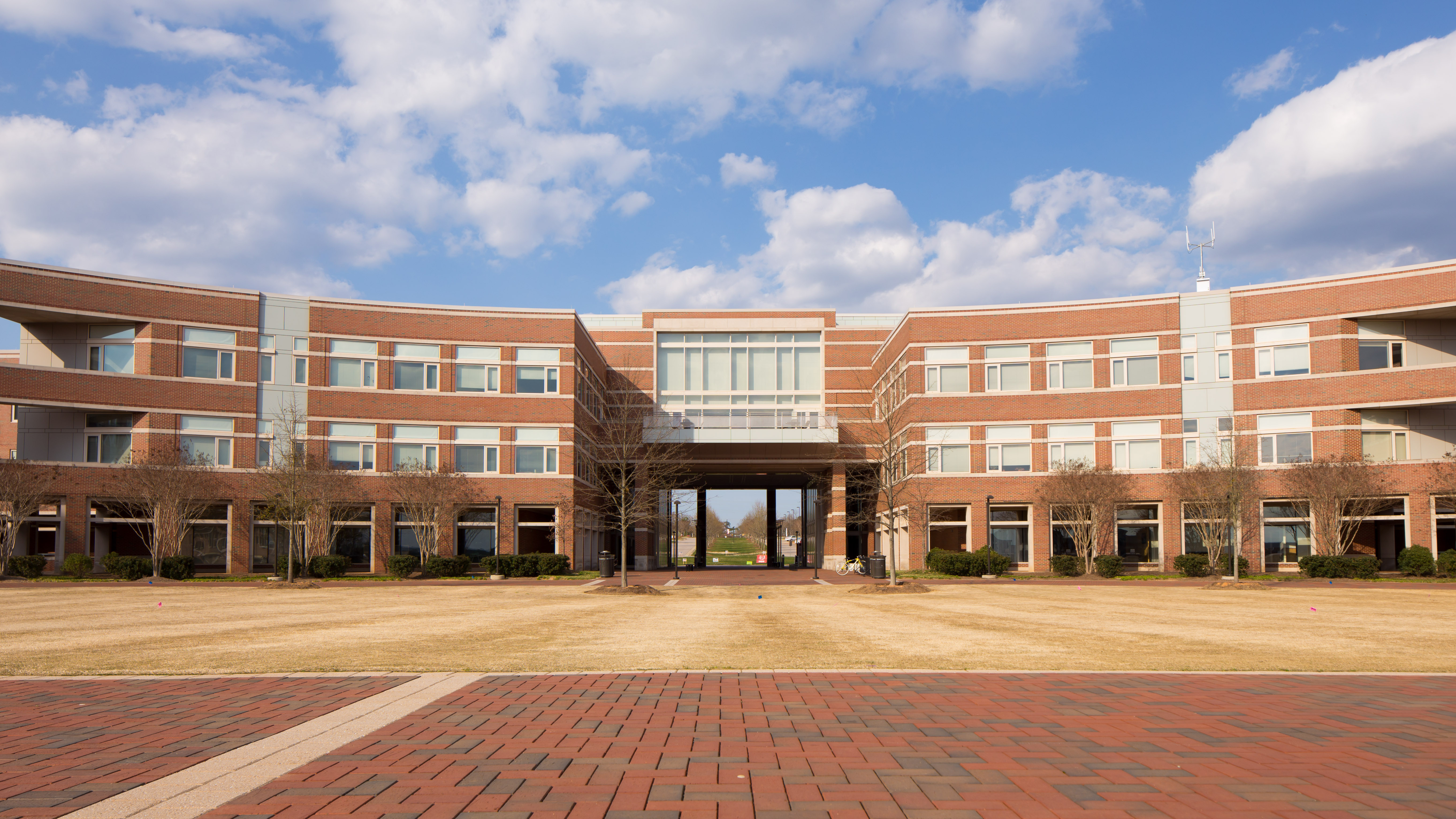
Koch Hall

== Location ==
Centennial Campus is located just south of NC State's main campus in Raleigh, bordering Avent Ferry Road and Centennial Parkway. The campus is approximately 15 miles (24 km) east of Research Triangle Park and Raleigh-Durham International Airport, and 5 minutes from downtown Raleigh.

== History ==
The first tract of land 385 acres (1.6 km^{2}) was turned over to NC State University in 1984 by North Carolina Governor James B. Hunt, Jr. The land was originally part of the state-owned mental health facility, Dorothea Dix Hospital. Another 455 acres (1.8 km^{2}) was turned over to NC State in 1985 by Governor James G. Martin. After the development of a Master Plan under the direction of Claude McKinney, dean of the School of Design, the first building was completed and occupied in 1989. The first corporate tenant, ABB, moved in during 1991. That same year, the College of Textiles moved to Centennial Campus. In 2000, the Centennial Biomedical Campus was established. Beginning in 2002, the College of Engineering began to relocate to Centennial Campus

=== Notable buildings ===
The James B. Hunt Jr. Library, which was completed in late 2012 and opened in January 2013, is the main library for Centennial Campus. The 200,000 sq ft (19,000 m^{2}) Hunt Library, named for former N.C. Governor James B. Hunt Jr., was proposed partially to alleviate overcrowded conditions in university library spaces. It also houses an automated book retrieval system, called the "BookBot," and the Institute for Emerging Issues (IEI), a public-policy organization. The NC General Assembly approved funding for the new library in 2007.

Also under construction is the 110,000 sq ft (10,000 m^{2}) Randall B. Terry, Jr. Companion Animal Veterinary Medical Center. The Keystone Centennial Science Center, a 72,000 sq ft (6,700 m^{2}) lab and office space complex, as well as Engineering Building III, were completed during the summer of 2010.

=== Funding sources for buildings ===
Buildings on Centennial Campus are funded in four ways: (1) state-appropriated funds; (2) university revenue bonds; (3) private development and (4) private fund raising.

=== Awards ===
Centennial Campus was named “Outstanding Research Park” in 2007 by the Association of University Research Parks (AURP) and has received worldwide recognition for its leadership in innovation through public-private partnerships.

== Colleges ==
Three of NC State’s colleges have a major physical presence on Centennial Campus – the Wilson College of Textiles, College of Engineering and the College of Veterinary Medicine. In addition, the Graduate School and the College of Engineering's Golden LEAF Biomanufacturing Training and Education Center (BTEC) are located on the campus. During the academic year, approximately 3,400 students attend classes on the campus. With the completion of Fitts-Woolard Hall, a 225,000-square-foot engineering innovation hub, Centennial Campus now includes the university's entire engineering academic and research offerings.

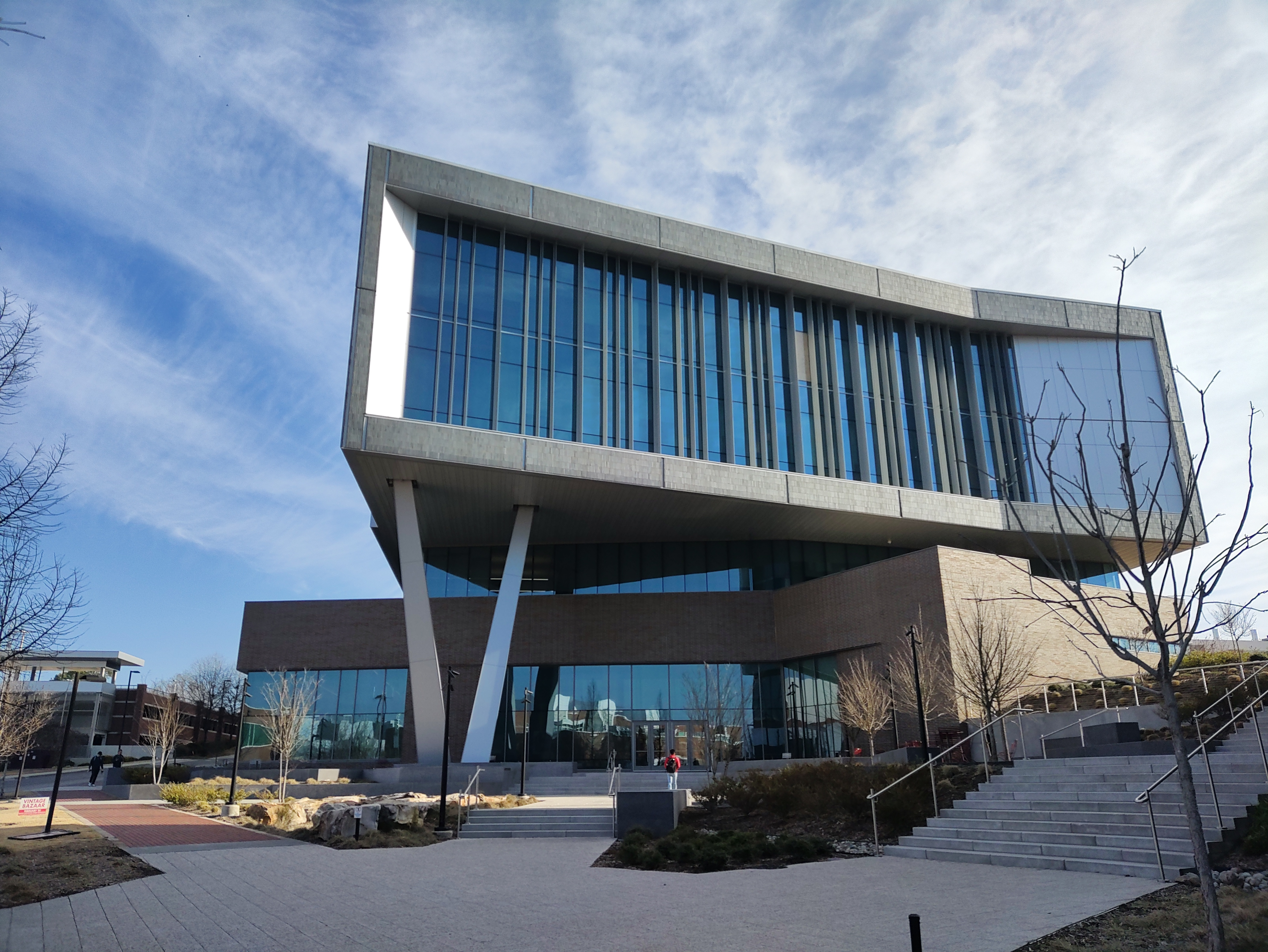
Fitts-Woolard Hall

== Partners and tenants ==
About 75 corporate, government and not-for-profit organizations are located on Centennial Campus. In order to lease space on the property, a prospective "partner" must have some programmatic connection to NC State, such as collaborative research with a faculty member or the use of students for internships or part-time work. Currently, about one-third of the partners are start-up or early stage companies, many located in Centennial's co-working incubator, Raleigh Founded. Another 20% are research and development units of large corporations and the rest are small businesses, state and federal agencies, and non-profits. Current partners include, Hitachi Energy, U.S. Department of Agriculture, IBM, LexisNexis and the National Weather Service's regional office. Centennial Campus is also home to the Centennial Campus Magnet Middle School, a Wake County public magnet school with 600 students.

== Points of Interest ==
=== Research & training facilities ===
Centennial Campus houses the Golden LEAF Biomanufacturing Training and Education Center (BTEC) and the Friday Institute for Innovative Education. BTEC provides education and training in biomanufacturing and bioprocessing involving simulated cGMP production of high-value biomolecules using cell growth and expression, recovery and purification processes. The Friday Institute conducts educational research, develops educational resources, provides professional development programs for educators, and acts as an advocate to improve teaching and learning. Centennial Campus is also home to the FREEDM Systems Center, one of the latest Gen-III Engineering Research Centers (ERC) established by the National Science Foundation in 2008 to develop technology to integrate the nation's power grid with renewable electrical energy technologies. Finally, Centennial Campus is home to the Larry K. Monteith Engineering Research Center, which houses several clean rooms.

=== The Oval ===
The College of Engineering houses all of its engineering buildings on Centennial Campus.

The first two of six university-owned housing buildings on the Oval, called "Wolf Ridge," and a university dining facility opened in August 2013.

The Oval is an oval-shaped courtyard bounded by three Engineering Buildings, the Fits-Wollard Hall, the James B. Hunt Jr. Library, and University Housing and Dining facilities.

=== Lonnie Poole Golf Course ===
The Lonnie Poole Golf Course is a par-71, 7,025-yard golf course designed by The Palmer Course Design Company. In addition to serving as a public golf course, the Lonnie Poole Golf Course is also home to the NC State men's and women's golf teams. The golf course opened to the public in 2009.
