= Diafiltration =

Dilution process

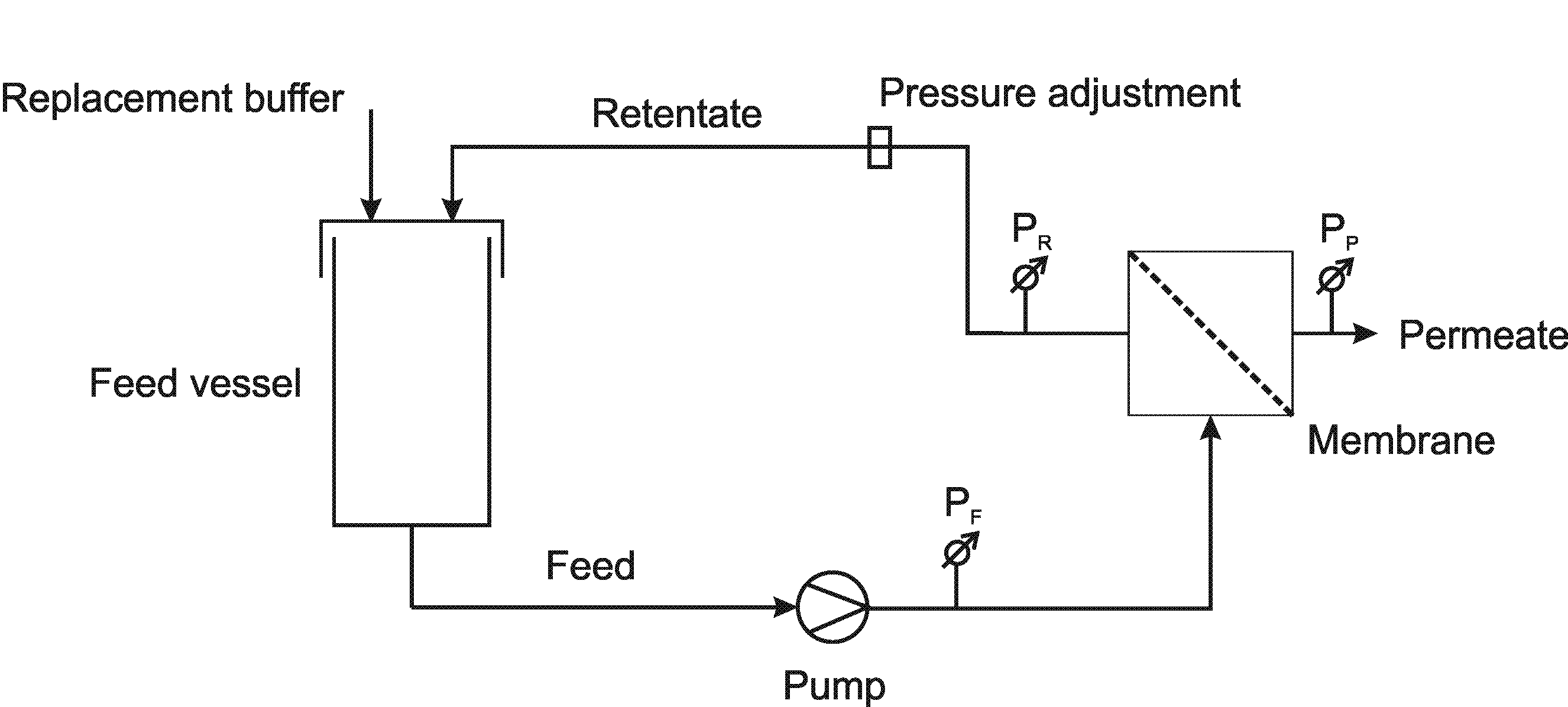
Diagram of a diafiltration device

Diafiltration is a dilution process that involves removal or separation of components (permeable molecules like salts, small proteins, solvents etc.,) of a solution based on their molecular size by using micro-molecule permeable filters in order to obtain pure solution.
