= North Carolina Biotechnology Center =

US research organization

Coordinates: 35.92324°N 78.86633°W

The North Carolina Biotechnology Center is a non-profit, public-private partnership organization located in Research Triangle Park (North Carolina, United States). Founded in 1984 by the North Carolina General Assembly, it was the first state-sponsored biotechnology initiative in the United States, merging the interests of the academic private and public sectors. The North Carolina Biotechnology Center's mission is to provide long-term economic and societal benefits to North Carolina through support of biotechnology research, business, education and strategic policy. It receives nearly all of its funding from the North Carolina General Assembly.

Since 1984, the North Carolina Biotechnology Center has invested more than $187 million in state monies to develop biotechnology statewide. It is not a site for laboratory research or company incubation, but it works to strengthen the research capabilities of North Carolina's companies and universities.

== Locations ==
The permanent headquarters of the North Carolina Biotechnology Center in Research Triangle Park is a hub for work, learning, and interaction. The buildings encompass 67,000 square feet (6,200 m^{2}) and is divided into three main parts:

- A program-management center housing about 70 staff members;
- A full-service biotechnology library, open to the public; and
- The Hamner Conference Center.

In addition to its Research Triangle Park headquarters, the Center has five regional offices across the state:

- Eastern North Carolina (Greenville)
- Greater Charlotte (Charlotte)
- Piedmont Triad (Winston-Salem)
- Southeastern North Carolina (Wilmington)
- Western North Carolina (Asheville)

== Goals ==
The North Carolina Biotechnology Center works toward six goals:

1. Strengthen North Carolina's academic and industrial biotechnology research capabilities.
2. Foster North Carolina's biotechnology industrial development.
3. Work with business, government and academia to move biotechnology from research to commercialization in North Carolina.
4. Inform North Carolinians about the science, applications, benefits and issues of biotechnology.
5. Enhance the teaching and workforce-training capabilities of North Carolina's educational institutions.
6. Establish North Carolina as a preeminent international location for the biotechnology industry.

== History ==
In 1981, the North Carolina Biotechnology Center was created by the North Carolina General Assembly. At that time, the state's General Assembly appointed a legislative study commission to determine how North Carolina could ensure long-term economic benefits from biotechnology. A yearlong study by the commission concluded that North Carolina needed a private, non-profit organization dedicated exclusively to biotechnology development.

Following that recommendation, state legislatures established the North Carolina Biotechnology Center in October 1984 as the world's first government-sponsored biotechnology center.

The first president of the N.C. Biotechnology Center was Leon Golberg, previously head of the Chemical Industry Institute of Toxicology in RTP.
