= Broughton (name) =

Broughton (/ˈbrɔːtən/) is an English surname and placename. It has two claimed origins as a name.

== As a placename ==
According to M. Leon Broughton, author of Broughton Memoirs (1962, Second Edition):

"The name Broughton is often derived from the Saxon "Broc", which means brook or broken land; and "Tun", the dwelling or town. In King Ethelred’s charter to the monastery of Shaftesbury, England, 1001 AD, Elfwig’s boundaries at Broctun are mentioned. The Domesday Book of William the Conqueror, 1086 AD, describes thirty-four manors of Broctun, variously Latinized by the clerks of the records to: Brochthon, Brocton, Brotton, Broton, Brogton, and Broughton, perhaps according to the pronunciation peculiar to the localities where the manors where situated.

Later the spelling of Broughton seems to have generally been adopted. There are about twenty distinct parishes besides hamlets and different localities in England that bear the name; and it is locally applied to a small parish in Canada, to an island in the Alatamaha river in Georgia, and also occurs in the states of South Carolina, Texas, and some of the New England states."

Broughton may also come from an Old English word meaning 'stronghold'. It may also be derived from "berg" (a hill), and "ton" (a town), both Saxon words. This is the case in Lincolnshire, England. At this Broughton, the mound is near the west end of the village and may have been the site of a Roman station Pretorium from about 400 AD. Many Roman coins, bricks, tiles and other artifacts have been found in the area. In the Domesday Book of 1086, the name appears as Bertone. [A Dictionary of English Place-Names, A. D. Mills, Oxford University Press, 1991]

== Broughton as a surname ==
=== People ===
Notable people with the surname include:

- Sir Alfred Broughton (1902–1979), British politician
- Alice Willson Broughton (1889–1980), First Lady of North Carolina
- Andrew Broughton (1602/3–1687), English jurist
- Bruce Broughton (born 1945), American composer
- Broughton (c.1798–c.1850), Indigenous Australian explorer and guide
- Carrie Lougee Broughton (1879–1957), American librarian
- Celeste Gold Broughton (1925–2022), American socialite and writer
- Cortez Broughton (born 1997), American football player
- David Thomas Broughton (born 1981), English folk musician
- Drewe Broughton (born 1978), English footballer
- Gayle Broughton (born 1996), New Zealand rugby player
- Greg Broughton (born 1986), Australian rules footballer
- Hugh Broughton (1549–1612), English theologian
- Irving Broughton (fl. 1970s), American publisher
- Jack Broughton (1703–1789), English fighter
- Jack Broughton (RAF officer) (died 1923), British military officer
- James Broughton (1913–1999), American poet and filmmaker
- Jodie Broughton (born 1988), English rugby player
- John Broughton (born 1952), Australian astronomer
- Joseph Melville Broughton (1888–1949), governor of North Carolina
- Len G. Broughton (1865–1936), American evangelical
- Luther Broughton (born 1974), American football player
- Matthew Broughton (1880–1957), English footballer
- Mel Broughton (born 1960), British animal rights activist
- Needham B. Broughton (1848–1914), American businessman and politician
- Nehemiah Broughton (born 1982), American football player
- Peter Broughton (born 1935), English cricketer
- Rhoda Broughton (1840–1920), Welsh novelist
- Richard Broughton (priest) (c. 1558 – 1634), English Catholic priest and antiquarian
- Richard Broughton (MP) (1524–1604), English politician
- Rob Broughton (born 1983), English MMA fighter
- Robert Broughton (MP) (died 1506), English soldier and politician
- Robert Broughton (activist) (born 1950), Canadian programmer and activist
- Robert Broughton (cricketer) (1816–1911), English cricketer
- Robyn Broughton (1943–2023), New Zealand netball coach
- Roger Broughton, Canadian comic publisher
- Roger Broughton (1958–2004), New Zealand cricketer
- Spence Broughton (c. 1746 – 1792), English highwayman
- T. Alan Broughton (1936–2013), American poet
- Ted Broughton (1925–2016), English footballer
- T.R.S. Broughton (1900–1993), Canadian classical scholar
- Urban H. Broughton (1857–1929), English engineer and politician
- Vernon Broughton (born 2001), American football player
- Viv Broughton (born 1943), British music executive
- William Broughton (1768–1821), early English settler and public servant in New South Wales
- William R. Broughton (1762–1821), British naval officer
- William Grant Broughton (1788–1853), Australian cleric
- Willie Broughton (born 1964), American football player

=== Peerage ===
It is also used as part of the title of some British Peers and baronets.

- Baron Marks of Broughton
- Baron Broughton
- Broughton baronets

=== Fictional characters ===
- Lorraine Broughton, the titular character from the 2017 film Atomic Blonde and its 2012 comic origin "The Coldest City"
