= Sherrills Ford, North Carolina =

- Unincorporated community
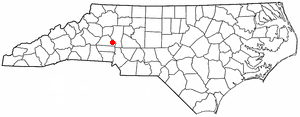
- Location of Sherrills Ford, North Carolina
- Coordinates: 35°36′48″N 80°59′10″W
- Country: United States
- State: North Carolina
- County: Catawba

Area
  - Total: 7.8 sq mi (20.2 km^{2})
  - Land: 7.8 sq mi (20.1 km^{2})
  - Water: 0 sq mi (0.0 km^{2})
- Elevation: 896 ft (273 m)
- Time zone: UTC-5 (Eastern (EST))
  - Summer (DST): UTC-4 (EDT)
- ZIP code: 28673
- Area code: 828
- FIPS code: 37-61320
- GNIS feature ID: 1022598

Sherrills Ford is an unincorporated community and former census-designated place (CDP) in eastern Catawba County, North Carolina, United States. Since the 2010 census, it has been included within the Lake Norman of Catawba CDP. It is part of the Hickory-Lenoir-Morganton Metropolitan Statistical Area.

== History ==
Sherrills Ford was the site of the fording of the Catawba River from east to west by Adam Sherrill and others in about 1747. The Sherrills, of English ancestry, had come from northeast Maryland, most probably trekking through modern Pennsylvania, West Virginia, and Virginia. Along with others, Adam Sherrill established the first settlement by people of European ancestry that far west, and his fine house was built by African-American twins who were slaves.

== Geography ==
According to the United States Census Bureau, the CDP had a total area of 7.8 square miles (20 km^{2}), 0.13% of which is water. It sits at an elevation of 204 m (670 ft).

Neighboring communities include Terrell to the south and east, and Catawba to the northwest.

== Demographics ==
As of the census of 2000, there were 941 people, 367 households, and 273 families residing in the CDP. The population density was 121.0 inhabitants per square mile (46.7/km^{2}). There were 383 housing units at an average density of 49.2 per square mile (19.0/km^{2}). The racial makeup of the CDP was 84.5% White, 13.0% African American, 0.53% Native American, 0.11% Asian, 1.49% from other races, and 0.43% from two or more races. Hispanics or Latinos of any race were 1.49% of the population.

There were 367 households, out of which 35.7% had children under the age of 18 living with them, 62.7% were married couples living together, 8.7% had a female householder with no husband present, and 25.6% were non-families. 21.5% of all households were made up of individuals, and 8.4% had someone living alone who was 65 years of age or older. The average household size was 2.56 and the average family size was 3.00.

In the CDP the population was spread out, with 25.7% under the age of 18, 6.6% from 18 to 24, 32.7% from 25 to 44, 22.4% from 45 to 64, and 12.5% who were 65 years of age or older. The median age was 36 years. For every 100 females, there were 96.9 males. For every 100 females age 18 and over, there were 98.0 males.

The median income for a household in the CDP was $41,406, and the median income for a family was $49,271. Males had a median income of $29,922 versus $30,400 for females. The per capita income for the CDP was $18,001. About 3.7% of families and 6.5% of the population were below the poverty line, including none of those under age 18 and 23.5% of those age 65 or over.

== Arts and culture ==
The Neill–Turner–Lester House and the Miles Alexander Sherrill House are listed on the National Register of Historic Places.

== Parks and recreation ==
Mountain Creek Park is a 606-acre (245 ha) park with trails for biking, hiking and trail running.

== Education ==
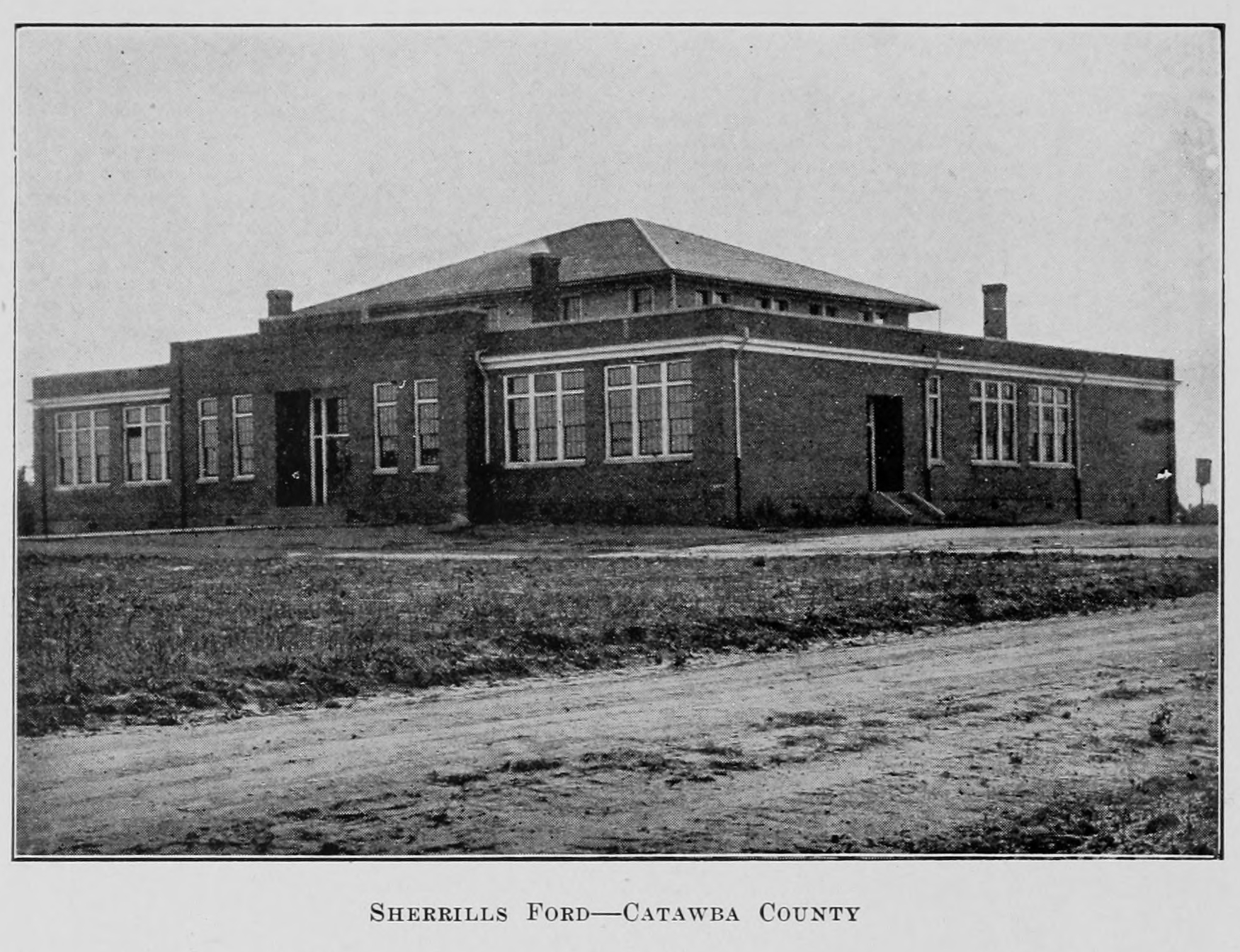
Sherrills Ford School

Lake Norman of Catawba CDP is in the Catawba County Schools school district.

Sherrills Ford Elementary School is located here. Sherrills Ford Elementary feeds into Mill Creek Middle School and Bandys High School.

== Notable people ==
- Todd Gilliland, NASCAR Cup Series driver
- Jesse Little, stock car racing driver
- Miles O. Sherrill, politician and state librarian
- Pappy Sherrill, American old time and bluegrass fiddler
- Braun Strowman, professional wrestler and former strongman, best known for his time in WWE
