= Broughton High School (North Carolina) =

Public school in North Carolina, United States

Needham B. Broughton High School

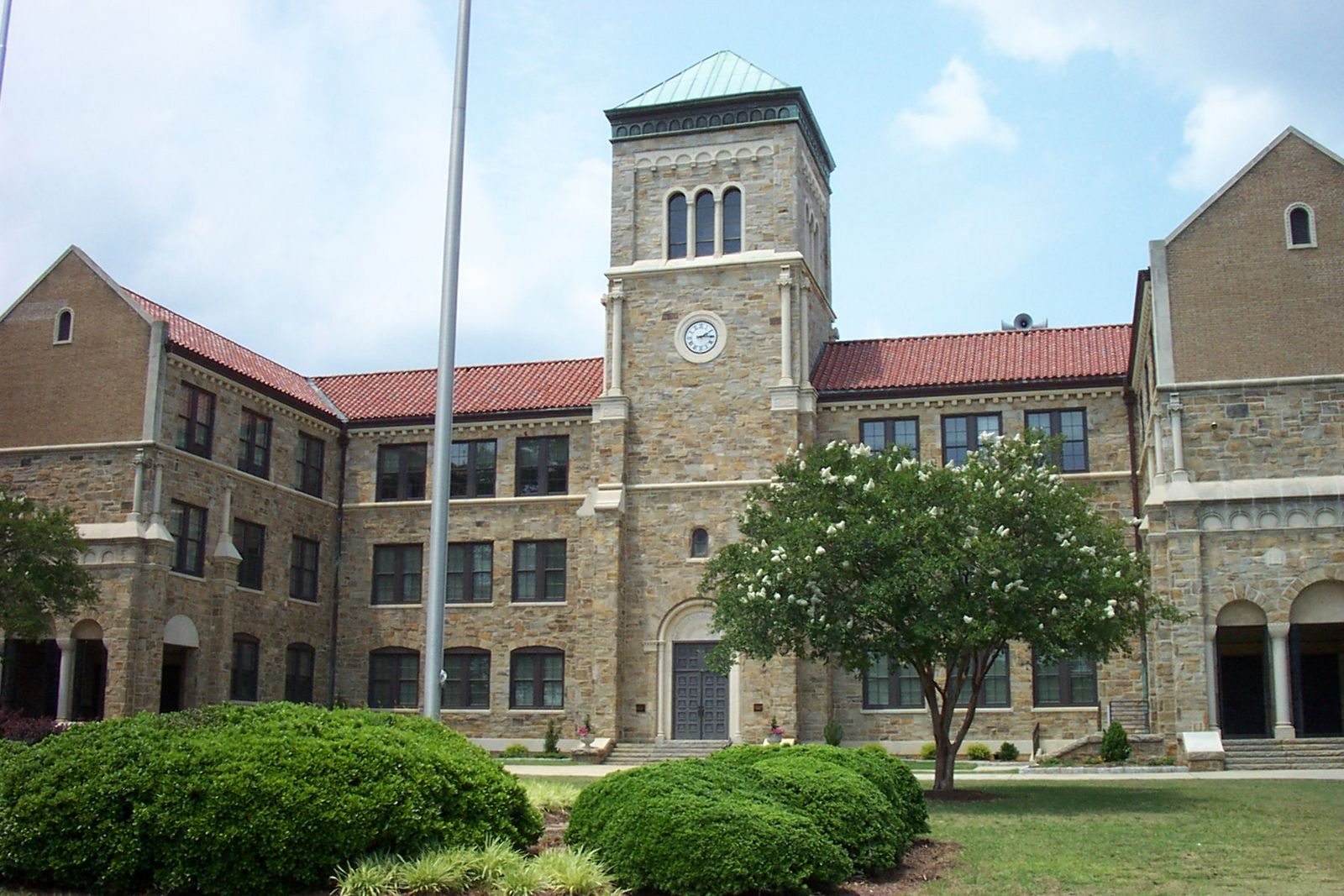
- Front of Broughton High School, June 2007

Location
- 723 St. Mary's Street; Raleigh, North Carolina 27605; United States; 35.7902°N 78.6524°W

Information
- School type: Public
- Established: 1929 (97 years ago)
- CEEB code: 343225
- NCES School ID: 370472001839
- Principal: Janiece Dilts
- Teaching staff: 117.16 (FTE)
- Enrollment: 2,062 (2023-2024)
- Student to teacher ratio: 17.60
- Schedule type: Modified Block, 4-period (A-B Day)
- Hours in school day: Monday–Friday; 7:25 A.M–2:18 P.M
- Colors: Purple and gold
- Fight song: Cheer Broughton
- Athletics: NCHSAA 8A
- Athletics conference: CAP 8A
- Sports: 18 varsity teams
- Nickname: Capitals
- Rival: William G. Enloe High School
- Yearbook: The Latipac
- Degrees: IB Diploma
- Programs: IB Programme
- Website: Broughton Magnet High School

Needham B. Broughton High School (commonly known as Broughton High School) is one of thirty-two high schools in the Wake County Public School System. It is located at 723 St. Mary's Street, Raleigh, North Carolina, United States. Broughton was named after businessman and politician, Needham B. Broughton, who contributed much to the public schools of the Raleigh area. Broughton is known for its castle-like stone facade design and tall bell tower. The architect was William Henley Deitrick.

== History ==
Needham B. Broughton High School was established in 1929 as Raleigh High School. It is the oldest existing high school in Raleigh.

Shortly after the school was built, C. B. Edwards sent a letter to the Raleigh Public School Board, requesting that the school—then without an official name—be named for Needham B. Broughton (1848–1914), in honor of his service to public education in the city. The renaming ceremony took place in 1930, towards the end of the school year.

In 1935, Henry Watson Moore wrote a class song for his graduation, which later became Broughton's alma mater. Broughton's Queen of Hearts dance began in 1943, in an effort to raise funds for World War II. In 1957 during the Civil Rights Movement, Martin Luther King Jr. spoke in the school's former auditorium. Broughton was originally an all-White segregated school. In 1961, Broughton was first integrated when three Black students, Myrtle L. Capehart, Dorothy J. Howard, and Cynthia E. Williams, started attending. However, even a decade later, the News & Observer reported at the time, Black students did not want to go to Broughton, and the wealthy parents of white students already there did not want the school to integrate. Nevertheless, a court order changed the boundaries of Broughton's territory so many Black students were sent there--"a 70%-30% split". Black students felt unwelcome, and white students accused them of causing trouble, but principal Richard Jewell dealt well with the situation.

In 1989, Broughton's 3,000 seat Holliday Gymnasium opened, named after former principal and basketball coach Joe Holliday. In 2009, President Barack Obama visited the school.

== Academics ==
Broughton offers 16 Advanced Placement (AP) courses as well as 28 International Baccalaureate (IB) courses. The school offers four foreign languages: French, German, Mandarin and Spanish. The school runs on a 4x4 modified block schedule (A Day-B Day which allows students to go a whole semester without missing a "core class" or a foreign language).

== Athletics ==
Broughton's sports teams play under the name "Capitals", sometimes shortened to "Caps".

The school offers a variety of different sports teams (the newest of which are the lacrosse and gymnastic teams) that compete in the North Carolina High School Athletic Association (NCHSAA) 8A classification. The Capitals are members of the CAP 8A Conference. Broughton's main sports facilities are the 3,000-seat Capital Stadium and the Holliday Gymnasium.

Broughton's historical rival is Enloe High School.

== Arts ==
Broughton has a band, orchestra, chorus, and dance program, among other groups. The "Carolina Spirit" show choir was known as the top show choir in the country during the 1990s, winning six consecutive Showstoppers National/International Championships. In 2007 the drama department produced Lorraine Hansberry's 1959 Broadway play A Raisin in the Sun. In 2015 the drama team put on The Ugly Duckling at the Scotland Theater Festival.

=== Band ===
Broughton's award-winning band program has attended the 2008 and 2012 Tournament of Roses Parades. The 186 member band was one of fifteen bands selected to participate for the 2008 parade, and one of only six high schools. They were invited to march at the Inaugural Parade for N.C. Governor Bev Perdue. The Jazz I group also performed for President Barack Obama during his visit to Raleigh on July 29, 2009. Broughton also has a concert band, a symphonic wind ensemble, and a jazz band that performed for Jay Leno in 2011 and has made other appearances in Raleigh's "Pieces of Gold" at Memorial Auditorium, and played in Cameron Village's Chick-fil-A and Noodles restaurants.

=== Publications ===
Broughton's publications program includes the annual yearbook and newspaper. The yearbook is named the "Latipac" which is "Capital" (Broughton's mascot) spelled backwards. The school newspaper, the "Hi-Times", is published and distributed several times a year. Articles are also published on the Hi-Times website.

=== Dance ===
Students from Broughton's Dance Program regularly perform throughout the country and at arts functions around the state. They put on several concerts each year, including a benefit concert in December which is completely produced by the Broughton Dance Company. In 2017, the Broughton Dance Director, Betsy Graves, was named Wake County Public School System Teacher of the Year.

== Community service ==
Students are required to perform 25 hours of service each year within the community. Students can also participate in service trips to Guatemala (Proyecto Quetzal) and in projects such as a school-sponsored Habitat for Humanity house.

=== Technology ===
Broughton is serviced by the adjacent Wade Edwards Learning Lab (WELL), a program established by former Senator John Edwards that provides after-school access to computers. Broughton's graphics department has also received an update.

From 2002 to 2004 Broughton underwent a $14 million renovation in which much of the school was gutted and refitted with state-of-the-art technology and new interiors. During the 2004–2005 school year Broughton received an additional $5 million to renovate its Holliday Gymnasium (the state's largest high school gym). One of the highlights of the renovations was the refurbishment of the newly titled Diane Payne Auditorium, named after the retired veteran principal.

=== WCAP ===
Broughton broadcasts its morning announcements via a closed-circuit network, headquartered from the WCAP media studio in the library. WCAP was founded in 1992 as a monthly, pre-recorded news production informing students of events happening around Broughton. By 1993 it had become a live, daily show broadcast from the media center. The set has undergone many renovations throughout the years, and WCAP celebrated its thirtieth birthday on January 30, 2022.

== Notable alumni ==
- Nida Allam, politician
- Christopher Brook, judge on the North Carolina Court of Appeals
- Juston Burris, NFL safety
- Paul Coble, former Mayor of Raleigh
- Brandon Codrington, NFL cornerback and return specialist
- John W. Coffey, author, art historian, Deputy Director for Collections at the North Carolina Museum of Art
- Grady Cooper, Emmy nominated film editor
- Junius Coston, NFL offensive guard
- Mike and David Connell, founders of pop rock group The Connells, whose best-known song '74-'75 remembers the passing of time and how their former comrades have evolved since their time at Broughton High School.
- Allison Dahle, Member of the North Carolina House of Representatives
- Lelynd Darkes, rapper
- Chris Dillon, North Carolina attorney and judge
- Aubrey Dollar, actress and sister of Caroline
- Caroline Dollar, actress and sister of Aubrey
- Cate Edwards, attorney; daughter of former Sen. John Edwards
- Jim Farmer, long distance track runner
- Colin Fickes, actor
- Stormie Forte, first African-American woman and first openly LGBTQ woman to serve on the Raleigh City Council
- Jim Fulghum, neurosurgeon and former member of the North Carolina House of Representatives
- Devonte Graham, NBA player
- Scott Goodwin, professional soccer goalkeeper
- Gene Hamm, professional golfer
- Scott Hoch, professional golfer and Ryder Cup member
- Herb Jackson, painter
- Carl James, former commissioner of the Big Eight Conference
- Richard Jenrette, Wall Street businessman and co-founder of the Donaldson, Lufkin & Jenrette firm
- Bjørn Johnsen, professional soccer player
- Nick Karner, actor and director
- Lauren Kennedy, actress and singer who has performed on Broadway
- Forrest Lasso, professional soccer player
- Sharon Lawrence, actress best known for her role of Sylvia Costas Sipowicz in NYPD Blue
- Beth Leavel, Tony Award-winning stage and screen actress
- Pete Maravich, former LSU and NBA basketball player, member of the Basketball Hall of Fame
- Armistead Maupin, writer of Tales of the City a series of novels
- Burley Mitchell, former Chief Justice of the North Carolina Supreme Court
- Greg Murphy, congressman representing North Carolina's Third Congressional District
- Casey Nogueira, professional women's soccer player, also a former member of U.S. women's U-20 soccer team
- Oscar F. Peatross, highly decorated officer in the United States Marine Corps with the rank of major general
- Danny Peebles, former NFL wide receiver
- Sidney Powell, attorney, writer and media personality
- Reynolds Price, writer, educator, and NPR radio host
- Shavlik Randolph, NBA player
- Peyton Reed, television and film director
- Jerome Robinson, NBA player
- Jim Roland, MLB pitcher
- Hunter Schafer, model, actress, and LGBT rights activist, known for her role as Jules in the HBO television series Euphoria
- Jeremy Shelley, American football kicker
- Webb Simpson, PGA Tour golfer and 2012 US Open Champion
- Fred Smith, politician who served in the North Carolina Senate
- Phil Spence, former college basketball coach and 1974 men's basketball NCAA Champion with NC State
- Anne Tyler, Pulitzer Prize-winning author
- Donald van der Vaart, chemical engineer and lawyer, former Secretary of the North Carolina Department of Environmental Quality
- Blake Wayne Van Leer, former Commander and Captain in the U.S. Navy
- John Wall, NBA player, later transferred to Word of God Christian Academy
- Jesse Williams, high jumper who represented the USA at the 2008 Summer Olympics, 2011 high jump World Champion
