= Miles O. Sherrill =

American politician and librarian (1841–1919)

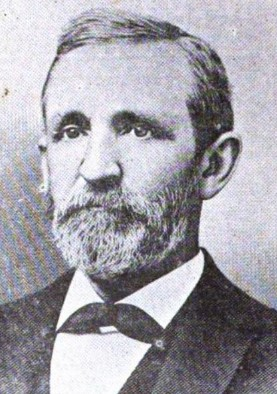

North Carolina House of Representatives
- In office 1883–1884

North Carolina Senate
- In office 1885–1886
- In office 1893–1894

State Librarian of North Carolina
- In office 1899–1917
- Succeeded by: Carrie Lougee Broughton

Personal details
- Born: Miles Osborne Sherrill; July 26, 1841 Sherrills Ford, North Carolina
- Died: April 8, 1919 (aged 77) Greensboro, North Carolina
- Party: Democratic
- Spouse: Sarah H. Bost
- Children: 7 (including Clarence O. Sherrill and Mary Lura Sherrill)

Miles O. Sherrill (July 26, 1841 – April 8, 1919) was an American politician and state librarian from North Carolina. He left college to serve in the Confederate States Army during the Civil War, achieving the rank of first sergeant. He was wounded and captured at the Battle of Spotsylvania Court House and spent the rest of the war in Union prisons. Sherrill served as a court clerk and judge of probate until being elected to the North Carolina House of Representatives. He later served two terms in the North Carolina Senate. From 1899 to 1917, he was the state librarian, improving the library's functions and lobbying for a larger space. He and his wife had seven children, including Clarence O. Sherrill and Mary Lura Sherrill.

== Early life ==
Miles Osborne Sherrill was born on July 26, 1841, in Sherrills Ford, North Carolina, to Hiram and Sarah Osborne Sherrill. He attended Rehoboth Academy and Taylorsville Institute before enrolling in Catawba College, but left school when the Civil War began. He enrolled in the Confederate States Army on April 27, 1861, serving in Company K of the 2nd North Carolina Infantry Regiment, which was reorganized into Company A of the 12th North Carolina Regiment in 1862. Sherrill was given the rank of corporal upon joining, and in May 1862, promoted to first sergeant. He was offered the rank of first lieutenant to serve in a different regiment, but declined.

Sherrill participated in many engagements, starting with the Battle of Hanover Court House, and later the Battle of Gettysburg and Battle of Spotsylvania Court House. It was during the latter when he was wounded and captured in May 1864. His right leg was amputated and he spent several months in a Union hospital. After recuperating, Sherrill was transferred to the Old Capitol Prison in Washington, D.C., until December 1864. He was then transferred to the Elmira Prison in New York where he spent the remainder of the war. He was transferred to Cox's Wharf in Virginia during a prisoner exchange. Sherrill's brother, Albert, and a nephew, Ferdinand Robinson, both died in the war. After the war, Sherrill operated a mercantile business and assisted with managing his mother's farm.

== Public career ==
In April 1868, Sherrill was elected Catawba County clerk of superior court and judge of probate, a position he held until 1882. The following year he was elected as a Democrat to the North Carolina House of Representatives, representing Catawba County. He was later elected to the North Carolina Senate in 1885 and again in 1893. From 1885 to 1889, Sherrill worked in the regional Internal Revenue Service's office. He also served on the board of directors for the Chester and Lenoir Narrow Gauge Railroad.

Sherrill was elected State Librarian of North Carolina in 1899. According to historian and author William S. Powell, Sherrill's tenure was an "enlightened one" which resulted in "significant improvements" to the library's functions. He instituted the library's Dewey Decimal System, improved preservation of some of the state's oldest documents, and lobbied for the hiring of a state archivist and larger space for the library's holdings. During his tenure, the North Carolina General Assembly approved legislation for the library to move into the Administration Building. Sherrill retired as state librarian in 1917 due to failing health. He died April 8, 1919, at his home 210 South Mendenhall Street in Greensboro, North Carolina.

== Personal life ==
On May 1, 1867, he married Sarah R. Bost in Newton, North Carolina. Sarah's father, Joe M. Bost, was a captain in the Confederate States Army who died during the war near Petersburg, Virginia. Sherrill and his wife had seven children. Their son, Clarence, was a lieutenant colonel who served during World War I and was an aide to three presidents. Their daughter, Mary, was a prominent chemist. Sherrill was a member of the Independent Order of Odd Fellows, a trustee of the Davenport College for Women (which later merged into Greensboro College), and authored an autobiography of his time during the Civil War, A Soldier's Story: Prison Life and Other Incidents in the War of 1861-1865 - Elmira Prison Camp. He was an active member of the Methodist Episcopal Church and served as a delegate to the denomination's General Conference.

== Bibliography ==
- A Soldier's Story: Prison Life and Other Incidents in the War of 1861-1865 - Elmira Prison Camp, Sherrill, Miles O., New York History Review Press, 1904, ISBN 9780996535373
