= Brian Broughton =

Brian Broughton may refer to:

- Brian Broughton, see 2006 New Year Honours
- Sir Brian Broughton, 1st Baronet (1618–1708), of the Broughton baronets
- Sir Brian Broughton, 3rd Baronet (died 1724), MP for Newcastle-under-Lyme
- Sir Brian Broughton-Delves, 4th Baronet (1717–1744), of the Broughton baronets, MP for (Much) Wenlock

== See also ==
- Broughton (surname)
