= Emma P. Carr =

American chemist and educator (1880–1972)

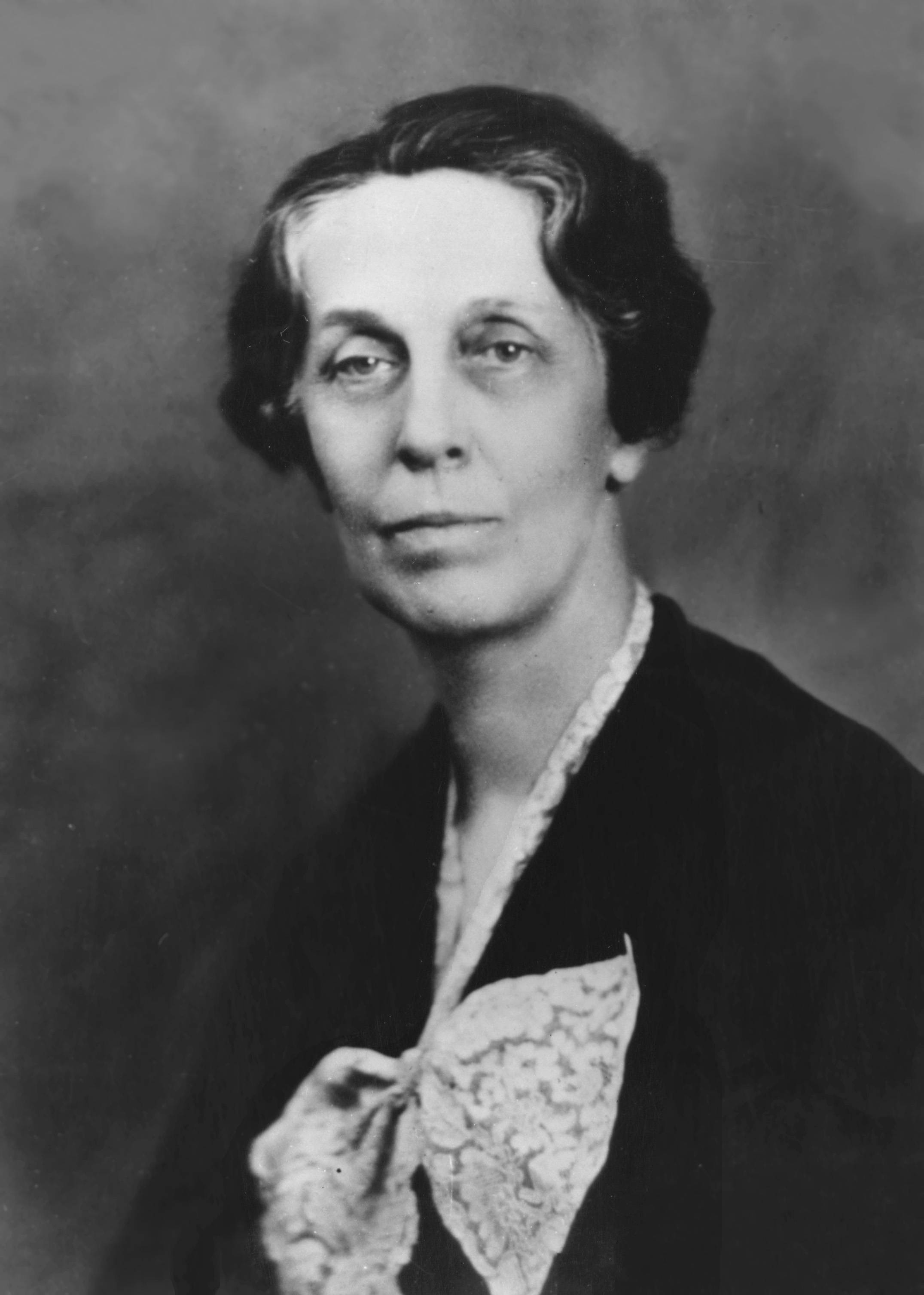
- Born: July 23, 1880; Holmesville, Ohio, USA
- Died: January 7, 1972 (aged 91); Evanston, Illinois, USA
- Education: Ohio State University; Mount Holyoke College; University of Chicago
- Known for: ultraviolet spectroscopy
- Awards: Francis P. Garvan Medal (1937)
- Scientific career
- Fields: chemistry, spectroscopy
- Workplaces: Mount Holyoke College
- Doctoral advisor: Julius Stieglitz

Emma Perry Carr (July 23, 1880 – January 7, 1972) was an American spectroscopist and chemical educator. Her work on unsaturated hydrocarbons and absorption spectra earned her the inaugural Francis P. Garvan Medal (now the Garvan–Olin Medal) from the American Chemical Society in 1937.

== Early life and education ==
She was born in Holmesville, Ohio, the third child of Edmund and Anna Carr. Both her father and grandfather were country doctors who advocated education. She went to high school in Coshocton, Ohio.

She attended Ohio State University from 1898 until 1899. She attended Mount Holyoke College from 1900 until 1902, then worked at the school as an assistant in the chemistry department until she went to the University of Chicago for her senior year in physical chemistry. She received her B.S. from the University of Chicago in 1905. She taught for two years at Mount Holyoke before returning to the University of Chicago to study for her Ph.D., which she earned in 1910.

== Career ==
After receiving her doctorate, she began teaching chemistry at Mount Holyoke College and became chair of the chemistry department in 1913.

She was able to establish a research program studying the ultraviolet spectra of hydrocarbons, and established a link between the frequencies of the absorptions and the enthalpy change of combustion of the compound. She also participated in the International Critical Tables of the International Research Council, where she worked with Professor Victor Henri of the University of Zurich.

Carr was a worldwide leader in the use of the ultraviolet spectra of organic molecules as a means of investigating their electronic structures. She led one of the earliest collaborative research groups that involved faculty, graduate students, and undergraduate students.

Carr was the inaugural recipient in 1937 of the Francis P. Garvan Gold Medal of the American Chemical Society (ACS), established "to recognize distinguished service to chemistry by women chemists". She also received the James Flack Norris Award for Outstanding Achievement in the Teaching of Chemistry of the Northeastern Section of the ACS in Spring 1957 (with colleague Mary Lura Sherrill).

She retired in 1946. When her health began to fail her, she was placed in a care home in Evanston, Illinois, closer to her nephew, James Carr, and the rest of her family. She died of heart failure on January 7, 1972.

== Legacy ==
Much of Carr's energy was spent developing "perhaps the best undergraduate chemistry program in the country" at her alma mater. Her collaborative research group, composed of faculty, graduate students, and undergraduate students, was one of the earliest of its kind.

Mount Holyoke College's chemistry building was dedicated to her in 1955. Carr Laboratory was reopened in Fall 2002 after being renovated and rebuilt in accordance with Leadership in Energy and Environmental Design (LEED) criteria for green building.

== Selected writings ==
- Carr, Emma P.; Burt, C. Pauline (1918), "The Absorption Spectra of some Derivatives of Cyclopropane", J. Am. Chem. Soc., 40 (10): 1590–1600, doi:10.1021/ja02243a009.
- Carr, Emma P. (1930), "A Relation between Ultra-violet Absorption Spectra and Heats of Combustion", Nature, 125 (3146): 237, Bibcode:1930Natur.125..237C, doi:10.1038/125237a0.
- Carr, Emma P. (1947), "Electronic Transitions in the Simple Unsaturated Hydrocarbons", Chem. Rev., 41 (2): 293–99, doi:10.1021/cr60129a008, PMID 18901145.
- Carr, Emma P. (1957), "Research in a liberal arts college", J. Chem. Educ., 34 (9): 467, Bibcode:1957JChEd..34..467C, doi:10.1021/ed034p467.
