= John W. Coffey =

American art historian and curator (born 1954)

John W. Coffey (born March 12, 1954) is an American art historian and curator.

== Education and professional positions ==
Coffey attended Needham B. Broughton High School in Raleigh, North Carolina, received his undergraduate degrees in history and art history from the University of North Carolina Chapel Hill, and received his masters in art history from Williams College in Massachusetts. He was the Deputy Director for Research, the Jim and Betty Becher Curator of American and Modern Art, and Curator of Judaic Art at the North Carolina Museum of Art (NCMA) until 2020, where he had been instrumental in making the museum a nationally renowned institution, having joined its staff in 1988.

He was acting director of Williams College's Museum of Art (1979-80) and curator of collections for Bowdoin College's Museum of Art (1980-88). He has also been an adjunct faculty member of the Art History program at UNC-Chapel Hill.

His life partner is Ann Roth, an artist whose medium is textiles.

== Areas of expertise ==
Coffey has published numerous articles as well as several books and exhibition catalogues reflecting his areas of expertise. He has often engaged in detective work resulting in the recovery and rediscovery of works previously thought to be lost, leading to a reassessment of their value. Examples include the oeuvre of painter Louis Remy Mignot and a large sculpture entitled “Saul Under the Influence of the Evil Spirit” by William Wetmore Story that had disappeared for 150 years.

Engagement with Mignot's work resulted from Coffey's work as a Southerner in a Southern art museum; pursuit of the Story sculpture resulted from his knowledge of collections across US museums. (He told reporter Deena ElGenaidi that "Our American galleries have cried out for a monumental marble of a dramatic subject, and you cannot get more monumental or dramatic than King Saul of the Bible.”

Coffey's expertise in Judaica and Israeli art derived from the NCMA's role as a repository of material gifted to the Museum by some of North Carolina's smaller Jewish communities when they could no long sustain their synagogues and wished to preserve their ritual silverware for posterity. Coffey's role in establishing the Judaic Gallery at the NCMA, "one of only two permanent displays of Jewish ceremonial art in an American art museum," has included playing a role in the acquisition "of approximately two-thirds of the pieces on view." In 2013, well after the Gallery's establishment, he put together an effort to compete with bidders from around the world during an auction of Judaica at Sotheby's that netted the Museum three new pieces. In other roles, Coffey has been the NCMA's liaison with the Friends of the Judaic Art Gallery as well as the statewide director of the Israel/North Carolina Cultural Exchange between 1994-97. The latter role involved travel to Israel and led to his work on contemporary Israeli painting. Moshe Kupferman: Between Oblivion and Remembrance was among the results. His research on the provenance of work in the NCMA has led to some expertise on the issue of art appropriated by the Nazis.

The Landscapes of Louis Remy Mignot: A Southern Painter Abroad, co-authored with Katherine E. Manthorne, garnered national attention. Mignot had been thought of as a minor nineteenth century painter, and his work had been largely lost and forgotten. Manthorne had been studying nineteenth century artists who traveled to South America; Mignot was among them. Coffey, as part of his curatorial activities for the NC Museum of Art, was searching for a Mignot to add to the Museum's collection. Their collaboration ensued; the research and results were supported by grants from The Henry Luce Foundation, the National Endowment for the Arts, and the North Carolina Museum of Art Foundation. Coffey studied nineteenth century records, compiled a list of Mignot's known works, and began contacting possible sources of those works via correspondence and advertisements. His efforts paid off and an exhibition of Mignot's work was first held in Raleigh in 1996. The exhibition then went to the National Academy of Design in New York City, "where Mignot was a member and often exhibited."

Other exhibitions he has organized include "Making Faces: Self-Portraits by Alex Katz" (1990) and "Color, Myth, and Music: Stanton Macdonald-Wright and Synchromism" (2001). The latter exhibition, like the Mignot exhibition, received support from the Henry Luce Foundation and traveled after its opening at the NCMA. In 2016 the Boston Globe reviewer commented favorably on a Childe Hassam exhibition that Coffey co-organized with Austen Barron Bailly of the Peabody Essex Museum, where the exhibition was held. Coffey worked with Hal Weeks of the Shoals Marine Laboratory to identify precise locations for each painting, mirroring the artist's own exactitude.

In 2010 Coffey participated in a study of memorials in the state capital published by the North Carolina Historical Commission. His assessment of the Confederate memorials as art was negative, a point cited in 2017 during local and national debates about Civil War statues resulting in the controversial removal of many of them, including in Durham, North Carolina.
