= Len G. Broughton =

Baptist minister

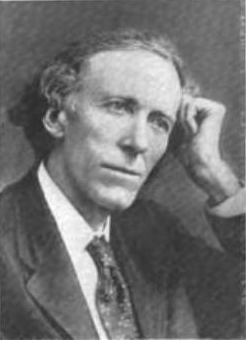
- Len G. Broughton in 1911
- Born: Leonard Gaston Broughton; December 5, 1865; Wake County, North Carolina
- Died: February 22, 1936 (aged 70); Atlanta, Georgia
- Education: Wake Forest College; Kentucky School of Medicine
- Occupations: Founder of Tabernacle Baptist; Preacher at Christ Church
- Known for: Fundamentalism, Evangelicalism, Temperance movement, Prolific author
- Title: D.D., M.D.
- Spouse: Roxana Barnes
- Children: Len G. Broughton, Jr.

Leonard Gaston Broughton (December 5, 1865 – February 22, 1936) was a fundamentalist Baptist minister and medical doctor. He founded the Tabernacle Baptist Church in Atlanta, Georgia and later the Tabernacle Infirmary, which became Georgia Baptist Hospital.

== Early life ==
Broughton was born in 1865 on a farm in Wake County, North Carolina, about 12 miles outside of Raleigh, North Carolina. He was the second son of Lieutenant Gaston H. Broughton and Louisa Hawkins Franks. His father was a poor farmer who served as an officer in the 26th North Carolina Regiment of the Confederate States Army during the American Civil War, was captured by Union troops at the Battle of Gettysburg, and was held prisoner until the end of the war. After his return from the war, the family moved to Raleigh where the children, including Len, were schooled via the aid of a wealthy uncle, Needham B. Broughton.

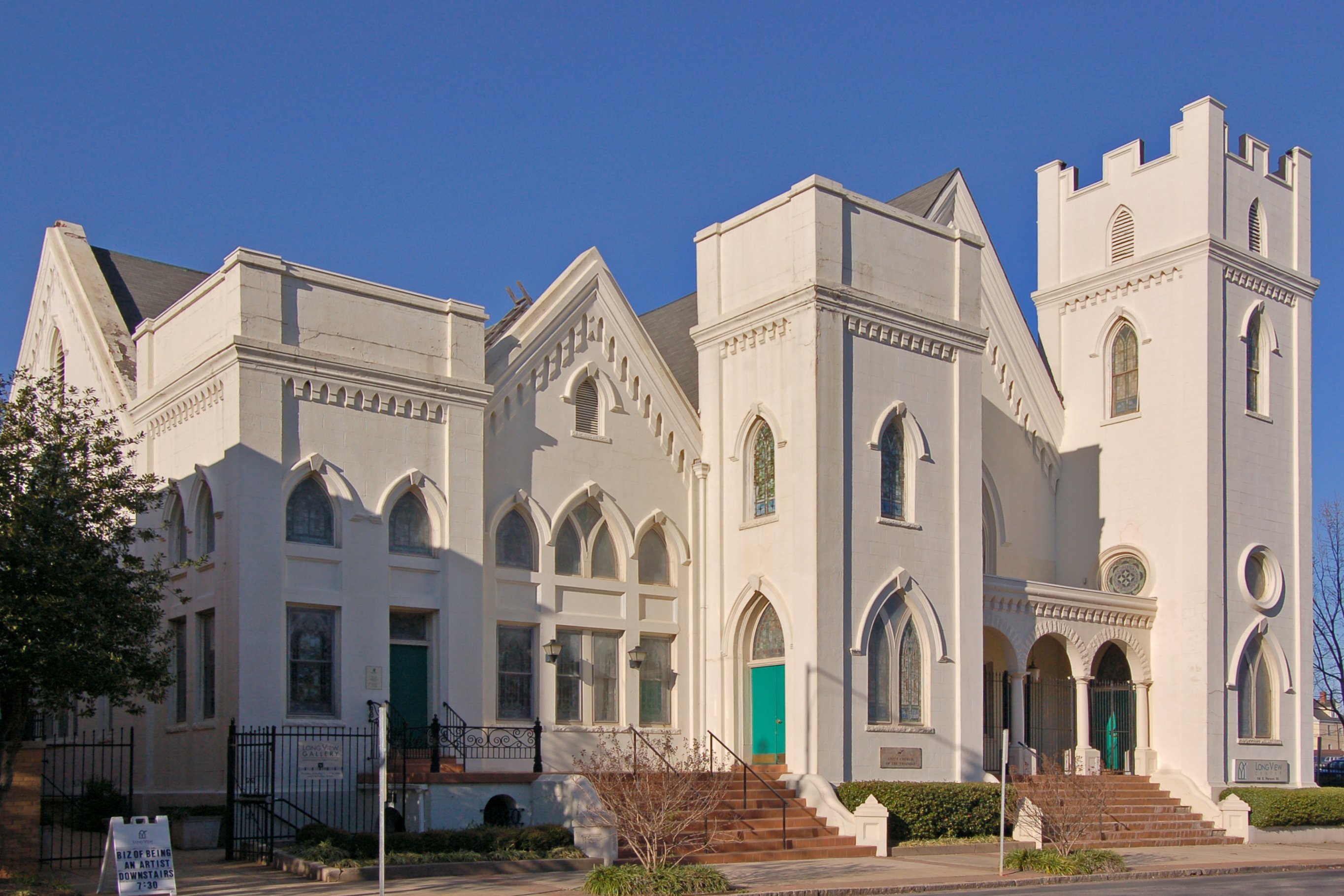
The former Tabernacle Baptist Church in Raleigh, where Broughton was baptized

Broughton was a first cousin of State Librarian Carrie Lougee Broughton and U.S. Senator and Governor of North Carolina J. Melville Broughton.

At the age of fourteen, Broughton was baptized into his faith at what was later known as Tabernacle Baptist Church in Raleigh.

Broughton attended Wake Forest College with his brother Charlie though he did not graduate due to illness. (Wake Forest granted him a D.D. later). Broughton went on to attend the Kentucky School of Medicine at Louisville and achieved an M.D.

== Career ==
He moved to Wilson County, North Carolina to practice medicine and it was there that he met his wife Roxana Barnes. He later also practiced medicine in Reidsville, North Carolina for four years. It was there that he contracted Typhoid fever. A long period of recovery helped him make the decision to become a minister.

In March 1891 he became the pastor of a small church in Winston, North Carolina. In the year and a half he was there, the church gained one hundred members. He became known for this and other churches sought his services. He accepted such an offer in November, 1893 at Calvary Church in Roanoke, Virginia.

In March 1898 he became pastor of Third Baptist Church in Atlanta. He had been in Atlanta only a short while when he started a project to build a much larger facility for the congregation, nearer to the center of town, to be known as the Tabernacle. Many of the older members of the church opposed Broughton's plan, and when it passed by a vote of 542 to 240, the church was split into two. Those opposed remained to form Jones Avenue Baptist Church in the existing facility, and the rest went with Broughton to form Tabernacle Baptist Church nearby. On March 5, 1899, a church structure was dedicated but rapid growth quickly rendered it obsolete. On March 9, 1910 the cornerstone was laid on a huge new four-story structure to house the church. (This structure still stands, it is now used as a music venue). Broughton had a long and successful tenure as pastor of this church, creating many new programs including Tabernacle Infirmary in 1901 (which would later become Georgia Baptist Hospital) and the largest Bible Conference in the South at the time.

Broughton again was receiving many requests to leave his church for posts elsewhere. In 1912 he accepted such an offer of a position at Christ Church in London, England, a church famous among Baptists of the time because of the work of F.B. Meyer. He remained there for over 2 years, but the outbreak of World War I and his own declining health took its toll. He left in 1915 and took a post at First Baptist in Knoxville, Tennessee. From 1923 to 1927, he was the pastor of First Baptist Church in Jacksonville, Florida.

Broughton returned to Tabernacle Baptist Church in Atlanta from 1929 to 1931. He died in 1936 and was buried in Knoxville.

== Selected bibliography ==
- Broughton, Len G. (1900), The Revival of a Dead Church, Chicago: Fleming H. Revell Company, p. 131, OCLC 2218644
- Broughton, Len Gaston (1903), God's Will and My Life, New York: Fleming H. Revell Company, p. 30, OCLC 6370309
- Broughton, Len G. (1905), The Soul-Winning Church, New York: Fleming H. Revell Company, p. 126, OCLC 6213397
- Broughton, Len G. (1906), Table Talks of Jesus, New York: Fleming H. Revell Company, p. 111, OCLC 6339316
- Broughton, Len G. (1907), The Second Coming of Christ, New York: Fleming H. Revell Company, p. 158, OCLC 6308991
- Broughton, Len G. (1908), Salvation and the Old Theology: Pivot Points in Romans, New York: Fleming H. Revell Company, p. 188, OCLC 3689290
- Broughton, Len G. (1909), The plain man and his Bible : with suggestions for the formation and conduct of a popular Bible class, Philadelphia, Pennsylvania: Griffith & Rowland Press, p. 116, OCLC 10716424
- Broughton, Len Gaston (1909), Religion and Health, New York: Fleming H. Revell Company, p. 62, OCLC 3909901
- Broughton, Leonard Gaston (1910), The kingdom parables and their teaching: a study of Matthew XIII, New York: Fleming H. Revell Company, p. 121, OCLC 6258350
- Broughton, Len G. (1910), The Prayers of Jesus, New York: Hodder and Stoughton, p. 214, OCLC 24198811
- Broughton, Len G. (1913), The Prodigal and Others: a series on ruin and redemption, New York: Fleming H. Revell Company, p. 234, OCLC 13448746
- Broughton, Len G. (1914), Christianity and the Commonplace, London: Hodder & Stoughton, p. 201, OCLC 4298500
- Broughton, Len Gaston (1916), Is Preparedness for War Unchristian?, New York: Hodder & Stoughton, George H. Doran Company, p. 219, OCLC 5822194
- Broughton, Len Gaston (1918), Britain in War Through American Eyes, London: Marshall, p. 55, OCLC 249741060
- Broughton, Len G. (1920), Heart Talks from the Psalms, New York: The Book Stall, p. 178, OCLC 12976839
- Broughton, Len G. (1920), Seed Time and Harvest, Atlanta, Georgia: Alkahest System, p. 152, OCLC 15049971
- Broughton, Len G (1924), Soul consciousness after death, Nashville, Tennessee: Sunday School Board of the Southern Baptist Convention, p. 159, OCLC 9309671
- Broughton, Len G; Lutzweiler, James (1993), Fiche fragments of fundamentalism. Part I, The works of Leonard Gaston Broughton (1865-1936), Greensboro, North Carolina: The Schnappsburg University Press, OCLC 36209110
