= Mary Lura Sherrill =

American chemist (1888–1968)

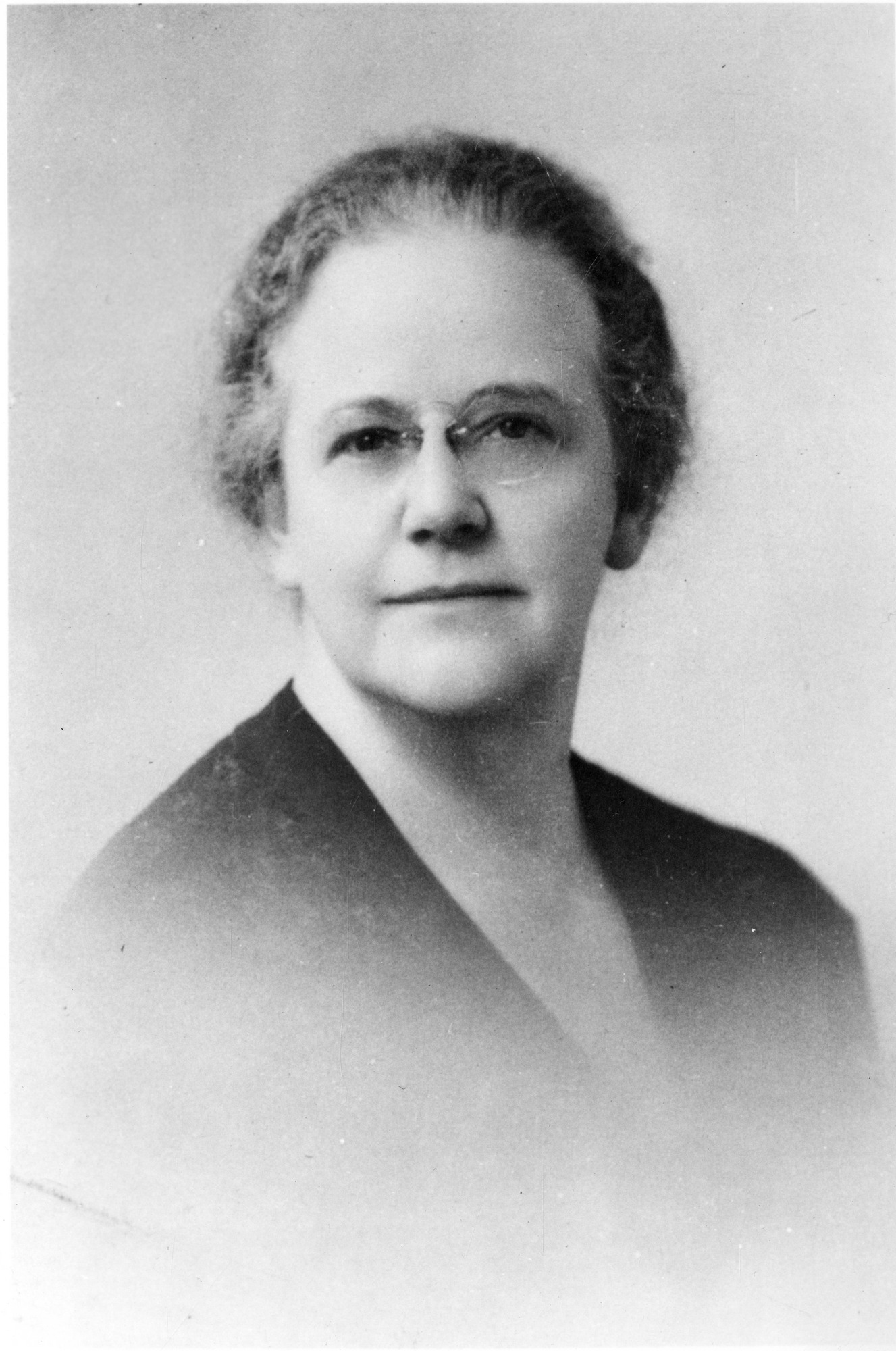
- Mary Lura Sherrill
- Born: July 14, 1888; Salisbury, North Carolina, U.S.
- Died: October 27, 1968 (aged 80); High Point, North Carolina, U.S.
- Education: Randolph-Macon Women's College, University of Chicago
- Awards: Garvan-Olin Medal (1947)
- Scientific career
- Fields: Chemistry
- Workplaces: Randolph-Macon Women's College, North Carolina College for Women, Mount Holyoke College
- Doctoral advisor: Julius Stieglitz
- Notable students: Emma Perry Carr

Mary Lura Sherrill (July 14, 1888 – October 27, 1968) was recognized for her achievements in chemical research, particularly the synthesis of antimalarial compounds, and for her teaching at Mount Holyoke College. In 1947, she received the Garvan Medal, an award for women in chemistry.

== Early life and education ==
Sherrill was born in Salisbury, North Carolina, on July 14, 1888, the daughter of Miles Osborne Sherrill and Sarah (Bost) Sherrill. Two of her brothers were Clarence O. Sherrill, a military officer and aide to three U.S. presidents, and Joseph G. Sherrill, who helped found the American College of Surgeons. She was educated at public schools in North Carolina, before attending Randolph-Macon Women's College, where she received a B.A. in chemistry in 1909. Her interest in chemistry was stimulated by one of her freshmen year teachers, Fernando Wood Martin.

== Learning and teaching ==
Sherrill continued her education by combining teaching and study. She worked as an assistant in chemistry at Randolph-Macon while taking classes towards her M.A. degree in physics, which she earned in 1911. She continued to teach at Randolph-Macon until 1916.

During the 1916–1917 academic year, Sherrill attended the University of Chicago Ph.D. program. From 1917 to 1920, she attended the University of Chicago during the summer while teaching during the winter. She worked at Randolph-Macon in 1917–1918 and at North Carolina College for Women in 1918–1920. She was mentored by Julius Stieglitz. For her graduate research, she studied the synthesis of barbiturates, and methods of synthesizing esters of methylenedisalicylic acid.

During the first world war, Stieglitz actively recruited chemists for the war effort. Sherrill worked full-time as a research associate for the Chemical Warfare Service (CWS) in 1920–1921. Her research involved the synthesis of a gas to cause sneezing, and she obtained a patent on its commercial production.

After the war, Stieglitz recommended Sherrill to Emma Perry Carr, chair of the Mount Holyoke chemistry department. Sherrill worked as a research assistant there from 1921 to 1923, while finishing her Ph.D. thesis. She received her doctorate from the University of Chicago in 1923.

== At home and at work at Mount Holyoke ==
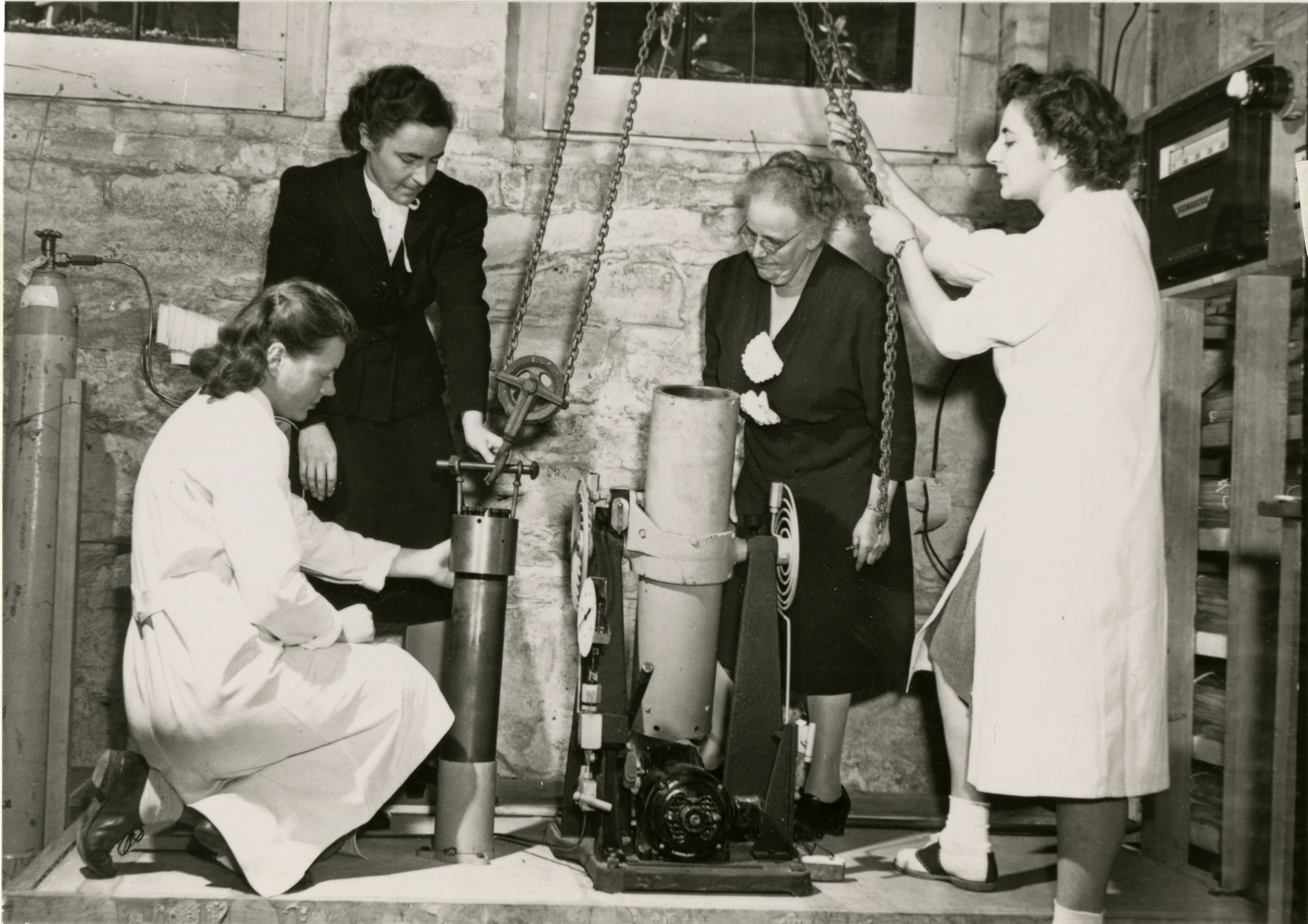
Kathleen Zier, Anna Jane Harrison, Mary Sherrill, Marie Mercury (1947)

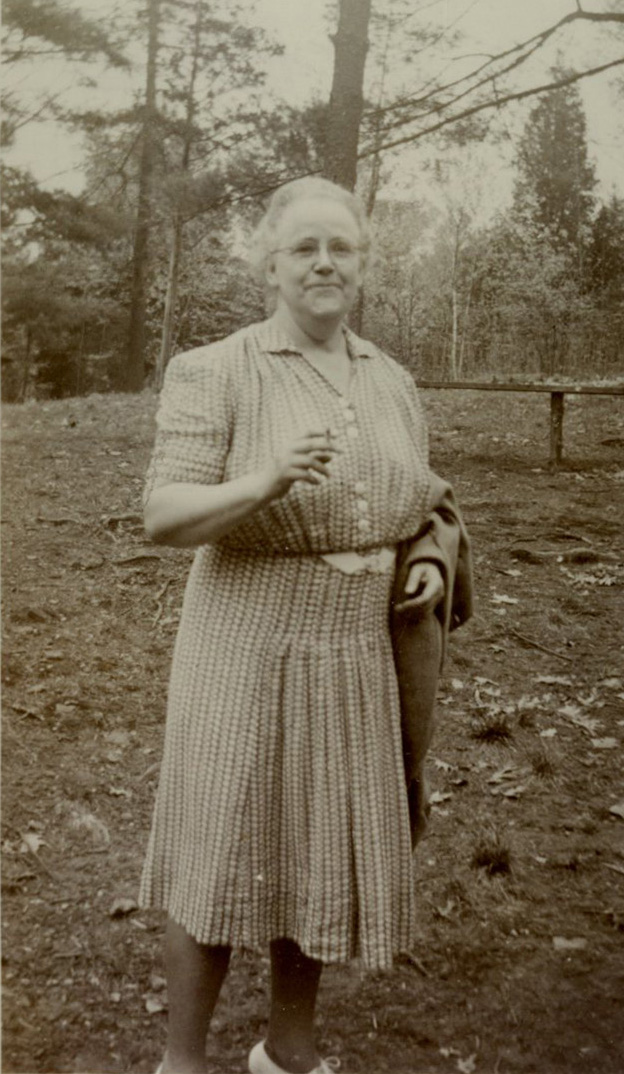
Mary Lura Sherrill (1945)

After completing her Ph.D., Sherrill was promoted to associate professor of chemistry (1924) and then to full professor (1931). She became department chair in 1946. She and Emma Perry Carr became devoted friends, living, working, and traveling together. Their colleague Lucy Weston Pickett was to recall: "She was very devoted to Miss Carr... and they worked very well together. She was a good teacher and a good scientist in her own right, but somehow we thought of them together."

The chemistry department at Mount Holyoke was organized as a research group, in which faculty, master's students and undergraduates worked together. Sherrill advocated the combination of teaching and active research investigation for its benefits to both teachers and students. The Mount Holyoke group investigated the ultraviolet spectroscopy of organic molecules. Mary Sherrill's contribution to the group was the synthesis and purification of organic compounds, in preparation for spectroscopic examination. This was essential work if the results of the analysis were to be meaningful. Sherrill worked initially with a Fery spectrograph, after 1926 with a Hilger quartz spectrograph, and after 1930 with a fluorite prism spectrograph. Later the lab obtained two Beckman spectrophotometers.

In 1928–1929, Sherrill was awarded a fellowship to study new purification techniques being used overseas. She visited Jacques Errera in Brussels and Johannes Diderik van der Waals in Amsterdam. With Errera, she also studied the relationship between dipole moments and molecular structure. Mary Sherrill also visited in Europe in 1936, studying in Brussels, in Oxford, and at the University of Vienna.

During World War II, it became difficult to obtain quinine for the treatment of malaria. Understanding the action of organic compounds and finding alternative treatments for malaria became an important area of work for the war effort. Sherrill and others including Emma Perry Carr, Mary Mercury Roth, Eleanor Anderson and Jean Crawford worked on the synthesis of antimalarial drugs for the wartime Office of Scientific Research and Development (OSRD).

Mary Sherrill published on a variety of topics including preparation and identification of chemical derivatives, isomerism, ring compounds, dipole moments and molecular constitution, pentenes, heptenes, methylbutene and quinazoline derivatives. Her contributions were noted in the Annual Survey of American Chemistry (1930): "The preparation and purification of chlorides, bromides and iodides of normal heptane and the corresponding hydroxy-derivatives and the determinations of their dipole moments constitute valuable contributions". The Vassar Chronicle (1948) reported "A constant and active researcher, Professor Sherrill has contributed to the knowledge of the relation between physical properties and molecular structure, and has developed the application of physical methods to the study of organic compounds."

== Awards and honors ==
In recognition of both her teaching and research work, Mary Lura Sherrill was awarded the Garvan Medal for women in chemistry in 1947. She is one of three women from her research group at Mount Holyoke College who have independently won the prestigious award, the others being Emma Perry Carr (1937) and Lucy W. Pickett (1957).

With Emma Perry Carr, she received the James Flack Norris Award for Outstanding Achievement in the Teaching of Chemistry from the Northeastern Section of the American Chemical Society in Spring 1957.

She retired from teaching at Mount Holyoke in 1954.

Mary Lura Sherrill died on October 27, 1968, in High Point, North Carolina.
