= Needham B. Broughton =

American businessman and politician (1848-1914)

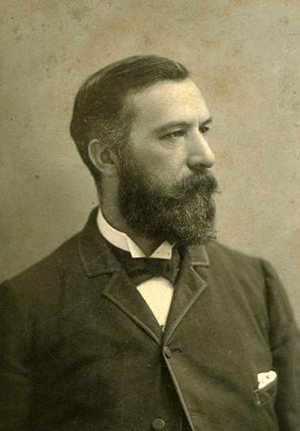
- Broughton circa. 1902

Member of the North Carolina Senate from the Wake County district
- In office 1901–1903

Personal details
- Born: Needham Bryant Broughton; February 14, 1848 Near Auburn, North Carolina, U.S.
- Died: May 26, 1914 (aged 66) Philadelphia, Pennsylvania, U.S.
- Resting place: Historic Oakwood Cemetery, Raleigh, North Carolina, U.S.
- Party: Democratic Party
- Spouse: Caroline R. Lougee
- Children: 6 (including Carrie)
- Parents: Joseph Broughton (father); Mary Bagwell (mother)

Needham Bryant Broughton (February 14, 1848 – May 26, 1914) was an American printer, temperance activist, and politician who served as a North Carolina state senator from 1901 to 1903. He co-owned a prosperous printing business, Edwards & Broughton, and was a member of several commercial organizations. An active member in the North Carolina Baptist community, he served as secretary of the Southern Baptist Convention for approximately 30 years. Broughton was born in 1848 near Auburn, North Carolina. Eight years later his family moved to Raleigh, and he enrolled in public school. After several years of work in printing offices which saw him employed in Washington, D.C., and New York City, Broughton returned to Raleigh and married. In 1872 he and C.B. Edwards established the Edwards & Broughton Printing Company. It quickly became one of the largest printers in North Carolina, and for a time it did most of the printing and binding of state publications.

Broughton was a devout Baptist who acted as a lay preacher, deacon, Sunday school superintendent, and secretary of the Southern Baptist Convention for about 30 years. Inspired by his religious convictions, he avidly campaigned for temperance and the prohibition of alcohol in North Carolina. He served one term in the North Carolina State Senate for the Democratic Party to prevent the seat from being filled by an anti-prohibition candidate. Broughton also supported public education, securing tax increases to fund Raleigh's schools and serving on the boards of trustees for several state institutions. He fell ill in 1913 and was forced to retire, dying the following year in a hospital in Philadelphia. Needham B. Broughton High School in Raleigh was named in his honor.

== Early life and printing career ==
Needham Bryant Broughton was born on February 14, 1848, on a farm near Auburn, North Carolina, to Joseph Broughton and Mary Bagwell. His paternal grandfather was an English immigrant. Joseph Broughton died in 1854, leaving Bagwell to care for Needham, his three brothers, and his three sisters by herself. In 1856, Broughton moved to Raleigh, North Carolina, with his family and studied in public schools for five years.

When Broughton was 13 years old he was hired by editor John W. Syme to work in The Raleigh Register's printing office. When the publication was suspended in 1864, he was subsequently hired by John L. Pennington to perform similar work for the Daily Progress. Upon the conclusion of the Civil War in 1865, Broughton traveled to Richmond, Virginia, to find employment. He worked for the Richmond Examiner for six months before moving to Washington, D. C. to work for the Congressional Record. Quitting after the close of Congress' 1867 session, in August he left for Baltimore. After a brief stay there and in Philadelphia, he settled in New York City. Broughton struggled to obtain employment for two weeks, and spent one day working on the New York World. He then set type for the New York Herald for over three months.

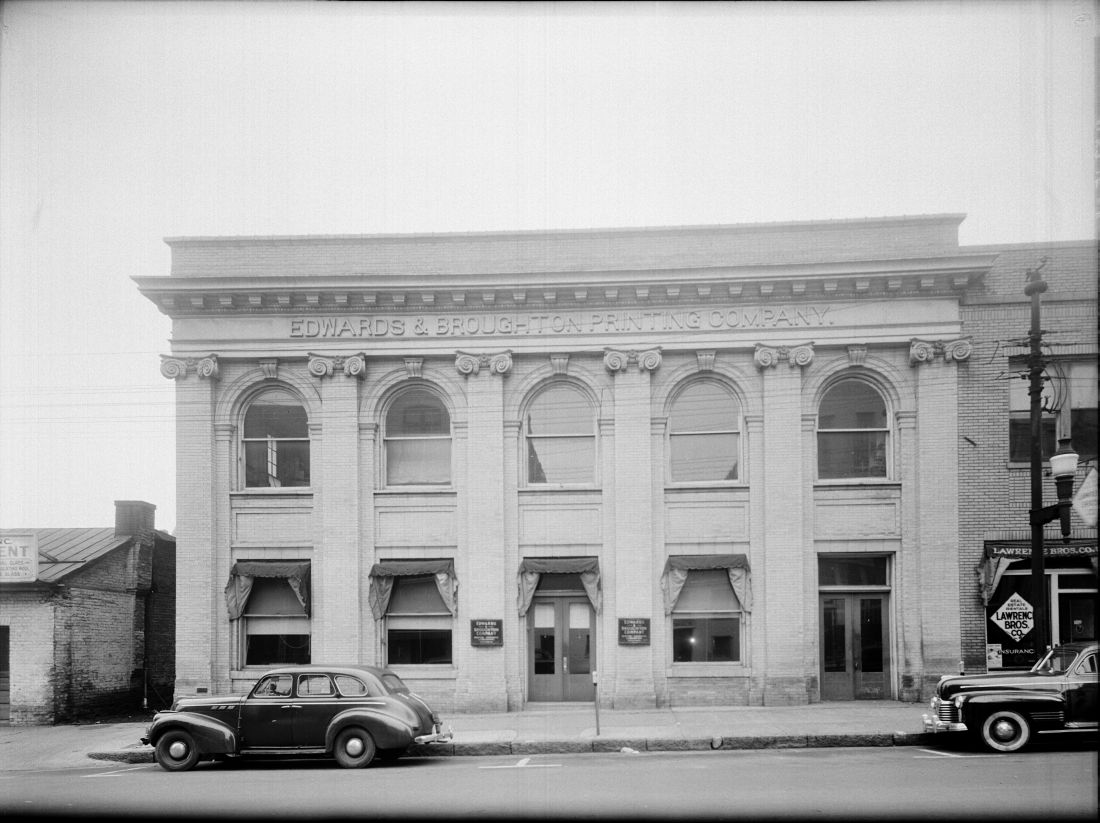
Edwards & Broughton Printing Company building, built in 1907 on Salisbury Street

Broughton returned to Raleigh in February 1869. In May he married Caroline R. Lougee. They had six children. In 1872 Broughton and C. B. Edwards (Note: The two had met while working in the office of the Daily Progress.) purchased the office of the defunct Raleigh Standard on credit and established the Edwards & Broughton Printing Company on September 2. It quickly became one of the largest printers in North Carolina, and between 1887 and 1894 it did most of the printing and binding of state publications. It was formally incorporated in September 1907 and moved into a new, specially constructed building that month. By 1913 Edwards & Broughton employed nearly 100 persons and had expanded to offer engraving services. Edwards retired in 1910 and Broughton subsequently became president of their printing firm.

As the enterprise printed labor union and Farmers' Alliance publications, Broughton joined the Knights of Labor and the Alliance. On October 20, 1903, he was elected president of the North Carolina Master Printers' Association. Broughton was also a member of the North Carolina Merchants Association and the North Carolina Chamber of Commerce. For three years he and Edwards owned The Biblical Recorder and he held stock in the News and Observer Publishing Company. He occasionally contributed writings to the Recorder and to Raleigh's two daily newspapers.

== Religious activities ==
"Broughton was a very ardent Christian, and whenever there was a religious revival going on, all business had to take second place. One week Mr. Broughton left his business and went to Greensboro to take an active part in a revival being held by a Quaker woman evangelist."

— Josephus Daniels, politician and friend of Broughton

Broughton was Baptized as a Baptist in 1868. He was a member of the First Baptist Church in Raleigh. In 1874 he and J.S. Allen led several other parishioners in organizing a new congregation and purchasing a church on Swain Street, which they subsequently named Second Baptist Church. Within two years the congregation decided that a larger building was needed, so land was purchased at the corner of Hargett and Person Streets and the Tabernacle Baptist Church was established. Broughton was made a deacon and appointed superintendent of its Sunday school. In the late 1890s he was made vice-president of the Sunday School Board of the Southern Baptist Convention (SBC) and a member of the executive committee of the International Sunday School Association. He held all three positions until 1913. In those capacities he attended numerous international Sunday school conferences, including a world convention in Rome. He also served as secretary of the SBC for approximately 30 years and acted as a lay preacher.

== Involvement in public affairs ==
Broughton staunchly supported public education and was an avid supporter of the Chautauqua movement. He served as the first chairman of the board of Raleigh's public schools. In the 1888 he successfully lobbied for a property tax increase to save the city's schools from bankruptcy. Broughton also pressed for Meredith College and the North Carolina Agricultural and Mechanic College to be located in Raleigh. He served as a trustee of both schools, as well as of Wake Forest College, the Oxford Orphan Asylum, and the State School for the Deaf, Dumb and the Blind, and was a member of National Religious Training School and Chautauqua for the Colored Race's advisory board.

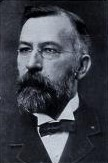
Broughton circa. 1910

Due to his religious beliefs, Broughton was a member of the temperance movement and a strong supporter of the prohibition of the sale and consumption of alcohol. For five years he was Grand Chief Templar of the North Carolina Order of Good Templars. In 1887 he convinced African Methodist Episcopal Zion bishop James Walker Hood to appeal to blacks to support a Raleigh referendum banning alcohol. Nevertheless, the electorate rejected the proposed restriction. Broughton was elected president of the North Carolina Anti-Saloon League in 1902. The following year he appealed to Raleigh's black leaders to join whites in a campaign against "Sin and Satan" and improve the morality of their race, chiefly by supporting temperance. He told Charles N. Hunter, a prominent black educator, that by rejecting alcohol, black voters could prove themselves to be responsible citizens, despite their disenfranchisement. Having been persuaded by Broughton, Hunter appealed to blacks to vote to remove saloons from Raleigh. A local referendum to ban the establishments succeeded, with most black voters' support. Broughton's wider advocacy was also ultimately successful; in 1908 a statewide referendum approved a ban of the sale of alcohol, though the residents of Wake County had voted against it. However, the state lost revenue generated by liquor taxes, temporarily jeopardizing the funding of public education. Despite collaborating with blacks on temperance, Broughton supported white supremacy. In 1870 he suggested that the Raleigh Typographical Union modify its rules to prevent black men from joining it.

In 1889 Broughton was appointed by the governor to the North Carolina Board of Agriculture. He served as chairman of its finance committee. Broughton ran on the Democratic Party's ticket in 1896 in the Wake County constituency for a seat in the North Carolina House of Representatives. He was defeated by incumbent James H. Young by a slim margin. (Note: According to Haley, Broughton was defeated by two votes. Craig put the margin at 10 votes.) In June 1900 he was nominated by the Democratic Party in a Wake County convention to the Wake County seat for the North Carolina Senate on the fourth ballot. He accepted the nomination to prevent it from being taken by an anti-prohibition candidate. His decision was made at the behest of fellow temperance supporter Josephus Daniels, who disliked the local Democratic political machine's pro-alcohol stance. Broughton's candidacy outraged the machine members, who, mindful of his popularity among white Christians, felt the issue of prohibition would divide their electoral support after the Democratic Party had only recently regained control of the state government. Daniels reached a compromise with the machine's leaders, whereby they would support Broughton if Daniels did not try to pass a prohibition bill through the legislature. Broughton was thus elected to the office, serving from 1901 until 1903.

When nominated for the state Senate, Broughton described how proud he was of the nomination and expressed confidence that “we are speedily coming to the day when white men and white men only will rule in North Carolina.” Once elected, Broughton joined Robert Nirwana Simms in nominating Furnifold Simmons, the architect of the Democrats’ White Supremacy Campaign, for the United States Senate. In separate speeches in the state House and Senate, Broughton praised Simmons for having “forever settled negroism in North Carolina” which Simms credited to the nominee’s ability to move “the Anglo-Saxon manhood of the state [to] the high and holy purpose to throw off forever the galling yoke of negro domination.” Broughton did not seek reelection.

== Death and legacy ==
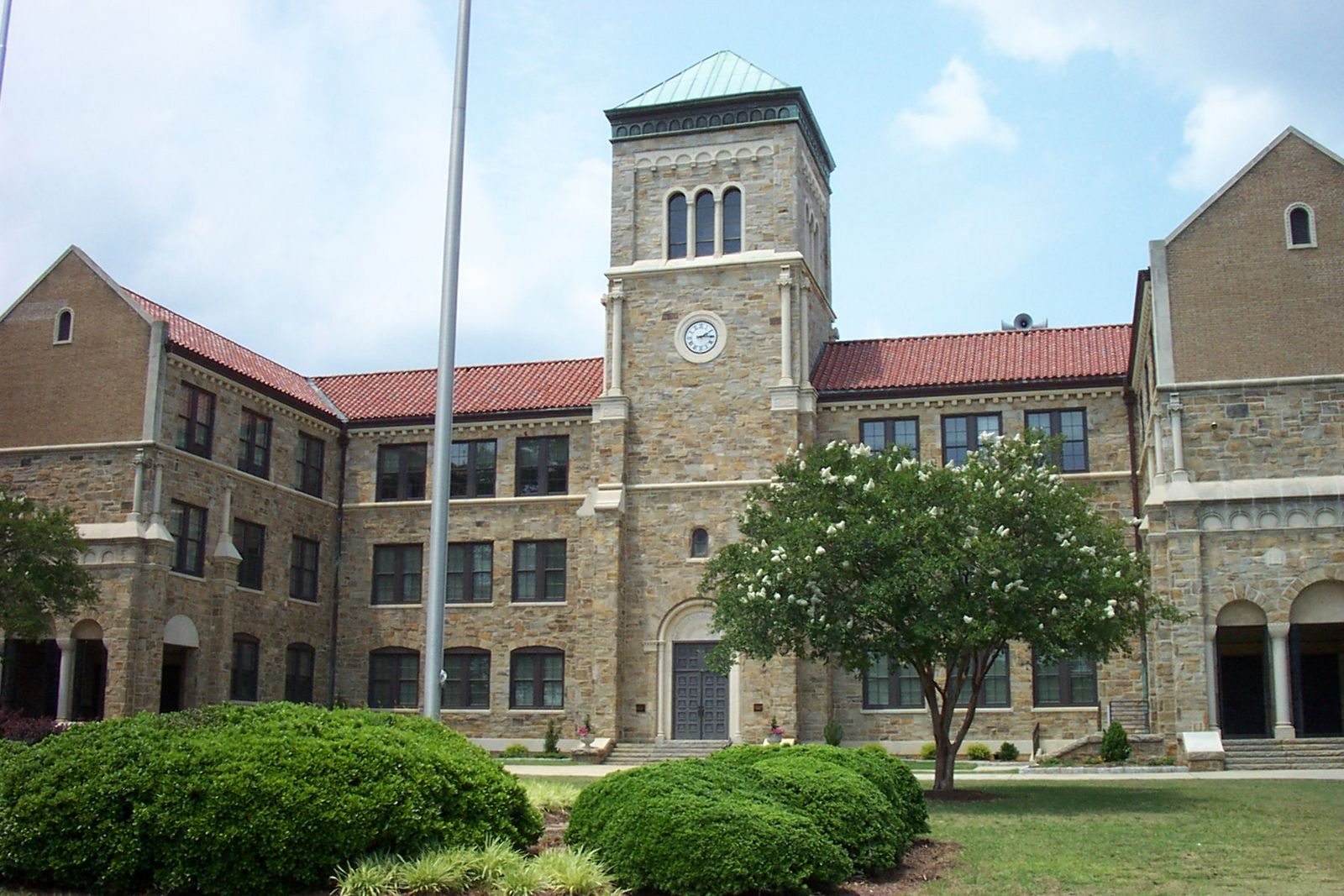
Needham B. Broughton High School in 2007

Broughton fell ill in 1913 and retired from public life. He died on May 26, 1914, in a hospital in Philadelphia, survived by his wife and children. He was buried in the Historic Oakwood Cemetery in Raleigh. Years after Broughton's death, C. B. Edwards sent a letter to the Raleigh Public School Board, requesting that the new high school in Raleigh—then without a name—be named for Broughton in honor of his service to public education in the city. The dedication ceremony for Needham B. Broughton High School took place in 1930, towards the end of the school year. His daughter, Carrie Lougee Broughton, became the first woman in North Carolina to hold statewide office as state librarian. His nephew, J. Melville Broughton, served as Governor of North Carolina, while another, Len G. Broughton, became an active Baptist minister. Alcohol remained prohibited in North Carolina until 1935.
