= Carrie Lougee Broughton =

American librarian

State Librarian of North Carolina
- Appointed; May 31, 1918 – 1956
- Preceded by: Miles O. Sherrill

Personal details
- Born: September 16, 1879 Raleigh, North Carolina, U.S.
- Died: January 29, 1957 (aged 77) Raleigh, North Carolina, U.S.
- Resting place: Historic Oakwood Cemetery
- Party: Democratic
- Parent(s): Needham B. Broughton; Caroline R. Lougee
- Relatives: J. Melville Broughton (cousin) Alice Willson Broughton (cousin-in-law)
- Education: Peace Institute
- Alma mater: Meredith College; State Normal and Industrial College
- Occupation: librarian

Carrie Lougee Broughton (September 16, 1879 – January 29, 1957) was an American librarian who served as the fourth State Librarian of North Carolina from 1918 to 1956. She was the first woman to serve as State Librarian and the first woman to serve as the head of a state government department in North Carolina.

== Early life and education ==
Broughton was born in Raleigh, North Carolina, on September 16, 1879, to Caroline R. Lougee and Needham B. Broughton, a businessman and politician who served in the North Carolina State Senate. She was raised in the Southern Baptist tradition and attended Tabernacle Baptist Church. Broughton was a first cousin of North Carolina Governor and U.S. Senator J. Melville Broughton and Baptist minister and medical doctor Len G. Broughton. Broughton was educated in Raleigh public schools and attended the Peace Institute and Meredith College in Raleigh and the State Normal and Industrial College in Greensboro.

== Career ==
Broughton was a member of the Democratic Party. She was appointed Assistant State Librarian at the State Library of North Carolina in September 1902, succeeding Marshall De Lancey Haywood. The state librarian, Miles O. Sherrill, retired in 1917 and was succeeded by a series of men named as acting state librarians. The naming of a woman to the post was not initially considered by trustees Governor Thomas Walter Bickett, Secretary of State J. Bryan Grimes, and Superintendent of Public Instruction J. Y. Joyner. Broughton was endorsed by the president of the State Federation of Women's Clubs, the North Carolina Library Commission, the North Carolina Library Association, as well as the librarians of Meredith College, Wake Forest College, Trinity College, Davidson College, and the State Normal and Industrial College. Walter Clark, Chief Justice of the North Carolina Supreme Court, wrote a letter to the trustees stating, "It is true, as someone has said, she is guilty of 'the atrocious crime of being a woman,' but she is a taxpayer, a good citizen, experienced and thoroughly competent. I have found nothing in the constitution of this State which forbids a woman to be appointed to any office." On May 31, 1918, Broughton was appointed in interim due to the North Carolina General Assembly being out of session. She was officially appointed as the fourth State Librarian on March 13, 1919, becoming the first woman to serve as the head of a state department in North Carolina.

As state librarian, Broughton organized the Secretary of State's collection into a research collection for government officials, writers, and scholars. She started a genealogical collection through the State Library's Department of Cultural Resources. With her chief assistant, Pauline Hill, she compiled a fifty-eight page bibliography titled Genealogical Materials in the North Carolina State Library for the Biennial Report of the State Librarian of North Carolina for 1 July 1926 – 30 June 1928, which covered descendants of, as well as the marriages and deaths of, early North Carolinians. Starting in 1944, her genealogical reports collection also included marriages and death notices from 1799 to 1825 as published in the Raleigh Register. She also included marriages and deaths from the 19th century as published by the North Carolina State Gazette.

Broughton served as state librarian until her retirement in 1956.

== Death ==
On January 29, 1957, six months after her retirement, Broughton died from an illness. She was buried in Historic Oakwood Cemetery.

== Works cited ==
- North Carolina Manual. Raleigh: North Carolina Secretary of State. 1955. OCLC 17672030.
