= Neill–Turner–Lester House =

Historic house in North Carolina, United States

- Neill-Turner-Lester House
- U.S. National Register of Historic Places
- Location within North Carolina Location within the United States
- Location: North side of SR 1836, 0.25 miles (0.40 km) northeast of the junction with SR 1837, near Sherrills Ford, North Carolina
- Coordinates: 35°38′59″N 80°57′48″W
- Area: less than one acre
- Built: c. 1820, 1889
- Architect: Lester, Charles Henry
- Architectural style: Italianate, Federal
- MPS: Catawba County MPS
- NRHP reference No.: 90000742
- Added to NRHP: May 10, 1990

Neill–Turner–Lester House, also known as Five Oaks and the Neill-Lester House, is a historic home located near Sherrills Ford, Catawba County, North Carolina. It was built about 1820, and is a two-story, frame dwelling. It was remodeled and enlarged in 1889 in the Italianate style. The interior retains Federal style design elements from its original construction.

It was listed on the National Register of Historic Places in 1990.
