= Louis Rémy Mignot =

American painter

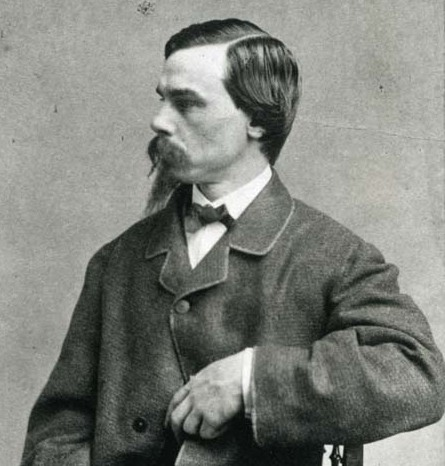
- Louis Rémy Mignot
- Born: February 3, 1831; Charleston, South Carolina, United States
- Died: September 22, 1870 (aged 39); Brighton, England

Louis Rémy Mignot (February 3, 1831 – September 22, 1870) was an American painter of French Catholic descent. Associated with the Hudson River School of landscape artists, his southern US heritage and the influence of his time spent in Europe gave him a distinct style within that group, in painting vegetation and atmospheric effects.

Mignot's parents came to the US from France after the Bourbon Restoration in 1815. Mignot pursued his interest in art in Europe beginning in 1848, and spent much of his life outside the US. Starting in 1850 he worked for four years in Andreas Schelfhout's studio in The Hague, Netherlands, then travelled in Europe. Returning to New York City, he soon travelled with artist Frederic Edwin Church to Ecuador in 1857, gathering material for his paintings of the tropics, the subject of a large portion of his subsequent work. In 1858 he had a studio at the Tenth Street Studio Building in New York City. The next year the National Academy of Design, where he had first exhibited in 1853, elected him as an associate, and in 1860 he became an academician. He collaborated with painters Eastman Johnson and John W. Ehninger, who provided figures for his landscapes, and Thomas Rossiter, whose history paintings of Mount Vernon benefitted from Mignot's landscapes.

With the outbreak of the American Civil War, he raised money with a sale of his paintings, then sailed to England in June 1862, where he lived in London. His exhibitions at the Royal Academy between 1863 and 1871 were warmly received. His work was shown at the 1870 Paris Salon. He died in England of smallpox in 1870, shortly after fleeing France due to the Franco-Prussian War.

In 1996, the North Carolina Museum of Art held an exhibition of Mignot's work, the result of five years of research by John W. Coffey, a curator at the museum, which led to the discovery of dozens of Mignot's paintings. He co-authored an exhibition catalogue with Katherine E. Manthorne, and the exhibition, "Louis Remy Mignot: A Southern Painter Abroad", toured to the National Academy of Design in 1997. This led to a reassessment of Mignot's work, with one academic specializing in American painting of the era rating him as highly as Church in the pantheon of nineteenth-century American artists.

== Gallery ==
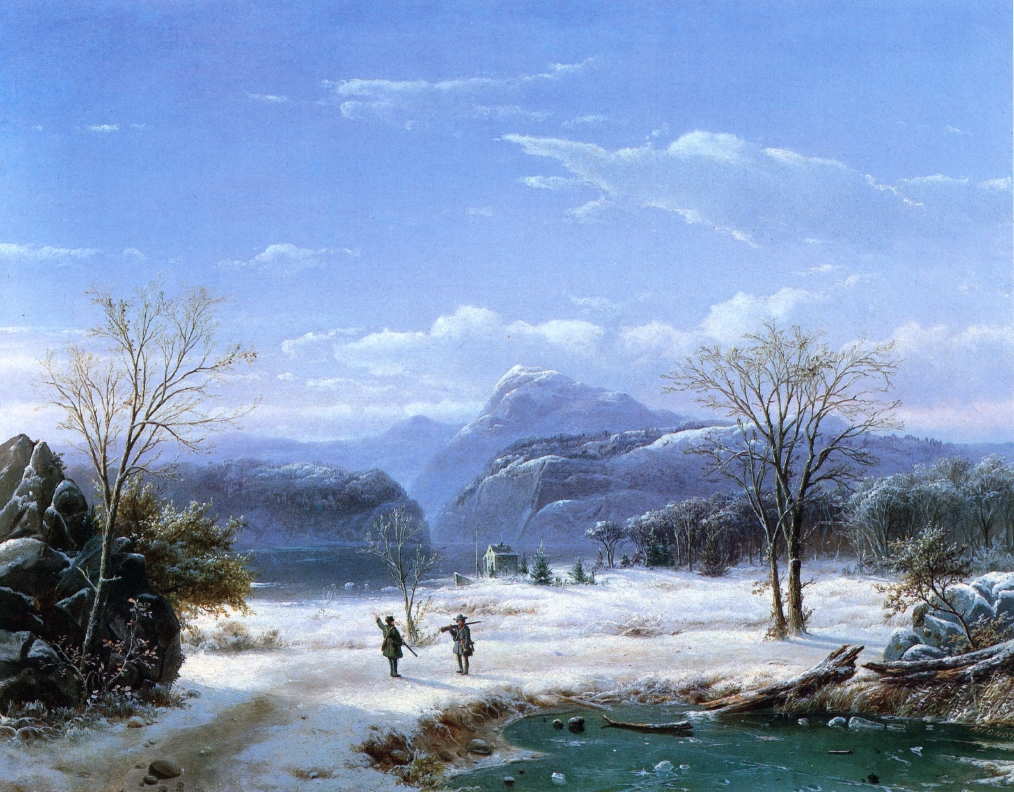
Hunters in a Winter Landscape (1856)

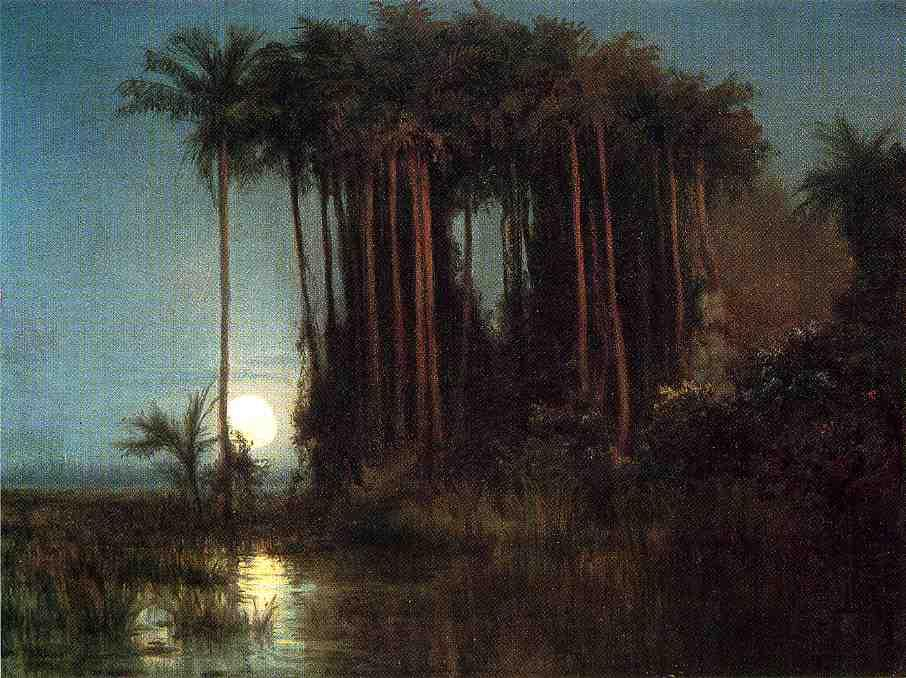
Moonlight over a Marsh in Ecuador (1858)

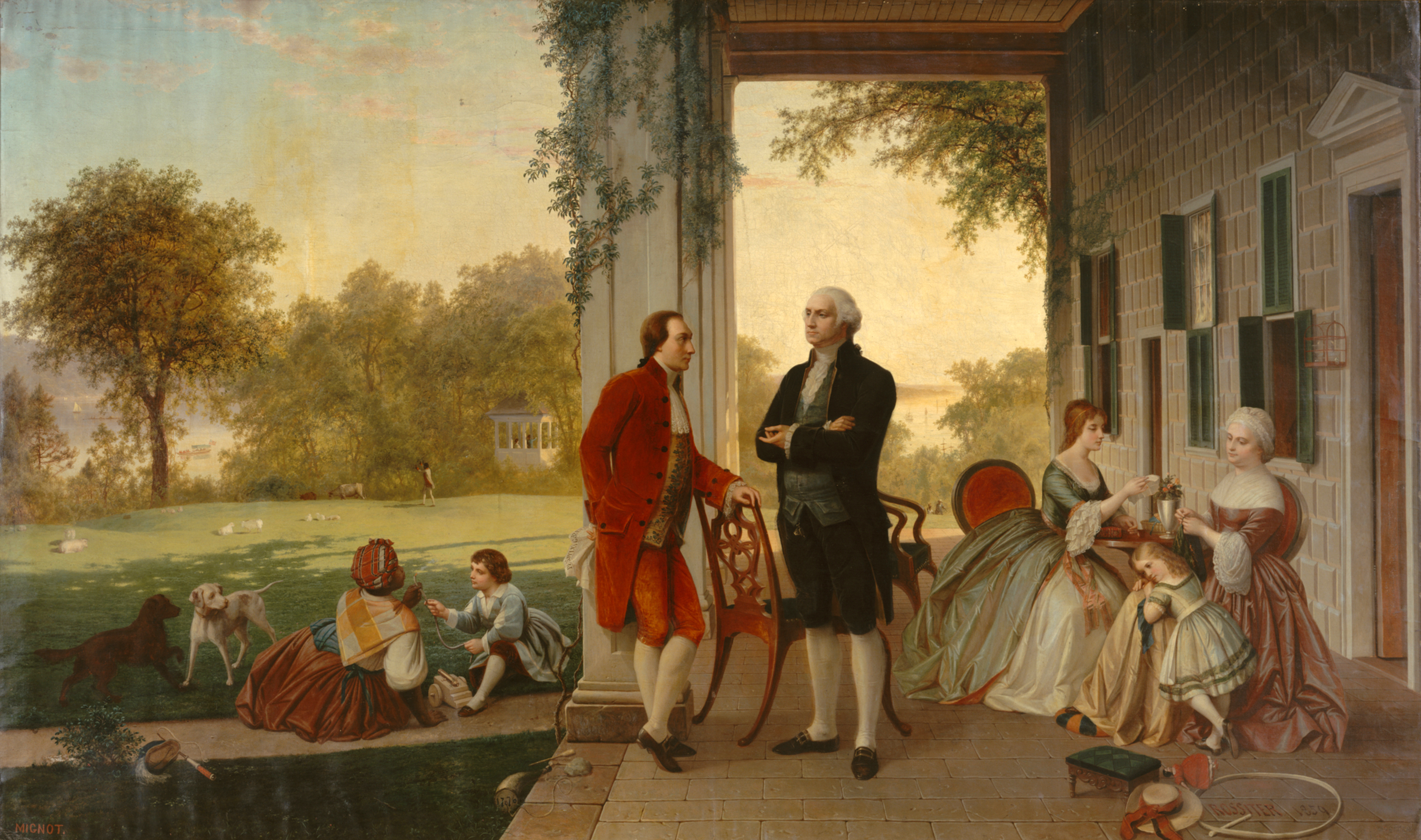
Washington and Lafayette at Mount Vernon, 1784 (The Home of Washington after the War) (1859), Metropolitan Museum of Art, New York

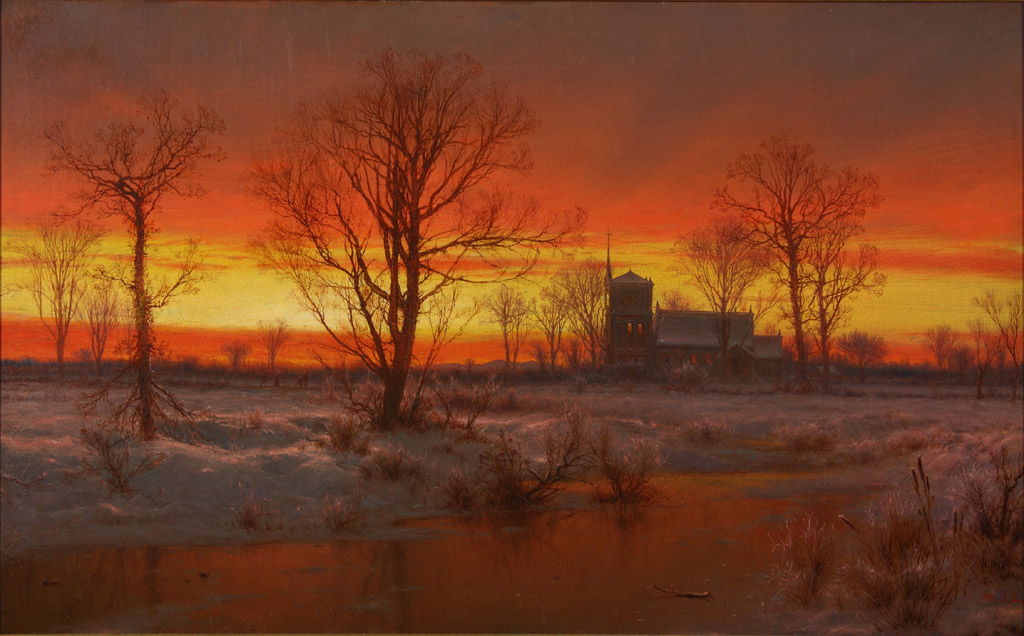
Sunset, Winter (1862),
High Museum of Art, Atlanta

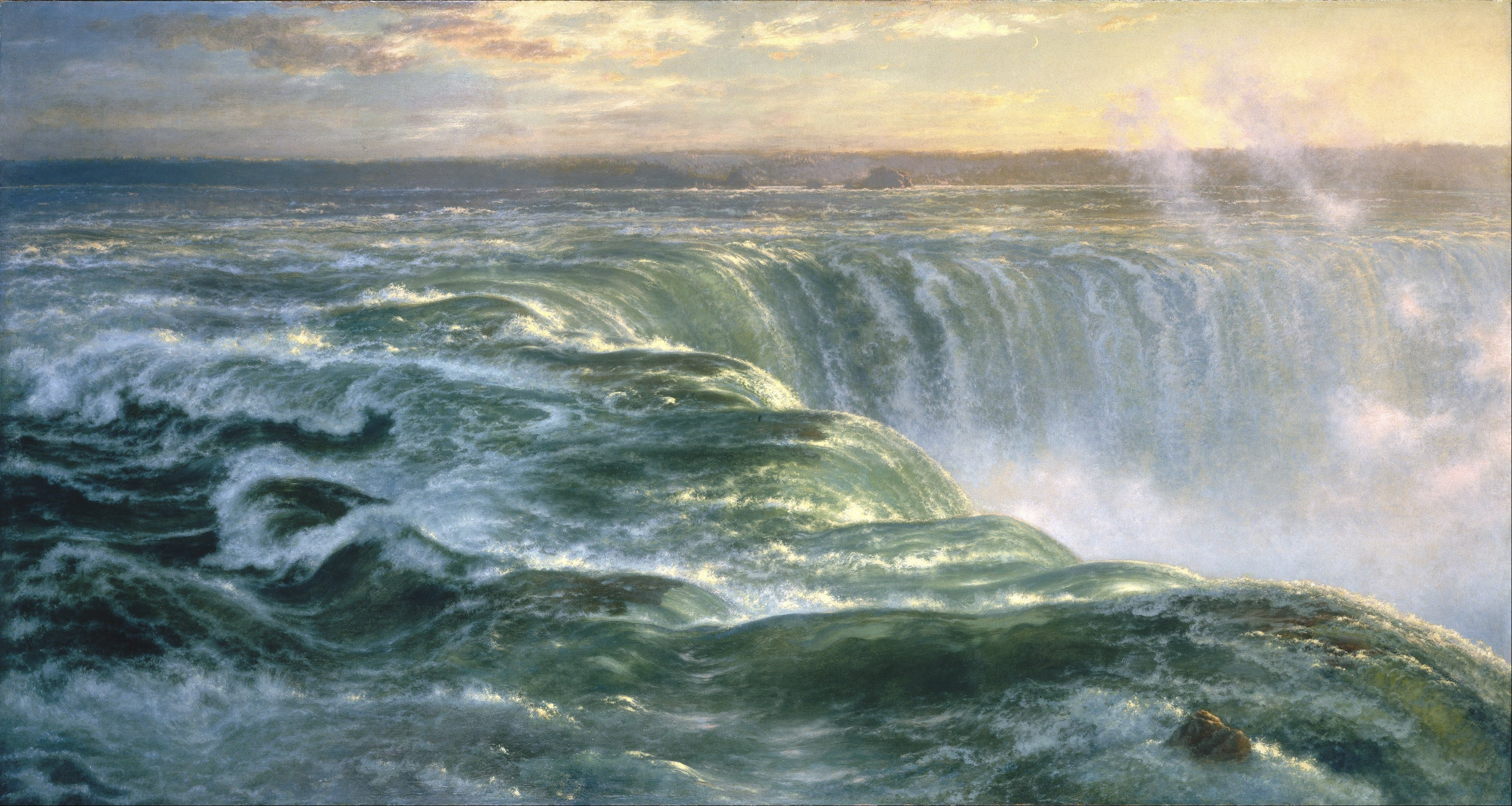
Niagara (1866),
Brooklyn Museum, New York

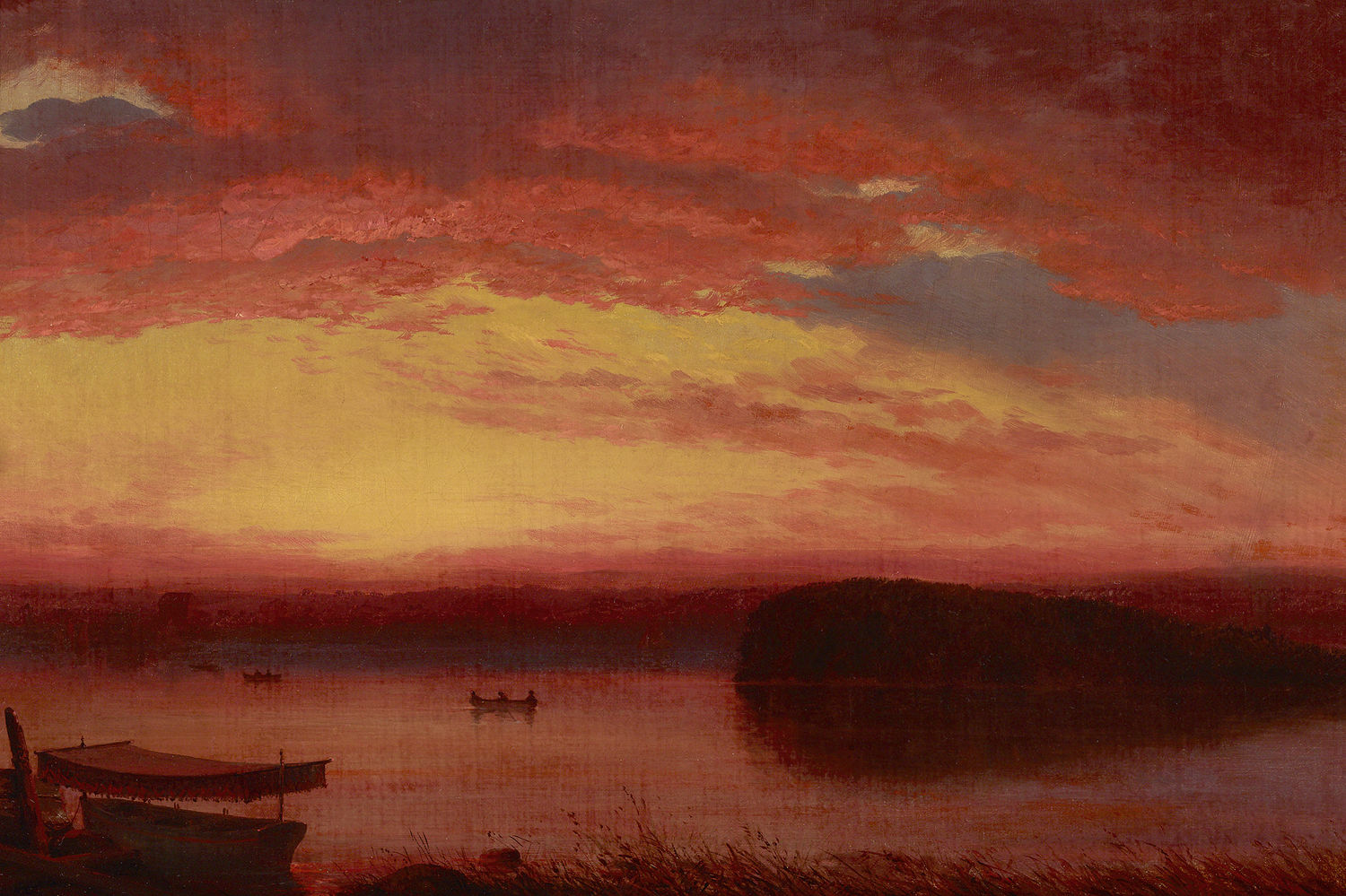
Sunset on Lake George (1860), Private Collection
