= Miles Alexander Sherrill House =

Historic house in North Carolina, United States

- U.S. National Register of Historic Places
- Location within North Carolina Location within the United States
- Location: West side of SR 1849, 0.1 miles (0.16 km) south of SR 1848 junction, near Sherrills Ford, North Carolina
- Coordinates: 35°37′37″N 81°0′28″W
- Area: 4.8 acres (1.9 ha)
- Built: 1886
- Architect: Lester, Charles H.
- Architectural style: Stick/eastlake
- MPS: Catawba County MPS
- NRHP reference No.: 90000665
- Added to NRHP: April 27, 1990

Miles Alexander Sherrill House is a historic home located near Sherrills Ford, Catawba County, North Carolina. It was built in 1886, and is a two-story, frame Stick style dwelling. It features irregular massing, steeply pitched gable and shed roofs, and German siding with an overlay of vertical and horizontal boards.

It was listed on the National Register of Historic Places in 1990.
