= Clarence O. Sherrill =

American military officer, city manager, and lobbyist (1876–1959)

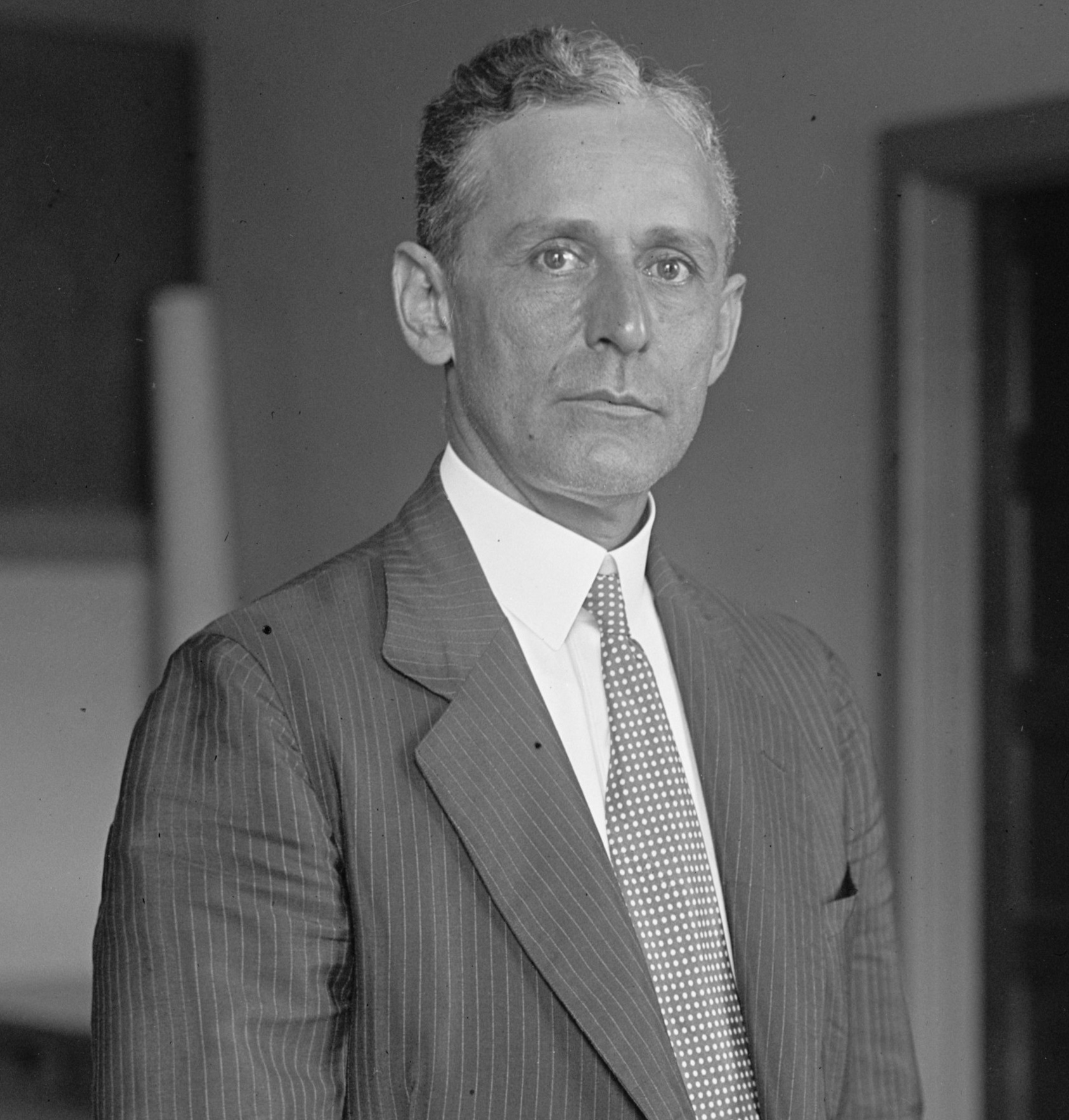
- Clarence O. Sherrill in 1927
- Born: Clarence Osborne Sherrill; May 24, 1876; Newton, North Carolina
- Died: February 6, 1959 (aged 82); Cincinnati, Ohio
- Burial place: Arlington National Cemetery
- Education: Catawba College; Trinity College; United States Military Academy; School of the Line
- Spouse: Geraldine Caldwell Taylor (m. 1905–1957)
- Children: Clarence Caldwell; Minnie Elizabeth
- Military career
- Branch: U.S. Army Corps of Engineers
- Service years: 1901–1926
- Rank: Colonel
- Units: 29th Infantry Division; 77th Infantry Division
- Awards: Croix de Guerre; Distinguished Service Medal

Signature
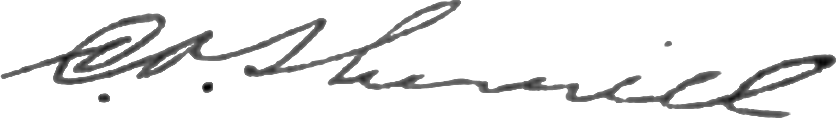

Clarence O. Sherrill (May 24, 1876 – February 6, 1959) was an American military officer, city manager, and lobbyist. The son of a North Carolina politician and Civil War veteran, Sherrill attended colleges in his home state before transferring to the United States Military Academy (West Point), graduating with a degree in civil engineering. During the next decade, Sherrill briefly served as a military aide to President Theodore Roosevelt and was stationed in the Philippines and several U.S. cities. During World War I, Sherrill was stationed in France where he led the 302d Engineers. He was promoted to lieutenant colonel and awarded the Croix de Guerre and Distinguished Service Medal.

In 1921, Sherrill moved to Washington, D.C., where he served as chief military aide to President Warren G. Harding and later President Calvin Coolidge. He was appointed director of the Office of Public Buildings and Grounds, overseeing a large number of departments and construction projects. When one of these projects, the Lincoln Memorial, was dedicated, Sherrill was responsible for having the audience segregated. He implemented this racist policy in various parks, public pools, and golf courses throughout the city. He retired from the military and left his role in Washington, D.C., in 1925, then moved to Ohio, where he served as Cincinnati's first city manager. In the 1930s, Sherrill was vice president of the Kroger Grocery and Baking Company and president of the American Retail Federation (later merged into the National Retail Federation). He later resumed his role as city manager of Cincinnati and retired in 1944. Sherrill and his wife, Gerladine, had two children. The couple died in the 1950s and were buried in Arlington National Cemetery.

== Early life ==
Clarence Osborne Sherrill was born on May 24, 1876, in Newton, North Carolina, the third of seven children. His younger sister, Mary Lura Sherrill, became a prominent chemist and his older brother, Joseph Garland Sherrill, helped found the American College of Surgeons. His mother was Sarah Ramseur Bost and his father, Miles Osborne Sherrill, was a Civil War veteran who had lost a leg at the Battle of Spotsylvania Court House. After the war, his father was a clerk of court in Catawba County, a member of the North Carolina House of Representatives and North Carolina Senate, and state librarian from 1899 to 1916.

Sherrill attended Catawba College before enrolling at Trinity College (now Duke University). He left Trinity in 1897 to attend the United States Military Academy (West Point), where he graduated at the rank of second lieutenant in 1901 with a degree in civil engineering, second in his class. After graduating, Sherrill was stationed as an engineer in the Philippines, assisting with the construction of roads, bridges, and wharves. He was promoted to first lieutenant in 1903 and moved to Washington, D.C., serving as a military aide to President Theodore Roosevelt for one year. In 1904, Sherrill attended the School of the Line (now the United States Army Command and General Staff College) at Fort Leavenworth, where he took infantry and cavalry courses for officers until graduating in 1906 with honors. After his promotion to captain, Sherrill taught at the School of the Line for three years and wrote a military text book on topography. In 1911, he served as chief engineer at Fort Crockett in Galveston, Texas, followed by stints in Mobile, Alabama, and New Orleans.

In 1914, Sherrill was promoted to major in the United States Army Corps of Engineers. When the United States entered World War I, Sherrill was stationed in France, where he led the 302d Engineers and served as chief of staff of the 29th and 77th Infantry Divisions. For his service, Sherrill was promoted to lieutenant colonel and awarded the Croix de Guerre and Distinguished Service Medal.

== Career ==
=== Washington, D.C. ===
In 1921, Sherrill was appointed chief military aide to President Warren G. Harding, a role he continued during the early years of Calvin Coolidge's presidency. While also serving as military aide, Sherrill was appointed director of the Office of Public Buildings and Grounds, beginning in March 1921. In this role, Sherrill was responsible for a large number of projects and departments. He was involved with planning the construction of several prominent sites in Washington, D.C., including the Lincoln Memorial, the Ulysses S. Grant Memorial, the George Gordon Meade Memorial, the Titanic Memorial, and the Arlington Memorial Bridge. In addition to these projects, an article in The New York Times described Sherrill's enormous list of responsibilities, including upkeep of the White House, the State, War, and Navy Building, and other government buildings.

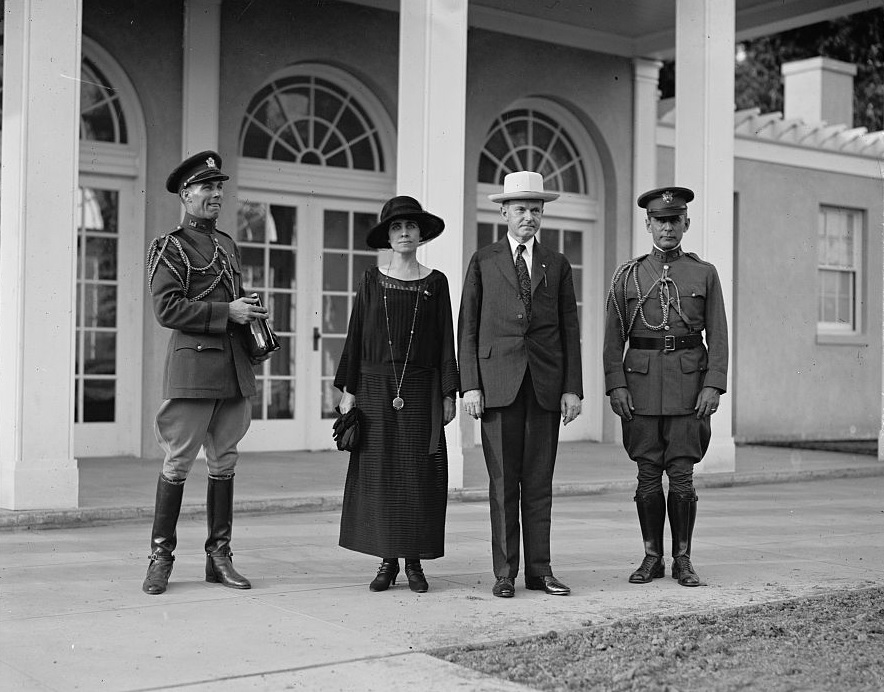
Oscar Solbert, U.S. President Calvin Coolidge, First Lady Grace Coolidge, and Sherrill in 1924

He was nicknamed the "Czar of Washington" by U.S. Representative Thomas L. Blanton, who was a critic of Sherrill's influence in the city. Blanton spent $260 to print and deliver a 27-page pamphlet to a large number of residents which criticized Sherrill. Blanton wrote that Sherrill presides "arrogantly and pompously as the sole and exclusive dictator, lawmaker, law enforcer, contract letter, concession granter, employee hirer, employee discharger, money disburser, judge, jury and executioner from whose iron decree there is no way of escape." The feud had apparently begun after Blanton criticized Sherrill's management skills which in return Sherrill called him a "busybody."

In addition to the aforementioned projects, Sherrill played a large role in development of the Rock Creek and Potomac Parkway, which was under his jurisdiction as overseer of Rock Creek Park. He also served as secretary of the United States Commission of Fine Arts and executive officer of the National Capital Park Commission The Office of Public Buildings and Grounds was abolished by Congress in 1925 and replaced with the Office of Public Buildings and Public Parks of the National Capital, which Sherrill oversaw.

As the person who oversaw a large number of local projects and agencies, Sherrill was able to implement racist policies without much pushback. According to historian and author Eric S. Yellin, Sherrill was an "avid segregationist" and was responsible for segregating the dedication ceremony of the Lincoln Memorial. Sherrill also implemented segregation policies in the city's parks, pools, and picnic areas, by requiring installation of signs that said "white" and "colored". An article in The Durham Morning Herald reported: "Negroes in the District of Columbia have requested President Harding to remove Col. C. O. Sherrill, aide to the president, because the latter is charged with segregating the races at public gatherings in Washington." Although some members of Congress were able to step in and have some of Sherrill's policies reversed, Harding did not remove him from office.

Some of the middle-class black residents of the city agreed to Sherrill's policy of only letting them play on two of the city's golf courses at specific times. The Baltimore Afro-American published an article urging them "to remove every vestige of discrimination and to get rid of Colonel Sherrill", and that by adhering to this policy, it would "put [Sherrill] in position to say that he is giving the colored people what they want." One local black resident, Hattie Sewell, had won a contract to operate the Pierce Mill Tea House in Rock Creek Park. Her business was successful, but a local white resident who wanted "an experienced white person" to run the tea house convinced Sherrill to not renew Sewell's lease. Sherrill obliged and the lease was given to the Girl Scouts Association. Sherrill also had signs posted around Peirce Mill that segregated the area, but these were removed after the local NAACP protested. Sherrill's tenure as head of local parks and public buildings ended in December 1925 when he retired from the Army and was succeeded by Ulysses S. Grant III.

=== Cincinnati ===
Sherrill left Washington, D.C., to work as the first city manager of Cincinnati, Ohio. He served in this role from 1926 to 1930, earning $25,000 per year. After Grant III declined to take over the role when Sherrill left, Clarence Addison Dykstra was named the new city manager. Sherrill worked as vice president of the Kroger Grocery and Baking Company from 1930 to 1935, assisting with the company's advancements in supply chain management. His military background and success at Kroger was the inspiration for a character in Once an Eagle, a novel by Anton Myrer.

Sherrill left Kroger to co-found the American Retail Federation (later merged into the National Retail Federation) with lobbyist Harold R. Young and Filene's chairman Louis E. Kirstein. Sherrill served as the organization's president, and according to academic author Michael J. Hicks, was instrumental in thwarting attempts to stop the "anti-chain store movement" by utilizing advertisements and placards. Hicks believes Sherrill's strategies were probably used years later by Walmart when that company rapidly expanded. Sherrill left the American Retail Federation to return as city manager of Cincinnati, working in this role from 1937 until his retirement in 1944.

== Personal life ==
While studying at the School of the Line, Sherrill married Geraldine Caldwell Taylor, granddaughter of former U.S. Senator Alexander Caldwell, on November 30, 1905. The couple had two children, Clarence Caldwell, born August 15, 1911, and Minnie Elizabeth, born January 27, 1916. Sherrill was a member of the Army and Navy Club, Chevy Chase Club, Queen City Club, University Club of Cincinnati, and Cincinnati Country Club. His wife was a board member of the Washington Home for Incurables. She died on May 31, 1957, at The Christ Hospital in Cincinnati, and was buried in a shared plot at Arlington National Cemetery. Sherrill died on February 6, 1959, at The Christ Hospital and was buried alongside his wife in Section 6, Grave 9542-1. Sherrill Drive in Rock Creek Park is named in his honor.
