= Matthew Broughton =

English footballer

Personal information
- Full name: Matthew Broughton
- Date of birth: 8 October 1880
- Place of birth: Grantham, England
- Date of death: 1957 (aged 76–77)
- Position: Winger

Senior career*
| Years | Team | Apps | (Gls) |
| 1900–1901 | Grantham Avenue | | |
| 1901–1903 | Nottingham Forest | 27 | (5) |
| 1903–1904 | Grantham | | |
| 1904–1905 | Notts County | 2 | (1) |
| 1905 | Watford | | |
| 1905 | Grantham | | |
| Total | | 29 | (6) |
- * Club domestic league appearances and goals

Matthew Broughton (8 October 1880–1957) was an English footballer who played in the Football League for Nottingham Forest and Notts County.
