= Carl James =

American collegiate sports executive

Carl C. James (September 18, 1925 – July 3, 2004) was an American collegiate sports executive. He was the commissioner of the Big Eight Conference from 1980 through 1996.

== Early life and education ==
A native of Raleigh, N.C., he graduated from Duke University. He earned seven varsity letters in football and track and field between 1949 and 1951.

== Career ==
James was an athletic director at the University of Maryland and Duke University. In 1980, he became commissioner of the Big Eight Conference and retired from the role in 1996. He helped expand the program by adding four schools and making it the Big 12 Conference.

== Personal life ==
James married Marjorie Pettit. They had two daughters. He died on July 3, 2004, at his home in Cornelius, North Carolina.

== Awards and honors ==
- 1996: James J. Corbett Memorial Award
