= Adam Sherrill =

Early European settler in North Carolina (1697–1774)

- Born: 1697
- Died: May 4, 1774 (aged 76–77)
- Spouse: Elizabeth Corzine
- Children: 9

Adam Sherrill, or Adam "The Pioneer" Sherrill (1697 – May 4, 1774), was the first European to permanently settle on the west side of the Catawba River in North Carolina.

== Childhood and marriage ==
Adam Sherrill was the son of William Sherrill, known as the "Conestoga Fur Trader", who was believed to be the son of Samuel Sherrill of Cornwood. William Sherrill had six children. His wife's name remains unknown despite much searching on the part of many genealogists.

In 1722 Sherrill married "Elizabeth". Her surname is Corzine. Soon after their marriage, they lived in West Donegal Township, southern Lancaster County, Pennsylvania until about 1735. Adam then followed his father and brother to western Maryland until about 1740–41, after which he moved to the southern end of newly formed Augusta County, Virginia. After finding out that his land was not in Augusta County when the line was surveyed in 1746, Adam left Virginia in 1747 and migrated to North Carolina where he became the first European to settle on the west side of the Catawba River.

== Children ==
Adam and Elizabeth had nine children, eight sons and one daughter. The children were: William B.; Samuel; Uriah; Adam Jr.; Aquilla; Isaac; Jacob; Moses; and Catherine Rebecca.

== Fording the Catawba River ==
In 1747, Adam and his family moved from Virginia and became the first Europeans to permanently settle on the west side of the Catawba River in North Carolina. Adam spent two days scouting the river when he crossed it at a shallow area thereafter called Sherrill's Ford (located just north of modern-day Charlotte). Adam's later received a land patent in 1749 on acreage located on the west bank of the Catawba River.

Adam had an advantage that other early settlers didn't, which was that he spent several years of his childhood living with the native Susquehanna Tribe near Conestoga, Pennsylvania. The Susquehanna spoke an Iroquoian dialect, and Adam became fluent in the language. Later in life, the area Adam settled in the west of the Catawba River was populated by the Cherokee and Catawba tribes, who also spoke an Iroquoian dialect. Certainly, understanding the customs and language of the native inhabitants was a huge advantage to Adam. In fact, Adam apparently negotiated a lease with the Cherokee that allowed him to stay while other settlers were harassed or even killed.

For perspective, it was over two decades after Adam settled at Sherrill's Ford that a town called "Charlottesburg" was founded about 10 miles (16 km) to the south. This settlement later grew into the modern metropolis that is Charlotte.

== Will ==
Adam Sherrill wrote his will on March 5, 1772. It states:

In the name of God, Amen, I, ADAM SHERRILL of the County of Rowan and the province of North Carolina being in perfect health and memory, praised be God, do make this my last will and testament as followeth:

I give and bequeath unto my son ADAM, one Negro fellow, called and known by the name of Vail to him and his heirs forever after my decease.

I give and bequeath unto my son QUILLAR one Negro after my decease if either one, besides Vail, and in case I should have no others after my decease.

I give unto my son QUILLAR thirty pounds in lieu therefore to be raised out of my estate after my decease to him and his heirs.

I give and bequeath unto my son WILLIAM SHERRILL one of the best horses or mares that I posses at my decease to him and his heirs forever.

The true intent and meaning of this, my last will is that no other will make by me or any other in my name shall disannul this my last will.

I do appoint my two sons, ADAM and QUILLAR executors of this my last will and Testament.

5 March 1772 Adam Sherrill

The witnesses of this will are: James Clark, Jr.; Abraham Roberson, Jr.; and William Berry.

== Death ==
Adam died May 4, 1774. His sons Samuel and William later fought in the Revolutionary War at the Battle of Kings Mountain, along with several of their sons.

== Sources ==
- "Adam 'The Pioneer' Sherrill" - Loftin
- "SHERRILLS FORD NAMED FOR CATAWBA PIONEER, ADAM SHERRILL CROSSED RIVER IN 1747 AND BUILT HOMESTEAD ON WEST BANK" - Charlotte Observer
- "Bundle up for a cold one this winter, but very little snow" - Crossville Chronicle
- "VOLUNTEERS WORKING TO SAVE THE PAST FOR THE FUTURE" - Charlotte Observer
- "DENVER'S FIRST NAME: DRY POND" - Charlotte Observer
- "National Register of Historic Places" - North Carolina State Historic Preservation Office
- "The Overmountain Men" by Pat Alderman
