= State Library of North Carolina =

Library

Coordinates: 35.7828°N 78.6371°W

Library of North Carolina

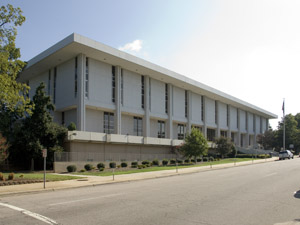

Agency overview
- Formed: 1812
- Preceding agency: State Library of North Carolina
- Jurisdiction: State of North Carolina
- Headquarters: 109 East Jones Street Raleigh, NC 27699-4601
- Agency executive: Michelle Underhill
- Parent agency: North Carolina Department of Natural and Cultural Resources
- Website: library.nc.gov

The Library of North Carolina, formerly the State Library of North Carolina, serves North Carolina libraries, state government employees, and citizens. The library is the main depository for North Carolina state publications and serves North Carolina government agencies and employees by providing access to information resources pertinent to public decision-making and economic development.

The Library of North Carolina is a division of the North Carolina Department of Natural and Cultural Resources, an agency that promotes and protects North Carolina’s arts, history, and culture.

The library has two locations in the state capital, Raleigh. The main building is located on East Jones Street next to the North Carolina State Legislative Building and near the North Carolina Museum of History and the North Carolina Museum of Natural Sciences. The Library for the Blind and Physically Handicapped is located on Capital Boulevard.

== History ==
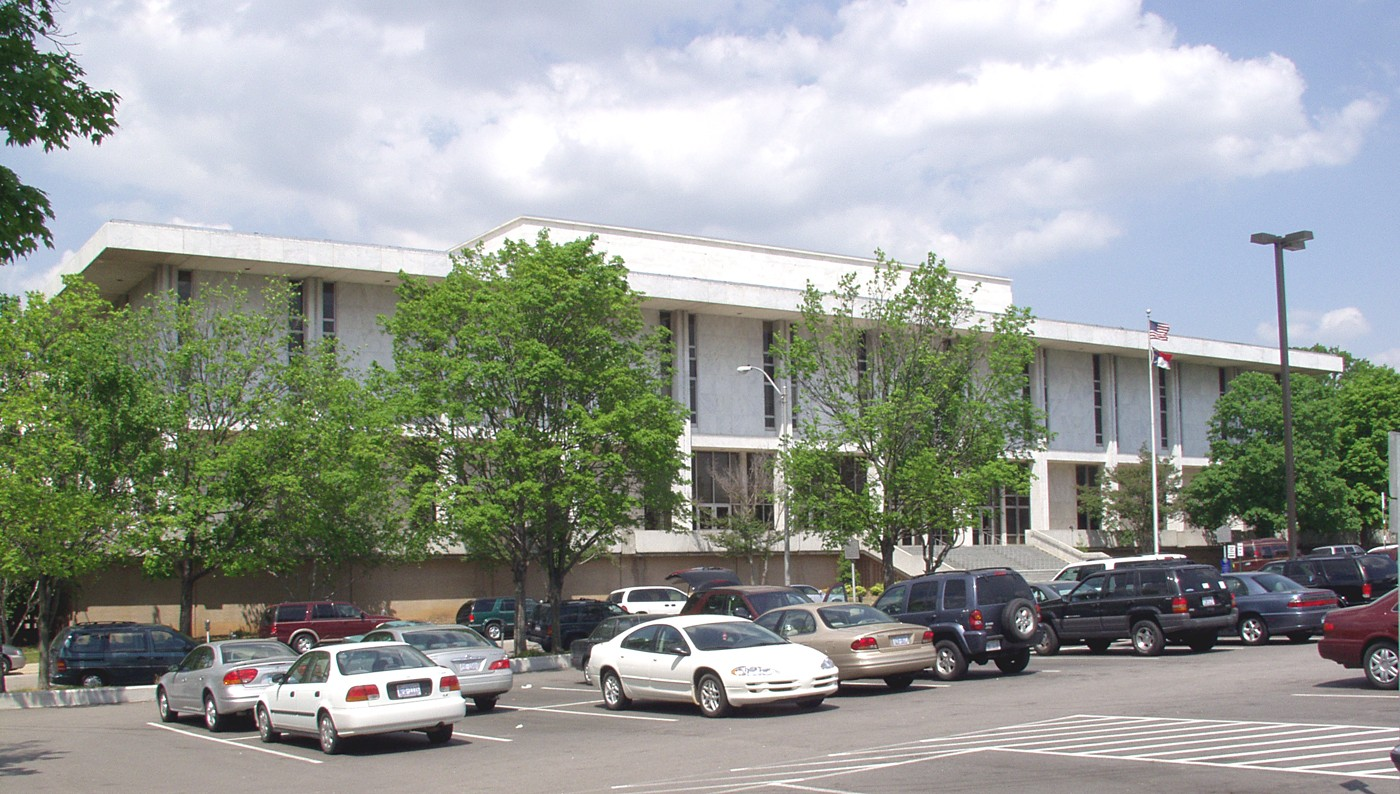
Library of NC/State Archives building

The origins of the State Library date from 1812 when the North Carolina General Assembly required the collection, cataloging, and safeguarding of books and documents for use by the state legislature and government officials. The library's primary responsibility during the nineteenth century was to serve the state legislature.

Although the State Library was patronized primarily by state officials, the public was allowed to use the reference collection on library premises beginning in 1845. Open circulation was permitted for a period during the 1870s until the mid 1880s. Until the last decade of the century, the State Library served as the state's only tax-supported library.

In response to a growing demand for more systematic support of the public library movement, the General Assembly of 1909 established the North Carolina Library Commission. Formed for the primary purpose of promoting the development of free public libraries on the local level, the commission's responsibilities included the following: assisting in the establishment of new libraries, including public school libraries; supplementing local collections; distributing library literature; and providing advice to trustees and libraries on library services.

In 1918, the State Library was run by the first woman head of a state department in North Carolina, Carrie Lougee Broughton.

In 1955, the legislature combined the State Library and the North Carolina Library Commission into one agency called the State Library. The combined programs of these two agencies served as the foundation of future developments. The State Library's responsibilities included maintaining a general collection of books, periodicals, newspapers, maps, films, audio-visual and other materials. These materials were available for use on the premises by citizens and state employees and for circulation to public libraries, state agencies, and their employees under policies established by the state librarian and approved by the Board of Trustees. Other responsibilities involved providing sets of laws and journals for the General Assembly and offering advice and assistance to libraries throughout the state and to other state agencies with special reference collections.

At the request of the North Carolina Commission for the Blind in 1958, the State Library accepted responsibility for providing library services to the blind. In subsequent years the State Library extended additional services to those unable to hold or read ordinary printed materials because of physical or visual impairments.

In the Executive Organization Act of 1973, the State Library was transferred to the Department of Cultural Resources, now the Department of Natural and Cultural Resources, which absorbed the statutory functions of the State Library.

In 1987, the legislature established a depository system for the distribution of state publications to designated libraries throughout the state. Under terms of the law, the Division of State Library was given responsibility for administering an orderly system to provide public access to the valuable current and historical publications of state government—including documents in paper, film, tape, disk, or any other format. In order to facilitate a distribution system, the legislation authorized the establishment of a State Publications Clearinghouse within the State Library.

The State Library Commission was restructured in 1991 and was given an advisory role to the secretary of Natural and Cultural Resources in the following major areas: recruitment and appointment of the state librarian and State Library operations and programs, including information services for the cultural, educational, and economic well-being of the state. The commission was also charged with working for the financial support of local public library and statewide services, including interlibrary programs.

In March 2026, the State Library of North Carolina was renamed to the Library of North Carolina.

== Services ==
The Library of North Carolina provides the following services to its patrons:

=== North Carolina Digital Collections ===
An online portal for over 90,000 historic and recent photographs, state government publications, manuscripts, and other resources on topics related to North Carolina. The Collections are free, full-text searchable, and bring together content from the State Archives of North Carolina and the Library of North Carolina. The portal contains 30+ distinct collections, including State Publications, Family Records, Urban Development in North Carolina, and NC MOSAIC.

=== Digitization ===
The Library's Government and Heritage Library heads an ongoing large-scale digitization project for state government publications in its collection, providing online access to historical state agency publications. These collections can be explored through the North Carolina State Government Publications Collection website. The Government and Heritage Library has also digitized materials from its genealogical collections and general collections. All digitized materials, including state publications and non-state publications, can be found online in the North Carolina Digital Collections.

=== Web and Social Media Archiving ===
The Library's Government and Heritage Library, together with the State Archives of North Carolina, collects and archives the websites and social media accounts of state agencies.

=== Center for the Book ===
The North Carolina Center for the Book develops and coordinates a wide range of programs hosted locally by public libraries and their community partners. It serves as an advocate, promoting the vital role of books, reading, literacy, and libraries in North Carolina. This is a state affiliate of the Center for the Book at the Library of Congress.

=== Interlibrary Loan ===
The Government and Heritage Library offers interlibrary loan services to State Employees who work in Raleigh. State Employees who work outside of Raleigh can take advantage of Interlibrary Loan Services through their local public libraries.

=== LSTA Grants ===
The Library is North Carolina's central point of dissemination for Library Services and Technology Act Grants. In 2006–2007, the Library gave away $4.4 million in grants to eligible North Carolina academic, public, special, school, and state agency libraries.

=== NC LIVE ===
The public libraries, community colleges, the state's university system, and members of the North Carolina Association of Independent Colleges and Universities are provided online access to NC LIVE, an extensive and diverse collection of premium electronic resources. The Library of NC, a member of NC LIVE, supports the training operations of the program.

=== NCpedia ===
Maintained by the Government and Heritage Library, and hosted by NC LIVE, this resource is designed to give an overview of the people, the government, the history, and the resources of North Carolina. The encyclopedia is organized into eight broad information categories: Counties and Communities, Education, Geography, Health and Society, History, People, State Government, and State Symbols.

=== North Carolina State Publications Clearinghouse ===
The North Carolina State Publications Clearinghouse is responsible for collecting, classifying, cataloging and distributing the publications of state government agencies to selected North Carolina Depository Libraries throughout the state. Currently, there are 22 Depository Libraries throughout North Carolina that receive publications through the North Carolina State Publications Clearinghouse. The Clearinghouse also collects and preserves digital state publications that are made accessible to the public through the digital State Publications Collection.

=== Public Librarian Certification ===
In North Carolina, the standards for the certification of public librarians are set by the North Carolina Public Library Certification Commission. The Commission meets quarterly to consider applications from librarians who wish to gain their North Carolina certification as public librarians.

=== References ===
Reference services are provided at both of the Library of NC's locations, on E. Jones Street and Capital Boulevard in Raleigh.

=== Youth Services ===
The Library Development Section offers resources, programs, workshops and training opportunities related to library services for youth.

== Government and Heritage Library collections ==
=== Genealogy ===
The Government and Heritage Library boasts one of the largest and most comprehensive collections of North Carolina genealogical resources in the state. The Genealogy Collection includes books (family histories, published abstracts, county, state and federal records), periodicals, census indexes, and microfilms related to North Carolina as well as states from which and to which North Carolinians migrated. Nearly all the Genealogy materials are shelved in open stacks. The Genealogy Reading Room is located on the first floor of the Library.

=== General Collection ===
A diverse general collection containing many resources concerning North Carolina's rich history, biographies, fiction, travel books, children's books related to North Carolina, and other topics of interest to North Carolinians. All items in the General Collection are shelved in closed stacks which are only accessible to Library staff. A patron can view books from the General Collection by requesting them from the Library's Information (Reference) Desk.

=== Government Documents ===
The Library is the official, complete, and permanent depository for State publications. As such, they have one of the largest and most comprehensive collections of North Carolina documents in the state. The Library is also a member of the Federal Depository Library Program. As such, they have a collection of Federal government publications as well. Except for the documents in the reference collection, all government documents are shelved in closed stacks which are only accessible to Library staff. A patron can view documents by requesting them from the Library's Information Desk.

=== North Carolina Newspapers ===
An extensive collection of North Carolina newspapers on microfilm containing over 3 million newspaper pages. The collection contains selected newspapers from just about every one of the 100 counties in North Carolina; certain titles date as far back as 1751. Current newspapers are shelved in the reference reading room. All newspapers on microfilm are shelved in closed stacks which are only accessible to Library staff. A patron can view microfilmed newspapers by requesting them from the Library's Information Desk.

=== Rare Books ===
A small and specialized selection of rare books which cover topics related to North Carolina. Qualities of the rare books include age, limited printings, signatures, and/or custom illustrations. All rare books are shelved in closed stacks which are only accessible to Library staff. A patron can view rare materials by requesting them from the Library's Information Desk.

=== References ===
The reference collection contains: North Carolina resources, current periodicals and newspapers, business information, North Carolina telephone directories, frequently requested state and federal government publications, statistical materials, directories, indices, and maps.

=== DVDs and Videos ===
A collection of videocassettes and DVDs designed to support the departments and programs of the state government. The collection is particularly strong in the areas of business, human resource development, and safety training. The videos and DVDs can be borrowed by state agencies and/or state employees for 10 days. All videos and DVDs are shelved in closed stacks which are only accessible to Library staff. A patron can request videos and DVDs at the Library's Information Desk.

== See also ==
- List of libraries in the United States
