= Ted Broughton =

English footballer

Personal information
- Full name: Edward Broughton
- Date of birth: 9 February 1925
- Place of birth: Bradford, England
- Date of death: September 2016 (aged 91)
- Place of death: Somerset, England
- Position: Winger

Senior career*
Years	Team	Apps	(Gls)
1945–1947	Bradford City	0	(0)
1947–1948	New Brighton	4	(0)
1948–1954	Crystal Palace	96	(6)
Total		100	(6)
- * Club domestic league appearances and goals

Edward Broughton (9 February 1925 – September 2016) was an English professional footballer who played as a winger.

== Career ==
Born in Bradford, Broughton began his career at hometown club Bradford City, making one appearance in the FA Cup for them. He later played for New Brighton and Crystal Palace, making a total of 100 appearances in the Football League, before retiring due to injury.
