= Long View Center =

Church building in Raleigh, North Carolina

Coordinates: 35.7784394°N 78.6351906°W

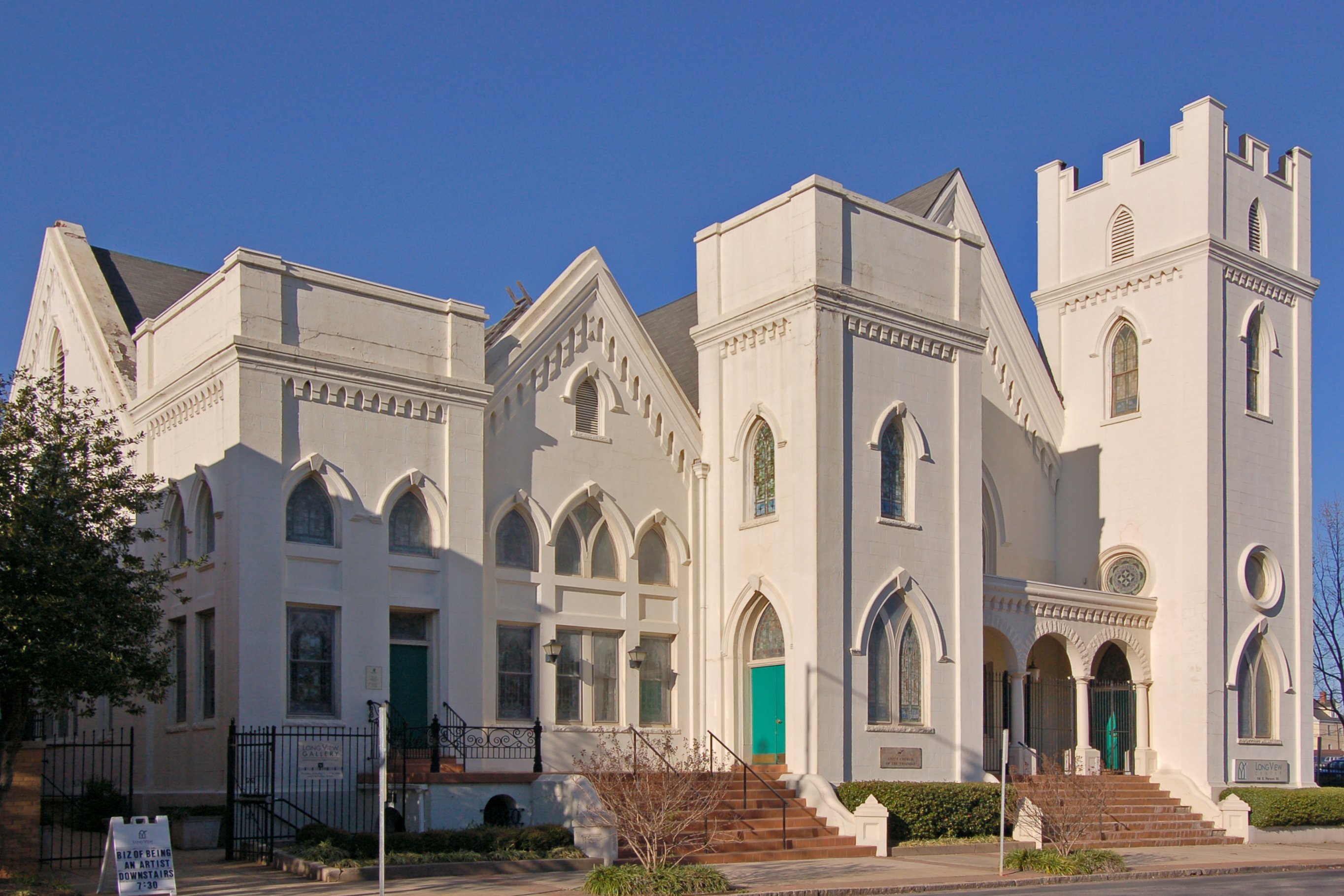
- Long View Center in 2008

Religion
- Affiliation: Vintage Church
- Status: Active

Location
- Location: Raleigh, North Carolina, United States
- Interactive map of Long View Center

Architecture
- Style: Neo-Gothic

The Long View Center is a historic church building located in the Moore Square Historic District of Raleigh, North Carolina, United States. The facility sits directly across from Moore Square, one of two surviving four-acre (1.6 ha) parks from Raleigh's original 1792 plan. Built between 1879 and 1881, Long View was originally known as Tabernacle Baptist Church. The name of the building was changed to Long View Center in 1998 after a local developer purchased the property to be used as a mixed-use facility. It was bought in December 2013 by Vintage Church. The sanctuary and offices are used by Vintage Church and Sunday services are held by Vintage Church Downtown.

== History ==
In 1874, ten members of Raleigh's First Baptist Church left the congregation and began Swain Street Baptist Church. After the church's facility became too small for the growing membership, Swain Street members constructed a new building at the corner of Person and Hargett Streets and changed their name to Second Street Baptist Church. The new location was dedicated in October 1881. The name of the church was once again changed in 1910, this time to Tabernacle Baptist Church.

During the influenza epidemic of 1918, the church opened a soup kitchen in the 1880 Hall and delivered over 2,000 meals to residents of the city. In the 1940s, the church operated a World War II serviceman's center in a building next to the sanctuary. Throughout the war, an estimated 2,000 men visited the center. During this time, the church membership rose to almost 4,000 people and Tabernacle became the largest Baptist church in North Carolina. Because of this increasing membership, two additional buildings were added.

When suburbanization became popular in the 1960s, membership began to decrease as more people moved out of the downtown area. By the late 1990s, there were only 650 members left. In 1998, the congregation decided to relocate to north Raleigh and sold the property to developer Gordon Smith for $3.07 million. While their new facility was being constructed, Tabernacle members continued to use the building until 2001. In 2006, Gordon leased the sanctuary to Unity Church after attending one of their religious services.

In December 2013, Gordon Smith sold the Long View Center to Vintage Church. Unity Church continued to use the building until June 2014, before relocating to new facilities. Vintage Church Downtown held its first service at the Long View Center on July 6, 2014, after a month of renovations.

== Architecture ==
The Long View Center is a mixture of Gothic Revival and Romanesque architecture. Originally a simple framed structure, Tabernacle was renovated throughout the early 20th century as the Moore Square district developed. The most notable renovation took place in 1910.

The facility consists of a series of four buildings totalling 50,000 sq ft (4,645 sq m). The buildings are Freedoms Hall, 1880 Hall, North Carolina Hall, and Futures Hall.

Freedoms Hall is the original sanctuary and is adjacent to Exploris Middle School. Freedoms contains 64 stained glass windows, the bell tower, parlor, and features natural acoustics. Most events at Long View take place in Freedoms Hall. The 1880 Hall, named after the year the dining hall was completed, is home to the art gallery, reception area, and smaller performances. The Futures Hall is a renovated two-story office building and the North Carolina Hall contains the Conference Room, as well as additional office space.

== Vintage Church ==
Vintage Church uses the facility to house its central staff offices as well as Vintage Church Downtown offices and ministry spaces. The building also serves as a venue for concerts and events such as the Hopscotch Music Festival, Wide Open Bluegrass Festival, and art galleries for First Night and First Friday.
