= Pillar (disambiguation) =

A pillar or column is a structural element in architecture.

Pillar or Pillars may also refer to:

- Pillar (landform), a vertical, standing, often spire-shaped, natural rock formation
- Pillar (band), a Christian rock band
- Pillar (car), a support structure of a car
- Pillar (Lake District), a mountain in England
- Pillar (video game), a 2015 puzzle game for PlayStation 4
- Pillar Data Systems, a company making enterprise storage systems
- City Pillars, a South African football (soccer) club
- "Pillars", a song by rock band Sunny Day Real Estate
- The Pillar, a fictional title in Magic Knight Rayearth
- PILLAR, the Pascal-derived programming language proposed for use in Digital's MICA operating system
- The Pillar, an American news website focusing on the Catholic Church
- Nelson's Pillar, also known as simply the Pillar, a former monument in Dublin, Ireland

== Surname ==
=== Pillar ===
- Fábio Pillar (born 1986), Brazilian sailor
- Kenneth Pillar (1924–2011), British bishop
- Kevin Pillar (born 1989), Major League Baseball player
- Michele Pillar (born 1955), American musician
- Patrícia Pillar (born 1964), Brazilian actress, producer, film director, screenwriter, and television presenter
- Paul R. Pillar, retired CIA National Intelligence Officer
- Róbert Pillár (born 1991), Slovak footballer
- William Pillar (1924–1999), Royal Navy officer

=== Pillars ===
- C. Adrian Pillars (1870–1937), American sculptor
- Eliza Pillars (1892–1970), African American nurse
- Hayes Pillars (1906–1992), American jazz tenor saxophonist and bandleader
- Isaiah Pillars (1833–1895), Ohio Attorney General
- Jeff Pillars (born 1958), American actor and screenplay writer

== See also ==
- Pillar box, a free-standing post box in the United Kingdom
- Pillarisation, the dealings of the Dutch and Belgians in their multicultural societies
- Pillar of Fire (disambiguation)
- Pillar Rock (disambiguation)
- Three pillars (disambiguation)
- Four Pillars (disambiguation)
- Five pillars (disambiguation)
- Six pillars (disambiguation)
- Seven pillars (disambiguation)
- Pillow (disambiguation)
- Pilar (disambiguation)
- Piller (disambiguation)
- Pill (disambiguation)
