= Packapalooza =

Annual block party in Raleigh, North Carolina, US

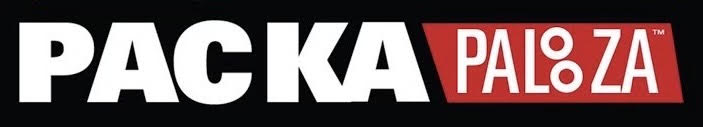

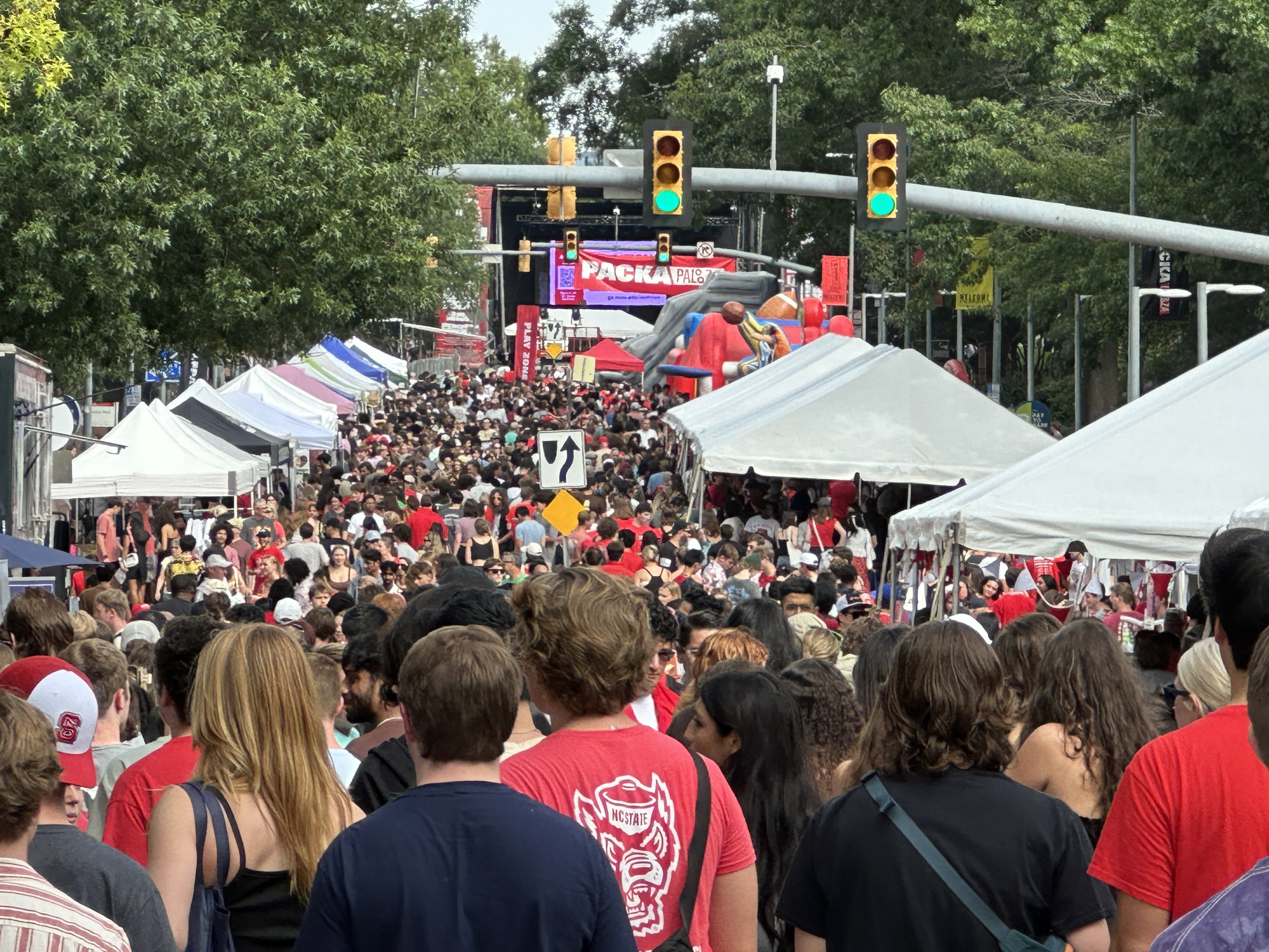
- Packapalooza 2025 at the intersection of Hillsborough Street and Logan Court
- Status: Active
- Genre: Block party
- Frequency: Annually, first Saturday of fall semester
- Locations: Hillsborough Street, Raleigh, North Carolina, US
- Coordinates: 35°47′16″N 78°40′05″W
- Years active: 14
- Inaugurated: August 18, 2012
- Previous event: August 22, 2026
- Next event: August 21, 2027
- Attendance: 90,000
- Leader: Justine Hollingshead; Jeff Murison
- Organizer: North Carolina State University; Live It Up! Hillsborough Street
- Website: packapalooza.ncsu.edu

Packapalooza is an all-day block party held annually on Hillsborough Street in Raleigh, North Carolina. Organized by North Carolina State University (NCSU) and "Live It Up! Hillsborough Street", the event is held in August on the first Saturday of fall semester: the first week of school for the incoming freshman class.

First held in 2012 to commemorate NCSU's 125th anniversary, the festival has since been held each year, with the exception of 2020 and 2021 due to the COVID-19 pandemic in North Carolina. The festival has featured local and out-of-state musical artists, with performances by country-singer Scotty McCreery, rapper Petey Pablo, and rock-singer David Cook having headlined previous years. The festival has been described as a "right of passage" for students of NCSU, and by the NCSU student newspaper Technician as an "essential pilgrimage for students and alumni".

== Set-up and activities ==
The block party, held entirely on Hillsborough Street between its intersections with Dan Allen Drive and Pullen Road, is dually organized by North Carolina State University (NCSU) and "Live It Up! Hillsborough Street" as the finale event of Wolfpack Welcome Week. The latter is a week of events held each August during the first week of fall semester, marking the first week of school for the incoming freshman class at NCSU. The main body responsible for organizing the event is the NCSU Division of Academic and Student Affairs' Packapalooza planning committee, which for the 2026 festival, was headed by NCSU assistant vice chancellor, Justine Hollingshead. Historically, the committee has consisted of over 45 members, and begins planning several months before in November. Also involved is the CEO of "Live it Up! Hillsborough Street", which for the 2026 festival, was Jeff Murison.

Described as a "day-long" event: the festival is held between 2 p.m. and 10 p.m., with set-up beginning as early as 5:30 a.m. and clean-up lasting as late as 2:30 a.m. the following day. It includes food and games hosted out of booths run by student groups and larger organizations. Give-aways and prizes are commonly offered by booths to attract attendees, with prize wheels noted as particularly prevalent. Performances by athletic, dance, music, and other groups are also common. Each year a main concert is also held: with the headliner performer in previous years playing music from various genres, including alternative rock, country, and hip-hop. Performances are often held on stages set-up for the festival, with the main stage hosting the headliner artist traditionally located at the North Carolina State University Memorial Belltower. The festival commonly concludes with a fireworks show over the Memorial Belltower.

== History ==
The festival was first held on August 18, 2012, to serve as both the concluding event of Wolfpack Welcome Week, and also in recognition of NCSU's 125th anniversary since its founding. The festival, headlined by alternative rock band Carolina Liar, saw approximately 30,000 attendees and 175 vendors. A follow-up festival was held the next year on August 24, 2013, and was headlined by alternative rock band Mutemath. The festival featured additional musical performances by country artist Scotty McCreery (with NCSU chancellor Randy Woodson briefly playing guitar with him) and hip-hop artists Kooley High and DJ Bobby Drake. An appearance was also made by then-first season coach of NC State Wolfpack football, Dave Doeren. The success of the second iteration of the festival, despite not taking place on a notable anniversary year, first emphasized the ability for the festival to become "a Raleigh staple, not just an N.C. State staple", according to an attendee interviewed.

The third iteration of the festival was held on August 23, 2014, with Scotty McCreery returning as the headliner of the concert. The festival featured additional musical performances by the collegiate a cappella groups Grains of Time and Ladies in Red, "Old Man Whickutt", and "Rashad". An appearance was also made by the "Carolina Rollergirls", the first Women's Flat Track Derby Association group from Raleigh. It rained several times during the festival, but reportedly did not affect the event in any large capacity. The fourth iteration of the festival was held on August 22, 2015, for the first time featuring a four-way headliner performance by hip-hop artists Nappy Roots, Petey Pablo, Rapsody, and Terminator X. An appearance was also made by NASCAR driver Harrison Rhodes. The fifth iteration of the festival was held on August 20, 2016, and was headlined by the rock band We the Kings. The festival featured additional musical performances by NCSU Chancellor Randy Woodson, who played the opening act on guitar, and the band "Rode Hard". The sixth iteration of the festival was held on August 19, 2017, and was headlined by the rock band Spin Doctors. The festival also featured an athletic performance by the NC State Wolfpack, and showcased a FedEx-sponsored racecar. The seventh iteration of the festival was held on August 25, 2018, and was headlined by the country music band Parmalee. Noted for its good weather, the festival became the most attended iteration since its inception with 90,000 attendees. The eighth iteration of the festival was held on August 24, 2019, and was headlined by folk rock artist Delta Rae.

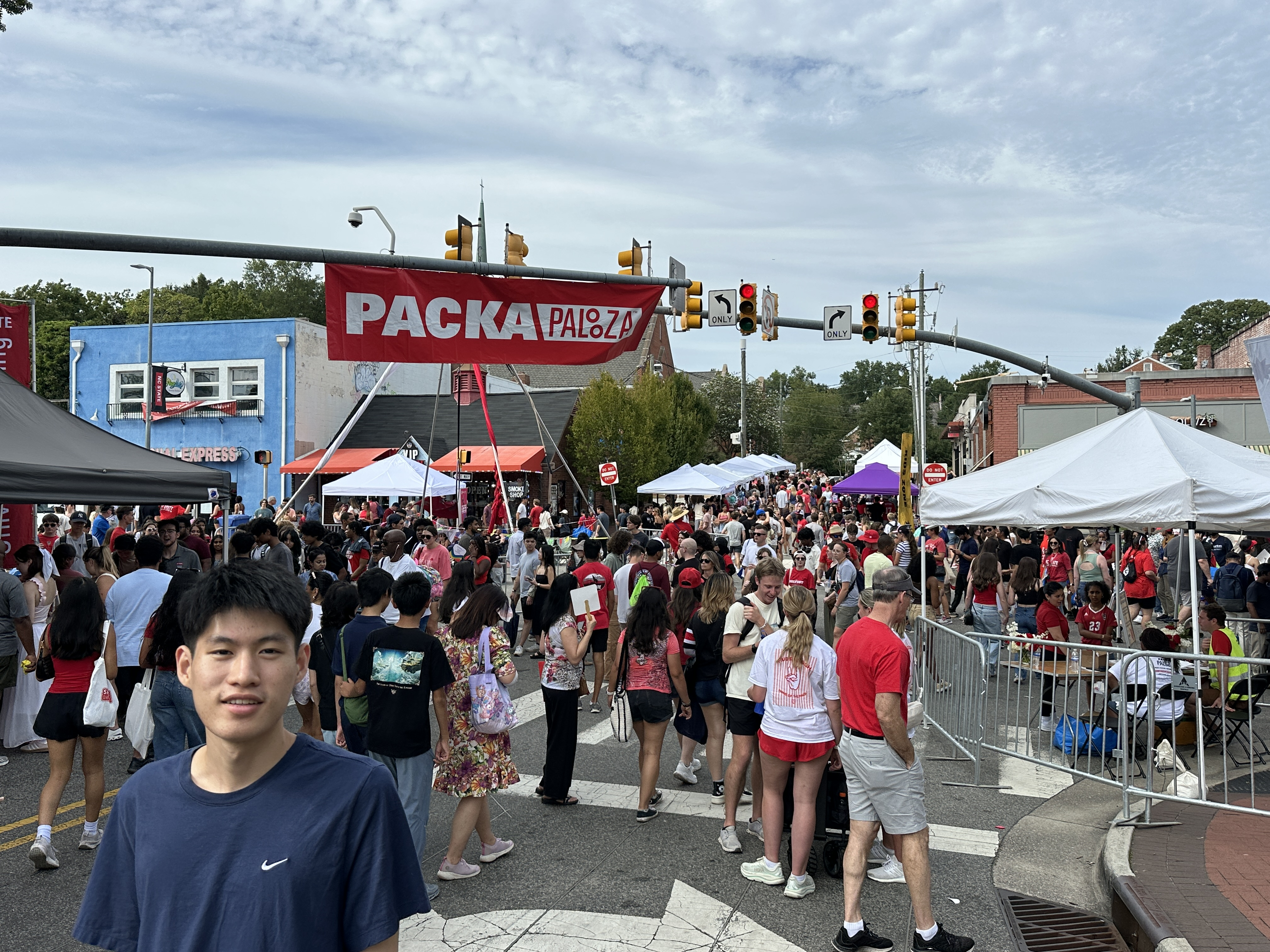
Packapalooza 2025 at the intersection of Hillsborough Street and Horne Street

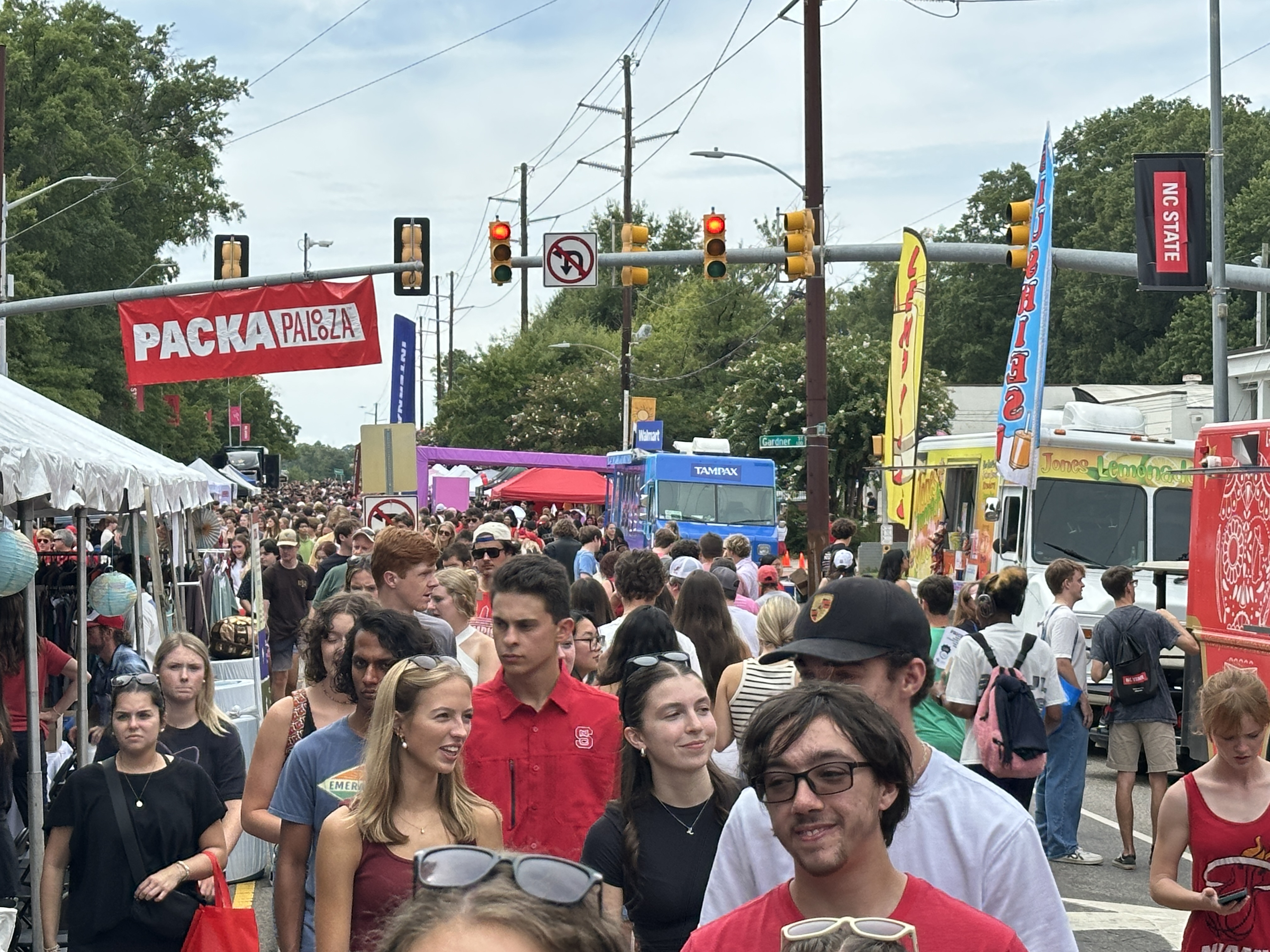
Packapalooza 2025 near the intersection of Hillsborough Street and Gardner Street

In both 2020 and 2021 the festival was cancelled because of the COVID-19 pandemic in North Carolina, only returning in 2022. The ninth iteration of the festival was held on August 27, 2022, and was headlined by alternative country artist American Aquarium. The festival also featured an athletic performance by the NC State Wolfpack football team, and an appearance by two-time Cooper's Hill Cheese-Rolling and Wake female champion, Abby Lampe. The tenth iteration of the festival was held on August 26, 2023, and was headlined by rock singer David Cook. The festival featured additional musical performances by the taiko band "Triangle Taiko". The eleventh iteration of the festival was held on August 24, 2024, and was headlined by the rock band The Rescues. WNCN reported an attendance of 80,000 with 300 vendors, while NCSU reported 90,000. The twelfth iteration of the festival was held on August 23, 2025, and was headlined by the 90s music group Saved by the 90s, and had an estimated 300 vendors. The thirteenth and most recent festival was held on August 22, 2026, and was again headlined by Saved by the 90s under the sub-band "Y2K: The Millennium Party". The festival also featured a virtual message by astronaut and NCSU alumna Christina Koch ahead of her visit to campus the following week.

== Reception ==
The Raleigh-based newspaper The News & Observer stated the festival has made its case to be "Raleigh's block party". The festival was additionally described as a "right of passage" for students of NCSU, and by the NCSU student newspaper Technician as an "essential pilgrimage for students and alumni". In a separate piece, The News & Observer cited the festival as a product of the city's ongoing "renaissance": with a street where for most of its history was primarily used for commuting, now serving as a place to go for recreation. The North Carolina State University College of Agriculture and Life Sciences stated attending the festival was one of their five "must-dos" as a student, additionally calling it the "biggest event on Hillsborough Street".

The festival has received mostly positive coverage by students of NCSU. Negative coverage, however, has come from the presence of political booths and vendors at the festival and their necessity. In a since-deleted opinion piece published by a staff columnist of Technician, the presence of booths in support of US President Donald Trump were argued to be banned, with their presence "violat[ing] the very principles that NC State upholds", citing several perceived policies during his first presidency. A response piece was published by another staff columnist two days later, arguing that freedom of speech was more important.

== Statistics by year ==
In 2026, it was reported the average attendee stayed at the festival for three hours and 45 minutes and spent an average of US$21. Below is a list of additional statistics regarding Packapalooza by year: including estimated attendance, number of vendors, and the headliner musical artist(s) and their genre of music. Statistics unknown or not reported are left blank.

Statistics of Packapalooza by year
| Year | Attendance | Vendors | Headliner artist(s) | Music genre | Ref(s). |
|---|---|---|---|---|---|
| 2012 | 30,000 | 175 | Carolina Liar | Alternative rock | |
| 2013 | 45,000 | —N/a | Mutemath | Alternative rock | |
| 2014 | 55,000 | 300 | Scotty McCreery | Country | |
| 2015 | —N/a | 350 | Nappy Roots; Petey Pablo; Rapsody; Terminator X | Southern hip-hop | |
| 2016 | 60,000 | 326 | We the Kings | Rock | |
| 2017 | —N/a | —N/a | Spin Doctors | Rock | |
| 2018 | 90,000 | 332 | Parmalee | Country | |
| 2019 | —N/a | —N/a | Delta Rae | Folk rock | |
| 2020 | Event cancelled due to COVID-19 | | | | |
| 2021 | Event cancelled due to COVID-19 | | | | |
| 2022 | 85,000 | —N/a | American Aquarium | Alternative country | |
| 2023 | —N/a | 300 | David Cook | Rock | |
| 2024 | 80,000 | 300 | The Rescues | Rock | |
| 2025 | —N/a | 300 | Saved by the 90s | 90s music | |
| 2026 | 90,000 | 357 | Saved by the 90s | 90s music | |

== See also ==
- Back to school (marketing)

Other annual events taking place on Hillsborough Street

- City of Oaks Marathon
- Krispy Kreme Challenge
