= Pilar =

Pilar, Portuguese and Spanish for pillar, may refer to:

== People ==
- Pilar (given name), a common abbreviation of María del Pilar, including a list of people so named
- Pilar (surname), a list of people surnamed Pilar or del Pilar

== Places ==
=== Argentina ===
- Barrio El Pilar, a village and municipality in Río Negro Province
- Pilar, Buenos Aires, city in Buenos Aires Province
- Pilar, Córdoba, city in Córdoba Province
- Pilar Partido, a partido located in Greater Buenos Aires in Buenos Aires Province
- Pilar, Santa Fe, town in Santa Fe Province

=== Brazil ===
- Pilar, Alagoas
- Pilar, Paraíba
- Pilar de Goiás, Goiás
- Pilar do Sul, São Paulo

=== Philippines ===
- Pilar, Abra, a 5th class municipality
- Pilar, Bataan, a 3rd class municipality
- Pilar, Bohol, a 4th class municipality
- Pilar, Capiz, a 4th class municipality
- Pilar, Cebu, a 5th class municipality
- Pilar, Sorsogon, a 1st class municipality
- Pilar, Surigao del Norte, a 5th class municipality

=== Elsewhere ===
- El Pilar, an ancient Mayan city center on the Belize-Guatemala border
- Pilar da Bretanha, a civil parish on the island of São Miguel, in the Azores
- Pilar de la Horadada, a town and district in the Province of Alicante, Spain
- Pilar, Goa, India
- Pilar, New Mexico, United States
- Pilar, Paraguay

== Other uses ==
- Pilar (boat), Ernest Hemingway's boat, also the protagonist in his novel For Whom the Bell Tolls and his nickname for second wife Pauline Pfeiffer
- Pilar College, in Zamboanga City, Philippines
- Pilar tuco-tuco, a species of rodent in the family Ctenomyidae
- Fort Pilar, a 17th-century military defence fortress in Zamboanga City, Philippines
- List of storms named Pilar, the name of multiple Eastern Pacific tropical cyclones
- Our Lady of the Pillar (Nuestra Señora del Pilar or María del Pilar), the name given to the Virgin Mary for her appearance in Spain, where she is commonly depicted as standing on top of a pillar
- Treaty of Pilar, a pact signed among the rulers of the Argentine provinces of Santa Fe, Entre Ríos and Buenos Aires
- In medicine and healthcare and anatomy and physiology, pilar means a hair, or something hair-like or having to do with hair; see pilar cyst

== See also ==
- Pilars (disambiguation), a disambiguation page
- Pillar (disambiguation)
- Pila (disambiguation)
