= Iron pillar =

Iron pillar may refer to:

- Iron pillar of Delhi, about 23 feet high
- Iron pillar of Dhar, now-fragmented, originally over 43 feet high
- Iron pillar of Kodachadri, about 40 feet high

== See also ==
- Iron
- Iron (disambiguation)
- Pillar (disambiguation)
- Piller (disambiguation)
- Weathering steel
