= 5P =

5P or 5-P may refer to:

- 5p, an arm of Chromosome 5
- Five pence (British coin)
- Five pence (Irish coin)
- GSAT-5P, an Indian communications satellite
- Team 5P, an animation production team
- Lim-5P, a model of PZL-Mielec Lim-6
- F9F-5P, a model of Grumman F9F Panther
- F6F-5P, a model of Grumman F6F Hellcat
- F4U-5P, a model of Vought F4U Corsair
- SV-5P, a model of Martin Marietta X-24
- 5P Mara, a model of Dassault Mirage 5
- Typ 5P, a model of SEAT Toledo
- 5P, NASA ID for the Progress M-45 spacecraft
- 5P, a model of HP LaserJet 5 printer
- 5P, the production code for the 1980 Doctor Who serial State of Decay

== See also ==
- P5 (disambiguation)
- Five pillars (disambiguation)
- "5 Ps", the signs and symptoms of acute compartment syndrome
