= Beach Boulevard =

Beach Boulevard may refer to:

- Beach Boulevard (Jacksonville), Florida, USA, part of US 90, SR 10, and the unsigned SR 212 and CR 212
- Beach Boulevard (California), part of SR 39
  - Beach Blvd, a punk rock compilation featuring Southern Californian bands
- Beach Boulevard, Aberdeen, Scotland, UK
- Beach Boulevard (Hamilton, Ontario), Canada
