= Pilarz =

Pilarz may refer to:

- Pilarz, Iran, a village in Ardabil Province, Iran
- Pilarz (surname)
