= KKC =

KKC may refer to:

- Kahn–Kalai conjecture, a mathematical problem in the field of probability
- Kennedy–King College, a public two-year community college in Chicago, Illinois, United States
- Khon Kaen Airport (IATA code: KKC), a Thai military/public airport
- The Kingkiller Chronicle, a fantasy trilogy by Patrick Rothfuss
- Klynveld Kraayenhof & Co., a Dutch accountancy firm
- Kohn, Kohn & Colapinto, a Washington, D.C. law firm
- Krispy Kreme Challenge, an annual charity event
- Krispy Krunchy Chicken, an American chain of fried chicken fast food restaurants
- Kulture Kiari Cephus, daughter of Cardi B and Offset (rapper)
