= City of Oaks Marathon =

Annual marathon in Raleigh, NC

- Current logo (2026)
- Date: First Sunday of November
- Location: Raleigh, North Carolina
- Event type: Road; Greenway
- Distance: Marathon
- Established: 2007 (19 years ago)
- Course records: Men: 2:18:33.7 (2019) John Crews; Women: 2:39:36.0 (2014) Michelle Renee Langan
- Website: cityofoaksmarathon.com

The City of Oaks Marathon is an annual marathon race hosted in Raleigh, North Carolina, the capital of the U.S. state of North Carolina. Beginning in 2007, the race is traditionally held the first Sunday of November, and is organized by a nonprofit with the goal to raise money for charity. In addition to the marathon, the race also hosts a half marathon, "Old reliable" 10k event, and "Acorn" 5k event which follow a course consisting of greenway and road running.

The race has become popular within the state, with an attendance of over seven thousand between the four events for the past two years. The race has received positive reception for its course which follows urban landmarks including the North Carolina State Capitol and North Carolina State University Memorial Belltower and natural landmarks including multiple parks and the Capital Area Greenway, and mixed reception for its natural obstacles including a number of hills, and the time of year it takes place often producing cold running conditions. The half marathon event was ranked as one of the fifteen best in North America in 2024 by running magazine Runner's World.

== History ==
While marathons had taken place in city before, the modern version of the race was founded in 2007 by Raleigh-resident Kaz Yahyapour and a group of co-founders. Yahyapour stated his reason for creating the race was after he suffered a near-fatal heart attack five years prior at age 47, which had motivated him to focus more on his health, and combat his family history of cardiovascular disease. The inaugural race consisted of only the marathon and half marathon events, and was named the "Sony Ericsson City of Oaks Marathon" for sponsorship reasons. The race had a large turnout of 2,730 for the half marathon and 1,098 for the marathon, and was well received by the Raleigh Convention and Visitors Bureau officials, who supported the race to become a tradition. Over the next decade the race remained an annual occurrence while operating as a nonprofit 501(c)(3) organization, supporting charitable organizations including the Rex Healthcare Foundation and YMCA. By the 2014 race, the event had gained Rex Healthcare and The News & Observer as large sponsors, and grown to include the "Old Reliable" 10k event, "Acorn" 5k event, and kid's "Marathon mile" event.

In 2016, the local news station WRAL-TV investigated potential fraud by the nonprofit which organized the race under the leadership of Jim Micheels, with large sums of money not itemized on tax returns in 2013 and 2014, coinciding with the race's accelerated drop in donations to charity from $83,500 in 2012, to $41,000 in 2013, to $0 in 2014, despite each year having similar revenue. The same tax returns also revealed that Micheels had loaned his running outfitters business $12,000 from the nonprofit in 2014, and paid his wife $35,926 from the nonprofit in the same year for handling marketing. Micheels, who had stepped down as the board president of the nonprofit after the 2014 race, claimed no wrongdoing: stating the loan to his business had since been paid back, the payment to his wife for marketing was justified, and the remainder of the money went towards expenses including hiring a full-time race director. The local racing company, Race 13.1, took over management of the nonprofit after Micheels, and stated a minimum of $40,000 would go towards charity moving forward.

Modern day, the race has run largely without further incident. In 2019, the winner of the marathon, John Crews, set the course record at two hours and 18 minutes, a time which qualified him for the 2020 United States Olympic Trials (marathon). In the same race, Dahlia Rohm broke the course record for females with a time of two hours and 50 minutes. The race has also retained its sponsors, with the 2017 race sponsored by mobile provider AT&T, the 2021 race by Raleigh-based software company Pendo, and the 2022 race again by Rex Healthcare. In 2021, coming off of the COVID-19 pandemic in North Carolina, the race saw a few hundred participants. In 2022 attendance rebounded, and for the first time an attendance of close to 6,000 was recorded, something which was credited to improved management and atmosphere throughout the course by race organizers, and prompted future races to request more course monitors and police officers. In 2023, the race broke an attendance record of more than 7,600 participants competing across the multiple race events. This attendance record was broken again the following year in 2024.

== Race ==
The race has traditionally taken place the first Sunday of November. The marathon course follows an out-and-back style through Raleigh, beginning in Downtown Raleigh before connecting to Hillsborough Street, which after a loop in the Pullen Park-area, reconnects to Hillsborough Street. The street soon connects to the Capital Area Greenway, which after running portions of the Ready Creek Trail, House Creek Trail, and Mine Creek Trail, in that order, ends at Shelley Lake Park where the halfway turnaround point is located. After the turnaround point, much of the course is repeated, with the exception of the ending which is in the Glenwood South district of downtown. In addition to the multiple parks, other landmark locations along the course include the North Carolina State Capitol, North Carolina State University Memorial Belltower, and businesses like Irregardless Cafe and Trophy Brewing and Pizza are along the route. All roads involved in the race are temporarily closed to keep the route a closed course. In regards to elevation the course is particularly hilly, containing an increase of 1,123 feet and a decrease of 1,151 feet, totaling a slight net downhill of 28 feet.

In addition to the marathon, there is also a half marathon event, 10k event, and 5k event: each following a nearly identical, shortened version of the marathon route. The cut off time limits for each race is six hours for the marathon (14-minute mile pace), three and a half hours for the half marathon (16-minute mile pace), and two hours for both the 10k and 5k events (19-minute and 38-minute mile pace respectively). Participants who do not finish within the time limit will not receive an official time, and will have to follow ordinary pedestrian laws for the remainder of their run. During the races, there are pacers present for both the marathon and half marathon events, with the fastest marathon pacer running a time of three hours and 15 minutes, and the fastest half marathon pacer running a time of one hour and 45 minutes. Water stations and portable toilets are also present along the course. At the end of the races, all participants receive a finisher medal, with the top three male and female finishers overall and for their age group additionally receiving a placement medal. In addition to the placement medal, winners of each race receive a cash prize which varies by year, but in 2014 totaled $10,500 between the marathon and half marathon winners.

=== Reception ===
The race has been described as the "premier" race of the city by WRAL, and one of the fifteen best fall half marathons in North America in 2024 by running magazine Runner's World. The urban and natural landmarks along the route have been described as positives by finishers of the race, while hilliness and cold have been described as natural obstacles. 2018 marathon winner Carter Binge commenting on the elevation of the course: stating it hosted lots of uphill and downhill portions, with few flat areas. This stance has been shared by other finishers of the race. Being early November, the race has taken place in temperatures as cold as mid-30 degree Fahrenheit. Conversely, the cooler weather has also been described as a benefit of the race.

== Winners ==
Below lists the winners and female winners of the City of Oaks Marathon, Half Marathon, 10k, and 5k events. Due to the race's current website only recording results as far back as 2022, the results of some prior events are lost in an official capacity due to link rot, and a third-party source is used in these situations if available.

—N/a	Data Not Available

=== Marathon ===
Winners of the City of Oaks Marathon
Year	Winner	Country and City	Time	Female winner	Country and City	Time	Placed	Ref(s).
2007	Tim Surface	United States (North Carolina) Raleigh, NC	2:35:22.0	Gloria Kuiken-Iverson	United States (Illinois) Lincolnwood, IL	2:59:54.0	11th	
2008	John Crews	United States (North Carolina) Raleigh, NC	2:21:27.0	Heather Davis	United States (North Carolina) Raleigh, NC	3:02:55.0	21st	
2009	Patrick Reaves	United States (North Carolina) Durham, NC	2:33:02.0	Elena Kaledina	United States (Oregon) Eugene, OR	2:49:51.0	6th	
2010	Geoffrey Kiprotich	United States (North Carolina) Durham, NC	2:26:04.0	Elena Kaledina	United States (Oregon) Eugene, OR	2:51:30.0	16th	
2011	Mitch VanBruggen	United States (North Carolina) Durham, NC	2:29:33.0	Kimberlie Fowler	United States (North Carolina) Raleigh, NC	2:55:26.0	10th	(Note: All official results for this year, including those sourced on the Wayback Machine, have become permanent dead links. A third-party source is instead used.)
2012	Tim Surface	—N/a	2:33:55.0	Lauren Holesh	—N/a	2:51:08.0	9th	
2013	Bryan Morseman	United States (New York (state)) Addison, NY	2:27:29.0	Kimberlie Meeker	United States (North Carolina) Raleigh, NC	2:50:05.0	15th	
2014	Arturs Bareikis	—N/a	2:29:30.0	Michelle Renee Langan	—N/a	2:39:36.0	5th	
2015	Caleb Masland	United States (North Carolina) Boone, NC	2:34:31.0	Shawanna White	United States (South Carolina) Columbia, SC	3:01:27.0	9th	
2016	Evan Vadenais	United States (Massachusetts) Millville, MA	2:36:56.6	Caroline Veltri	United States (New Jersey) Kinnelon, NJ	3:01:36.3	—N/a	
2017	Michael Dixon	United States (New Jersey) Highland Park, NJ	2:37:02.0	Esther Spradling	United States (North Carolina) Cameron, NC	2:55:29.1	11th	
2018	Carter Benge	United States (North Carolina) Fayetteville, NC	2:38:50.5	Emma Astrike-Davis	United States (North Carolina) Durham, NC	2:55:29.1	4th	
2019	John Crews	United States (North Carolina) Cary, NC	2:18:33.8	Dahlia Rohm	United States (North Carolina) Durham, NC	2:50:37.5	6th	
2020	Event cancelled/held virtually due to COVID-19							
2021	Esayas Nida	United States (North Carolina) Greensboro, NC	2:38:01.6	Antonia Bista	United States (North Carolina) Durham, NC	2:52:18.5	7th	
2022	Esayas Nida	United States (North Carolina) Greensboro, NC	2:39:28.0	Ashley Peppriell	United States (North Carolina) Durham, NC	3:16:34.8	14th	
2023	Michael Harris	United States (Massachusetts) South Hamilton, MA	2:43:44.8	Jessica Barkley	United States (North Carolina) West End, NC	3:01:25.0	14th	
2024	Hunter Gilbert	United States (North Carolina) Leasburg, NC	2:36:40.2	Emma Astrike-Davis	United States (North Carolina) Durham, NC	3:04:47.8	23rd	
2025	Keith Reinert	United States (Colorado) Lakewood, CO	2:38:54.6	Emma Astrike-Davis	United States (North Carolina) Durham, NC	3:00:44.6	29th	
2026	Christian Christopoulos	—N/a	2:40:25.0	Brigid Brennan	—N/a	2:55:18.0	13th	

=== Half marathon event ===
Winners of the City of Oaks Half Marathon
Year	Winner	Country and City	Time	Female winner	Country and City	Time	Placed	Ref(s).
2007	Jynocel Basweti	United States (North Carolina) Chapel Hill, NC	1:05:18.0	Irene Mogaka	United States (North Carolina) Chapel Hill, NC	1:17:41.0	10th	
2008	Joseph Ngetich	United States (Georgia (U.S. state)) Kennesaw, GA	1:05:42.8	Janet Cherobon	United States (Georgia (U.S. state)) Lawrenceville, GA	1:14:30.8	14th	
2009	Kipyegon Kirui	United States (North Carolina) Chapel Hill, NC	1:05:08.0	Ilona Barvanova	United States (Oregon) Eugene, OR	1:18:15.0	18th	
2010	Daniel Kipkoech	United States (Georgia (U.S. state)) Kennesaw, GA	1:04:35.0	Maria Busienei	United States (West Virginia) Charleston, WV	1:20:17.0	15th	
2011	—N/a							(Note: All official results for this year, including those sourced on the Wayback Machine, have become permanent dead links. A third-party source additionally could not be found, and the results are considered to be lost.)
2012	Bobby Mack	—N/a	1:04:19.0	Caitlin Chrisman	—N/a	1:22:59.0	19th	
2013	Daniel Kerr	United States (North Carolina) Winston-Salem, NC	1:09:20.0	Amanda Hamilton	United States (North Carolina) Cary, NC	1:22:14.0	19th	
2014	Jordan Zwick	United States (North Carolina) Raleigh, NC	1:12:07.0	Lindsey Scherf	United States (North Carolina) Chapel Hill, NC	1:18:05.0	5th	
2015	Jesse McEntire	United States (North Carolina) Charlotte, NC	1:10:02.0	Michelle Langan	United States (North Carolina) Cary, NC	1:18:16.0	12th	
2016	David Lyons	United States (Washington (state)) Seattle, WA	1:14:13.9	Gabriela Rocha	Brazil (Mato Grosso do Sul) Dourados, MS	1:19:02.4	4th	
2017	Devin Rourke	United States (Colorado) Boulder, CO	1:16:14.7	Rachel Norton	United States (Colorado) Boulder, CO	1:24:52.7	9th	
2018	Wade Miller	United States (North Carolina) Raleigh, NC	1:13:29.4	Caroline Veltri	United States (Colorado) Boulder, CO	1:20:07.7	3rd	
2019	Samuel Montclair	United States (North Carolina) Cary, NC	1:08:54.7	Becky Younger	United States (North Carolina) Holly Springs, NC	1:27:16.0	22nd	
2020	Event cancelled/held virtually due to COVID-19							
2021	Samuel Montclair	United States (North Carolina) Cary, NC	1:09:18.8	Rebecca McGavin	United States (North Carolina) Durham, NC	1:23:50.0	10th	
2022	Samuel Montclair	United States (North Carolina) Cary, NC	1:11:09.8	Kate Sanborn	United States (North Carolina) Raleigh, NC	1:16:23.4	4th	
2023	Colin O'Mara	United States (North Carolina) Durham, NC	1:08:55.4	Lindsey Siska	United States (North Carolina) Durham, NC	1:20:10.5	10th	
2024	Robert Mazzanti	United States (Virginia) Richmond, VA	1:09:48.6	Jessica Barkley	United States (North Carolina) West End, NC	1:24:45.0	18th	
2025	Tom Bean	United States (North Carolina) Raleigh, NC	1:10:05.2	Sheccid Ontiveros	United States (North Carolina) High Point, NC	1:20:16.2	14th	
2026	Isai Rodriguez	—N/a	1:03:22.0	Emma Astrike	—N/a	1:27:41.0	48th	

=== 10k event ===
Winners of the City of Oaks "Old Reliable" 10k Event
Year	Winner	Country and City	Time	Female winner	Country and City	Time	Placed	Ref(s).
2007	Event was not held until 2011							
2008	Event was not held until 2011							
2009	Event was not held until 2011							
2010	Event was not held until 2011							
2011	—N/a							
2012	Brock Baker	—N/a	32:00.0	Brianne Gaal	—N/a	40:52.0	20th	
2013	Rodrigo De La Parra	United States (North Carolina) Cary, NC	31:25.0	Michelle Renee Langan	United States (North Carolina) Cary, NC	35:27.0	6th	
2014	Daniel Hinshaw	—N/a	34:47.0	Jennifer Zwick	—N/a	37:13.0	2nd	
2015	Bobby Mack	United States (North Carolina) Raleigh, NC	30:26.0	Nicci Tice	United States (North Carolina) Raleigh, NC	42:29.0	16th	
2016	Fred Bariso	United States (North Carolina) Knightdale, NC	31:34.2	Candace Werder	United States (North Carolina) Chapel Hill, NC	40:40.0	—N/a	
2017	Matthew Liaw	United States (New Mexico) Crownpoint, NM	33:30.5	Natalie Taylor	United States (North Carolina) Raleigh, NC	44:02.5	21st	
2018	Fred Segera	United States (North Carolina) Knightdale, NC	32:01.8	Michelle Brewington	United States (North Carolina) Raleigh, NC	39:42.4	4th	
2019	Ryan Medas	United States (North Carolina) Charlotte, NC	37:40.8	Meghan O'Hara	United States (North Carolina) Raleigh, NC	41:20.3	11th	
2020	Event cancelled/held virtually due to COVID-19							
2021	Luke Gilman	United States (North Carolina) New Bern, NC	36:13.8	Stephanie Knast-Magos	United States (North Carolina) Raleigh, NC	38:12.3	3rd	
2022	Patrick Shaw	United States (North Carolina) Cary, NC	36:07.4	Katie Sanderson	United States (North Carolina) Raleigh, NC	39:27.5	10th	
2023	Kyle Windland	United States (North Carolina) Willow Spring, NC	35:05.8	Anginelle Alabanza	United States (North Carolina) Cary, NC	40:20.3	14th	
2024	Gabe Sawyer	United States (North Carolina) Youngsville, NC	35:53.1	Madeline Kunz	United States (North Carolina) Raleigh, NC	38:36.2	6th	
2025	Mason Shanahan	United States (North Carolina) New Hill, NC	35:23.0	Stephanie Corder	United States (North Carolina) Durham, NC	40:52.2	18th	
2026	Ty Garrett	—N/a	32.03.0	Sheccid Ontiveros	—N/a	39:47.0	15th	

=== 5k event ===
Winners of the City of Oaks "Acorn" 5k Event
Year	Winner	Country and City	Time	Female winner	Country and City	Time	Placed	Ref(s).
2007	Event was not held until 2016							
2008	Event was not held until 2016							
2009	Event was not held until 2016							
2010	Event was not held until 2016							
2011	Event was not held until 2016							
2012	Event was not held until 2016							
2013	Event was not held until 2016							
2014	Event was not held until 2016							
2015	Event was not held until 2016							
2016	Andrew Palumbo	United States (North Carolina) Raleigh, NC	17:52.4	Kimberly Cary	United States (North Carolina) Raleigh, NC	19:51.8	4th	
2017	Austin Semmel	United States (North Carolina) Bunnlevel, NC	17:18.8	Madeline Shook	United States (North Carolina) Raleigh, NC	18:35.8	2nd	
2018	George Ellis	United States (North Carolina) Garner, NC	19:05.5	Caroline Armstrong	United States (North Carolina) Durham, NC	22:06.9	4th	
2019	Simon Griggs	United States (North Carolina) Apex, NC	17:28.8	Alicia Rider	United States (North Carolina) Winston-Salem, NC	19:41.7	7th	
2020	Event cancelled/held virtually due to COVID-19							
2021	Chris Knotek	United States (North Carolina) Chapel Hill, NC	17:21.8	Meghan Comiskey	United States (North Carolina) Raleigh, NC	19:26.8	8th	
2022	Ryan Catrine	United States (North Carolina) Cary, NC	18:06.7	Katherine Jonas	United States (Georgia (U.S. state)) Atlanta, GA	18:48.5	6th	
2023	Frank Holiman	United States (North Carolina) Raleigh, NC	17:26.8	Katherine Jonas	United States (Georgia (U.S. state)) Atlanta, GA	18:34.4	8th	
2024	Dylan Buffington	United States (North Carolina) Raleigh, NC	16:23.5	Katherine Jonas	United States (Georgia (U.S. state)) Atlanta, GA	18:12.7	7th	
2025	Sean Billy	United States (North Carolina) Chapel Hill, NC	16:27.4	Kristen Roumanis	United States (North Carolina) Cary, NC	17:55.0	8th	
2026	Dylan Buffington	—N/a	15:56.0	Kayla Johnson	—N/a	18:48.0	10th	
