= Four Pillars =

Four Pillars or four pillars may refer to:

== Politics and government ==
- Four pillars policy, to keep Australia's four largest banks separate
- Four Pillars of Nepal Bhasa, four people who campaign to revive the language and literature
- Four pillars, Vietnamese term for the four most important people in the government
- The four pillars of green politics
- The four pillars of communication rights

== Science, technology and mathematics ==
- Four Pillars (Geneva Association), an economic policy research programme
- Four pillars of manufacturing engineering, devised by the American SME
- Four Pillars of Geometry, a 2005 book by John Stillwell

== Religion and astrology ==
- Four Pillars of Destiny, a Chinese component used in fortune telling
- Four Pillars of Dominican Life, principles of the Dominican Order

== Other uses ==
- Four Pillars, an LGBTQ support charity based in Aberdeen which organises Grampian Pride

== See also ==
- Three pillars (disambiguation)
- Five pillars (disambiguation)
