= Grampian Pride =

Annual LGBT pride festival in Aberdeen, Scotland

- Logo used since 2020

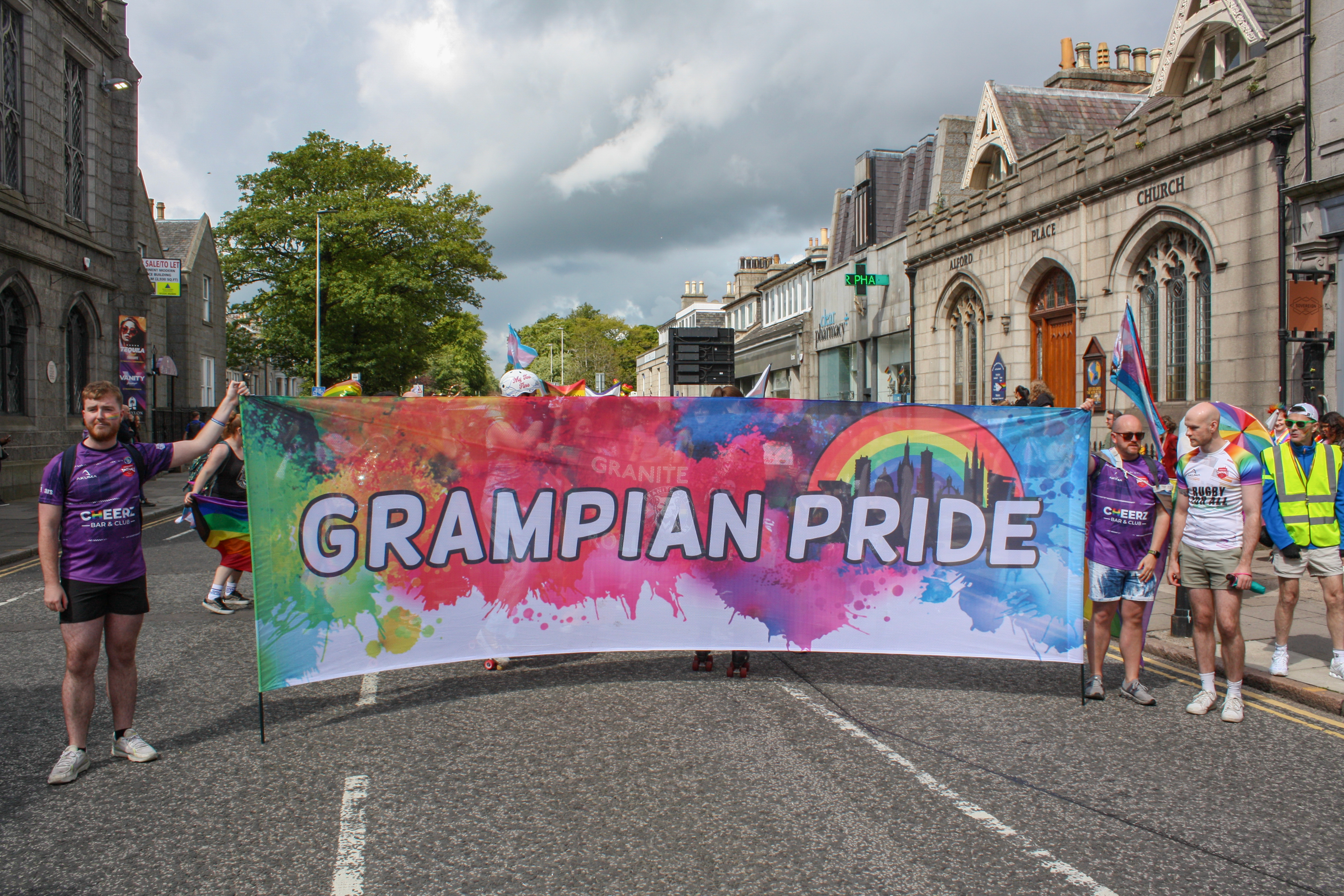
- Front banner of Grampian Pride 2025
- Genre: Pride parade
- Frequency: Annually
- Locations: Aberdeen, Scotland
- Years active: 2018–present
- Inaugurated: 26 May 2018; 8 years ago
- Most recent: 7 June 2025; 16 months ago
- Organiser: Four Pillars

Grampian Pride is an annual LGBTQ pride parade held in Aberdeen, Scotland since 2018. It is organised by the LGBTQ support charity Four Pillars.

== History ==
=== Background ===
Prior to Grampian Pride, Aberdeen had annual celebrations of pride in Duthie Park in the 2000s. The first was called We're Not All Set in Granite and was held by the North East Equality Forum on 16 June 2002. The second, organised by Phace Scotland, took place between 24 May and 1 June 2003 and featured a performance of the play Beautiful Thing at Aberdeen Arts Centre on its first day along with an event at Duthie Park on its last day which included a concert featuring local artists. Another pride event was held at Duthie Park on 6 June 2004, this time by the North-East Lesbian Gay Bisexual and Transgender Forum.

Rainbowfest took place on 5 July 2008 at Queens Links. It featured performances by Pete Burns, Lisa Maffia and Booty Luv.

In 2016, the LGBTQ support charity which runs Grampian Pride, Four Pillars, was founded in Aberdeen.

=== 2018-2020: Initial events ===
The first Grampian Pride event took place on 26 May 2018. It consisted of a parade along Aberdeen's primary thoroughfare, Union Street, followed by a pride village on the Beach Boulevard at Queens Links which included a performance by Sandi Thom and a talk by Annie Wallace, who portrays Sally St. Claire on Hollyoaks. Kevin Stewart – the MSP for Aberdeen Central – spoke about his youth in the closet. Lewis Macdonald and Douglas Lumsden – an MSP for the North East Scotland electoral region and a co-leader of Aberdeen City Council respectively – were also in attendance.

The second Grampian Pride was held on 25 May 2019 and featured Rozalla and Booty Luv along with after-parties at nightlife establishments. More than 6,000 people were present.

=== 2020–2022: Virtually Grampian Pride and Winter Parade ===
The 2020 parade was indefinitely delayed and ultimately run as a virtual event due to the COVID-19 pandemic and associated lockdown measures. The event, labelled Virtually Grampian Pride, took place on 30 May 2020 on Shutdown FM and was followed by an open meeting hosted on Zoom by Four Pillars the next day. A second virtual pride took place on 29 May 2021 over Facebook and Twitch before it returned as an in-person parade branded as Winter Pride on 24 October. Winter Pride had 2,000 participants and did not include the pride village which accompanied previous parades. The restoration of the parade was acknowledged in a motion in the Scottish Parliament by Karen Adam, the MSP for Banffshire and Buchan Coast.

=== 2022–2025: Full return to in-person events ===
Grampian Pride was held in person again on 28 May 2022, with the parade promoted as a full-scale revival following the restrictions on mass gatherings prompted by the pandemic. It marked the return of the pride village, with the event manager Deejay Whittingham describing the celebration as "aiming to recreate 2019, with better weather, [and] the parade, village times and activities being almost identical", with the intention of providing a "familiar setting" following the isolation of lockdown.

2023 saw Four Pillars expand to run LGBTQ events in various locations in Aberdeenshire, including Stonehaven, Peterhead, Fraserburgh and Huntly. The charity also released a smartphone app for Android and iOS which functioned as a mobile ticketing system.

That year's Grampian Pride parade in Aberdeen took place on 27 May, with the pride village moved from Queens Links to Duthie Park. The village included a talk by Matt Middler, who had been involved in organising the 2000s pride celebrations, along with an outdoor concert headlined by Basshunter followed by an after-party presented by the radio personality Greigsy and featuring a range of acts including The Cheeky Girls, Gareth Gates, Alex Party and Janice Robinson. During her performance, Robinson paid tribute to Tina Turner, who had died earlier that week, calling her "the kind of person that everyone needs in their life – giving, warm, dedicated and loving". Prior to the event, she described opening for Turner on the Twenty Four Seven Tour as "the opportunity of a lifetime". Over 8,500 people attended Grampian Pride 2023.

The 2024 parade took place on 25 May and was partly rerouted due to roadworks on a section of Union Street. The stage performances at the pride village included the pop music trio Subwoolfer and the drag queen Cheryl.

The following Grampian Pride took place on 7 June 2025 and included carnival rides from Codona's at the village. The modified route from 2024 was retained due to continued construction work on Union Street. Over 5,000 people were in attendance.

=== 2025–present: Cancellation of 2026 parade ===
In November 2025, Four Pillars announced that the following year's parade would not take place due to financial constraints, along with the need to prioritise support for LGBTQ people in the city in light of a heightened frequency of hate incidents. The charity expressed its intention to restart the parade in future years, along with plans to cooperate with other organisations on individual events over the course of a month in 2026.

== Sponsorship ==
Grampian Pride's sponsorship by companies including BP and Shell has been criticised on environmental grounds, with the campaign group Fossil Free Pride calling BP's backing "cynical" and a "pinkwashing opportunity" in the context of the company's links with Israel during the Gaza war.
