= P5 =

P5 may refer to:

== In science and technology ==
- 311P/PANSTARRS, also known as P/2013 P5 (PANSTARRS), an asteroid discovered by the Pan-STARRS telescope on 27 August 2013
- P5 Truss Segment, an element of the International Space Station
- Period 5 of the periodic table of elements
- Styx (moon), the fifth moon of the dwarf planet Pluto
- Particle Physics Project Prioritization Panel, a scientific funding advisory group in the United States
- Pregnenolone, a steroid hormone

=== Vehicles ===
- P-5 Hawk, a 1923 aircraft
- Martin P5M Marlin, a flying boat
- Rover P5 (commonly called 3-Litre and 3½ Litre), a group of automobiles produced from 1958–1973
- Palatine P 5, a 1908 locomotive
- PRR P5, mixed-traffic electric locomotives constructed 1931–1935
- Protegé5, a 5-door sport-wagon produced by Mazda from 2002–2003
- Polikarpov P-5, Soviet passenger aircraft, modification of the R-5

=== In computing ===
- P5 Glove, an input device for human-computer interaction
- P5 (microarchitecture), a fifth-generation central processing unit introduced in 1993
- System p5, a family of servers and workstations created by IBM in 2005
- p5.js is the JavaScript port of Processing
- Perl, version 5

=== Weapons ===
- P-5 Pyatyorka, a 1959 anti-shipping missile of the Soviet Union
- Walther P5, a pistol made by German arms maker Walther in the 1970s

== In arts and entertainment ==
- P5 (comics), a comic strip also known as Class Act, in the UK comic The Dandy
- Persona 5, a 2016 video game from Atlus

=== In music ===
- Perfect fifth, a music interval
- Pizzicato Five, a Shibuya-kei group
- Periphery V: Djent Is Not a Genre, a 2023 album by progressive metal band Periphery

== Other uses ==
- Copa Airlines Colombia (formerly AeroRepublica), IATA airline code P5
- The five permanent members of the United Nations Security Council
  - P5+1, the five permanent members of the UN Security Council plus Germany
- Norrbotten Armoured Battalion, designated P 5, a Swedish Army armored battalion active since 1957
- Power Five conferences, in American college football

== See also ==
- 5P (disambiguation)
