= Emily Afton =

American singer and actress (born 1985)

- Born: January 26, 1985 (age 40); United States
- Education: Emerson College (BFA)
- Occupation(s): Singer and actress
- Website: www.emilyafton.com

Emily Afton (born January 26, 1985) is an American singer and actress known for her roles in the Original Broadway Cast of Amélie, Broadway and National Tour casts of Hair, and National Tour of Priscilla, Queen of the Desert. In 2015, she played Pattie in the STAGES St. Louis production of Smokey Joe's Cafe. In 2017, she performed with the Broadway’s Future Songbook Series featuring the work of Michael Finke.

She performs as lead female vocalist for the bands Saved by the 90s and The Little Mermen.

== Theatre credits ==
Year	Production	Role	Location	Category
2017	Amélie	U/s Amelie Poulain, swing, dance captain	Walter Kerr Theatre	Broadway
2017	Amélie	U/s Amelie Poulain, swing, dance captain	Ahmanson Theatre	Regional Pre-Broadway
2016	Oliver!	Nancy	Arrow Rock Lyceum Theatre	Regional
2015	Smokey Joe's Cafe	Pattie	STAGES St. Louis	Regional
2015	Waitress	Swing, dance captain	A.R.T.	Regional Pre-Broadway
2014	Standard Time	Featured vocalist (temporary replacement)	The Duke	Off-Broadway
2013	Standard Time	Featured vocalist	F.M. Kirby Center	Regional Pre-NYC
2012-2013	Priscilla, Queen of the Desert	Diva 1	National Tour	1st National Tour
2011	Hair	Swing, dance captain	St. James Theatre	Broadway
2010-2012	Hair	U/s Jeanie, swing, asst. dance captain	National Tour	1st National Tour
2009	A Funny Thing Happened on the Way to the Forum	Philia	Goodspeed Opera House	Regional
2007-2008	I Love a Piano	Swing	National Tour	1st National Tour
