= Hillyer Memorial Christian Church (Raleigh, North Carolina) =

Church in North Carolina, U.S.

Coordinates: 35.7810°N 78.6500°W

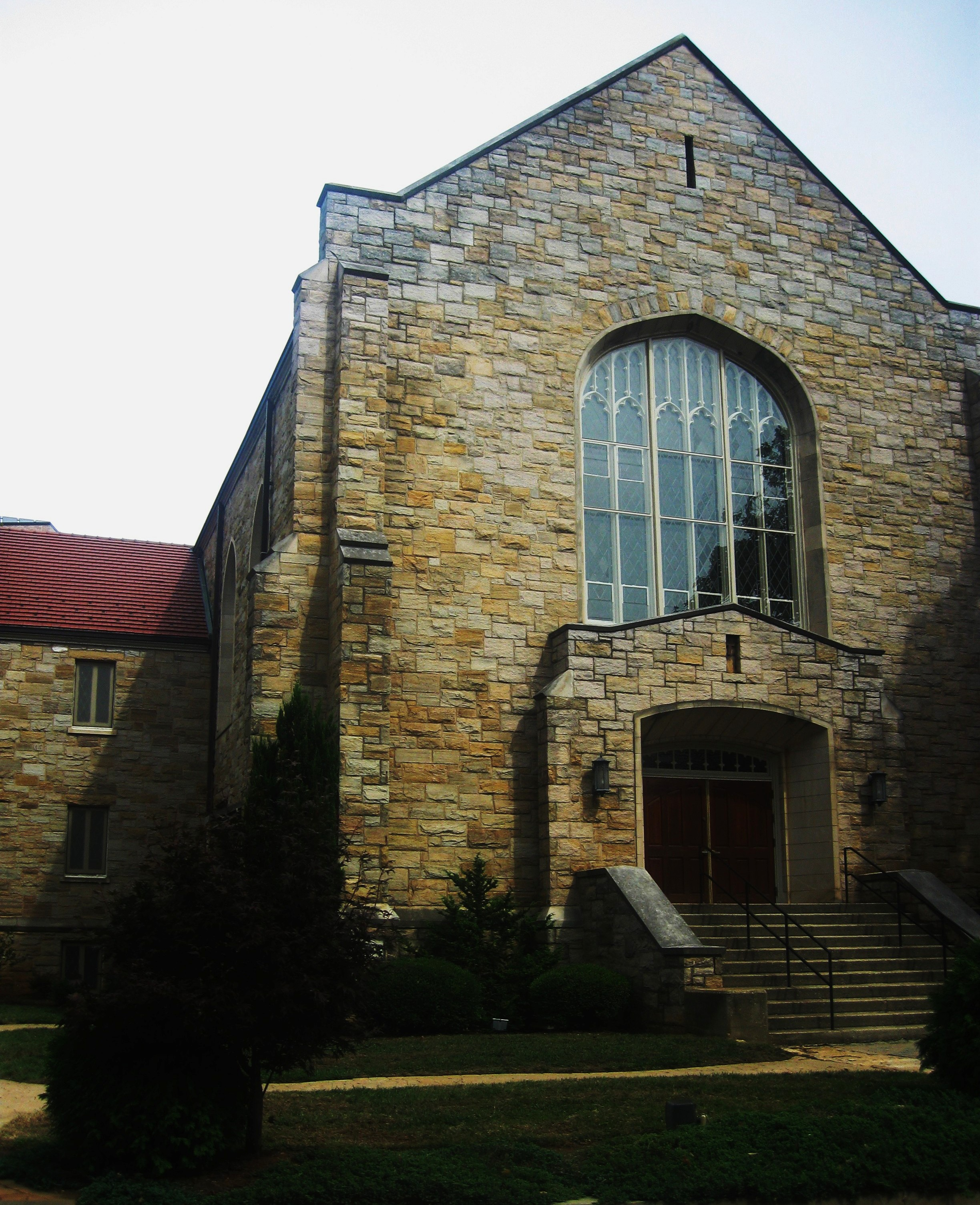

Religion
- Affiliation: Disciples of Christ

Location
- Location: Raleigh, North Carolina, United States
- Interactive map of Hillyer Memorial Christian Church

Hillyer Memorial Christian Church is a historic church in downtown Raleigh, North Carolina located on Hillsborough Street. The church is affiliated with the Disciples of Christ. The current church was built in 1915. The church is named after the Hillyer family, who were patrons of the church and kept the church from going bankrupt during the Great Depression and the World Wars. The church is under the jurisdiction of the Church of the Disciples of Christ in North Carolina.

Lillian Frances Parker Wallace was choir director. Paul Conway conducted the choir in the 1970s - 1990s.
