= Seven pillars =

Seven pillars may refer to:

- Seven Pillars for Prosperity, policy statement of the Progressive Canadian Party
- Seven Pillars Institute for Global Finance and Ethics (SPI) in Lawrence, Kansas
- Seven pillars of Ismailism in Shia Islam and in Nizari Ismailism
- Seven pillars of scholarly wisdom by the Jesus Seminar
- Seven Pillars of Wisdom, the autobiographical account of T. E. Lawrence ("Lawrence of Arabia")
- The Seven Pillars of Life described by Daniel E. Koshland
- The Seven Pillars of Servant Leadership, a book by James Sipe and Don Frick
- Seven Pillars, a Miami Indian historic trading ground near Peoria, Miami County, Indiana
- SCONUL's seven pillars of information literacy in Learning development by the Society of College, National and University Libraries

== See also ==
- III: Tabula Rasa or Death and the Seven Pillars, an album by Dutch rock group The Devil's Blood
- Five pillars (disambiguation)
- Sixth Pillar of Islam
- Twelve Pillars to Peace and Prosperity Party
