= Pill =

Pill or The Pill may refer to:

== Drugs ==
- Pill (pharmacy), referring to anything small for a specific dose of medicine
- "The Pill", a general nickname for the combined oral contraceptive pill

== Film and television ==
- The Pill (film), a 2011 film
- "The Pill", a 1999 episode of That '70s Show

== Music ==
- "The Pill" (song), a song by Loretta Lynn
- The Pills, American rock band
- "The Pill", a song by The Brothers-in-Law
- "Pills", a song by Bo Diddley
- "Pills", a song by Joji from In Tongues
- "Pills", a song by The Mess Hall from Notes from a Ceiling
- "Pills", a song by St. Vincent from Masseduction

== Places ==
- Pil (placename) or Pill, a placename element of Welsh origin
- Pill, Tyrol, a municipality in Austria
- Pill, Somerset, a village in England, United Kingdom
- Pillgwenlly or Pill, an electoral ward in Newport, South Wales, United Kingdom
- Pill Priory, near Milford Haven in Pembrokeshire, Wales, United Kingdom
- Pill Hill, Oakland, California, a Neighborhood in Oakland, California

== Other uses ==
- Pill (surname), list of people with the surname
- Pill (rapper) (born 1986), American rapper
- Pill (textile), a small ball of fuzz on cloth, or the creation of such fuzz balls

== See also ==
- Les Pilles, a commune in France
