= Hillsborough Street =

Street in Raleigh, North Carolina, USA

Coordinates: 35.7947482°N 78.6911352°W

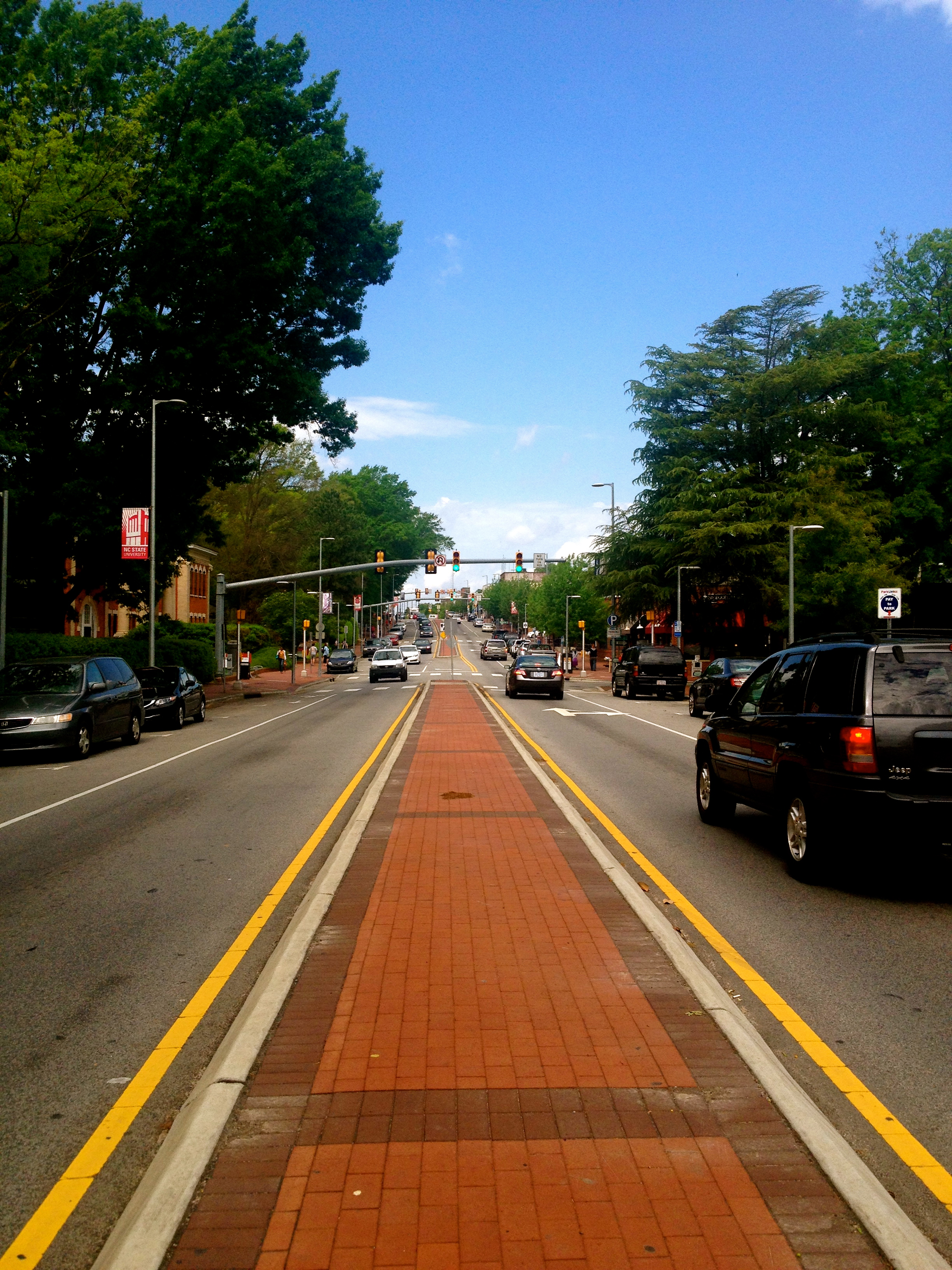
Hillsborough Street

Hillsborough Street is a business and cultural thoroughfare through Raleigh, North Carolina, United States. The street serves as a center for social life among North Carolina State University and Meredith College students.

Bars, restaurants, coffee shops, convenience stores and banks are located along a strip of Hillsborough Street that borders the university. The road is also a busy transport corridor, linking the town of Cary with downtown Raleigh. Additionally, the road passes by the North Carolina State University College of Veterinary Medicine, North Carolina State University Centennial Biomedical Campus, the North Carolina State Fairgrounds, Sacred Heart Church, and Raleigh's Pullen Park.

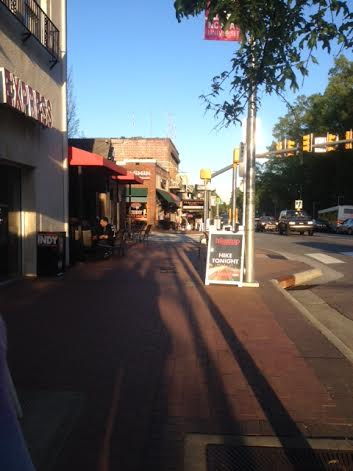
Hillsborough Street in Raleigh

== Route description ==
Hillsborough Street begins at the Cary/Raleigh line in west Raleigh as a continuation of Chatham Street. Traveling east closely alongside the CSX railroad tracks it passes through a mixed-use area with small industries, older neighborhoods, and restaurants and other small businesses alongside the road. At about 1.2 miles (1.9 km), the roadway splits as Hillsborough Street meets Western Boulevard; Hillsborough Street follows the westbound lanes and Western follows the eastbound lanes. This arrangement continues for about 0.5 miles (0.80 km), at the middle of which is the northern terminus of Jones Franklin Road. Hillsborough Street turns off the roadway on a two-way road due north, while Western Boulevard continues east on the same roadway.

After 0.5 miles (0.80 km) Hillsborough Street merges on to NC 54 (west of this interchange, NC 54 continues as Chapel Hill Street), and turns east, now on the opposite side of the CSX tracks. The road passes the North Carolina State Fairgrounds and the North Carolina State University College of Veterinary Medicine before an interchange with Interstate 440 (exit 3 on I-440), at which NC 54 reaches its eastern terminus. After I-440 the road passes to the south of the main entrance of Meredith College. After an intersection with Faircloth Street and Gorman Street, the roadway passes through a small commercial district with restaurants and small shops before entering the main campus of North Carolina State University, crossing Dan Allen Drive. Commercial buildings continue on the north side of the street, while several campus buildings line the right side, dominated by the main tower of the D.H. Hill Library. The route through campus features a wide, pedestrian-friendly median and several traffic circles that serve as traffic calming devices. At the east end of campus is a larger traffic circle that serves as the intersection between Hillsborough Street, Pullen Road, and Oberlin Road, just to the south of this lies the North Carolina State University Memorial Bell Tower. Leaving campus, the road passes through a medium density residential district, with townhouses lining the street. There's a traffic circle with Morgan Street as the road passes by Saint Mary's School, before entering Downtown Raleigh.

At Glenwood Avenue the road splits into two one-way streets, with Hillsborough Street continuing eastbound, and Edenton Street westbound. Within downtown, the road passes by a number of new high-rise office buildings, interspersed with older businesses, such as restaurants and hotels. Sacred Heart Church, the former cathedral for the Roman Catholic Diocese of Raleigh, lies on the north side of the road in between the one-way Dawson and McDowell Streets, which carry US 401, US 70, and NC 50, while on the south side of the same block is the Norman Adrian Wiggins School of Law. First Baptist Church lies on the north side of the next block, just as Hillsborough Street reaches its western terminus at Salisbury Street, facing the west façade of the North Carolina State Capitol.

== History ==
Hillsborough Street takes its name from the city Hillsborough, a former capital city of North Carolina. Like many downtown Raleigh streets, the street's name is derived from a city of the same name in the state; though, initially the street was named Hillsboro Road and was a country road many people used to drive to Hillsborough. The street was first constructed in 1792 as part of the capital city's initial layout.

The land comprising Hillsborough Street was once the site of the plantation of David Cameron. Cameron established St. Mary's College on Hillsborough Street; the school later became a private girls' school, St. Mary's School. A streetcar traversing Hillsborough Street connected North Carolina State University to Raleigh shortly after the college was built.

The street was the site of North Carolina's largest anti-Vietnam War marches, with 10,000 people, including NCSU, UNC and Duke students, protesting the war.

On the evening of November 23, 1963, a day after the assassination of President John F Kennedy, Lee Harvey Oswald attempted (unsuccessfully) to place a call from the Dallas City Jail to an individual residing at 201 Hillsborough Street (the physical residence no longer exists). This mysterious call attempt has been detailed and discussed by Dr. Grover B. Proctor in his article "The Raleigh Call and the Fingerprints of Intelligence".

== Places of worship ==
Hillsborough Street historic churches include:

- Sacred Heart Church
- Pullen Memorial Baptist Church
- Hillyer Memorial Christian Church
- Church of the Good Shepherd

== Special events ==
=== Packapalooza ===
Packapalooza is an all-day block party held annually on Hillsborough Street in August during the first Saturday of NCSU's fall semester: the first week of school for the incoming freshman class. First beginning in 2012, the festival has featured local and out-of-state musical acts playing as main headliner. The festival has been described as the 'block party of the city' by The News & Observer, and as part of the university's "identity" and "pride".

=== Krispy Kreme Challenge ===
The Krispy Kreme Challenge, a race invented and organized by NC State Park Scholars with a majority of runners attending NC State, is a new NC State tradition which attracted over 7,500 runners in 2010. Part of Hillsborough Street is closed in order for runners to make their way from the NC State Bell Tower to the Krispy Kreme on Peace Street. The objective is to run to the Krispy Kreme, eat one dozen doughnuts, and run back to the Bell Tower in under one hour. The event raises money to support the North Carolina Children's Hospital, and in 2010 raised $122 million.

=== City of Oaks Marathon ===
The City of Oaks Marathon, along with its half marathon, 10k, and 5k events, annually attract thousands of athletes to the city for the first Sunday of November. The course has received positive reception for mix of urban and natural landmarks along the course including Hillsborough Street, and mixed reception for its natural obstacles including a number of hills, and the time of year it takes place often producing cold running conditions.

=== Basketball and football victories ===
Following every football and basketball win the NCSU Bell Tower is illuminated red and students are encouraged to "Storm the Bell Tower" and show their Wolfpack pride. After the NC State men's basketball team won the national championship in 1983, students converged on Hillsborough Street to celebrate, with at least one injury to a police officer. Subsequently, the police department cracked down on problem bars on Hillsborough Street, which resulted in many bar closures. The closures included seven bars located at Hillsborough Square.

=== Paint the Town Red and NCSU Homecoming ===
As part of NCSU's homecoming week since 2006, many businesses along Hillsborough Street agree to have groups of NCSU students paint their windows red, the main athletic color of the NC State Wolfpack. The spectacle was deemed "Paint the Town Red". Each year, alumni, students, faculty and staff as well as Wolfpack faithful fill the NC State Campus and surrounding areas painting the town red. Onlookers congregate on Hillsborough Street for the annual Homecoming Parade and watch as dozens of school floats make their way towards the Bell Tower.

=== WRAL-TV Raleigh Christmas Parade ===
A Christmas parade is held along Hillsborough Street among other Raleigh streets every November. The event, sponsored by WRAL-TV attracts Raleighites, NCSU students, and visitors.

=== Susan G. Komen Race for the Cure ===
The Komen NC Triangle Race for the Cure, hosted at Meredith College, raises funds and awareness for the fight against breast cancer, celebrates breast cancer survivorship, and honors those who have lost their battle with the disease. All net funds from the Komen Race for the Cure go to research, education, screening and treatment programs.

=== 9/11 Memorial Service ===
On the tenth anniversary of September 11, 2001 NC State Chancellor Randy Woodson lead the campus and community in a memorial service at the Bell Tower honoring all those who perished in the events of 9/11. The service paid tribute to all NCSU alumni who have served in the military. To coincide with this event, the Hillsborough Street Community Service Corporation enlisted the help of over 35 NCSU student groups and organizations to decorate the store-fronts on Hillsborough Street with patriotic imagery. These groups volunteered their time to show their support for, and appreciation of, all the first responders and citizens who lost their lives on that day in 2001. They also thanked all the troops who have served and continue to serve the US in the armed services.

=== Art to Wear ===
Art to Wear is an annual fashion show featuring the creations of NC State students. The NCSU College of Design and College of Textiles team together to showcase the young talent that can be found at NC State as well as its connectivity to the clothing design merchants found around Raleigh, NC. The event is normally followed by an after event which fills the local establishments with customers long into the night.

== Notable businesses ==
One notable business on Hillsborough Street is Players' Retreat, a saloon that opened more than 50 years ago. The bar encompasses a former restaurant, the Morning Room, which served as the unofficial headquarters of Hargrove Bowles' 1972 gubernatorial campaign against Jim Holshauser. It was also a hangout of the Wolfpack basketball players, of Norman Sloan, in the 1970s. Mitch's Tavern was used for scenes in the film Bull Durham in the 1980s. The publishing company Lulu is headquartered on Hillsborough Street.

== Education institutions ==
There are four major education institutions located on Hillsborough Street. The first, and largest, of these is North Carolina State University, with over 34,000 students, and 6,000 faculty and staff. Meredith College is located on the street, with approximately 2,200 female students and 138 faculty members, Meredith College has grown to become one of the largest independent private women's college in the United States. The third education institution is the all-girls boarding and day school St. Mary's School for grades 9–12. Norman Adrian Wiggins School of Law of Campbell University lies near the eastern terminus of the street.

== Hillsborough Street Community Service Corporation ==
The Hillsborough Street Community Service Corporation is an independent, not for profit, business improvement district created by a partnership between the City of Raleigh, NC State University and the property owners and businesses on Hillsborough Street in the fall of 2009. The HSCSC territory is about 2.5 miles long running on both sides of Hillsborough Street from St. Mary's School to the beltline (including Morgan St. and a few side streets) and includes a collection of businesses, organizations, institutions and residential options.

The corporation's mission is to make the Hillsborough Street community a destination in Raleigh by providing services and programs that improve the economic sustainability of the businesses, and increases the market value of the properties.
