= Saved by the 90s =

Cover band

Saved by the 90s is a live cover band and party focusing on culture and nostalgia from the 1990s. It was created in 2010 by Nat Esten, Danny Finerman, and Alex Rossiter. In 2016, Broadway actress Emily Afton took over as a full-time female vocalist.

The show originated in New York City and has productions in Boston, San Francisco, Los Angeles, the Midwest, Florida, and Texas. The show has played music venues such as Webster Hall, House of Blues Chicago, Rams Head Live!, The NorVA, Trocadero, The Showbox, Terminal 5, The Fonda Theatre, House of Blues San Diego, House of Blues Orlando, House of Blues Las Vegas, Brooklyn Bowl, Jones Beach Theater, The Middle East, and Exit/In. Dressing up in 1990s clothes is encouraged.

In the past, Saved by the 90s shows have featured celebrity guests such as:

- Aaron Carter
- AJ McLean
- Chris Barron
- Coolio
- Dennis Haskins
- DJ Jazzy Jeff
- Dolores O'Riordan
- Dustin "Screech" Diamond
- Mark McGrath
- Naughty By Nature
- Sophie B. Hawkins

As of 2014, the band had sold over 100,000 tickets nationwide. In 2017, the band played a holiday party for Billboard-Hollywood Reporter Media Group, with the late Cranberries singer Dolores O'Riordan, in what turned out to be her final performance. In 2017, the Boston Globe cited their show as having an "improbably eclectic playlist."

== Representation ==
The band is currently represented by United Talent Agency.
