= Pilar (surname) =

Pilar or Pilař is a surname. In Spanish language, this surname is derived from "Maria del Pilar", a reference to Mary, mother of Jesus.

In Czech (pilař), and Serbo-Croatian (pìlār, pilar) the surname literally means the occupation of sawyer. The Czech-language feminine form is Pilarová or Pilařová.

Notable people with this surname include:

- Đuro Pilar (1846–1893), Croatian geologist, professor and rector at the University of Zagreb
- Eva Pilarová (1939–2020), Czech jazz and pop music singer, actress and photographer
- Fernando Pilar (born 1979), Brazilian football player
- Gladys del Pilar (born 1967), Swedish singer and dancer
- Gregorio del Pilar (1875–1899), one of the youngest generals in the Philippine Revolutionary Forces during the Philippine Revolution
- Ivo Pilar (1874–1933), Croatian historian, politician and jurist, considered the father of Croatian geopolitics
- Karel Pilař (born 1977), Czech professional ice hockey player
- Karolína Pilařová, female Czech curler
- Marcelo H. del Pilar (1850–1896), Filipino writer, journalist, satirist and revolutionary leader of the Philippine Revolution
- María del Pilar Pereyra (born 1978), Argentine butterfly swimmer
- Marivic Co-Pilar (born 1971), Filipino politician
- Pío del Pilar (1860–1931), revolutionary general of the Philippines
- Radek Pilař (1931–1993), Czech artist and cartoonist
- Roman Pilar (1894–1937), Soviet security and intelligence officer
- Václav Pilař (born 1988), Czech football player
- América del Pilar Rodrigo (20th century), Argentinian botanist

== See also ==
- Pilarz (surname)
