= Team 5P =

South Korean animation studio

Team 5P (Korean: 오인용) is an animation production team established in 2002. The first members were Hongsuk Kim (Kee-mong), Sangsik Min (Sickman), Donghyuk Jang (Seedrock), Sukjo Jang (Devil), Jihyuk Jung (Guy Hyuk), and Junghoon Ji (Back-gun). They drew many kinds of animations. Their work appears in productions such as "The Hell of Selfish and Immoral Entertainers” (Korean: 연예인지옥), "The Middle-Aged Detective Kim Jung Il", and "The Banana Girl (unsuitable for under 19-years-old)".

== Private Kim Chang-who's Desertion ==
“Private Kim Chang-who's Desertion” is divided into two stories. One story describes the time that Kim Chang-who joined a party. He could not stand many reproaches from his superiors. He deserted remaining his diary and ran away, stealing a duck from a farm. The other story describes the time after Kim deserted his party. He was captured by his captain, Kim Hong-suk, just before he took a traffic to his home. He was imprisoned in the guardhouse with his superiors.

== The Hell of Entertainers ==
The flash animation series is the most popular animation of the team. Many kinds of military service problems were dealt in this animation.

=== Series of Moonoejoong ===
In 2002, Team 5P made the first series of "The Hell of Entertainers" which Heejun Moon (in this series, he is featured as "Moonoejoong; literally, A No-brained Bug") who is due to join the 666 party is featuring. In this first series, Moonoejoong is scolded by many superiors, including a foolish and fault maker, Kim Chang-who. One day night, He dreamt of what he sings rock'n roll, when he sings shouting, making most of his fans wild with enthusiasm. At that time, his superior, Jung Ji-hyuk wakes him up, and scolded while he was still sleeping. This day, Moonoejoong couldn't have any supper because he waste his breakfast into the trash box after Kim Chang-who told him about a patty on a Military Hamburger, while he miss twice in a football game; one is his own goal, the other is speaking what Jung Ji-hyuk missed a penalty kick. He couldn't have any supper until his sleeping time.

=== Series of Stivoong Yoo ===
Another entertainer, Steve Yoo (Korean name; Seungjun YOO) featured as "Stivoong YOO(No literal meaning but similar to his name)." Steve is a naturalized American to avoid the military duty in South Korea in February 2002. At first of the series, he told his party supervisor that he was due to join the American Army. However, the supervisor scold and strike him even Stivoong cried that he is about to join the American Army. Likewise Moonoejoong, he is scolded by his superiors. From joined day on, he is defeated seriously. After a while, Jung Ji-hyuk told Kim Chang-who, "boil my noodle pack." Kim Chang-who spit into the pack boiling noodle, Moonoejoong found his situation and reported to Jung Ji-hyuk. Thus, in the evening, Kim was beat seriously by Jung for the reason.

The next day, in the morning roll call, everybody sing the South Korean national anthem Aegukga, Stivoong murmured without any sound. The supervisor found his state and called him. The supervisor let him sing the anthem, but he couldn't sing. Then everybody kicked him. When everybody prepared a run, but Stivoong reports his waist-ache. So everybody punched and kicked him.

Some days later, imprisoned superior Choi Hyun-il returns this party, but Stivoong misunderstood him as a new joined private. But Kim Chang-who shouted Choi is his superior, then Choi beats Stivoong. In fact, by reason of what Steve is a Christian, virtual character Stivoong wanted to go to church, but refused by his superior. Instead, he went to military temple. He was scolded for praying during the Buddhist ceremony. Moreover, he was kicked by Choi Hyun-il because he didn't receive but catch a ball in the kick-ball game while Moonoejoong was punched by two superiors because of ball double-touch. Stivoong is beat again by Jung Ji-hyuk because of entering into the bathtub ignoring the priority. In the evening roll call, Stivoong was punished again by the captain of his party because he didn't pick up a disassembled segment sweeping inside of his K-2 rifle. The next day, he punished seriously because he fired by accident during post-safety checking. At that time, the party lost an empty cartridge. but it was occurred to obtain as an accessory by Moonoejoong. Moonoejoong hid this cartridge onto the book. He opened a book and pick up a cartridge. However he dropped a cartridge while Jung Ji-hyuk was coming in and pick up. Despite Moonoejoong shouted that he had found the lost cartridge and he would return, he was punched and kicked by Jung Ji-hyuk and Choi Hyun-il. Some days later, Kim Chang-who failed to promote for failure of shooting test.
