= Pillar Rock =

Pillar Rock may refer to:

- Pillar Rock (Washington)
- Pillar Rock (California)
- Pillar Rock, a rock formation in England, see Pillar (Lake District)
