= Pillow (disambiguation) =

A pillow is a cushion for the head.

Pillow may also refer to:

== Places ==
- Pillow, Pennsylvania, United States, a borough
- Pillow Knob, Queen Elizabeth Land, Antarctica
- Pillow Creek, British Columbia, Canada
- Pillow Ridge, a volcanic ridge in British Columbia, Canada
- Pillow Rock, near South Georgia Island, South Atlantic Ocean

== People ==
- Frank Pillow (born 1965), American former National Football League wide receiver
- Gideon Johnson Pillow (1806–1878), American Civil War Confederate general, lawyer and politician
- Ray Pillow (1937–2023), American country music singer
- Pillow (bodybuilder), American retired bodybuilder and exotic dancer Theresa Bell (born 1956)

== Music ==
=== Groups ===
- The Pillows, a Japanese band

=== Songs ===
- "Pillow", from Dogman by King's X
- "Pillow", from Expectations by Bebe Rexha
- "Pillow", from Homesongs by Adem Ilhan
- "The Pillow", from Geffery Morgan by UB40

== Other uses ==
- Pillow, successor project to the Python Imaging Library
- Pillow Academy, an independent, co-educational college preparatory school in unincorporated Leflore County, Mississippi
- Pillow Flying Artillery, a Confederate artillery battery in the American Civil War
- Pillow Featherbed, a Lalaloopsy character
- Pillow, a character from the fourth season of Battle for Dream Island, an animated web series

== See also ==
- USS General Pillow, a gunboat captured and used by the Union Navy during the American Civil War
- The Pillow Book, Japanese book completed in the year 1002
- The Pillow Book (film), a 1996 film
- The "Pillow symbol", ⌑, a name used in the travel industry for the square lozenge
