= Barrio El Pilar =

Coordinates: 41°10′44″S 71°21′04″W

- Municipality and village
- Interactive map of Barrio El Pilar
- Country: Argentina
- Province: Río Negro Province
- Time zone: UTC−3 (ART)

Barrio El Pilar is a village and municipality in Río Negro Province in Argentina.
