= Pilarz (surname) =

Pilarz is Polish-language surname literally meaning sawyer (occupation). Notable people with this surname include:

- Grzegorz Pilarz (born 1980), Polish volleyball player
- Józef Pilarz (1956–2008), Polish politician
- Krzysztof Pilarz (born 1980), Polish football goalkeeper
- Scott Pilarz (1959–2021), American Jesuit priest, President of Marquette University, former President of the University of Scranton

== See also ==
- Pilar (surname)
