= Five pillars =

Five Pillars or five pillars may refer to:

- Five Pillars of Islam, often regarded as basic religious acts of Muslim life
- Five pillars puzzle, a mechanical puzzle also known as Baguenaudier and five pillars problem
- Five pillars (Vietnam), the five most important political leaders of Vietnam
- Five Pillars of cyber security, the framework for the United States military cyberwarfare
- Five Pillars of Reform in the Modernising Government Programme in India
- Five Pillars of Statesmanship and 5 Pillar Certification in the Thomas Jefferson Education methodology
- Five Pillars of success at the St. Richard's Episcopal School
- The five pillars of the Third Industrial Revolution, a theory by Jeremy Rifkin
- Five pillars of the Delta Xi Phi sorority at the University of Illinois
- Five pillars of the Armenian Youth Federation
- 5Pillars, a British online Islamic newspaper

== See also ==
- Four Pillars (disambiguation)
- Sixth Pillar of Islam
- Seven pillars (disambiguation)
