= Pilars =

Pilars may refer to:

- Juan Pilars (died 1521), a Spanish clergyman, appointed in 1514 as archbishop of Cagliari, Sardinia, Italy
- Portuguese and Spanish for pillars

== See also ==
- Pilars de Pilar (disambiguation)
