= Three pillars =

Three pillars may refer to:

- The Three Estates of the realm
- Three pillars of Sikhism
- Three pillars of the European Union
- Three Pillars of Chinese Catholicism
- Three pillars of sustainability
- The Three Pillars of Zen (2000), a book by Philip Kapleau
- The three pillars or columns in the Kabbalistic Tree of Life
- The three pillars of income support, a policy proposal by The New Physiocrats

== See also ==
- Four Pillars (disambiguation)
