= Four Pillars (Geneva Association) =

Economic policy research programme

The Four Pillars is a research programme set up in 1987 by the Geneva Association, also known as the International Association for the Study of Insurance Economics. The aim of the Four Pillars research programme is to study the key importance in the new service economy of Social Security, Insurance, Savings and Employment. The programme focuses on the future of pensions, welfare and employment. The Geneva Association launched its Four Pillars research programme with a view to identifying possible solutions to the issue of the future financing of pensions and, more generally, to organising social security systems in our post-industrial societies. Demographic trends - especially increased life and health expectancy - could be seen as positive if we were able to devise ways of enabling "ageing in good-health populations" to make a valid economic and social contribution to the functioning of our service economies over the decades to come.

The concept of the Four Pillars owes its origin to the fact that in most countries the funding of pensions is based on three pillars:

- The 1st pillar: the compulsory, pay-as-you-go, state pension;
- The 2nd pillar: the supplementary (often funding-based) occupational pension;
- The 3rd pillar: individual savings (personal pension and assets and life insurance).

The Geneva Association advocated in its publications and seminars a strengthening of the 2nd pillar and further development of 3rd pillar resources. However, the attention of the Geneva Association has focused above all on a 4th pillar i.e. the future need for a flexible extension of work-life, mainly on a part-time basis, in order to supplement income from the three existing pillars. The reorganization of end-of-career and the new age-management strategy - in which gradual retirement is destined to play a key role - involved in establishing this pillar, also correspond to many of the changes (e.g. in quality of work and the life cycle) that are specific to our contemporary service economies.

== Main objectives ==
The research programme has had four main objectives:

- Analysis of the key elements in organizing old-age security systems
- Research of conditions for multi-pillar systems of pension financing
- Encouragement of complementary solutions to the challenges of a changing welfare state and new life-cycles, in particular of the key importance of a flexible extension of working life, that is the building of a 4th pillar
- Understanding the role of insurance in the provision of old-age security systems

== Main activities ==
Over the years, the main activities of the Four Pillars programme have included:

- Undertaking research on key issues and contributing to research undertaken by international networks (e.g. World Bank, International Social Security Association, European Commission, GINA, World Economic Forum, etc.)
- The four plans
- Stimulating pension and similar experts in reconsidering mainstream research and encouraging alternative views and approaches
- Organizing seminars and conferences on these topics and participating in international events (e.g. European Commission, OECD, CSIS, insurance companies, national governments, universities, research centers, etc.)
- Publishing numerous materials such as books, special issues of The Geneva Papers on Risk and Insurance (one dedicated issue every two years), The Four Pillars Newsletter (two a year), dedicated issues of the working papers "Etudes & Dossiers", brochures in English and French for a wider public, contributions to academic and professional reviews, etc.

== Relevance to the insurance sector ==
The Four Pillars research programme is relevant to the insurance sector in six main areas:

- Global partnership between the public and private sectors

The current need for reforming social security has been felt in all countries. The main objective of this reform has been to reduce the hitherto substantial share of the GDP devoted to social expenditure. The key challenge here has been to consolidate the partnership between the public and private sectors. Almost all States have had to redesign or readjust their welfare policies on health and pensions so as to avoid creating public deficits which would otherwise place too great a burden upon future generations.

- Development of second and third pillar pensions

With recent and current reforms of public pensions aimed at future sustainability - involving inevitably a fall in the relative level of old-age benefits - the development of second and third pillar pensions has become a priority. In many countries, second pillar pensions have been made compulsory and, where not already compulsory, have been encouraged by all kinds of financial and fiscal incentives. Private pension funds will play a growing role in securing future retirement income.

- Promotion of an extension of working life, i.e. of a fourth pillar

It however must be understood that even substantial development of second and third pillar pensions will probably not be sufficient to compensate both longer life-expectancy and a rising proportion of people over 65 years. With good health expectancy it is not only possible but also essential to plan for flexible extension of working life. Pension funds must encourage and facilitate this extension which will also benefit the insurance sector workforce.

- Encouragement of global savings and life insurance

In a more general way, it is essential to encourage long-term savings for retirement and longer-life expectancy. Insurance companies have a key role in designing adequate and tailored products to cater to a wide range of needs and means.

- Age management

In insurance, as in other sectors of the economy, workforce ageing will require planning for improved age management as a matter of urgency. The Geneva Association's studies at the European and international levels have shown that, among other things, continuing training, worktime reduction, job redesign and a review of the seniority-pay principle, will need increasingly to be addressed by individual insurance companies. Codes of employment might be an ideal place to start in developing new age management strategies.

- Devate and communication

Developing multi-pillar pension systems and promoting an extension of occupational life depend on certain conditions being met and will need to be preceded by a coherent, broad-based, informed and ongoing debate of all these issues. With the research programme and its fourth-pillar proposals, the Geneva Association has been able to do pioneer work in this field and has (probably) made a significant contribution to this all-important debate.

== Publications ==
- Working Beyond 60: Key Policies and Practices in Europe, by Geneviève REDAY-MULVEY / February 2005, Palgrave Macmillan
- The Four Pillars, Geneva Association Information Newsletter, The Geneva Association
- Etudes et Dossiers, Working Paper Series, The Geneva Association
- The Geneva Risk and Insurance Review, formerly The Geneva Papers on Risk and Insurance Theory (until March 2005), The Geneva Association & Springer
- Special Issue on the Four Pillars, The Future of Pensions and Retirement Income, and Working Beyond 60, The Geneva Papers on Risk and Insurance - Issues and Practice, Vol.30 - No.4 / October 2005, Palgrave Macmillan
- Studies on the Four Pillars, Age and Employment: the Firm and the State and The Future of Pension, The Geneva Papers on Risk and Insurance - Issues and Practice, Vol.28 - No.4 / October 2003, Palgrave Macmillan
- Global Ageing and Pension Organisation, The Geneva Papers on Risk and Insurance - Issues and Practice, Vol.27 - No.4 / October 2002, Palgrave Macmillan
- Studies on the Four Pillars, The Geneva Papers on Risk and Insurance - Issues and Practice, Vol.26 - No.4 / October 2001, Palgrave Macmillan
- Studies on the Four Pillars, Financing Pensions in the Future, and New Policies at the End of Career, The Geneva Papers on Risk and Insurance - Issues and Practice, Vol.24 - No.4 / October 1999, Palgrave Macmillan
- Studies on the Four Pillars, The Geneva Papers on Risk and Insurance - Issues and Practice, No.81 / October 1996
- Studies on the Four Pillars, The Geneva Papers on Risk and Insurance - Issues and Practice, No.73 / October 1994
- Studies on the Four Pillars, The Geneva Papers on Risk and Insurance - Issues and Practice, No.62 / January 1992
- Studies on the Four Pillars, The Geneva Papers on Risk and Insurance - Issues and Practice, No.55 / April 1990
- The Four Pillars, Aids and Other Insurance Issues, The Geneva Papers on Risk and Insurance - Issues and Practice, No.49 / October 1988
