= Piller =

Piller may refer to:

- Piller, a district of the municipality of Fließ, Tyrol, Austria
- Anton Piller order, court order which provides for the right to search premises without prior warning

== People ==
- József Piller (born 1988), Hungarian footballer
- Michael Piller (1948-2005), television scriptwriter and producer
- René Piller (born 1965), French racewalker

== See also ==
- Pillar (disambiguation)
- Peeler (disambiguation)
