= Pillar of Fire =

Pillar of Fire may refer to:

== Religion ==
- Pillar of fire (theophany), a manifestation of God in the Hebrew Bible
- Pillar of Fire International, a Methodist denomination

== Arts and entertainment ==
- Pillar of Fire (album), a 2024 album by Thy Will Be Done
- Pillar of Fire (ballet), a 1942 ballet by Antony Tudor
- Pillar of Fire (film), a 1959 Israeli film
- Pillar of Fire (novel), a 1995 novel by Judith Tarr
- Pillar of Fire (sculpture), a 2013 sculpture by William Cochran
- Pillar of Fire (TV series), an Israeli television series
- The Pillar of Fire, an 1899 French film
- Pillar of Fire: America in the King Years, 1963–65, a 1998 book by Taylor Branch
- Pillar of Fire and Other Plays a 1975 book of plays by Ray Bradbury
  - "Pillar of Fire", a short story in the 1966 short story collection S Is for Space by Ray Bradbury
- Pillar of Fire, a 1961 sculpture by Egon Weiner

== See also ==
- A Column of Fire, a 2017 novel by Ken Follett
