= Pill (surname) =

Pill is a surname. Notable people with the surname include:

- Alison Pill (born 1985), Canadian actress
- Brett Pill (born 1984), American baseball player
- Cathy Pill (born 1981), Belgian fashion designer
- Huw Pill, British economist, chief economist of the Bank of England
- Malcolm Pill (born 1938), British judge
- Tyler Pill (born 1990), American baseball player
- Willow Pill (born 1995), American drag queen
