= Six Pillars =

Six Pillars may refer to:

- Six Pillars House, house in South London
- The Six Pillars of Self-Esteem, book by Nathaniel Branden
- Six pillars in Singapore's defence strategy
- The Six Pillars, featured in The Five Greatest Warriors book
- Six pillars, a lifestyle observed by the Jesus Youth Catholic movement
