= Sixth Pillar of Islam =

There are only five Pillars of Islam that are universally accepted as the basis of Islamic practice. However, the Kharijites upheld the belief that Jihad may be considered the sixth pillar. In their interpretation, jihad could be an individual's internal struggle against baser instincts, the struggle to build a good Muslim society, or a war for the faith against unbelievers. Jihad is a vague term for the act of promoting Islam or improving observance of Islamic practices and may range from defending one's religion against aggressors when attacked to struggle against the lower self (against ones ego) meaning self-improvement .

In Twelver Shi'a Islam, the second-largest branch of Islam, jihad is one of the ten Practices of the Religion.

Jihad was brought up in controversial magazine Charlie Hebdo, which suffered a terrorist attack in 2015, stirred controversy with its coverage of Tariq Ramadan, with a headline that associated him with the Sixth Pillar of Islam. It was brought up since jihad is the pillar that sustains this type of practice in Islam.
