= Krispy Kreme Challenge =

Annual charity event

- Location: Raleigh, NC
- Event type: Road
- Distance: 5 miles (8.0 km)
- Beneficiary: North Carolina Children's Hospital
- Established: 2004
- Website: Official website

The Krispy Kreme Challenge is an annual charity event in which participants run a 2.5-mile (4 km) road course leading to a Krispy Kreme Doughnuts shop, eat one dozen doughnuts (totaling 2,400 calories and 144 grams of fat), and run the 2.5-mile (4 km) back to the finish line in under 1 hour. The event began in 2004 and is still planned and executed by Park Scholars at North Carolina State University in Raleigh N.C. Profits from the race are donated to North Carolina Children's Hospital, and the 2023 race brought total donations to over $2.1 million. The Krispy Kreme Challenge is not affiliated with the Krispy Kreme company.

== History ==
In December 2004, about a dozen friends gathered in the morning at the Belltower to try the challenge, which had begun as a college dare. Park Scholar Sophomore Ben Gaddy completed the race in 34 minutes, 27 seconds. After receiving positive coverage in the campus newspaper and profiled as #85 on the "102 More Things You Gotta Do Before You Graduate" by Sports Illustrated:On Campus, the event organizers decided to publicize the Krispy Kreme Challenge and turn it into a charity fundraising event. NC State basketball player Chris McCoy is credited with dreaming up the event but it was published that she overslept that morning and did not attend.

The 2nd Annual Krispy Kreme Challenge took place in January 2006. The turnout was much larger than the organizers had expected. Over 150 runners participated, with at least 40 runners completing the challenge. The fastest time was set by graduate student Edwin Barry, with a time of 29 minutes, 02 seconds. The event raised $800 for the North Carolina Children’s Hospital.

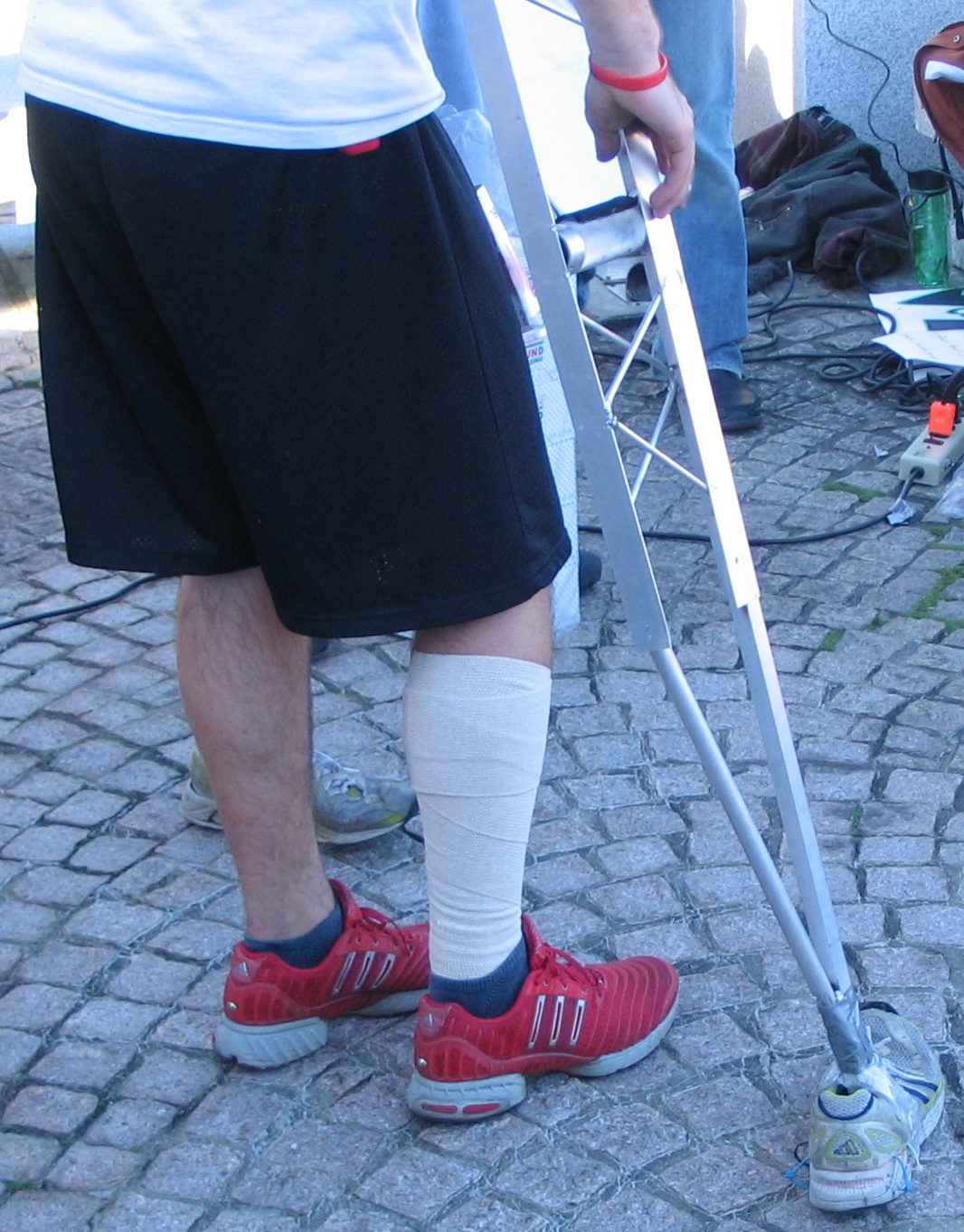
2007 KKC participant Tom Place with self-made custom-fabricated crutches.

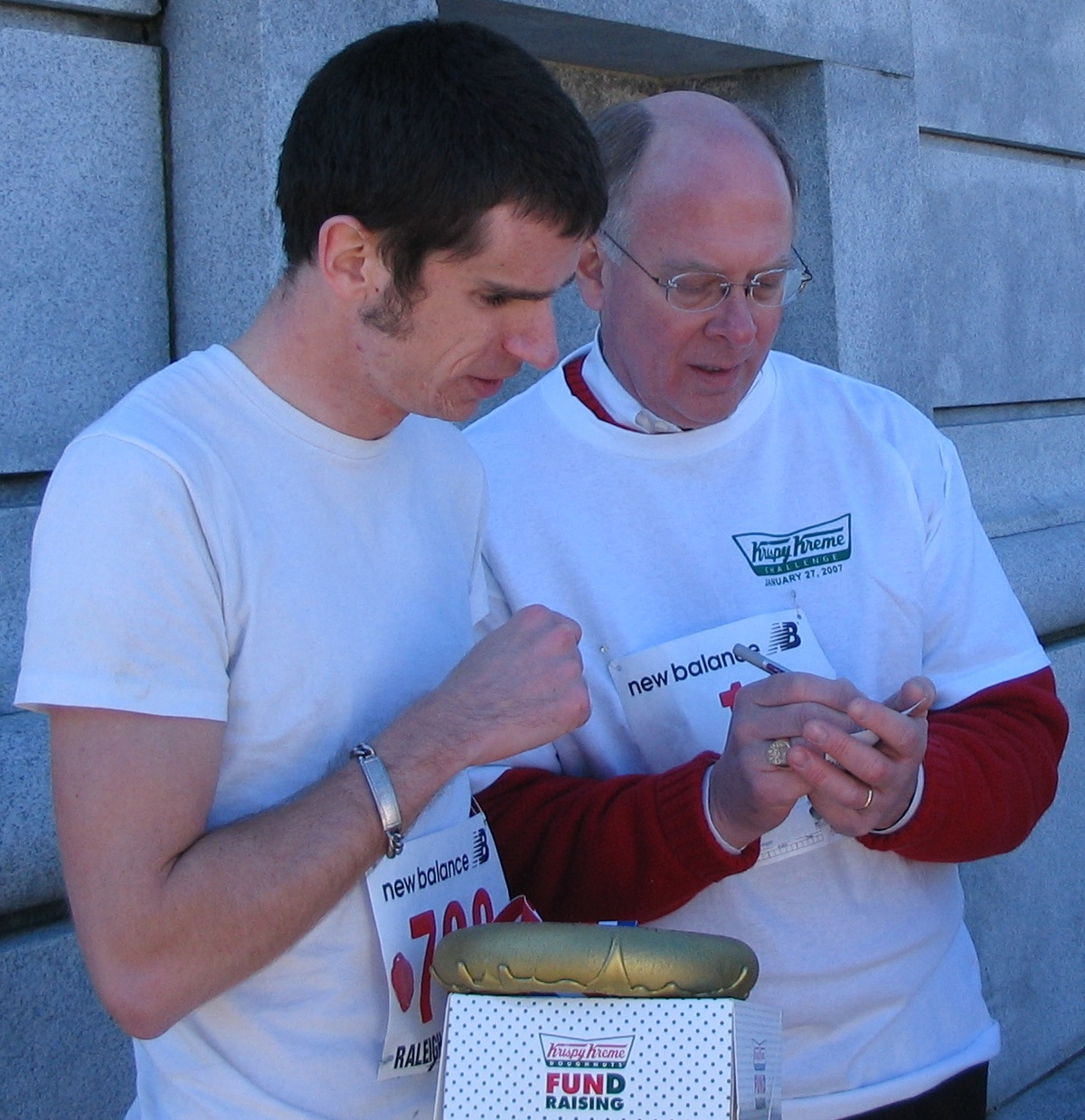
2007 KKC winner and course record-holder Auburn Staples (left) with then Chancellor James Oblinger.

Race participation in 2007 grew nearly tenfold. It was held on January 27 and, for the first time, significant planning went into the race. Contacts were made in the local running community of Raleigh, such as with the Raleigh Running Outfitters store owned by Jim Micheels. Sponsorships were also sought out in both money and prize donations. In contrast to the heat system used in the previous year, all the runners were to be released at the same time. This required the roads to be closed off and supervised by the Raleigh Police Department. New participant types were created, such as the "casual runner" and "observer" categories. This was done to accommodate interested people who wanted to participate but not eat the full dozen doughnuts.

Over 1,500 students and members of the Raleigh community showed up to participate. Over 1,000 dozen doughnuts were made and distributed by the Krispy Kreme store and over 450 people successfully finished the Challenge. NC State Chancellor James Oblinger blew the starting whistle. NC State undergrad Auburn Staples took first place with a time of 24 minutes, 31 seconds. This remains the fastest winning time ever registered for the event, but since both the physical route and the race logistics have been altered on several occasions, performances are not necessarily comparable from year to year. Notable 2007 participants included a member of the NC State Board of Trustees, the Student body president, a man dressed as Elvis, a pair of pirates riding a shopping cart, people on rollerblades, and a recently injured engineering student who custom-fabricated a pair of crutches (with old shoes for tips) in order to participate. The latter completed the course in 1 hour, 9 minutes.

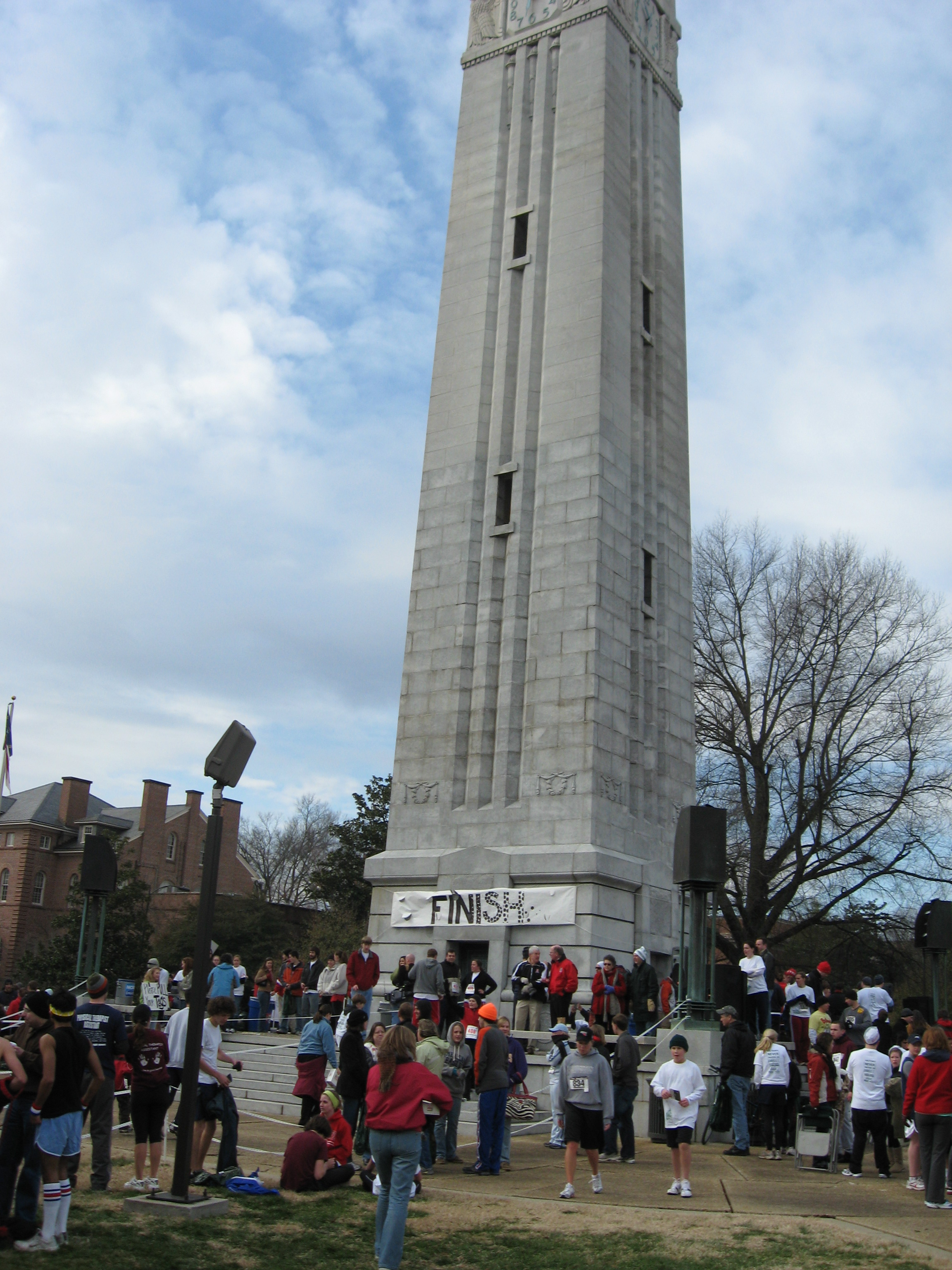
The finish for 2008 in front of the Memorial Bell Tower.

The fourth annual event was held Saturday, January 26, 2008 with a record 3,032 participating, and raised over $20,000. Additional doughnuts from a Krispy Kreme store in Fayetteville, North Carolina were trucked in to meet the day's demands. The fastest time was logged by Philip Curley at 31 minutes, 20 seconds.

The fifth Krispy Kreme Challenge was on February 7, 2009 and drew 5519 participants. The race had caught the eye of ESPN, which sent a reporter to cover and run in 2009. ESPN featured the "most difficult road race in the country" on SportsCenter and on its website. This year's race was also the first KKC to use a chip timing system. Before the race, runners were given ankle bracelets with chips embedded in them. As the runners crossed the finish line, sensors picked up radio signals emitted by the chips and automatically recorded their time. More than 5,500 participants took part in the student-run event this year, raising $35,000 for North Carolina Children's Hospital. In addition to the ESPN stories, newspapers across the country picked up the Associated Press story about the event on Sunday, under the headline: "Glazed and Confused Run Krispy Kreme Challenge."Costumes were popular, with several students arriving as their favorite superheroes, others dressed as Thing 1 and Thing 2 from the Dr. Seuss books, and more than one person dressed as a cup of coffee and a doughnut. One participant even completed the challenge wearing a full gorilla suit.

The sixth Krispy Kreme Challenge was held on February 6, 2010. Due to space limitations, the number of challengers was limited to 6000. 2010 was also marked by the launch of a new website for the Krispy Kreme Challenge.

The eighth Krispy Kreme Challenge was held on February 4, 2012. The number of challengers was increased to 7,500. Due to safety concerns, the course was lengthened to a total distance of approximately 5 miles (8 km).

The ninth Krispy Kreme Challenge was held on February 9, 2013. The number of challengers was 8,000. In total the challenge raised $184,000 for the N.C. Children's Hospital, bringing the total to $558,000 over the nine years of the challenge.

The tenth Krispy Kreme Challenge was held on February 8, 2014. The number of challengers was 7,537. In total the challenge raised $200,000 for the N.C. Children's Hospital, bringing the total to $758,000 over the ten years of the challenge.

The eleventh Krispy Kreme Challenge was held on February 7, 2015. The number of challengers was 6,868. In total the challenge raised $195,000 for the N.C. Children's Hospital, bringing the total to $953,000 over the eleven years of the challenge.

The twelfth Krispy Kreme Challenge was held on February 6, 2016. The number of challengers was 6,835. In total the challenge raised $195,000 for the N.C. Children's Hospital, bringing the total to $1.148 million over the twelve years of the challenge.

On February 6, 2016, a contestant died after dropping out of the race with chest pains during the first kilometre.

The thirteenth Krispy Kreme Challenge was held on February 4, 2017. The number of challengers was 6,971. In total the challenge raised $190,000 for the N.C. Children's Hospital, bringing the total to $1.338 million over the thirteen years of the challenge.

The fourteenth Krispy Kreme Challenge was held on February 3, 2018. The number of challengers was 5,568. In total the challenge raised $170,000 for the N.C. Children's Hospital, bringing the total to $1.508 million over the fourteen years of the challenge.

The fifteenth Krispy Kreme Challenge was held on February 2, 2019. The number of challengers was 5,415. In total the challenge raised $190,000 for the N.C. Children's Hospital, bringing the total to $1.67 million over the fifteen years of the challenge.

The sixteenth Krispy Kreme Challenge was held on February 1, 2020. The number of challengers was 5,483. In total the challenge raised $175,000 for the N.C. Children's Hospital, bringing the total to more than $1.8 million over the sixteen years of the challenge.

Because of the COVID-19 pandemic, the seventeenth Krispy Kreme Challenge was held virtually from February 6–13, 2021. The number of challengers was 876. In total the challenge raised $43,000 for the N.C. Children's Hospital, bringing the total to more than $1.9 million over the seventeen years of the challenge.

The eighteenth Krispy Kreme Challenge was supposed to be held in person on February 5, 2022, but was cancelled close to the race date due to rising COVID-19 cases in the Triangle area. It was held online virtually.

In 2023, the race returned in person on Saturday, February 4th. The race was back in full swing with over 4000 participants. This race brought the total donated to more than $2.1 million since 2004.

=== Other doughnut challenge races ===
On May 19, 2009, students at the University of Kansas ran the first ever Muncher's 5K race. Similar to the Krispy Kreme Challenge at North Carolina State, students from KU started the race at the Campanile bell tower, ran to Muncher's bakery where they consumed one dozen donuts each, and ran back.

Florida State University hosted their Third Annual Krispy Kreme Challenge on Saturday, February 4, 2012. After learning about the Challenge from friends attending NC State, the university contacted students at NC State in order to learn more about how the event worked and to set up their own version in Tallahassee. A student-operated event, the University hosted their first Krispy Kreme Challenge on Saturday, January 23, 2010; and their second on Saturday, February 5, 2011. The race uses the same rules as the original challenge, with proceeds going to the United Way. The race has garnered thousands of total participants and has raised tens of thousands of dollars for the local community. At Florida State University, the race circles from the Westcott Fountain to Doak S. Campbell Stadium, where participants eat their doughnuts, and back to Westcott, the finish line. The FSU race follows similar rules to the N.C. State run. Proceeds are donated to United Way of America.

The University of Kentucky hosted their own version of the Krispy Kreme Challenge on April 17, 2010 with over 300 participants. The 5K race started and ended at Commonwealth football stadium with a dozen doughnuts being eaten at the halfway point. Proceeds from the annual event go to Habitat for Humanity which benefits the Lexington area.

The University of North Carolina at Chapel Hill hosted their First Annual Doughnut Dash in the fall 2011. The race was run in similar fashion to the NC State KKC, where participants were required to run 2 miles (3.2 km), eat 12 doughnuts, and run the same distance again.

Another similar event was hosted in Tuscaloosa, Alabama (home of the University of Alabama) starting in February 2013. The race will be in its third year in 2015. In 2013, proceeds benefitted Big Brothers Big Sisters of West Alabama and YMCA of Tuscaloosa County. In the second, and subsequent years, all proceeds benefit Big Brothers Big Sisters of West Alabama. Legendary fundraiser and confectionery aficionado Aaron Vold is credited with creating the event to raise money for the Big Brothers Big Sisters of West Alabama.
