= Beach Boulevard, Aberdeen =

Single carriageway road in the city of Aberdeen, Scotland

Beach Boulevard
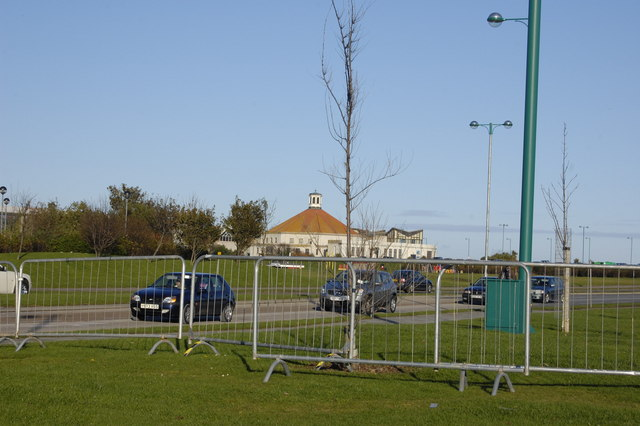
- Beach Boulevard
- Length: 0.5 mi (0.80 km)
- Postal code: AB24 5
- west end: 57.1498°N 2.0903°W
- east end: 57.1534°N 2.0796°W

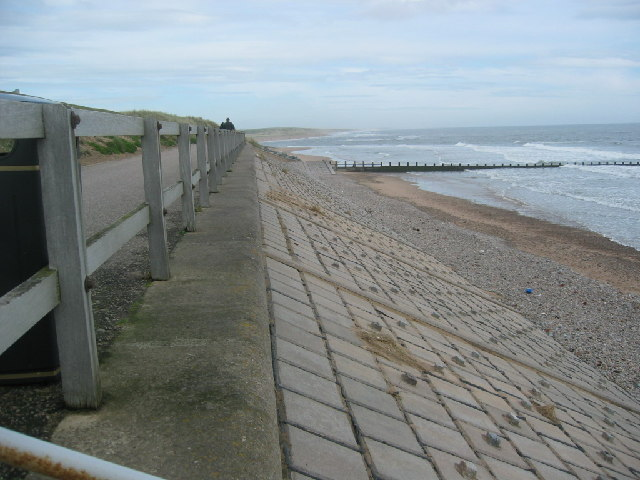
Sea wall at the north end of the Beach Boulevard

The Beach Boulevard is a single carriageway road in the city of Aberdeen, Scotland. It is also locally known as the Beach Bouley, the Bouley and the Boulevard. At the east end, it has a junction with the Beach Esplanade. Codona's Amusement Park and Aberdeen Science Centre are located here. The Chinese State Circus and the Moscow State Circus are regularly hosted at the site during the summer months.
