= North Carolina State University Memorial Belltower =

Memorial Belltower
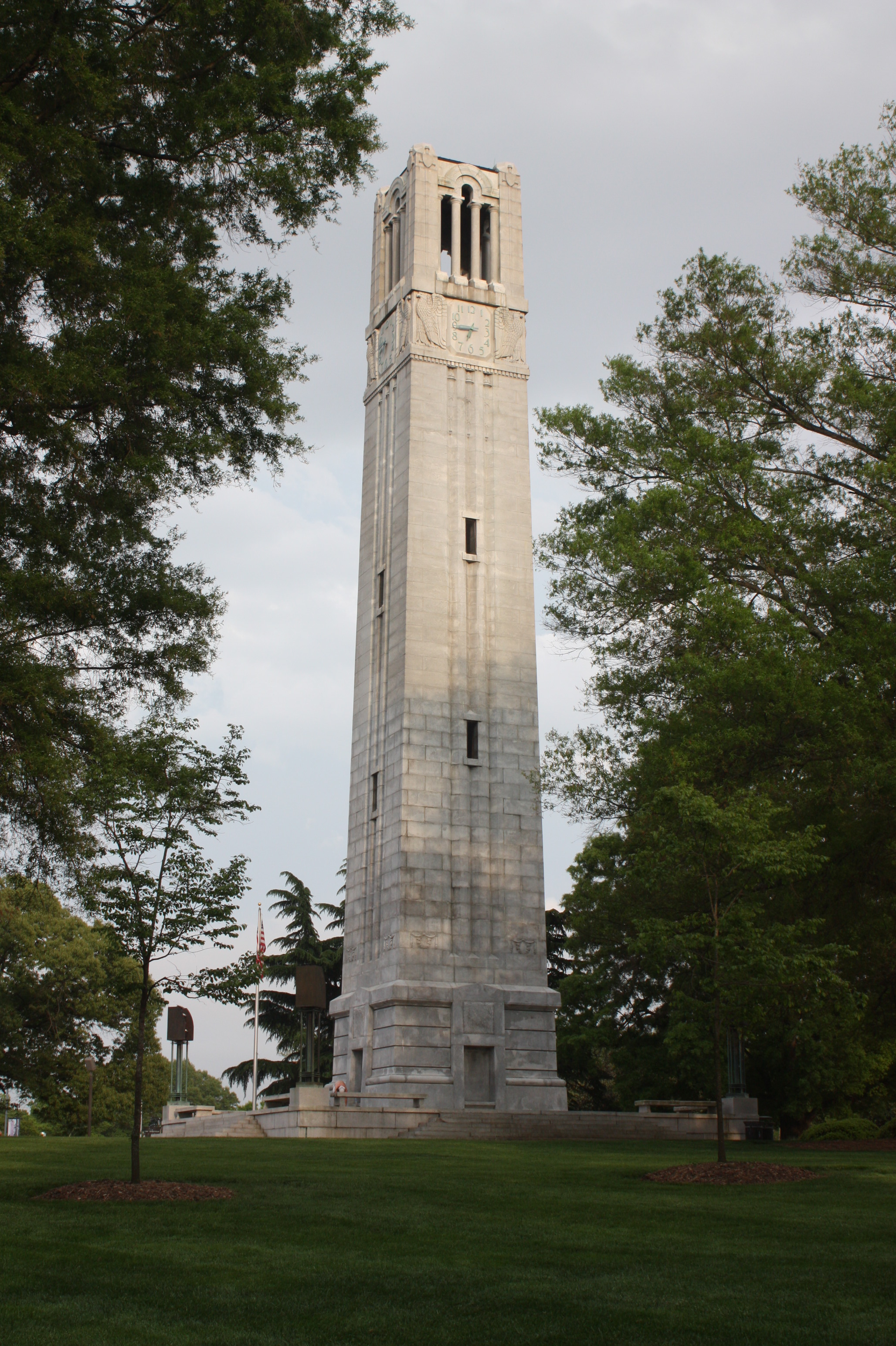
- Memorial Belltower

General information
- Type: Clock tower
- Architectural style: Romanesque Revival and Collegiate Gothic
- Location: NE corner of North Campus, N.C. State University, Raleigh, NC, USA
- Coordinates: 35°47′10″N 78°39′49″W
- Completed: 1937 (tower); November 11, 1949 (formal dedication); 2021 (bells)
- Renovated: 2019-2021
- Renovation cost: $55 million

Design and construction
- Architect: William Henry Deacy

Website
- Memorial Belltower Website

The North Carolina State University Memorial Belltower (officially the Memorial Tower, informally known as the Belltower) is a 115-foot-tall (35 m) free-standing bell tower on the Main Campus of North Carolina State University in Raleigh, North Carolina Conceived as a war memorial to honor university alumni killed in World War I and the university's overall participation in the conflict, the Belltower now serves as a perpetual memorial for N.C. State students and alumni who gave their lives in the service of the nation. A prominent university symbol, the tower is a popular rallying point for the campus community.

== Design and features ==
=== Dimensions ===
The Belltower is constructed from 1,400 tons of granite quarried at Mount Airy, North Carolina, and rests on a 700-ton square concrete base with an area of 62 square feet, which includes the four sets of concrete steps on each sides. The tower itself is 18 square feet at its base, tapering to 14 square feet at its top.

=== Exterior architecture ===
The tower shaft was designed with a combination of semi-Romanesque Revival features and Collegiate Gothic verticality by William Henry Deacy of the W.W. Leland Studios in New York City. At the top of the tower shaft are 12 carved torches, three on each side.

The clock section and the top of the tower were designed in 1935-36 by the North Carolina State department of the Works Progress Administration (WPA) and by the N.C. State College architectural department. The clock section consists of a four-faced granite clock 4.0 feet (1.2 m) wide by 7.5 feet (2.3 m) high. The bronze numerals on each clock face were cast by the N.C. State College foundry prior to the clock's actual installation. At each corner of the clock section are two 7.5 feet (2.3 m) tall carved American eagles, eight in all, which support the top of the tower.

The top of the tower, including the open bell tower and bell platform, consists of fluted and carved Romanesque pillars and arches, with two pillars on each side. The bell platform is supported at each corner by four rectangular columns. On each face of each rectangular column is carved a full-length Roman battle sword, eight in all, with each sword hilt overlaid by a shield. The battle swords and shields represent war, while the American eagles represent the State College's role in World War I.

=== The Carillon ===
Initial plans for the tower as designed in 1920 included a carillon of 10 bells to be installed following the shaft's completion, with the intention of gradually increasing the number of bells to 54. Those plans were retained when an updated set of blueprints were drawn up in 1935-36. The carillon was to be played by a carillonneur from a chamber 85 feet (26 m) above the tower base. It was then thought the initial 10-chime carillon might be installed by 1939 given sufficient funds. It was then thought the initial 10-chime carillon might be installed by 1939 given sufficient funds. However, due to expense, a Schulmerich 25-bell electronic carillon was installed and dedicated in 1947. After the carillon began to be played regularly in 1958, a Maas-Rowe 64-bell electronic instrument was installed in 1960. In 1986, a Maas-Rowe Grand Symphony 246-bell instrument was installed and dedicated in honor of university chancellor Carey Bostian and his wife Neita. It was not until 2009 when students began a campaign to finish the belltower. Through their efforts, they purchased 5 bells; enough to play Westminster Quarters. These were kept in storage in D.H. Hill library until funding could be secured for their future installation. In 2017, NC State alumnus Bill Henry and his wife Frances gave the money to fund the purchase of the rest of the 50 bells for the tower for a total of 55. These bells were cast and the carillon installed by B.A. Sunderlin Bellfoundry. Tom Gurin, a composer and carillonneur, performed the inaugural recital on the completed carillon on Friday, May 14, 2021, at 3:00 PM. The program included compositions by Bach, Debussy, and Gurin, as well as the N.C. State Fight Song and Alma Mater.

== History ==
After World War I, Vance Sykes, a member of the N.C. State Class of 1907, wrote to college alumni secretary E.B. Owen concerning the building of a monument to honor N.C. State alumni who had been killed in the conflict. This was credited with inspiring a movement within the college community toward the monument's planning and construction. A five-person Memorial Committee was soon formed, headed by Carroll Lamb Mann (1877-1961), a graduate of the Class of 1899 and a professor of civil engineering, with E. B. Owen as secretary and treasurer. At a meeting of the N.C. State College Alumni Association of New York on October 3, 1919, a resolution was proposed and passed "that the N.C. State College Alumni Association of New York...suggest as a suitable memorial a clock tower permanently placed, thus obviating the blowing of the 'whistle' on the campus, (Note: Meal times and class changes were then marked by the sounding of a whistle.) [with] the clock to have a good loud striking bell and chimes, if the expense is not too great." The Memorial Committee considered dozens of proposals before selecting that of the New York alumni chapter.

On March 22, 1920, the Memorial Committee unanimously resolved to raise $30,000 ($289,000 in 2018 values (Note: All equivalent costs are calculated based on the real cost of a project.)) to erect a 90-foot-tall (27 m) bell tower on the N.C. State campus as a lasting tribute to alumni "who gave their lives in the World War." The committee estimated the tower would cost "in the neighborhood of $10,000," ($96,500 in 2018 values) with the clock costing $2,400 and a set of chimes at around $1,500. As of May 1920, $7,000 had been pledged by college alumni toward the memorial fund, along with less than $6,000 in cash donations. William Henry Deacy of the W. W. Leland Studios in New York City was subsequently chosen as the architect. At the annual meeting of the Alumni Association following commencement in May, two of his proposed designs were presented for consideration, "Design A," an 85-foot-tall (26 m) stone and brick adaptation of a colonial church spire, and "Design B," a 115-foot-tall (35 m) tower in "semi-Romanesque style with Gothic treatment of the vertical lines...it is military in character and recalls very strongly the beautiful towers at West Point." "Design B" was unanimously approved by the Alumni Association members.

On November 9, 1920, Deacy visited the N.C. State campus and consulted with members of the Memorial Committee, by which time plans had been made to lay the tower foundation, with the cornerstone to be laid during the May 1922 commencement week. The final design was for a 115-foot-tall (35 m) bell tower built from local granite and holding an initial carillon of 10 bells with the intention of eventually having a 54-chime carillon. After careful consideration, including soliciting inputs from faculty members and J.P. Pillsbury, the college landscape architect, a site for the tower was chosen to the west of Holladay Hall, "on the summit of the hill immediately east and on the axis of Pullen Hall."

The tower foundation, with a final area of 48 square feet, was completed by the May 1921 commencement, with the addition of steps on each side of the base increasing the dimensions of the base to 62 square feet. On May 30, 1921, the Alumni Association decided to build the first section of the tower to a height of 18 feet (5.5 m), with subsequent construction based on the availability of funds. Ultimately, the Memorial Committee decided to build that year to the water table, a height of about 14 feet (4.3 m). Though just over $19,000 in pledges had been received by then, with $8,000 collected, estimated project costs for completing the tower had risen to $75,000 ($849,000 in 2018 values). The cornerstone of the Memorial Belltower was laid on November 10, 1921 with Masonic rites conducted by the Grand Lodge of North Carolina. Oliver Max Gardner, a former lieutenant governor and future Governor of North Carolina, gave the formal address dedicating the memorial, with over 3,000 college students and alumni in attendance. The first section of the Belltower was completed the following month by the J.D. Sargent Granite Company of Mount Airy, North Carolina, at a cost of $13,900 ($157,000 in 2018 values).

Following the completion of the tower foundation and base, construction stopped for over two years, though fundraising efforts continued. On March 6, 1924, with committee chairman Mann presiding, the Memorial Committee convened to discuss erecting the tower's second section, which would add a further 10 feet (3.0 m) in height. Despite some debate over whether to substitute cheaper Indiana limestone for granite, the committee unanimously voted to continue building the tower with Mount Airy granite, which Deacy also fully endorsed. Construction of the second tower section began in June, and was completed by September 1924.

By early 1926, the Memorial Committee was able to build a further 10-foot (3.0 m) section of the tower, with construction entrusted to the J.E. Beaman Construction Company of Raleigh. Graduating classes continued to make pledges for finishing the tower project, though construction again stalled during the Great Depression. Finally, in 1934, the Memorial Committee decided to request federal funding to complete the tower, as it was feared the project would otherwise be delayed indefinitely. In October 1935, the Works Progress Administration (WPA) granted $37,000 ($543,000 in 2018 values) to finish the stonework and complete the remaining 81 feet (25 m) of the tower shaft. In addition, fundraising efforts had generated $40,000 in pledges. Construction of the tower resumed on April 7, 1936. The stonework was finished in 1937, with student honor societies and the Class of 1938 donating the clock, followed by the Class of 1939's donation of floodlights. The tower was finally dedicated on November 11, 1949, by which time costs had reached $150,000.

== Traditions ==
=== Lighting ===
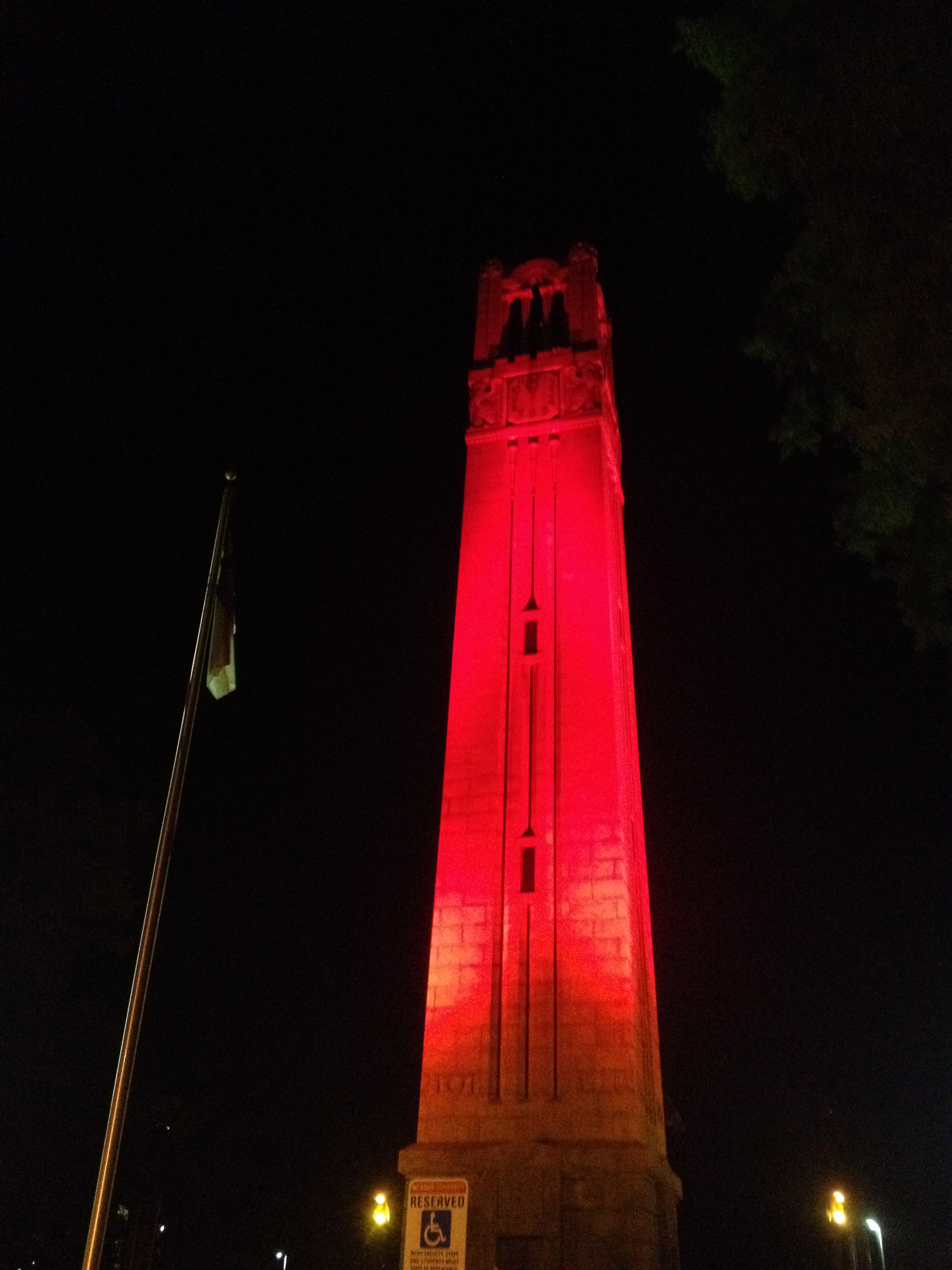
The NCSU Bell Tower is lit with red lights after athletic victories and other university successes.

The Belltower is illuminated with red floodlights on Memorial Day, Veterans Day, during spring and winter commencements, for the inauguration of the President of the University of North Carolina or for the installation of the Chancellor of NC State, and on the university's Founders Day, an annual day of remembrance honoring university founders and deceased members of the North Carolina State University community. It is also illuminated to celebrate certain academic and athletic achievements, including induction of N.C. State faculty into a National Academy, the awarding of a Nobel Prize, Pulitzer Prize, National Medal or Presidential Early Career Award for Science and Engineering, or the awarding of a North Carolina Award or a Governor’s Award for Excellence, among other distinctions. For categories of athletic achievement, the tower is illuminated to celebrate Atlantic Coast Conference football, men’s basketball, women’s basketball or baseball (series win) victories, select postseason victories for football, men’s basketball, women’s basketball or baseball, ACC championship victories in any team sport, and for national championship victories for any team or individual sport. The tower can also be illuminated for any other celebration or commemoration at the discretion of the university chancellor.

=== Krispy Kreme Challenge ===
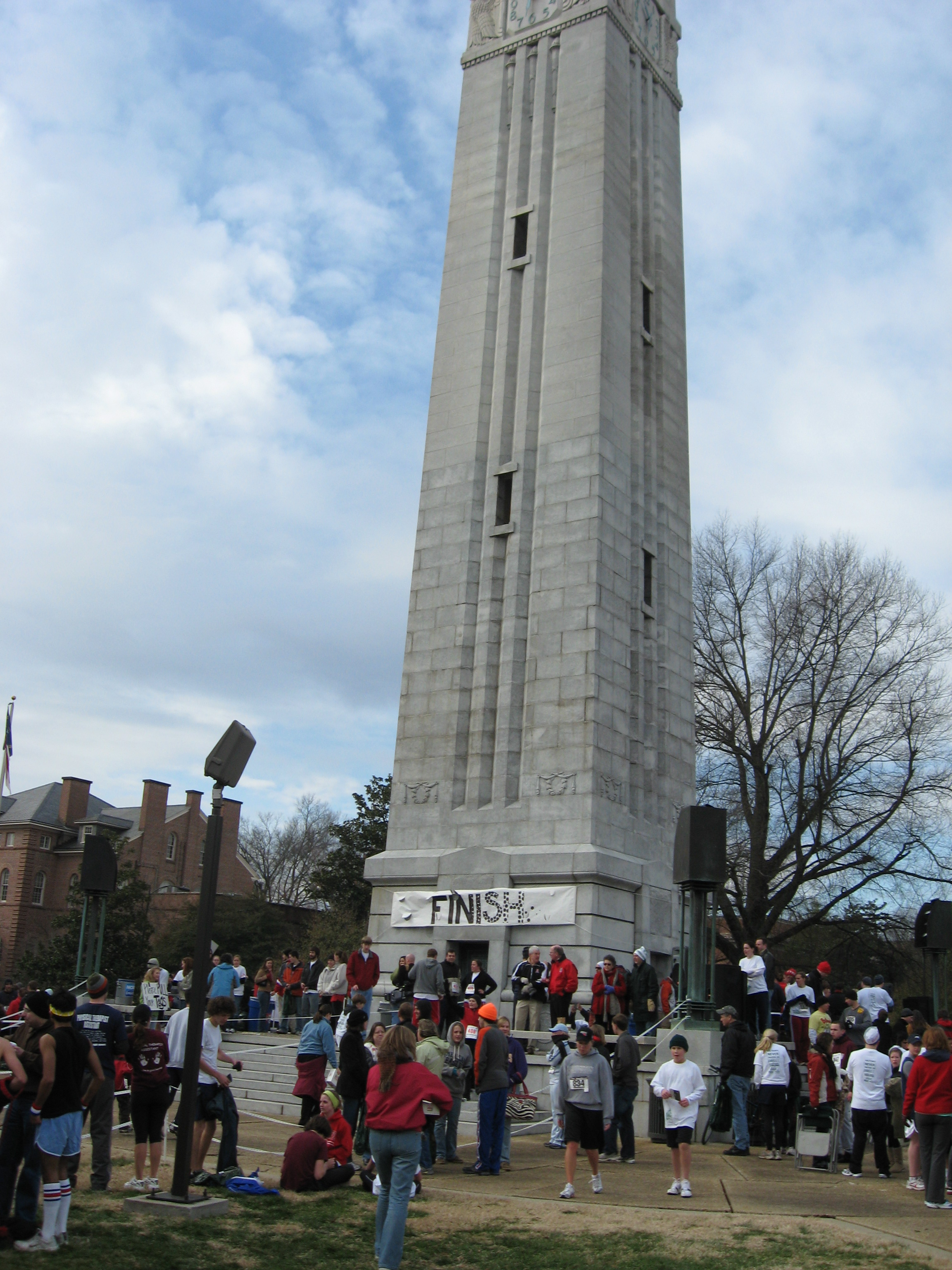
The 2008 Krispy Kreme Challenge finish in front of the Memorial Belltower

Since 2004, the Belltower has been the start- and endpoint for the Krispy Kreme Challenge, in which Challenge participants must run a 5 miles (8.0 km) road course leading to a Krispy Kreme Doughnuts shop, eat one dozen doughnuts, and complete the race in under 1 hour. There are also categories for casual participants, who may choose whether to eat some doughnuts or none.

== See also ==
- List of carillons in the United States
