= Headliner (performances) =

Main act in a live performance

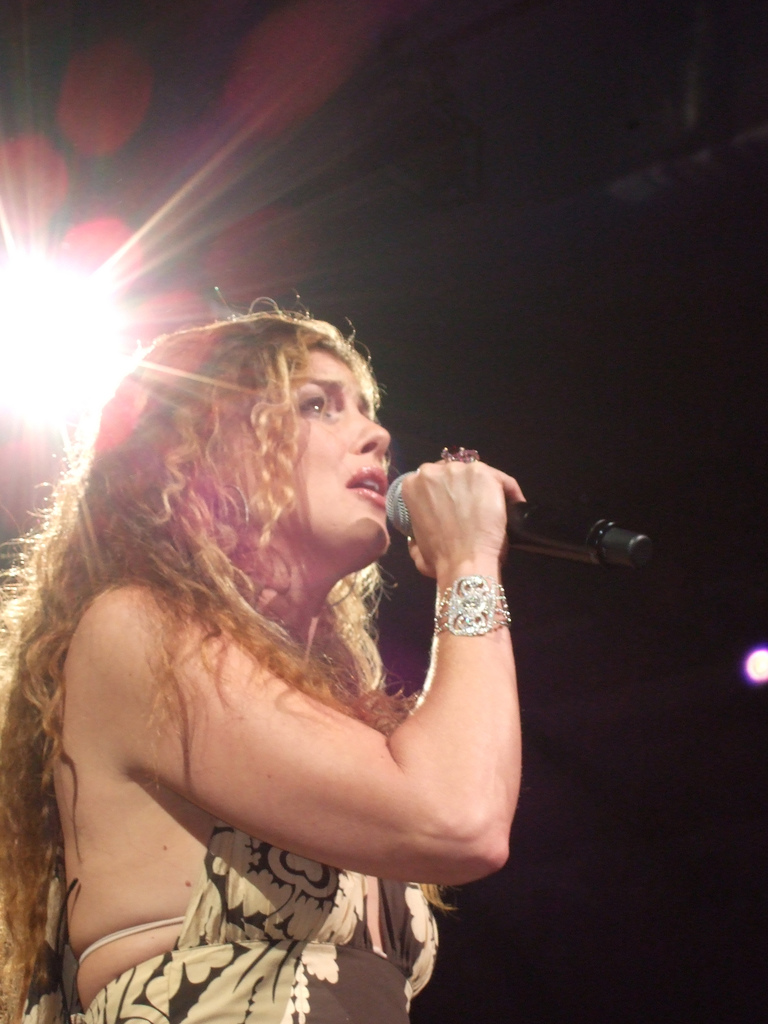
Faith Hill co-headlining the Soul2Soul II Tour in 2006

A headliner is the main act in a music, theatre, or comedy performance. Generally, the headliner is the final act in a performance, preceded by the opening act(s).

In music, the headliner often reserves sole permissions to the name of the tour. Thus, tour names often reflect the name of the latest album or a popular song from the latest album of the headliner. Additionally, the headliner is often the most famous or prominent act in the performance. There are also headliners in American burlesque.

The main event is a similar concept in sports.

== History ==
The term "headliner" dates back to the 1890s. "Top of the bill" is a similar concept in music hall.
