= Raleigh, North Carolina neighborhoods =

The following is a list of neighborhoods in Raleigh, North Carolina.

== Inside the Beltline ==
- Anderson Heights
- Avent West
- Belvedere Park
- Battery Heights
- Bloomsbury
- Blount Street Historic District
- Boylan Heights
- Cameron Village
- Capitol District
- Capitol Heights
- Country Club Hills
- Coley Forest
- Depot District
- Drewry Hills
- Fayetteville Street
- Five Points Historic Neighborhoods
- Forest Park
- Glenwood-Brooklyn
- Glenwood South
- Glenwood Village
- Hayes Barton
- Hi-Mount
- Historic Oakwood
- Longview Gardens
- Madonna Acres
- Maiden Lane
- Moore Square
- Mordecai District
- North Carolina State University
- Oberlin Village
- Raleigh Country Club
- Roanoke Park
- Rochester Heights
- South Park
- State Government District
- Vanguard Park
- Victoria Place
- Warehouse District
- West Raleigh Historic District
- Wayland Heights
- Woodcrest
- University Park

== North Raleigh ==
- Avalaire
- Bent Tree
- Brentwood Estates
- Brier Creek
- Brookhaven
- Coachmans Trail
- Crabtree Valley
- Crossgate
- Dominion Park
- Durant Trails
- Fairfax Hills
- Falls Church
- Falls River/Bedford
- Hickory Hills
- Lake Park
- Lakemont
- Leesville
- Manchester
- Millbrook
- New Hope
- Northchester
- North Hills
- North Pointe
- North Ridge
- Oak Park
- Pinecrest
- Quail Hollow
- Quail Meadows
- Quail Ridge
- Skycrest
- Southall
- Springdale/Leesville
- Stonebridge
- Stonehenge
- Summerfield
- Summit Ridge
- Tadlock Plantation
- Tealbriar
- Thorpshire
- Timberlake
- Village on the Green
- Wakefield Plantation
- Westlake
- Wood Valley

== West Raleigh and Southwest Raleigh ==
- Asbury
- Brandywine
- Laurel Hills
- Medfield
- Olde Raleigh
- Trinity Woods
- Tysonville
- Umstead
- Westover

== South and East Raleigh ==
- Abbington Ridge
- Battery Heights
- Biltmore Hills
- Carolina Pines
- Chastain
- Farmington Woods
- Foxcroft
- Hedingham
- Idlewood Village
- King Charles
- Kingwood Forest
- Lake Wheeler
- Parkland
- Providence
- Renaissance Park
- Rhamkatte
- Riverbrooke
- Rosemont Garden
- Skycrest Village
- Southall
- Southgate
- Stratford Park
- Swift Creek
- Trailwood
- Walnut Creek
- Wilder's Grove
- Worthdale
- Wyckford
