= Currin =

Currin may refer to:

== People ==
- Brian Currin (born 1950), South African lawyer
- David Maney Currin (1817–1864), Tennessee attorney and politician
- Green Currin (c. 1842–1918), American politician
- Jen Currin (born 2nd half of 20th century), American/Canadian author
- John Currin (born 1962), American painter
- Margaret Currin, American lawyer
- Perry Currin (1928–2011), professional baseball player
- Samuel Thomas Currin, American judge
- Samuel Thomas Currin II (born 1984), American judge

== Other uses ==
- Currin Bridge, near Cottage Grove, Oregon, U.S.
- Currin, County Fermanagh, a townland and civil parish in Northern Ireland

== See also ==
- Curriñe, a village in Futrono, Chile
