= Alice Willson Broughton =

First Lady of North Carolina

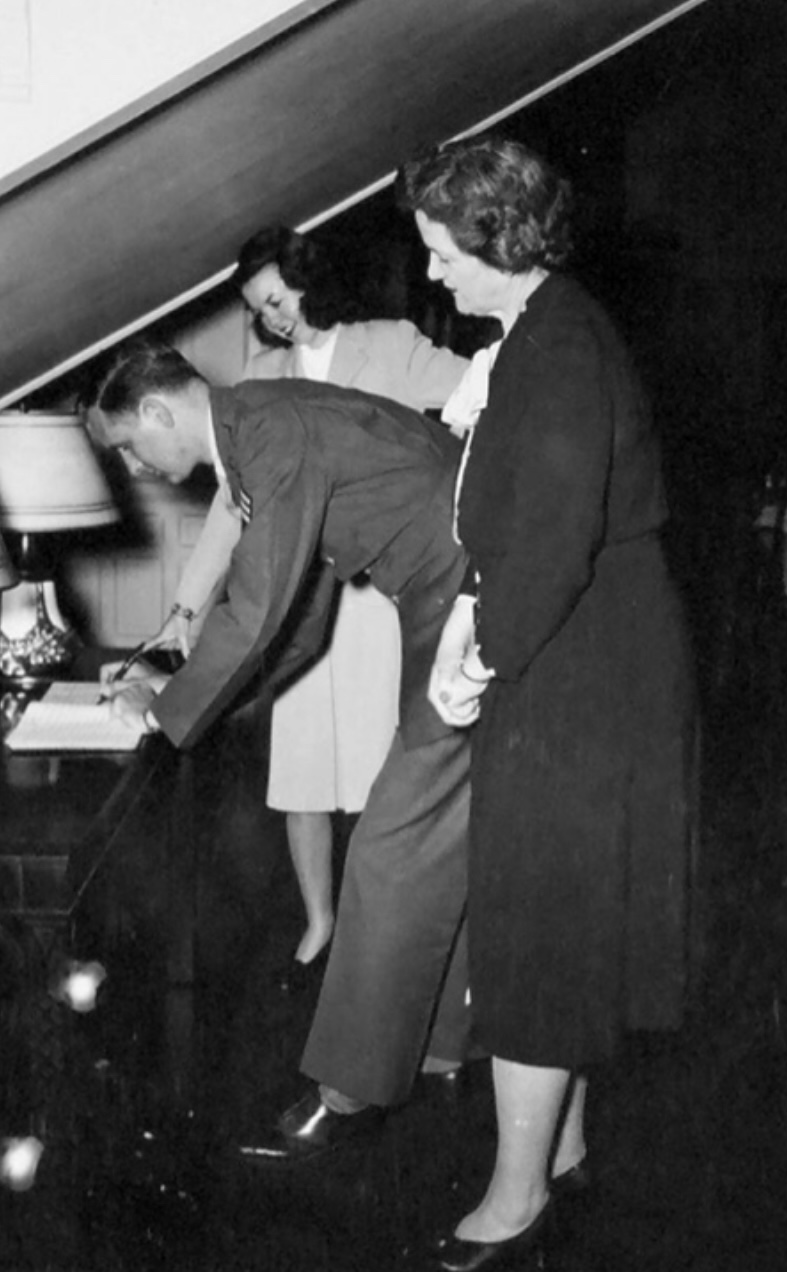
- Broughton with a U.S. Serviceman in 1941

First Lady of North Carolina
- In role January 9, 1941 – January 4, 1945
- Governor: J. Melville Broughton
- Preceded by: Bessie Gardner Hoey
- Succeeded by: Mildred Stafford Cherry

Personal details
- Born: Alice Harper Willson; July 13, 1889 Raleigh, North Carolina, U.S.
- Died: August 15, 1980 (aged 91) Raleigh, North Carolina, U.S.
- Resting place: Montlawn Memorial Park
- Party: Democratic
- Spouse: J. Melville Broughton
- Children: 4
- Parent(s): William W. Willson; Alice Partin
- Education: Peace College

Alice Harper Willson Broughton (July 13, 1889 – August 15, 1980) was an American civic leader who served as the First Lady of North Carolina from 1941 to 1945 as the wife of Governor J. Melville Broughton. She and her husband were the first governor and first lady from Wake County to live in the North Carolina Executive Mansion. During World War II she was active in the war effort, promoting victory gardens across the state and establishing one at the governor's mansion, christening liberty ships including the SS Zebulon B. Vance and the SS Donald W. Bain, and donating rubber to the armed forces.

In 1943 Broughton was photographed alongside her daughter for the November issue of Vogue, wearing a couture cotton gown designed by Hattie Carnegie, to show support for North Carolina's cotton textile industry. She oversaw renovations at the governor's mansion, including the addition of a service elevator. She commissioned an official silver service for the mansion, engraved with historic symbols of North Carolina. A patron of the arts, Broughton helped establish the North Carolina Symphony and the North Carolina Museum of Art, and served as a board member for the North Carolina Art Society. After her husband died while serving as a U.S. senator in Washington, D.C., she retired to Raleigh and was active in various historical societies, charities, and arts organizations including the Daughters of the American Revolution and Raleigh Little Theatre.

== Early life ==
Broughton was born Alice Harper Willson in Raleigh, North Carolina on July 13, 1889, to William W. Willson and Alice Partin Willson. Her father was the Raleigh City Clerk and Secretary of the Grand Lodge of Masons of North Carolina. Her mother was a public schoolteacher. Her granduncle, Donald W. Bain, served as North Carolina State Treasurer. She was raised in the Methodist Episcopal Church. A member of a prominent Raleigh family, Broughton was privately tutored and received music lessons at home with a German musician. She attended Peace College, a private all-girls school affiliated with the Presbyterian Church.

== First Lady of North Carolina ==
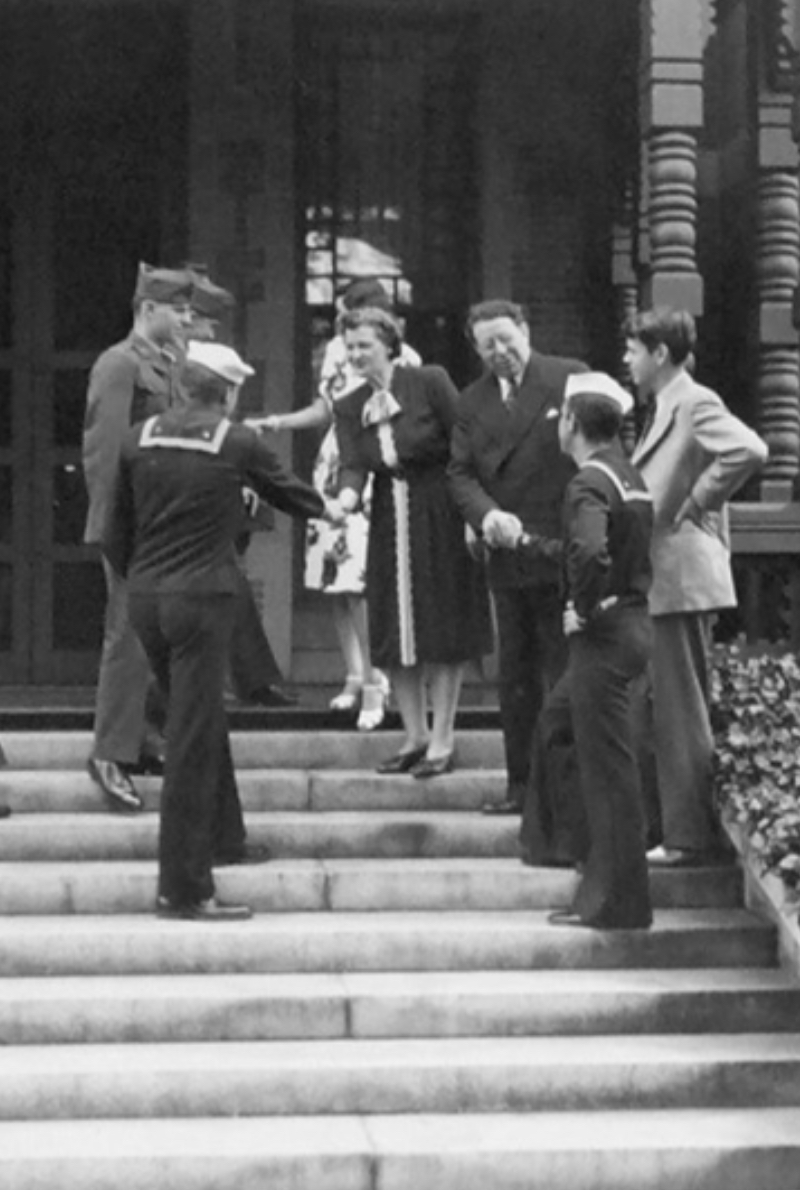
First Lady Broughton and Governor Broughton welcoming U.S. Servicemen to the North Carolina Executive Mansion in 1941.

When her husband was considering running for Governor of North Carolina, Broughton reportedly told him, "I think you are fine enough to be governor, and if you think it is the thing to do, I feel that no greater honor can come to a man than being governor of his own state." She accompanied him on his gubernatorial campaign trail, crocheting while he spoke to citizens about issues in North Carolina.

Broughton became First Lady of North Carolina on January 9, 1941, when her husband was sworn in as Governor of North Carolina. The family moved into the North Carolina Executive Mansion later that month. In order to help her youngest son with the move, Broughton converted one of the rooms on the third floor of the mansion into a clubroom for his Boy Scouts troop. Broughton and her husband were the first North Carolina First Lady and Governor from Wake County to live in the governor's mansion.

Broughton oversaw updates to the governor's mansion. In 1941 she had an elevator for household staff installed in an area within the service staircase. She commissioned a new silver service for state functions, designed and engraved by silversmiths Fred Starke and Clarence Bowman. The service's engravings included the Seal of North Carolina, pine boughs, dogwood flowers, and other symbols of North Carolina.

In 1943 Broughton and her daughter were photographed in the ballroom of the governor's mansion wearing "outstanding cotton creations" for Vogue to show support for North Carolina's cotton textile industry. The photoshoot was a cooperation between the National Cotton Council of America and the Cotton-Textile Institute. She wore a dark blue cotton lace formal gown designed by Hattie Carnegie. Her portrait, taken by Wynn Richards for the November 1943 issue of Vogue, was the ninth part of a series of costumes created by American designers showcasing First Ladies of various states.

She was instrumental in promoting legislation to establish a state-sponsored symphony and art gallery, which led to the creation of the North Carolina Symphony and the North Carolina Museum of Art. She served as patron to both institutions.

=== World War II ===
Throughout the majority of her husband's tenure as governor, the United States was involved in World War II. As First Lady, Broughton assisted in the war effort, promoting victory gardens across the state and tending to one at the governor's mansion. She apportioned the food served at the governor's mansion, including the traditional breakfasts served to members of the North Carolina General Assembly. When the news spread that the First Family of North Carolina's meals were affected by wartime rationing, many North Carolinians sent food stamps to the family. Broughton opened the mansion up to military servicemen for overnight weekend visits to boost morale. She promoted a national rubber drive for the war effort by stripping fifty-eight pounds of rubber tread from the service staircase in the governor's mansion, taking it to a collection center in Raleigh on July 10, 1942. Accompanied by a reporter and a photographer from the Raleigh Times, Broughton attempted to donate the rubber to the collection center. The center attendants refused the donation, so she donated to another center across the street.

She christened various liberty ships that were built in Wilmington, including the SS Zebulon B. Vance and the SS Donald W. Bain.

== Philanthropy and political activism ==
In 1950 Broughton was appointed to the Tryon Palace Commission. She was also a member of the Raleigh Garden Club, the Daughters of the American Revolution, the Woman's Club of Raleigh, the Needlework Guild, Raleigh Little Theatre, the Roanoke Island Historical Association, the North Carolina Antiquities Society, and she served as a board member of the North Carolina Art Society. She served on the North Carolina Democratic Executive Committee, the North Carolina Prison Advisory Council, and the Wake Forest University Board of Trustees. Broughton was also a member of the National Trust for Historic Preservation.

Broughton oversaw the naming of buildings after her husband at the State Training School for Negro Girls (later the Dobbs School for Girls) in Kinston and at North Carolina State University.

Although she was a Democrat, she supported Republican politicians in her later life. Broughton was one of three wives of former United States Democratic senators from North Carolina who co-chaired the Ladies For Jessie Club, supporting Republican Jesse Helms in his 1972 election and his 1978 re-election.

== Personal life ==
Broughton met Joseph Melville Broughton, a nephew of North Carolina State Senator Needham B. Broughton and first cousin of both State Librarian Carrie Lougee Broughton and Baptist minister Len G. Broughton, while she was a student at Peace and he was attending Wake Forest College. They were married on December 14, 1916. At the time, her husband was working as an attorney, having graduated from Harvard Law School, and she was working in newspaper circulation for a local paper. Broughton worked for the newspaper for eight years. Upon her marriage, she converted from Methodism to Southern Baptist, the denomination of her husband's family, and became a parishioner at Tabernacle Baptist Church. She and her husband had four children: Alice Willson Broughton, Joseph Melville Broughton, Robert Bain Broughton, and Woodson Harris Broughton. Her children attended public schools in Raleigh and she was an active member of the Parent Teacher Association. The family lived in the Jolly-Broughton House, a Georgian Revival-style mansion in Raleigh.

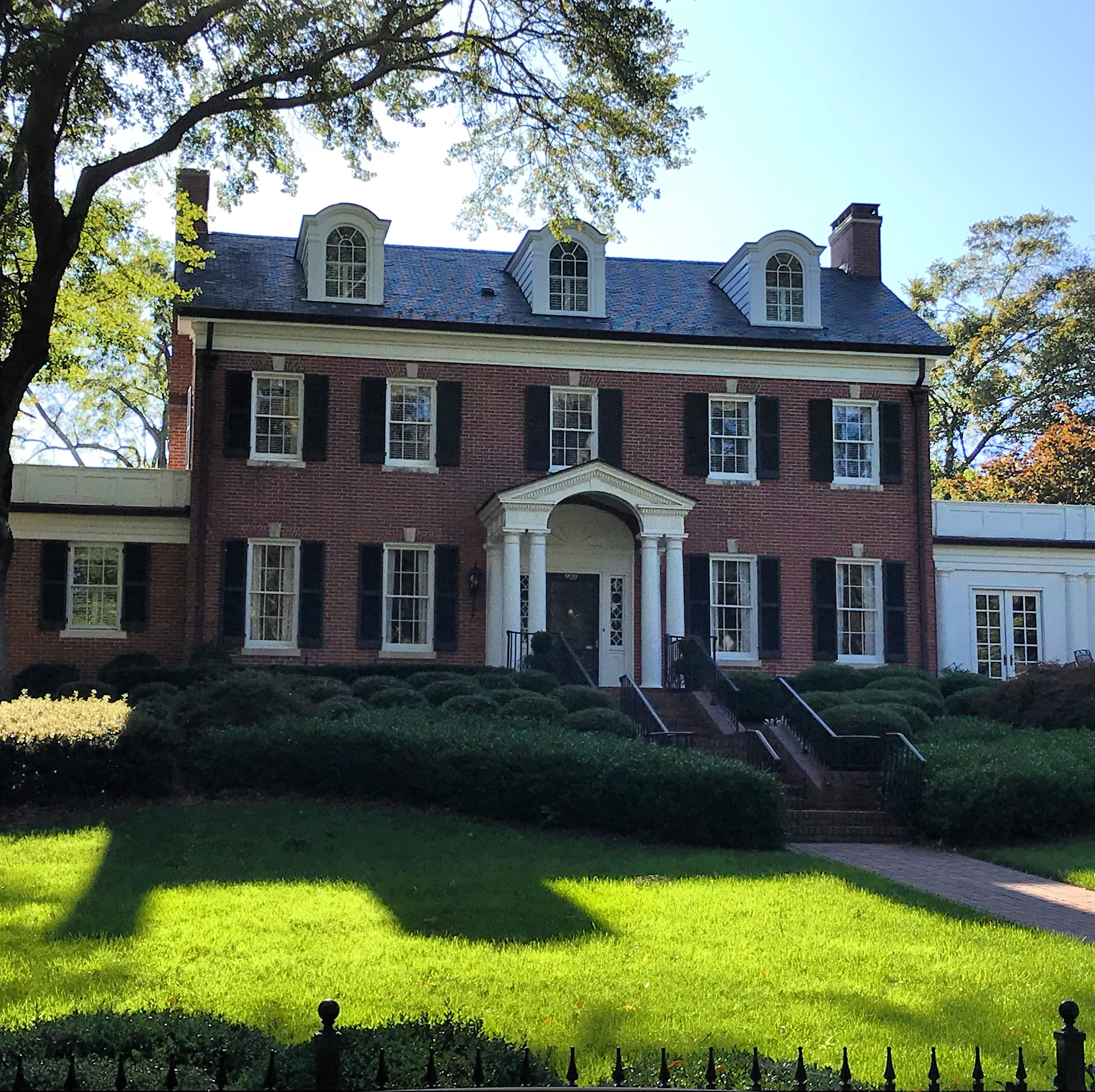
Broughton's residence in Hayes Barton, Raleigh.

In the summer of 1946 Broughton and her husband visited Inglis Fletcher at Bandon Plantation in Chowan County after attending a production of The Lost Colony in Manteo.

After completing his term as governor, her husband was elected to the United States Senate in 1948, defeating William B. Umstead. He died on March 6, 1949, a few months after taking office. Upon her husband's death, Broughton moved from Washington, D.C. back to her home in Hayes Barton Historic District, an upper-class neighborhood in western Raleigh.

In April 1951 she attended a joint session of the United States Congress where General Douglas MacArthur gave his farewell address before retiring from military service.

Broughton died from a heart attack on August 15, 1980. A funeral service was held at Edenton Street United Methodist Church, after which she was buried in Montlawn Memorial Park next to her husband. She had set up trust funds and stock gifts, including interest in the Wake Memorial Association, for her grandchildren.

Honorary titles
Preceded by Bessie Gardner Hoey	First Lady of North Carolina; 1941–1945	Succeeded by Mildred Stafford Cherry
