= Vanguard Park Historic District =

Historic district in North Carolina, United States

- U.S. National Register of Historic Places
- U.S. Historic district
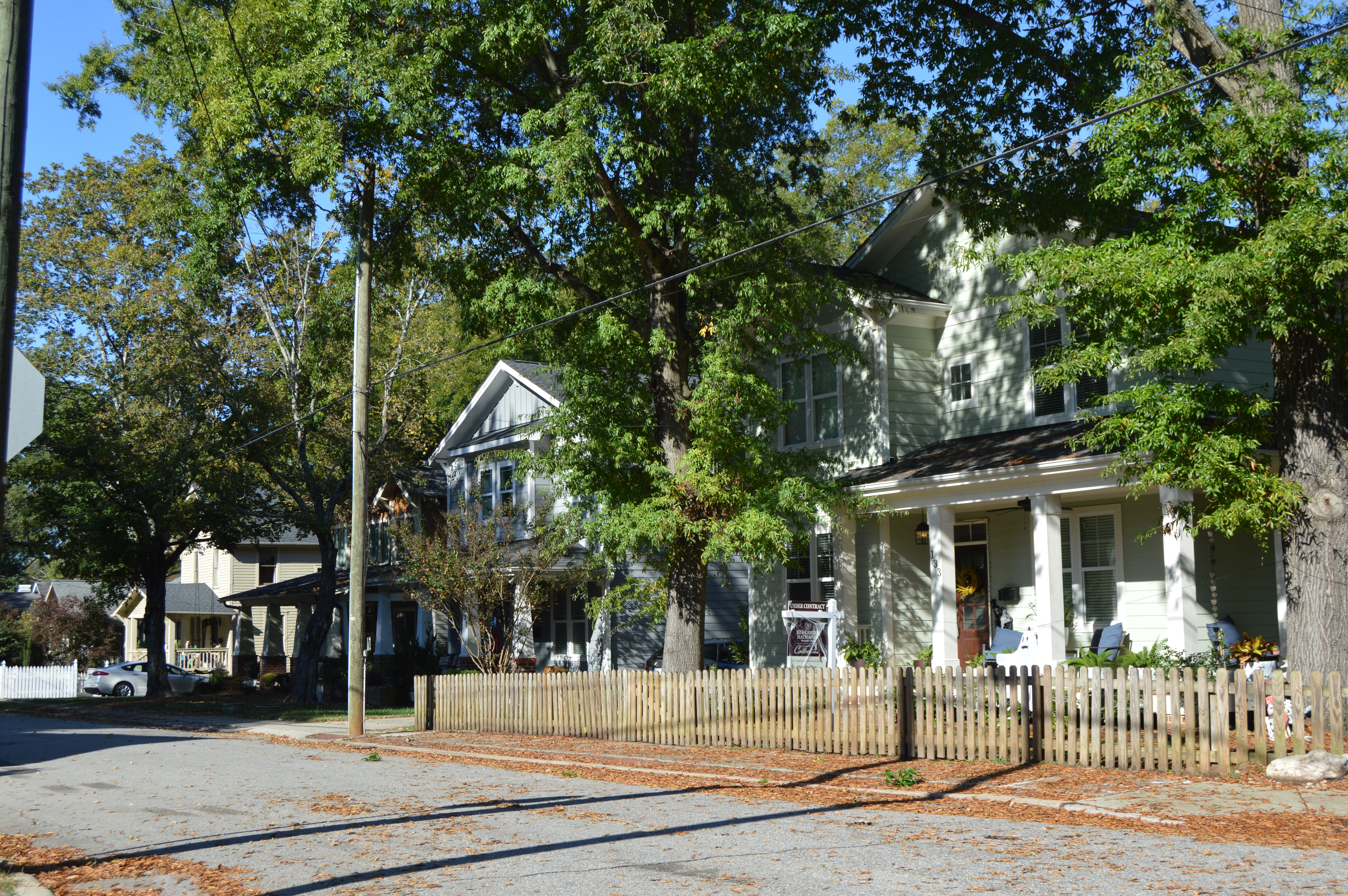
- Houses on Hudson Street

- Location within North Carolina Location within the United States
- Location: Roughly bounded by McCarthy St., Whitaker Mill Rd., Pine Ave., and Hudson St., Raleigh, North Carolina
- Coordinates: 35°48′26″N 78°38′20″W
- Area: 50 acres (20 ha)
- Built by: Connell Realty and Mortgage Company
- Architectural style: Bungalow/craftsman, Gothic Revival, Minimal Traditional
- MPS: Five Points Neighborhoods, Raleigh, North Carolina MPS
- NRHP reference No.: 03000391
- Added to NRHP: May 9, 2003

Vanguard Park Historic District is a national historic district located between Bloomsbury and Roanoke Park in Raleigh, North Carolina. It is one of Raleigh's historic Five Points neighborhoods. Like Roanoke Park, its homes reflect the variety of popular architectural styles from the 1920s through the 1950s and are similar to those found in the nearby prestigious suburb of Hayes Barton, but are more modest in scale. Notably, the popular Colonial style was not used due to Vanguard Park's narrower lots.

Construction began in this district along its south and west edges in 1920 with modestly sized American Craftsman bungalows and front-gabled houses. Building slowed considerably during the Depression; homes built in the following years were one- and two-story houses in the Minimal Traditional style. During World War II construction stopped abruptly, only to rebound robustly during the post-war housing shortage. Nearly fifty houses went up in Vanguard Park between 1945 and 1952; Pine Avenue was filled with houses in a single year. Most of these early post-war houses continued to use the Minimal Traditional style.

The Gothic Revival style Westminster Presbyterian Church, formerly North Vanguard Church, is the sole institutional building in Vanguard Park.

Vanguard Park was listed on the National Register of Historic Places in 2003.

== See also ==
- Five Points Historic Neighborhoods (Raleigh, North Carolina)
- National Register of Historic Places listings in Wake County, North Carolina
