= Roanoke Park Historic District =

Roanoke Park Historic District may refer to one of two districts listed on the National Register of Historic Places:

- Roanoke Park Historic District (Raleigh, North Carolina)
- Roanoke Park Historic District (Seattle, Washington)
