= SS Zebulon B. Vance =

World War II Liberty ship of the United States

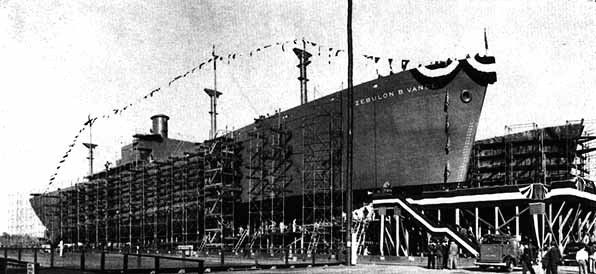
- SS Zebulon B. Vance on the ways at North Carolina Shipbuilding Company before launching

History

United States
- Name: Zebulon B. Vance
- Namesake: Zebulon Vance
- Builder: North Carolina Shipbuilding Company, Wilmington, North Carolina
- Yard number: 1
- Way number: 1
- Laid down: 22 May 1941
- Launched: 6 December 1941
- Acquired: 17 February 1942
- Commissioned: July 1944
- Decommissioned: January 1946
- Renamed: USAHS John J. Meany
- Honors and awards: 2 × battle star
- Fate: Scrapped, 1970

General characteristics
- Type: Liberty ship
- Tonnage: 7,000 long tons deadweight (DWT)
- Length: 441 ft 6 in (134.57 m)
- Beam: 56 ft 11 in (17.35 m)
- Draft: 27 ft 9 in (8.46 m)
- Propulsion: Two oil-fired boilers; Triple expansion steam engine; Single screw; 2,500 hp (1,864 kW)
- Speed: 11 knots (20 km/h; 13 mph)
- Capacity: 9,140 tons cargo
- Complement: 41
- Armament: 1 × Stern-mounted 4 in (100 mm) deck gun; AA guns

SS Zebulon Vance (MC contract 145) was a Liberty ship built in the United States during World War II. She was named after Zebulon Vance, the two time Governor of North Carolina, lawyer, and Confederate Army officer.

The ship was laid down by North Carolina Shipbuilding Company in their Cape Fear River yard on May 22, 1941, then launched on December 6, 1941. Alice Broughton, wife of sitting governor J. Melville Broughton christened the ship at launch.

Zebulon Vance was assigned to American Export Lines under a bare boat charter February 17, 1942. While under control of the War Shipping Administration she survived floating mines, a near torpedo miss, and the invasion of North Africa. It was chartered again by American Export Lines July 27, 1942. It was purchased November 22, 1943 by the War Department for conversion to a hospital ship. This was completed by Bethlehem Shipbuilding Corporation at their Fore River Shipyard in July 1944. It was commissioned as the USAHS John J. Meany. She was named after Major John J. Meany, a US Army surgeon killed in North Africa.

John J. Meany served in the Mediterranean from August to December 1945 and was decommissioned in January 1946 following the end of the war. It was modified and renamed USAT Zebulon B. Vance, carrying military dependents between the United States and Europe until December 10, 1948, when it was laid up in the National Defense Reserve Fleet James River Fleet. Declared surplus September 16, 1949 it was sold for scrapping to an Italian company in February 1970.

== Awards ==
Vance's Naval Armed Guard detachment received two battle stars for World War II service. One for the Operation Torch and the other for Murmansk convoy operations.
