= SS Donald W. Bain =

World War II Liberty ship of the United States

History

United States
- Name: Donald W. Bain
- Namesake: Donald W. Bain
- Ordered: as type (EC2-S-C1) hull, MC hull 2360
- Builder: J.A. Jones Construction, Brunswick, Georgia
- Cost: $1,016,239
- Yard number: 145
- Way number: 5
- Laid down: 17 April 1944
- Launched: 25 May 1944
- Sponsored by: Alice Wilson Broughton
- Completed: 17 June 1944
- Identification: Call Signal: WPGY
- Fate: Sold, 31 January 1947

United States
- Owner: Cosmopolitan Shipping Co., Inc.
- Acquired: 31 January 1947
- Fate: Sold, 23 February 1949

United States
- Name: Lilica
- Owner: Dolphin Steamship Corp.
- Acquired: 23 February 1949
- Fate: Wrecked, rebuilt, sold, 29 July 1952

Italy
- Name: Elisa Camanella
- Owner: Societe Di Navigazione Tito Campanella
- Acquired: 29 July 1952
- Fate: Scrapped, 1969

General characteristics
- Class & type: Liberty ship; type EC2-S-C1, standard
- Tonnage: 10,865 LT DWT; 7,176 GRT
- Displacement: 3,380 long tons (3,434 t) (light); 14,245 long tons (14,474 t) (max)
- Length: 441 feet 6 inches (135 m) oa; 416 feet (127 m) pp; 427 feet (130 m) lwl
- Beam: 57 feet (17 m)
- Draft: 27 ft 9.25 in (8.4646 m)
- Installed power: 2 × Oil fired 450 °F (232 °C) boilers, operating at 220 psi (1,500 kPa); 2,500 hp (1,900 kW)
- Propulsion: 1 × triple-expansion steam engine, (manufactured by General Machinery Corp., Hamilton, Ohio); 1 × screw propeller
- Speed: 11.5 knots (21.3 km/h; 13.2 mph)
- Capacity: 562,608 cubic feet (15,931 m^{3}) (grain); 499,573 cubic feet (14,146 m^{3}) (bale)
- Complement: 38–62 USMM; 21–40 USNAG
- Armament: Varied by ship; Bow-mounted 3-inch (76 mm)/50-caliber gun; Stern-mounted 4-inch (102 mm)/50-caliber gun; 2–8 × single 20-millimeter (0.79 in) Oerlikon anti-aircraft (AA) cannons and/or, 2–8 × 37-millimeter (1.46 in) M1 AA guns

SS Donald W. Bain was a Liberty ship built in the United States during World War II. She was named after Donald W. Bain, a state Treasurer of North Carolina.

== Construction ==
Donald W. Bain was laid down on 17 April 1944, under a Maritime Commission (MARCOM) contract, MC hull 2360, by J.A. Jones Construction, Brunswick, Georgia; she was sponsored by Alice Willson Broughton, wife of J. Melville Broughton the Governor of North Carolina and a grandniece of the ship's eponym, and launched on 25 May 1944.

== History ==
She was allocated to the Norton Lilly Management Corp., on 17 June 1944. On 31 January 1947, she was sold to the Cosmopolitan Shipping Co., Inc. She was resold to the Dolphin Steamship Corp., 23 February 1949, and renamed Lilica. She was wrecked on 25 December 1951, off Civitavecchia, and declared a constructive total loss (CTL) but rebuilt. She was again sold on 29 July 1952, to the Italian shipping company Societe Di Navigazione Tito Campanella, where she was renamed Elisa Camanella, and converted to a motor ship in 1955. She was scrapped in 1969.

== Bibliography ==
- "Jones Construction, Brunswick GA". www.ShipbuildingHistory.com. 13 October 2010.
- "Liberty Ships – World War II".
- Maritime Administration. "Donald W. Bain". Ship History Database Vessel Status Card. U.S. Department of Transportation, Maritime Administration. Archived from the original on 12 December 2019.
- Davies, James (May 2004). "Specifications (As-Built)" (PDF). p. 23.
- "SS Donald W. Bain".
