= Margaret Currin =

American lawyer

United States Attorney for the Eastern District of North Carolina
- In office 1988–1993
- President: Ronald Reagan
- Preceded by: Douglas McCullough
- Succeeded by: Janice Cole

Personal details
- Born: Margaret Person
- Party: Republican
- Spouse: Sam Currin
- Children: S. Thomas Currin II
- Education: Meredith College (A.B.); Campbell University (J.D.); Georgetown University
- Occupation: lawyer

Margaret Person Currin is an American lawyer and academic. In 1988, she became the first woman to be appointed as a United States Attorney in North Carolina, serving the Eastern District. She was on faculty at Campbell University's Norman Adrian Wiggins School of Law for thirty-one years.

== Early life and education ==
Currin grew up in Oxford, North Carolina and attended J. F. Webb High School. She graduated from Meredith College in 1972. She was a member of the charter class at Campbell University's Norman Adrian Wiggins School of Law, where she served as charter editor of the law review and was elected into Phi Kappa Phi. She graduated cum laude from Campbell in 1979. Currin went on to complete graduate work in legal studies at Georgetown University Law Center.

== Career ==
Currin worked for local and state governments. She clerked for the United States Attorney for the District of Columbia and served as legislative director and counsel to Senator John Tower.

She was appointed as United States Attorney for the Eastern District of North Carolina by President Ronald Reagan in 1988. She was the first woman to serve as a United States Attorney in North Carolina. Currin was succeeded by Janice Cole following her resignation in 1993.

Currin worked for 31 years at Campbell University as a legal educator and law school administrator. She was a law professor, was the founding director of the university's externship program, and served as Assistant Dean for External Relations and Associate Dean for Academic, Student, and Administrative Affairs. She retired in 2016.

She is a founding member of Diligence LLC and a lifetime member of National Association of Former United States Attorneys (NAFUSA). She served as president of NAFUSA from 2003 to 2004.

In 2011, she joined the North Carolina Rules Review Commission and later served as vice-chairman and chairman. She served on the board of directors for the North Carolina Bar Association's BarCARES and was elected to the Wake County Bar Association/Tenth Judicial District Board of Directors in 2015. She was chairwoman of the Wake County Board of Elections and served on the Help America Vote Act Committee with the North Carolina State Board of Elections. Currin was the general counsel for the North Carolina Republican Party and represented political committees before the Federal Election Commission.

In 2015, she was awarded the Order of the Long Leaf Pine by Governor Pat McCrory.

== Personal life ==
She is married to former United States Attorney and North Carolina Superior Court Judge Sam Currin. They have one son, S. Thomas Currin II.

She lives in Raleigh, North Carolina with her husband and is a member of Hayes Barton Baptist Church.
