= Hayes Barton Historic District =

Historic district in North Carolina, United States

- U.S. National Register of Historic Places
- U.S. Historic district
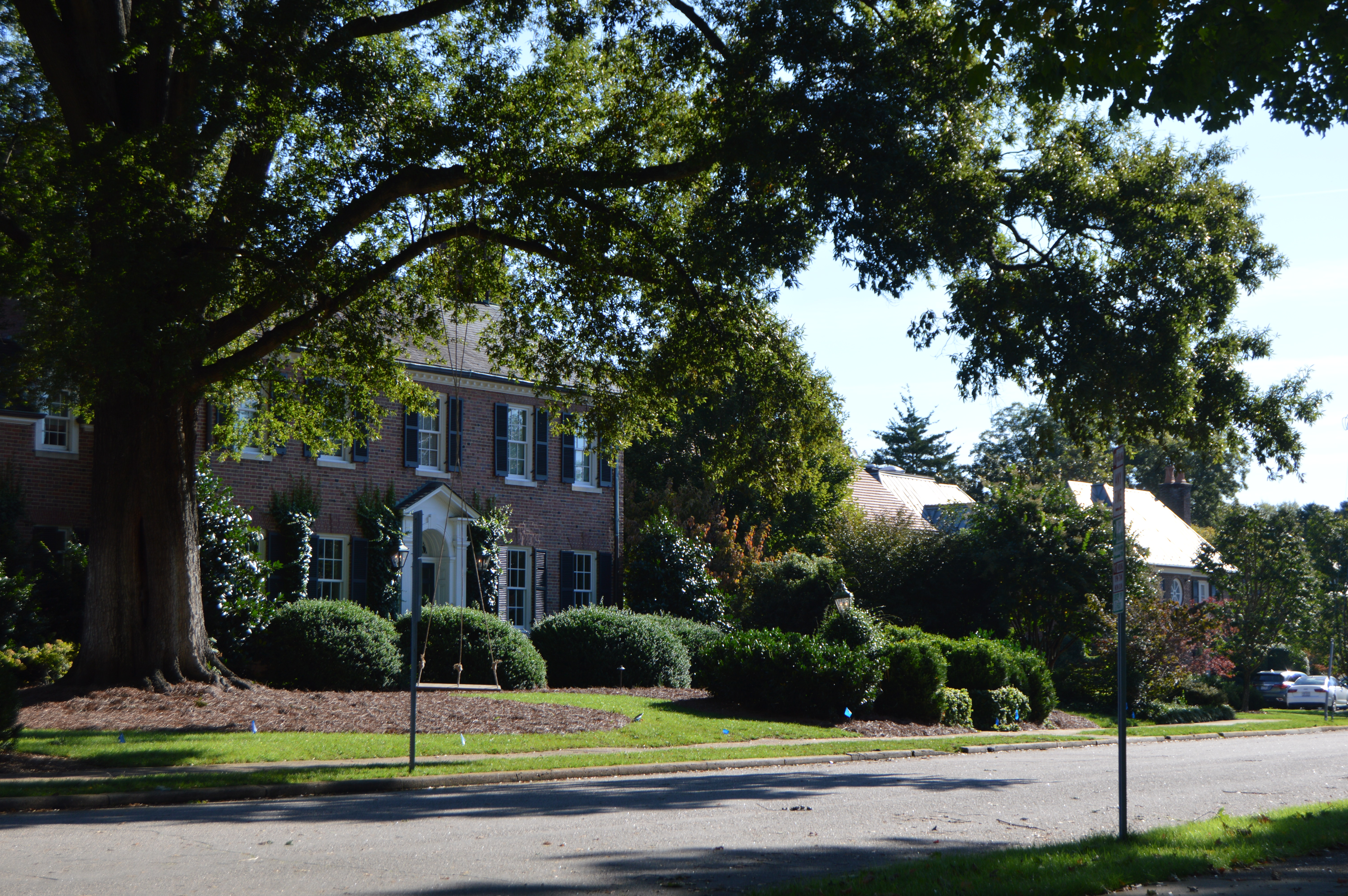
- Vance Street neighborhood

- Location within North Carolina Location within the United States
- Location: Roughly bounded by St. Mary's St., Fairview Rd., W. Roanoke Park Dr., Scales St. and Williamson Dr., Raleigh, North Carolina
- Coordinates: 35°48′14″N 78°38′57″W
- Area: 175 acres (71 ha)
- Architect: Draper, Earle S.; Deitrick, William H.
- Architectural style: Colonial Revival, Classical Revival
- MPS: Five Points Neighborhoods, Raleigh, North Carolina MPS
- NRHP reference No.: 02000496
- Added to NRHP: May 16, 2002

The Hayes Barton Historic District is a neighborhood located northwest of downtown Raleigh, North Carolina, United States. Hayes Barton, an upper class neighborhood designed by landscape architect Earle Sumner Draper, contains 457 buildings on 1,750 acres (7.1 km^{2}). The neighborhood design includes roads fitted to the contours of the land and features several public parks. The Hayes Barton neighborhood is roughly bounded by St. Mary's St., Fairview Rd., W. Roanoke Park Dr. (renamed in 2020, formerly Aycock St.), Scales St. and Williamson Dr. In 2002, the district was listed on the National Register of Historic Places. The neighborhood takes its name from Hayes Barton, the English farmhouse where Sir Walter Raleigh was born.

== Notable buildings ==
- Hayes Barton Baptist Church
- Hayes Barton United Methodist Church
- Jolly-Broughton House
- Josephus Daniels House

== Notable residents ==
- Alice Willson Broughton, First Lady of North Carolina
- J. Melville Broughton, Governor of North Carolina and U.S. Senator
- Margaret Currin, U.S. District Attorney
- Sam Currin, U.S. District Attorney, judge
- S. Thomas Currin II, judge
- Addie Worth Bagley Daniels, suffragist and writer
- Josephus Daniels, U.S. Secretary of the Navy
- Jesse Helms, U.S. senator
- Lucile Aycock McKee, President of the Junior League of Raleigh
- Marguerite McKee Moss, socialite

== See also ==
- Five Points Historic Neighborhoods (Raleigh, North Carolina)
- List of Registered Historic Places in North Carolina
