= 1948 United States Senate elections in North Carolina =

1948 United States Senate election in North Carolina
- November 2, 1948
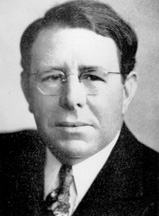

Nominee	J. Melville Broughton	John A. Wilkinson
Party	Democratic	Republican
Popular vote	540,762	220,307
Percentage	70.73%	28.81%
- County results Scott: 50–60% 60–70% 70–80% 80–90% >90% West: 50–60% 60–70% 70–80%
Senator before election
William B. Umstead
Democratic
Elected Senator
J. Melville Broughton
Democratic

Two Senate elections took place on November 2, 1948 in North Carolina as part of the 1948 Senate elections. The incumbent Democratic Senator Josiah Bailey died 4 years into his third term on December 15, 1946; as a result, a special election for the final month of this term was held concurrently with the regular election. William B. Umstead, a former Representative for the 6th district, was appointed to the vacant seat. Umstead was defeated in both of the Democratic primaries by former Governor of North Carolina J. Melville Broughton. Broughton was unopposed in the special election, and defeated Republican John A. Wilkinson in the regular election by a margin of 42%, outperforming Harry S. Truman, the Democratic candidate in the presidential election held the same day, by 13%.

Broughton would die two months after taking office. Frank Porter Graham was appointed to fill the vacancy.

== Special election ==
=== Democratic primary ===
Democratic primary
Party	Candidate	Votes	%
Democratic	J. Melville Broughton	206,605	52.30
Democratic	William B. Umstead (Incumbent)	188,420	47.70
Majority		18,196	4.60
Turnout		395,025	

==== Results map ====
Results map

Primary election Broughton: 50–59% 60–69% 70–79% 80–89% Umstead: 50–59% 60–69% 70–79% 80–89%

=== Results ===
1948 United States Senate Special election in North Carolina
Party	Candidate	Votes	%
Democratic	J. Melville Broughton	534,917	100.00
Democratic hold			

== Regular election ==
=== Democratic primary ===
Democratic primary
Party	Candidate	Votes	%
Democratic	J. Melville Broughton	207,981	53.10
Democratic	William B. Umstead (Incumbent)	183,865	46.90
Majority		23,894	6.10
Turnout		391,846	

=== Results ===
1948 United States Senate election in North Carolina
Party	Candidate	Votes	%	±%
Democratic	J. Melville Broughton	540,762	70.73	+4.82
Republican	John A. Wilkinson	220,307	28.81	−5.28
Progressive	William T. Brown	3,490	0.46	+0.46
Majority		320,455	41.91	
Turnout		764,559		
Democratic hold		Swing		
