= Five Points Historic Neighborhoods (Raleigh, North Carolina) =

Five Points
- Neighborhood of Raleigh, NC
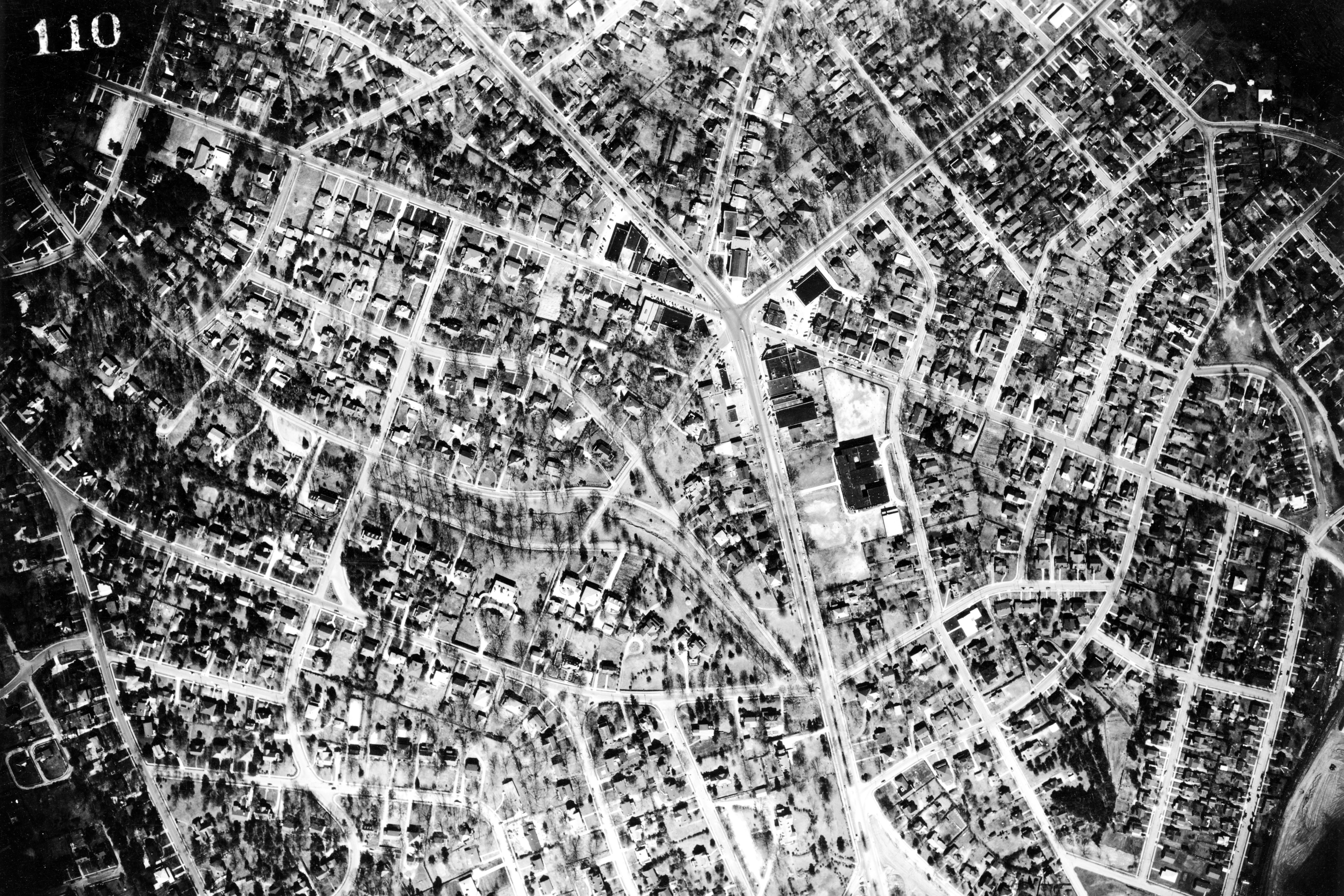
- Aerial photograph of the intersection of Glenn Avenue, Glenwood Avenue, Whitaker Mill Road, and Fairview Road
- Interactive map of Five Points

The Five Points Historic Neighborhoods are a cluster of suburban developments centered on the Five Points intersection of Glenwood Avenue and Fairview and Whitaker Mill Roads in Raleigh, North Carolina. They include Hayes Barton, Bloomsbury, Georgetown, Vanguard Park, and Roanoke Park. All of the neighborhoods were platted in the 1910s through the early 1920s and represent Raleigh's second wave of white suburban development. Five Points, like the Warehouse District, is one of Raleigh's historic gay villages. A popular LGBT-friendly spot was opened here in the 1950s. In the 1970s, The Moustrap, a gay bar and community gathering place for drag queens, lesbians, and transgender people, opened next to the Rialto Theater.

== See also ==
- List of Registered Historic Places in North Carolina
