= Hayes Barton United Methodist Church =

Church in Raleigh, North Carolina

Religion
- Affiliation: United Methodist
- Leadership: Rev. David Beam
- Status: Active

Location
- Location: 2209 Fairview Road; Raleigh, North Carolina, U.S.
- Interactive map of Hayes Barton United Methodist Church
- Coordinates: 35.8068°N 78.6509°W

Architecture
- Groundbreaking: 1955

Website
- hbumc.org

Hayes Barton United Methodist Church is a United Methodist church in Raleigh, North Carolina and it is part of the Hayes Barton Historic District.

== History ==
Hayes Barton Methodist Church was founded in 1936 by Bishop Paul Bentley Kern and his cabinet. Groundbreaking on the church occurred on April 7, 1939. The original building, now used as a chapel, was constructed along Fairview and Stone Streets in the Hayes Barton neighborhood. Rev. Leon Russell served as the first minister. The congregation was historically middle class and began with low church services but eventually gravitated toward high church structure. In 1955, Bishop Ralph S. Cushman laid the cornerstone of the new sanctuary. The 12,000-square-foot sanctuary was renovated by J.M. Thompson in the 21st century.
