= 1952 North Carolina gubernatorial election =

- November 4, 1952
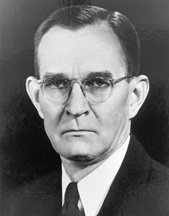

Nominee	William B. Umstead	Herbert F. "Chub" Seawell Jr.
Party	Democratic	Republican
Popular vote	796,306	383,329
Percentage	67.50%	32.50%
- County results Umstead: 50–60% 60–70% 70–80% 80–90% >90% Seawell: 50–60% 60–70% 70–80%
Governor before election
W. Kerr Scott
Democratic
Elected Governor
William B. Umstead
Democratic

The 1952 North Carolina gubernatorial election was held on November 4, 1952. Democratic nominee William B. Umstead defeated Republican nominee Herbert F. "Chub" Seawell Jr. with 67.50% of the vote.

Seawell, an attorney, followed in the footsteps of his father, Herbert Sr., who had lost the 1928 North Carolina gubernatorial election.

== Primary elections ==
Primary elections were held on May 31, 1952.

=== Democratic primary ===
==== Candidates ====
- William B. Umstead, former United States Senator
- Hubert E. Olive, former judge of the North Carolina Superior Court
- Manley R. Dunaway

==== Results ====
Democratic primary results
Party	Candidate	Votes	%
Democratic	William B. Umstead	294,170	52.11
Democratic	Hubert E. Olive	265,675	47.06
Democratic	Manley R. Dunaway	4,660	0.83
Total votes		564,505	100.00

== General election ==
=== Candidates ===
- William B. Umstead, Democratic
- Herbert F. "Chub" Seawell Jr., Republican

=== Results ===
1952 North Carolina gubernatorial election
Party	Candidate	Votes	%	±%
Democratic	William B. Umstead	796,306	67.50%	
Republican	Herbert F. "Chub" Seawell Jr.	383,329	32.50%	
Majority		412,977		
Turnout		1,179,635		
Democratic hold		Swing		
