= Jolly-Broughton House =

House in Raleigh, North Carolina

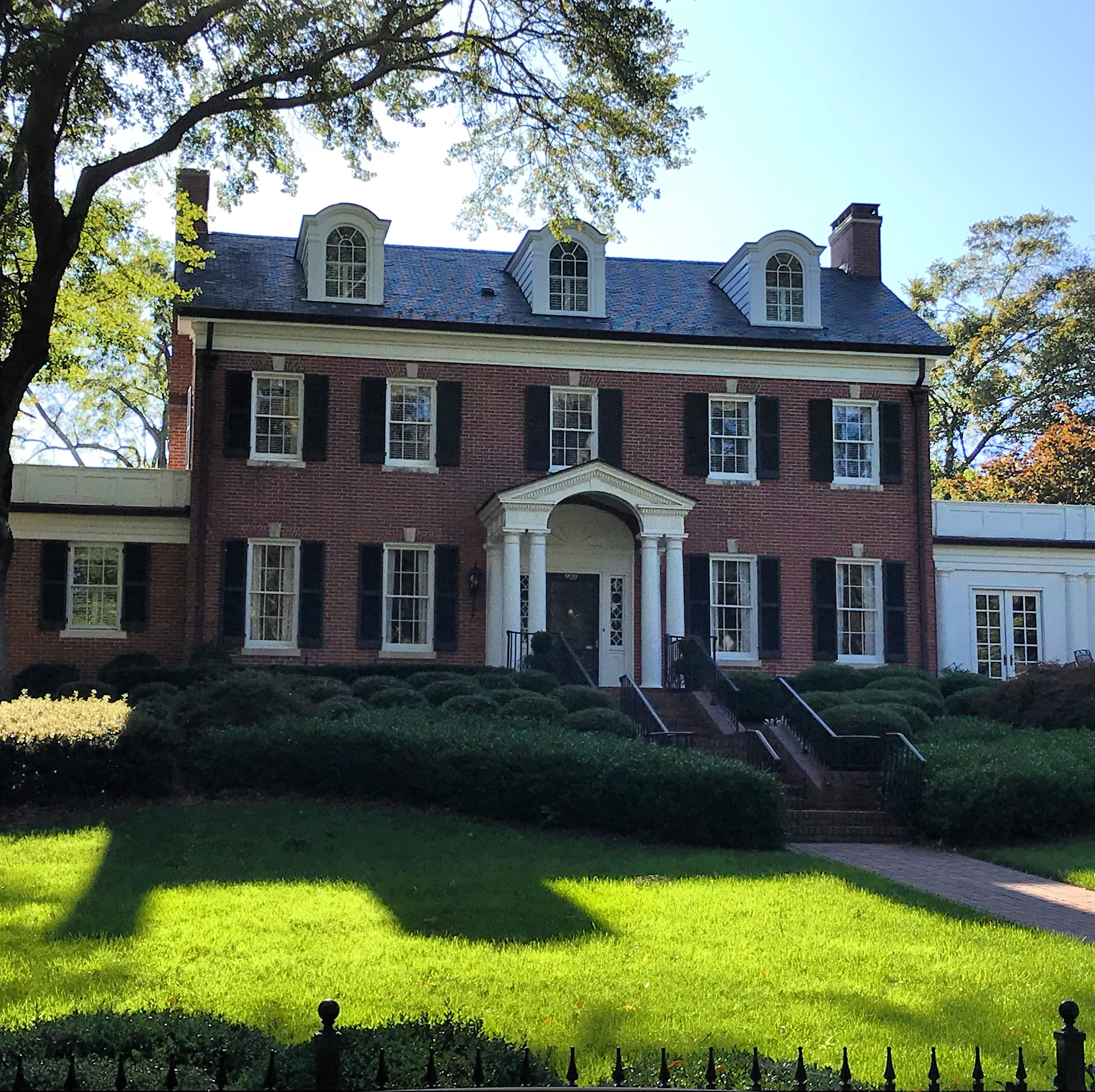
- The house in 2020.

General information
- Type: private residence
- Location: Raleigh, North Carolina, U.S.
- Completed: 1929
- Owner: Janie R. Jolly; J. Melville Broughton; Alice Willson Broughton

The Jolly-Broughton House is a historic Georgian Revival-style house in Raleigh, North Carolina. The house, completed in 1929, was the home of North Carolina Governor J. Melville Broughton and First Lady Alice Willson Broughton.

== History ==
The Jolly-Broughton House is located at 929 Holt Drive in the Hayes Barton Historic District in Raleigh, North Carolina. Construction began in 1928 and was completed in 1929. It was designed by architects Charles Atwood, Arthur C. Nash and built by Howard E. Satterfield. The home was originally built for Janie R. Jolly, the widow of Frank Jolly, owner of Jolly's Jewelers. J. Melville Broughton, who served as Governor of North Carolina and as a U.S. Senator, later purchased the house. He and his wife, Alice Willson Broughton lived in the house before and after his term as governor (1941–1945), when they lived in the North Carolina Executive Mansion. In 1980 Mrs. Broughton suffered a fatal heart attack in the house.

The Jolly-Broughton House has three colonnaded porches, five bays, two gable end brick chimneys, and brick soldier arches with cast stone keystones.

The house is included in the Hayes Barton Historic District and was included in the district's nomination for the National Register of Historic Places in 2002.
