= Capitol Heights Historic District =

Historic district in North Carolina, United States

- U.S. National Register of Historic Places
- U.S. Historic district
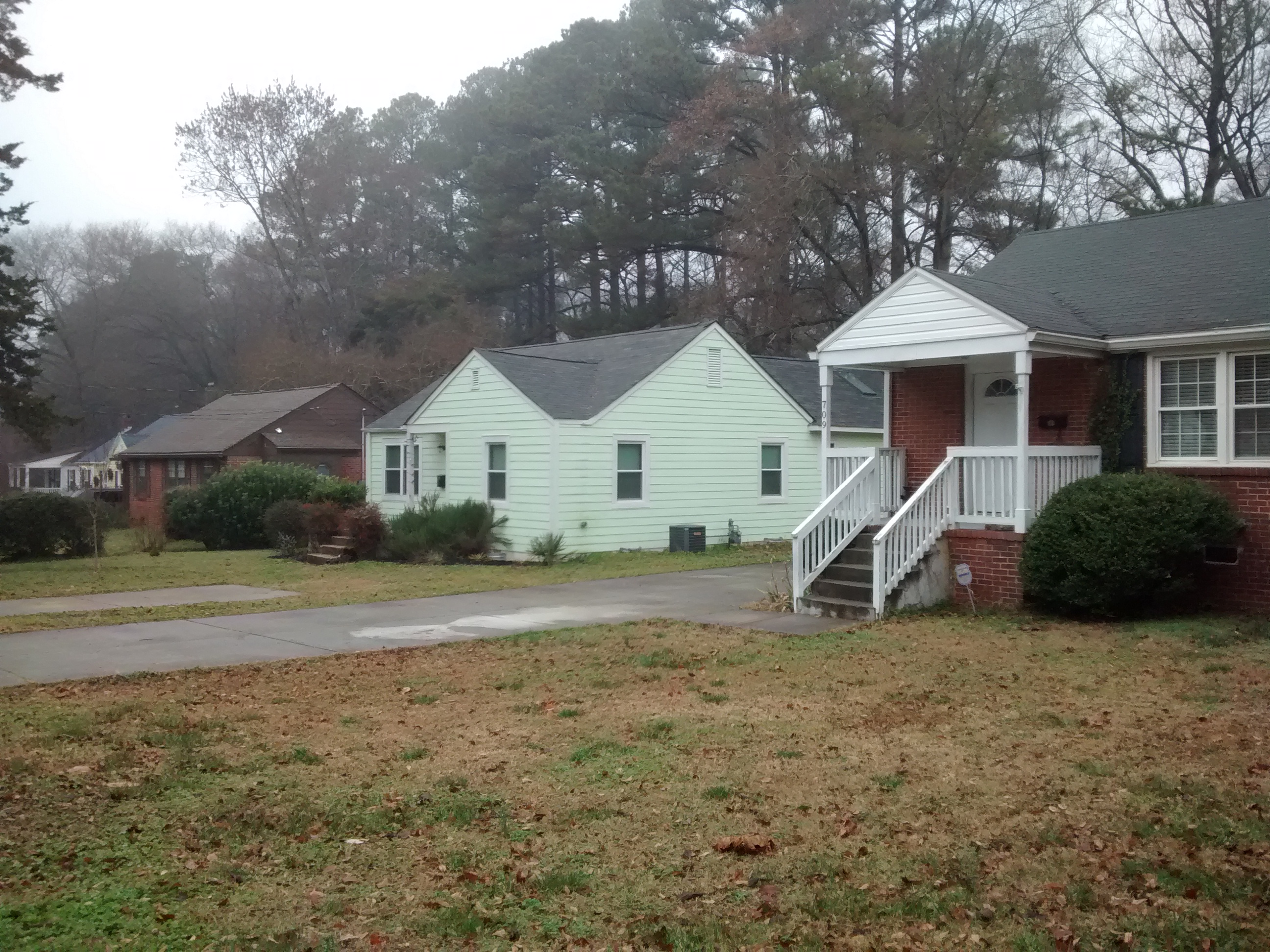
- Houses in Capitol Heights Historic District.

- Location within North Carolina Location within the United States
- Location: Roughly bounded by Penn Rd., North State St., Glascock St., and Madison Rd., Raleigh, North Carolina
- Coordinates: 35°47′26″N 78°37′18″W
- Area: 30 acres (12 ha)
- Built by: Wright Construction Co.; Clancy Construction Co. (Clancy & Scott, Inc.); Curtis Construction
- Architectural style: Minimal Traditional
- MPS: Post-World War II and Modern Architecture in Raleigh, North Carolina, 1945-1965
- NRHP reference No.: 10001112
- Added to NRHP: January 3, 2011

Capitol Heights Historic District is a historic post-World War II neighborhood and national historic district located just north of the city of Raleigh, North Carolina. Built between about 1946 and 1949, the district currently encompasses 87 contributing buildings.

The subdivision was platted in 1946 and developed as a result of the postwar housing demand. Its homes are homogenous in form and design: small one-story two- and three-bedroom houses constructed in the Minimal Traditional style. Ernest I. Clancy and George Henry Wright were the primary builders of the Capitol Heights neighborhood. Today the neighborhood represents one of the best-preserved post-war speculative subdivisions in Raleigh.

Due to its high level of integrity, Capitol Heights was placed on the National Register of Historic Places in January 2011.

== See also ==
- National Register of Historic Places listings in Wake County, North Carolina
