= Janice Cole =

American politician

Janice McKenzie Cole is an American attorney who served as the United States Attorney for the Eastern District of North Carolina (1994–2001) under President Bill Clinton.

During her tenure as U.S. Attorney, she helped introduce five communities to the United States Department of Justice's Weed and Seed crime-prevention program. Cole has been honored as Woman of the Year by the East Carolina University Branch of the American Association of University Women and Tarheel of the Week by The News and Observer.

== Education and career ==
She received her Bachelor of Science degree with highest honors from John Jay College of Criminal Justice, part of the City University of New York. She also has a master's degree in public administration from John Jay. She received her Juris Doctor degree from Fordham University in 1979.

Cole, a native New Yorker, is a former New York City police officer, and was in one of the first groups of female police officers assigned to patrol the streets in high crime areas. Upon her completion of law school, Cole served as an Assistant United States Attorney in the Eastern District of New York.

In 1983 she moved to Hertford, North Carolina, a rural community in North Carolina and started a private practice. Seven years later she was elected to serve as a state District Court Judge. She was the first black and first woman to serve as a judge in that district. She held that position until she was sworn in as the United States Attorney in February, 1994.

Cole unsuccessfully ran for the United States House of Representatives in 2002.

In 2008, she was selected by the North Carolina Democratic Party to be a member of the United States Electoral College, voting for Barack Obama and Joe Biden on behalf of the state's voters. When the state's electoral college met, Cole and elector Kara Hollingsworth, both African-Americans, formally nominated Obama.

Cole was one of the initial members of an advisory committee appointed by U.S. Sen. Kay Hagan to help her recommend nominees for U.S. attorneys and federal judgeships in North Carolina.

In January 2023, Cole was appointed as the town manager of Hertford, North Carolina, where she resides with her husband. Prior to her appointment, she was the interim manager of the town.

== Personal life ==
Cole is married to J. Carlton Cole, who was a District Court Judge for the 1st Judicial District of North Carolina until his appointment to the North Carolina Superior Court in 2009 by Governor Beverly Perdue. They reside in Hertford.
