= S. Thomas Currin II =

American judge (born 1984)

Special Judge of the North Carolina Superior Court
- Incumbent
- Assumed office January 1, 2025

Personal details
- Born: June 18, 1984 (age 41) Raleigh, North Carolina, U.S.
- Party: Republican
- Parent(s): Sam Currin; Margaret Person
- Education: Hampden–Sydney College (BA); Campbell University (JD)
- Occupation: lawyer

Samuel Thomas Currin II (born June 18, 1984) is an American lawyer. He was appointed as a Special Judge to the North Carolina Superior Court in 2025.

== Early life, family, and education ==
Currin was born on June 18, 1984 in Raleigh, North Carolina. His father, Samuel Thomas Currin, was a United States Attorney for the Eastern District of North Carolina, a judge on the North Carolina Superior Court, and chairman of the North Carolina Republican Party. His mother, Margaret Person Currin, was the first woman to be appointed as a United States Attorney in North Carolina and served as an associate dean at Campbell University's Norman Adrian Wiggins School of Law.

He attended St. Timothy's–Hale School (now St. David's School) and Hampden–Sydney College, where he was a member of the student court, jazz band, glee club, and the Pre-Law Society. He earned a juris doctor from Norman Adrian Wiggins School of Law at Campbell University in 2010. While at Campbell, he served as Chairman of the Law School Honor Court and as president of Phi Alpha Delta.

== Career ==
Currin is an attorney with the firm Rik Lovett & Associates.

On January 1, 2025, upon the recommendation of Senator Phil Berger and Rep. Howard Penny Jr., the North Carolina General Assembly appointed Currin to the North Carolina Superior Court as a Special Judge for a term expiring in 2032.

As a judge, he set a $25,000 bond for a 28-year-old man charged with causing a death by driving under the influence of alcohol in Louisburg, North Carolina. In April 2025, Currin dismissed a legal complaint about dredging filed against the town of Sunset Beach, North Carolina. In July 2025, he signed a nuisance abatement consent judgment and final order of abatement following an investigation by the North Carolina Alcohol Law Enforcement Division and Police Chief Cary Jackson into Pinewood Apartments in Dunn, North Carolina. In October 24, 2025, he was a speaker at Campbell Law Alumni Association's 10th Anniversary "Campbell Judges Speak" Continuing Legal Education event. In December 2025, he dismissed claims made by former provost Chris Clemens against the University of North Carolina at Chapel Hill alleging the deliberate destruction of public records and unlawful electronic meeting without notice.

On February 26, 2026, Currin signed a deal between Republican and Democratic groups and the North Carolina State Board of Elections to end a lawsuit over incomplete voter registration records.

== Personal life ==
Currin is Baptist and a parishioner at Hayes Barton Baptist Church in Raleigh.
