= Sam Currin =

American judge

Chair of the North Carolina Republican Party
- In office 1996–1999
- Succeeded by: Bill Cobey

North Carolina Superior Court Judge
- In office 1987–1990
- Appointed by: James G. Martin

United States Attorney for the Eastern District of North Carolina
- In office 1981–1987
- President: Ronald Reagan
- Preceded by: James L. Blackburn
- Succeeded by: Douglas McCullough

Personal details
- Party: Republican
- Spouse: Margaret Person
- Children: S. Thomas Currin II
- Education: Wake Forest University; University of North Carolina at Chapel Hill; Southeastern Baptist Theological Seminary
- Occupation: lawyer politician minister

Samuel Thomas Currin Sr. is an American Baptist minister, retired judge, and former lawyer. He served as United States Attorney for the Eastern District of North Carolina from 1981 to 1987 and as a North Carolina Superior Court Judge from 1987 to 1990. He also served as the Chair of the North Carolina Republican Party and as Judge Advocate in Chief for the Sons of Confederate Veterans. Currin was imprisoned in 2007 for money laundering and obstruction of justice. He was released in 2009 after providing a testimony against one of his co-conspirators.

== Education ==
Currin graduated with honors from Wake Forest University, earned a juris doctor from the University of North Carolina School of Law, and earned a master's degree in Ethics, Theology and Culture and a doctorate in Christian Education from Southeastern Baptist Theological Seminary.

== Career ==
=== Law and politics ===
Currin began his career working as a federal prosecutor in Raleigh, North Carolina before being hired as a legislative worker by Senator Jesse Helms.

Upon Helms's recommendation, Currin was appointed the United States Attorney for the United States District Court for the Eastern District of North Carolina by President Ronald Reagan in 1981 and served in that capacity until 1987. As a U.S. attorney, Currin oversaw the prosecution of the perpetrators of Colcor, a corruption case involving government officials in Columbus County. In 1986, he prosecuted members of the White Patriot Party, a neo-Nazi paramilitary group. He also prosecuted dozens of drug conspiracy cases in Brunswick County.

Helms recommended Currin for a federal judgeship, but withdrew the recommendation after Raleigh lawyers opposed the nomination. In 1987, Governor James G. Martin appointed him to the North Carolina Superior Court. He served on the court until 1990.

He was elected as chairman of the North Carolina Republican Party in 1996 and served until 1999. He was a member of the Electoral College of the United States, representing North Carolina during the 2000 United States presidential election, where he voted for George W. Bush and Dick Cheney.

Following his term on the court, Currin worked in private practice. The waiting room of his law office in downtown Raleigh was reportedly decorated with paintings of General Robert E. Lee and other famous Confederates and supplied issues of Southern Partisan and Confederate Veteran magazines to clients. During this time, he served pro bono as legal chief for the North Carolina Division of the Sons of Confederate Veterans (SCV) . According to a report by the Southern Poverty Law Center, he fought against anti-racism efforts within the organization. He ratified the expulsion of three hundred SCV members and barred entry to Walt Hilderman III, a leading member who planned to run for the SCV's Commander in Chief of the Sons of Confederate Veterans on an anti-racist platform, from the SCV's annual convention in July 2004. Denne Sweeney, who was elected SCV Commander in Chief, appointed Currin as Judge Advocate in Chief, the highest legal post in the SCV. He resigned from the position upon being indicted in 2006.

==== Arrest and imprisonment ====
Currin was indicted in 2006 following a three-year-long undercover investigation. In November 2006, Currin pled guilty to charges of money laundering and obstruction of justice. He admitted to lying and failing to surrender documents to a grand jury, failing to report $6,000 in income to the Internal Revenue Service, and to laundering around $1.4 million in a securities fraud scheme run by a spam email company. According to prosecutors, Currin profited over $240,000 for his involvement in the scheme, which used spam emails, unsolicited faxes, internet search optimization, and voice mail broadcasting to manipulate the stock prices of multiple publicly traded companies. In September 2007, he was sentenced to almost six years in prison. After Currin testified against one of his co-conspirators, federal prosecutors recommended a reduced sentence. In 2009, a judge issued a release order for Currin.

=== Ministry and political advocacy ===
Currin is an ordained Southern Baptist minister and an advocate for K-12 Christian education. In 1974, he attended one of Billy Graham's crusades at Carter–Finley Stadium. In the 1980s and 1990s, he served on the board of directors of the Baptist Joint Committee for Religious Liberty and played an important role in the Southern Baptist Convention's decision to defund it's public affairs agency in 1990. He served on the board of directors of the Baptist State Convention of North Carolina until his resignation in April 2006.

In 1987, he lobbied for the Southern Baptist Convention to endorse Robert Bork following his 1897 nomination to the United States Supreme Court.

In 2023, he served as a guest minister at Holden Beach Chapel in Holden Beach, North Carolina.

He has written op-eds for the Carolina Journal about Billy Graham and promoting Christian and private education and freedom of religion. Currin also wrote for North State Journal, criticizing the administrations of Presidents George H. W. Bush, Bill Clinton, George W. Bush, Barack Obama, and Joe Biden and praising the efforts of President Donald Trump. He also criticized the Kamala Harris 2024 presidential campaign for supporting abortion rights. In 2025, he condemned the assassination of Charlie Kirk and referred to Kirk as a "Christian martyr".

Currin donated to the NC Heritage PAC, a conservative political action committee, in 2016.

In 2023, he claimed that the United States had an "aggressive secular culture" that was "attempting to force ideological conformity on people of faith" and accused LGBTQ activists and "leftist politicians" of seeking political revenge against the Supreme Court for its rulings in Groff v. DeJoy and 303 Creative LLC v. Elenis.

== Personal life ==
Currin is married to Margaret P. Currin, who also served as a United States Attorney for the Eastern District of North Carolina. Their son, S. Thomas Currin II, is a superior court judge.

He is a member of Hayes Barton Baptist Church in Raleigh.
