= Raleigh Little Theatre =

Coordinates: 35.791340°N 78.668214°W

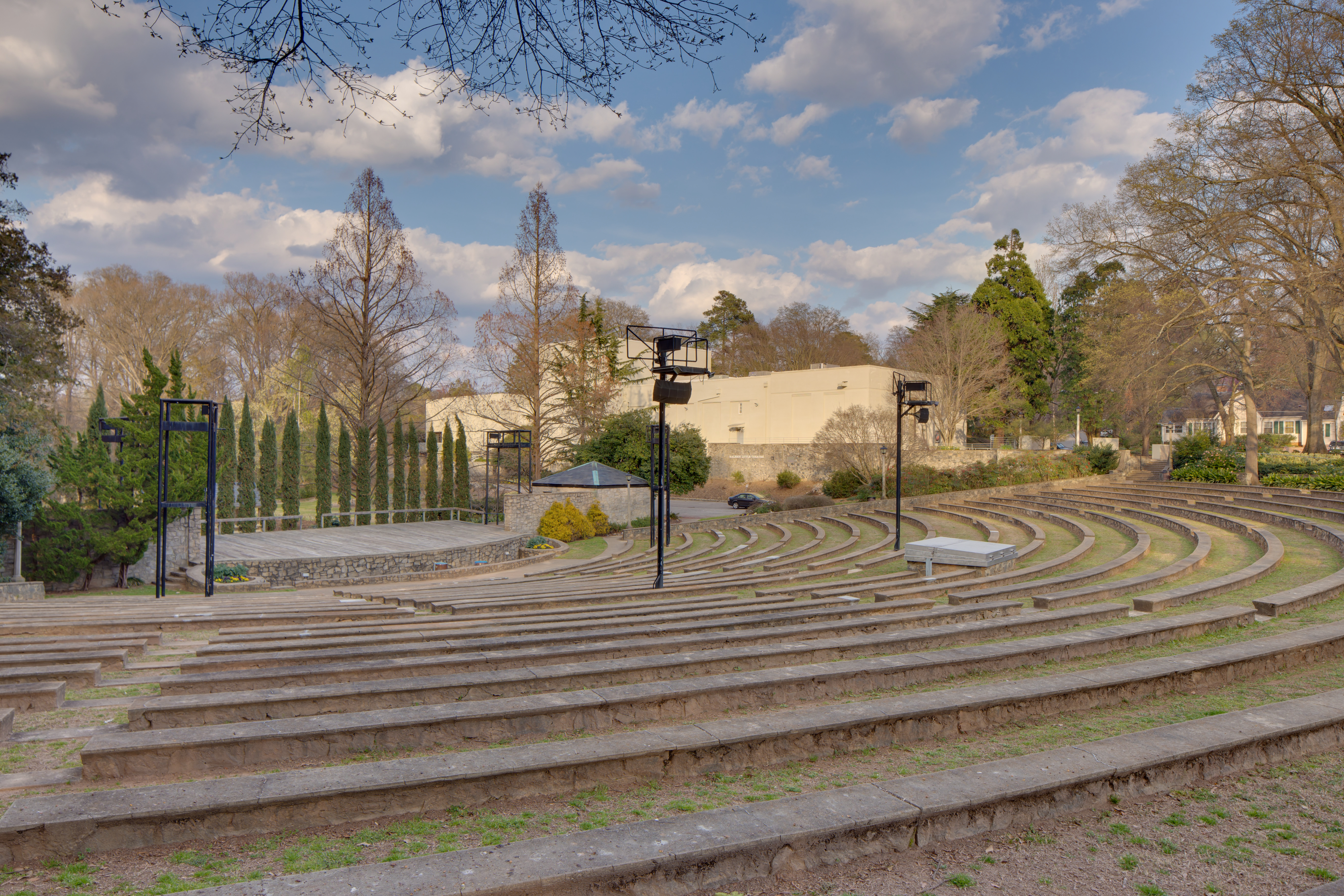
- Formation: 1936
- Type: Theatre group
- Website: raleighlittletheatre.org

Raleigh Little Theatre (RLT) is a community theatre in Raleigh, North Carolina, that produces 10 to 11 full productions annually and conducts youth and adult theatre education programs.

== About ==
Raleigh Little Theatre was established in 1936 to provide community theatre performances and opportunities for residents. RLT produces 11 shows each season, professionally supported by complete on-site costume and scene shops, along with a full and part-time professional staff of 16 and more than 600 community volunteers. With the largest subscription base of any community theatre in the area (3,000+), RLT serves more than 40,000 people with shows each season. A total of 10 to 11 shows are produced annually, professionally supported by complete on-site costume and scene shops.

== History ==
Raleigh Little Theatre started in 1935-36 when a group of Raleigh performers joined forces with technical workers from the Federal Theatre Project to bring community theatre to Raleigh. The theatre celebrated its 75th Anniversary Season in 2010–2011. The Piano Lesson, in October 2010, was the theatre's 600th production.

Then, civic leader Cantey Venable Sutton started the Works Progress Administration construction of the main theatre, amphitheatre, and Rose Garden. In 2000, the main theatre was named in honor of Sutton. RLT's annual performance awards, given each June, have been called "Canteys" in her honor for a number of decades.

RLT was the first community theatre in the South to cast actors of color during segregation.

== Venues ==
The Raleigh Little Theatre facility includes three on-site venues: the 298-seat Cantey V. Sutton Theatre built in 1939; the outdoor 2000-seat RLT's Louise "Scottie" Stephenson Amphitheatre, also built in 1939; and the 150-seat Gaddy-Goodwin Teaching Theatre built in 1990.

== Special events ==
Raleigh Little Theatre stages several special events throughout the year, including fundraisers for the theatre, as well as social gatherings to recognize their volunteers.

== Youth education programs ==
Each year, RLT serves more than 900 children and adults in its year-round on-site and satellite education programs through the Dianne Davidian Education Program. In addition, more than 1,000 Wake County students are served in the classroom, at youth organizations and on-site are reached through its RLT Blue Cross and Blue Shield of North Carolina Active Arts Outreach Program.

In 2003, RLT launched its RLT/Blue Cross and Blue Shield of North Carolina Arts Active Outreach Program to bring its award-winning, process-oriented, youth education program directly into the classroom. During the first six months of the program, more than 1,000 students had the opportunity to experience the theatrical arts either through workshops, in-classroom residencies or special performances in schools that otherwise would not have been possible.

== Notable performers ==
- Andy Griffith performed at RLT in the early 1940s
- Frankie Muniz
- Clay Aiken
- Ava Gardner
- Lachlan Watson

== See also ==
- List of contemporary amphitheatres
