= West Raleigh Historic District =

Historic district in North Carolina, United States

- U.S. National Register of Historic Places
- U.S. Historic district
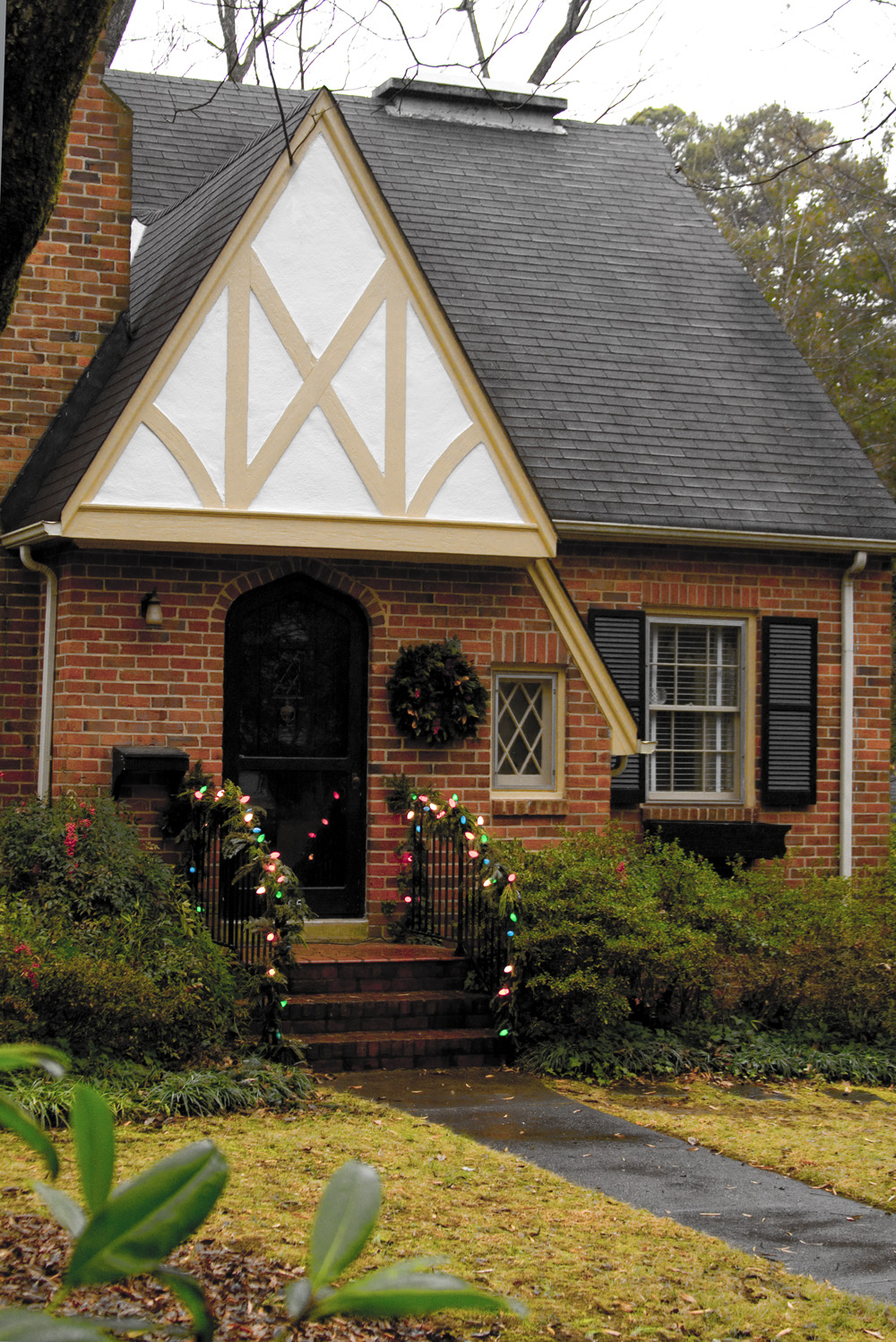
- One of the many small homes in the district

- Location within North Carolina Location within the United States
- Location: Roughly bounded by Mayview Rd., Enterprise St., Hillsbourgh St. and Faircloth St., Raleigh, North Carolina
- Coordinates: 35°47′42″N 78°40′24″W
- Area: 332 acres (134 ha)
- Architect: Deitrick, William Henley; Haines, H.N.
- Architectural style: Bungalow/Craftsman, Colonial Revival
- NRHP reference No.: 03001300
- Added to NRHP: December 18, 2003

The West Raleigh Historic District in Raleigh, North Carolina is a national historic district listed on the National Register of Historic Places in 2003. Located 1.5 miles (2.41 km) west-northwest of the State Capitol, the district encompasses approximately 332 acres (134 ha). Neighborhoods in the district include: Bedford Heights, Bagwell, Blue Moon Ridge, College Crest (now known as Stanhope), Fairmont, Forest Hills, Harris-Chamberlain, and Wilmont. Most homes in these neighborhoods are one-story and were constructed between the 1930s to 1950s. While the district is mostly residential, churches and commercial buildings are common along Hillsborough Street.

Enterprise Street, Chamberlain Street, and Rosemont Avenue form the eastern boundaries of the district. Mayview Road, Rosedale Avenue, Ruffin Street, and Furches Street form the northern boundary while Faircloth Street is the district's western boundary. Hillsborough Street forms the southern boundary, except from Dixie Trail to Henderson Street where the boundary moves southward to include the Stanhope neighborhood. Most of the district residents include faculty and students from North Carolina State University.

== See also ==
- List of Registered Historic Places in North Carolina
