= William B. Umstead =

American politician

William Bradley Umstead
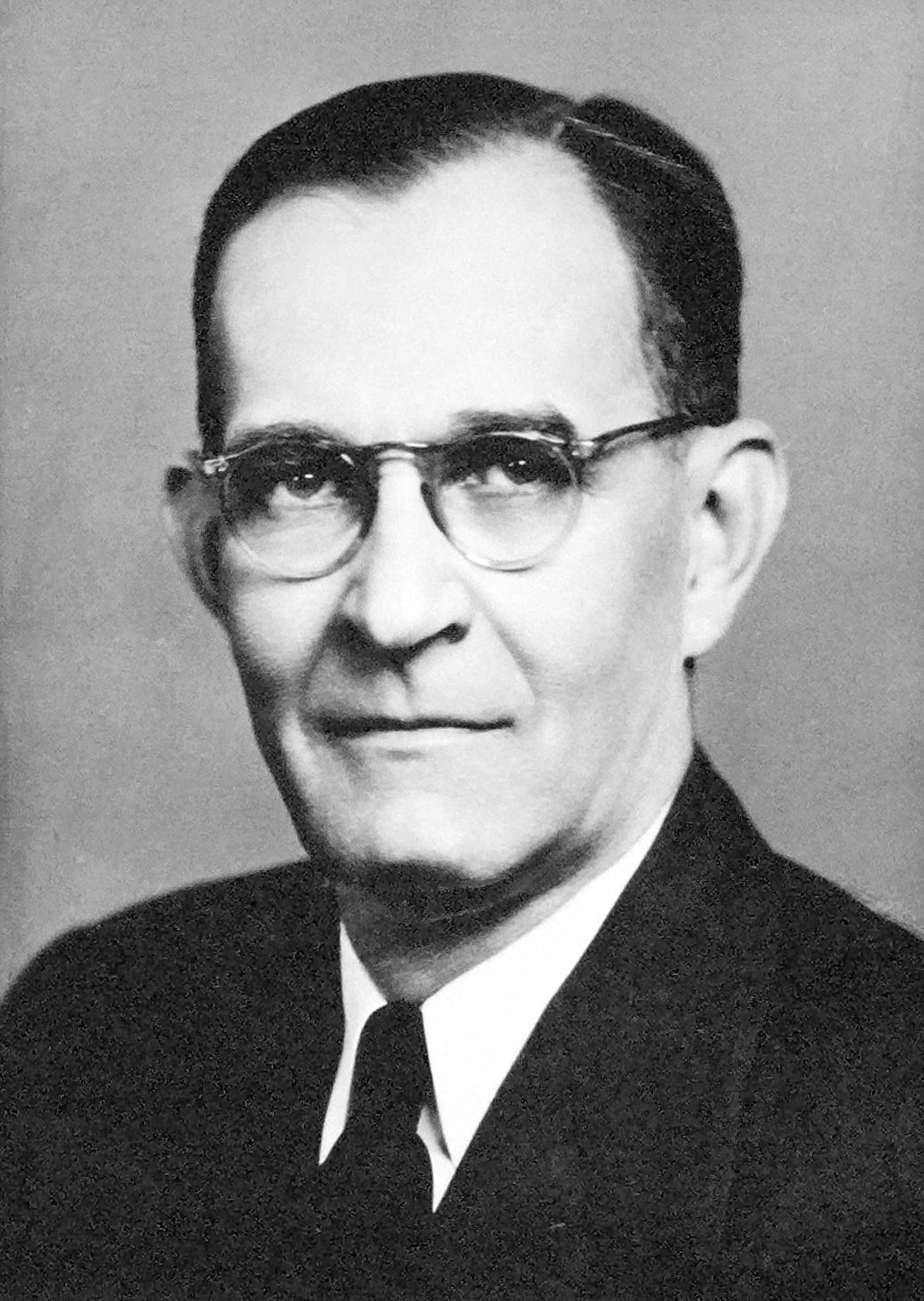
- Umstead, c. 1952

63rd Governor of North Carolina
- In office January 8, 1953 – November 7, 1954
- Lieutenant: Luther H. Hodges
- Preceded by: W. Kerr Scott
- Succeeded by: Luther H. Hodges

United States Senator from North Carolina
- In office December 18, 1946 – December 30, 1948
- Appointed by: R. Gregg Cherry
- Preceded by: Josiah Bailey
- Succeeded by: J. Melville Broughton

Member of the U.S. House of Representatives from North Carolina's 6th district
- In office March 4, 1933 – January 3, 1939
- Preceded by: J. Bayard Clark
- Succeeded by: Carl T. Durham

Personal details
- Born: May 13, 1895 Mangum Township, Durham County, North Carolina, U.S.
- Died: November 7, 1954 (aged 59) Durham, North Carolina, U.S.
- Resting place: Mount Tabor Church Cemetery Rougemont, North Carolina
- Party: Democratic
- Spouse: Merle Holland Davis
- Children: 1
- Education: University of North Carolina at Chapel Hill; Trinity College

Military service
- Allegiance: United States
- Branch/service: United States Army
- Years of service: 1917–1918
- Rank: First Lieutenant
- Battles/wars: World War I

William Bradley Umstead (May 13, 1895 – November 7, 1954) was an American politician who served as the 63rd governor of North Carolina from 1953 until his death in 1954. A Southern Democrat, he previously represented North Carolina in the U.S. Senate from 1946 to 1948 and in the U.S. House of Representatives from 1933 to 1939. He was a veteran of World War I.

== Early life and education ==
Umstead was born in the northern Durham County township of Mangum Township in 1895. In 1916, he earned a bachelor's degree in history from the University of North Carolina at Chapel Hill where, like several of North Carolina's UNC-alumni Governors before him, he was a member of the Philanthropic Society. Reflecting on his time as a Phi, in 1948 Umstead (then a U.S. Senator) asserted in an article to the Daily Tar Heel "If I had in my hand everything I learned in the halls of [the Philanthropic Society] and in my left hand everything I learned in the University, I wouldn't swap my experiences in debating for other things I've learned here in the University."

== Career ==
Umstead taught high school history for approximately one school year before joining the United States Army after the American entry into World War I in April 1917. He served as an officer and saw combat in France; Umstead was discharged in 1919 as a first lieutenant. He served with the 317th Machine Gun Battalion of the 81st "Wildcat" Division.

He later entered law school at Trinity College (now Duke University). Umstead was a prosecutor for most of his legal career and served as the elected solicitor (today called district attorney) for a five-county district from 1927 to 1933.

He served from 1933 to 1939 in the United States House of Representatives, choosing not to seek re-election in 1938. Umstead was chairman of the North Carolina Democratic Party for several years until he was appointed to fill a vacant United States Senate seat in 1946. After President Harry Truman proposed civil rights legislation in 1948, Umstead suggested he not seek reelection and told a state Democrat official that he would not support his candidacy. Defeated for a Senate term of his own in 1948, Umstead ran for governor in 1952 and won.

Umstead spent several weeks preparing his inaugural address. He was inaugurated as Governor of North Carolina on January 8, 1953, at the Memorial Auditorium. He delivered an hour-long speech outlining his extensive legislative program, including a 10 percent salary increase for public school staff retroactive to 1 July 1952, passage of a bill requiring vehicle inspections and establishment of a drivers' education program in every public high school, bond issues to construct facilities for the treatment and education of the mentally ill and to build schools, and a statewide referendum on the legalization of liquor sales. He also criticized his predecessor's road construction program, saying it placed a large financial burden upon the state. Umstead was exhausted by the days' ceremonies and was feeling ill, but he stood to greet visitors at the Executive Mansion for four hours and attended a ball in the evening.

Umstead spent most of the following day getting his office in order, and on January 10 he went to work in his Durham law firm before retiring to his home near Bahama in the evening. He called a doctor when he could not fall asleep due to a cough, and after midnight he was taken to Watts Hospital in Durham. Once there, his doctor discovered that he had suffered a heart attack and was close to developing pneumonia. His doctor released a statement saying that the governor had suffered "a mild attack of heart trouble" and was quickly improving, hoping to be released in 12 to 15 days. Leaders in the North Carolina General Assembly were unsure if they should proceed with their session while Umstead was hospitalized, but he insisted they begin their work while at the same time giving no instructions to the presiding officer of the Senate, Lieutenant Governor Luther H. Hodges. The two men had tense relations since their campaigns, when Umstead sought to distance himself from Hodges. Umstead also gave Hodges no indications of his legislative agenda, and ignored him throughout his term.

Umstead remained in the hospital for 27 days and returned to the Executive Mansion under the condition that he stay in bed and work limited hours. He had his brother John and former Speaker of the House W. Frank Taylor direct most of his legislative program. Small groups of legislators would visit him in his bedroom to discuss his plans. He never fully recovered from his heart attack and remained unwell. In June 1953 U.S. Senator Willis Smith died. The media immediately began speculating about who Umstead would appoint to serve the remaining 18 months of Smith's term. Umstead said little publicly other than that his choice would be of someone with agricultural concerns and respect North Carolina's traditional east–west balance in representation in government. North Carolina's other senator, Clyde Hoey, hailed from the western portion of the state, so it was assumed that Umstead would nominate an easterner. On July 10 Umstead made the surprise appointment of Alton Lennon to the office, a lawyer from Wilmington who had worked on Umstead's Senate and gubernatorial campaigns. Umstead's friends suggested that the governor had made the decision simply to get over with it, while observers speculated that Lennon was intended to be a dark horse candidate who could prevail through the next Senate election by being attached to Umstead's popularity.

Hoey died on May 12, 1954, thus presenting Umstead with the chance to fill a second U.S. Senate vacancy, an opportunity not afforded to a governor in the United States since 1936. Shortly thereafter the Supreme Court of the United States issued its decision in Brown v. Board of Education, ruling that the racial segregation of public schools was unconstitutional. Umstead was angered by the decision, feeling the court had overstepped its bounds and undercut state's rights to spend their own money, but he believed in the rule of law and felt obligated not to dismiss the ruling out of hand. He also thought a charged public response would be undignified and politically risky. In June 1954, Umstead appointed Sam Ervin to fill Hoey's vacancy.

== Death ==
Umstead's health declined over the course of his term, worsened by his insistence on his strenuous amount of work. On the afternoon of November 4 Umstead, feeling ill, retired from his office to his bed in the Executive Mansion. His doctor ordered him to be taken to Watts Hospital, while the governor's office released a statement saying a severe cold had disturbed Umstead's heart. Umstead packed a briefcase full of documents so he could continue to work while hospitalized, but his health did not improve and he did not open the briefcase while at Watts. He died there at 9:10 AM on November 7 with his wife and daughter at his side. A funeral was held two days later and immediately afterwards Hodges was sworn in as Governor of North Carolina. Umstead is buried in the Mount Tabor Church Cemetery in Mangum Township in Rougemont, near Bahama.

The William B. Umstead Bridge in Dare County, North Carolina was named in his honor in 1957. In 1966, the state of North Carolina named the William B. Umstead State Park in Raleigh, North Carolina in his honor, as well.

== Works cited ==
- Christensen, Rob (2010). The Paradox of Tar Heel Politics: The Personalities, Elections, and Events That Shaped Modern North Carolina (second ed.). Chapel Hill: The University of North Carolina Press. ISBN 978-0-8078-7151-5.
- Covington, Howard E. Jr; Ellis, Marion A. (1999). Terry Sanford: Politics, Progress, and Outrageous Ambitions. Durham: Duke University Press. ISBN 978-0-8223-2356-3.

Party political offices
| Preceded by W. Kerr Scott | Democratic nominee for Governor of North Carolina; 1952 | Succeeded by Luther H. Hodges |
U.S. House of Representatives
| Preceded by J. Bayard Clark | Member of the U.S. House of Representatives from North Carolina's 6th congressional district March 4, 1933-January 3, 1939 | Succeeded by Carl T. Durham |
U.S. Senate
| Preceded by Josiah William Bailey | U.S. senator (Class 2) from North Carolina; December 18, 1946– December 30, 1948; Served alongside: Clyde Roark Hoey | Succeeded by Joseph Melville Broughton |
Political offices
| Preceded by W. Kerr Scott | Governor of North Carolina; January 8, 1953– November 7, 1954 | Succeeded by Luther H. Hodges |
