= Hi-Mount Historic District =

Historic district in North Carolina, United States

- U.S. National Register of Historic Places
- U.S. Historic district
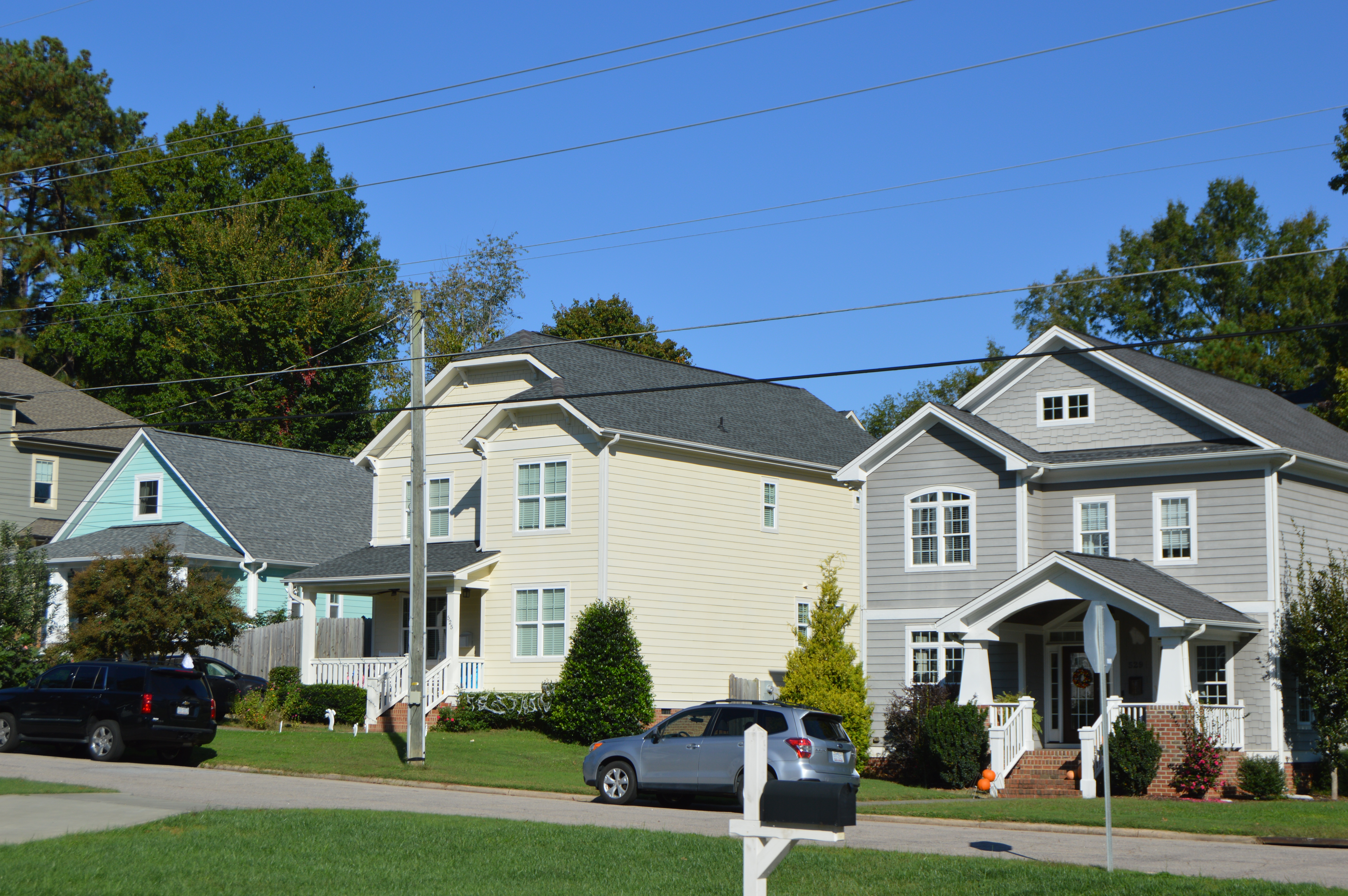
- Houses on Mial Street

- Location within North Carolina Location within the United States
- Location: Roughly bounded by E. Whitaker Mill Rd. and Bernard, Peebles, Main, and Hilton Sts., Raleigh, North Carolina
- Coordinates: 35°48′41″N 78°37′53″W
- Area: 30 acres (12 ha)
- Built by: Allied Building Company; G.H. Wright, Jr. (Wright Construction Co.); Hi-Mount Homes, Inc.; Pine Ridge Homes, Inc.
- Architectural style: Minimal Traditional, Cape Cod, Ranch
- MPS: Post-World War II and Modern Architecture in Raleigh, North Carolina, 1945-1965
- NRHP reference No.: 11000484
- Added to NRHP: July 29, 2011

The Hi-Mount Historic District is a historic neighborhood located two miles north of downtown Raleigh, North Carolina, United States. The eleven-block district, developed between 1938 and 1951, is one of the city's best-preserved twentieth century speculative neighborhoods. The district encompasses 168 contributing buildings and 1 contributing site. Most of Hi-Mount's homes are Minimal Traditional in style, followed by Cape Cod and Ranch homes with sparse detailing. A small number of developers were involved with the district and the district also benefited from government housing financing programs such as the Federal Housing Administration and the Veteran's Administration, resulting in architectural consistency throughout the neighborhood.

It was listed on the National Register of Historic Places in 2011.

== See also ==
- List of Registered Historic Places in North Carolina
