= Hayes Barton Baptist Church =

Church in Raleigh, North Carolina

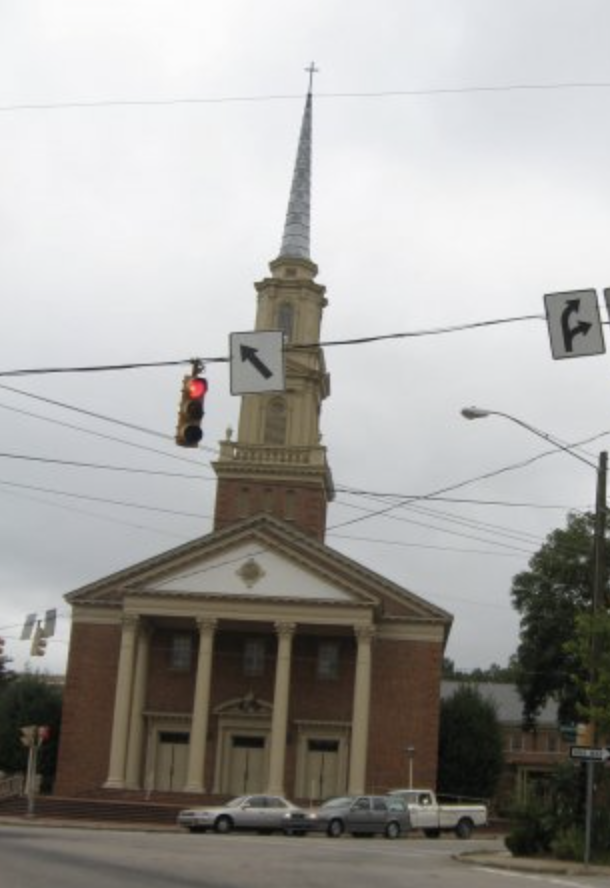
- Hayes Barton Baptist Church in 2007

Religion
- Affiliation: Cooperative Baptist
- Leadership: Rev. Dr. David J. Hailey
- Status: Active

Location
- Location: 1800 Glenwood Ave; Raleigh, North Carolina, U.S.
- Interactive map of Hayes Barton Baptist Church
- Coordinates: 35.8046°N 78.6455°W

Architecture
- Type: Colonial Georgian
- Completed: 1965

Website
- hbbc.org

Hayes Barton Baptist Church is a historic Baptist church in Raleigh, North Carolina. The church is located at the heart of Five Points and is part of the Hayes Barton Historic District.

== History ==
Hayes Barton Baptist Church was chartered in 1926. It was built in the Hayes Barton neighborhood at the main intersection of Five Points. Historically, the church was a white congregation during the Jim Crow era.

A temporary wooden church was first constructed in 1926 and the first service was held on Thanksgiving Day, November 25, 1926. The structure was torn down in 1927 and construction began on a Classical brick church, including classrooms, an office space, a kitchen, and a 850-seat sanctuary. An educational building, including an 140-seat chapel, was built in 1953. On September 5, 1962, the sanctuary and a large portion of the church were destroyed by a fire. The current Colonial Georgian-style church was completed on January 3, 1965.

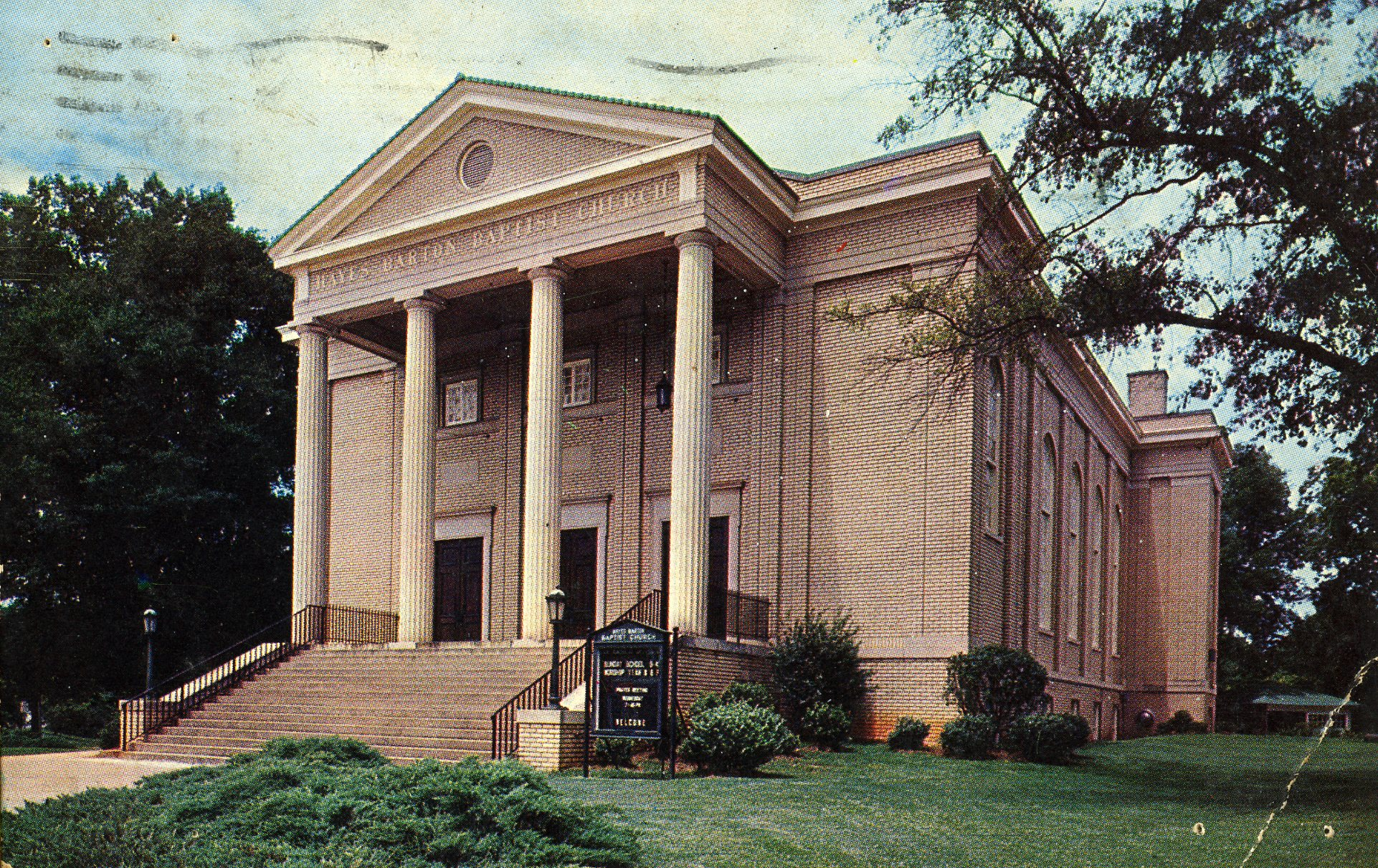
Hayes Barton Baptist Church in the 1960s

An affluent congregation, the church historically was a strong financial supporter of the Southern Baptist Convention (SBC) and the Baptist State Convention of North Carolina. As the SBC became more conservative, the congregation considered cutting it's ties with the convention and becoming exclusively Cooperative Baptist but decided to align with elements of both as a "moderate" Baptist church. Hayes Barton is affiliated with the Raleigh Baptist Association, theCooperative Baptist Fellowship of North Carolina, the Baptist State Convention of NC, and the Cooperative Baptist Fellowship.

In the 1970s, the church changed its constitution to include women in the diaconate. The church later ordained women pastors.

In 2019, the church demolished three houses that it owned along White Oak Road to expand their parking lots. The congregation turned another three houses owned by the church into affordable housing.
