= J. Melville Broughton =

American politician

J. Melville Broughton Jr.
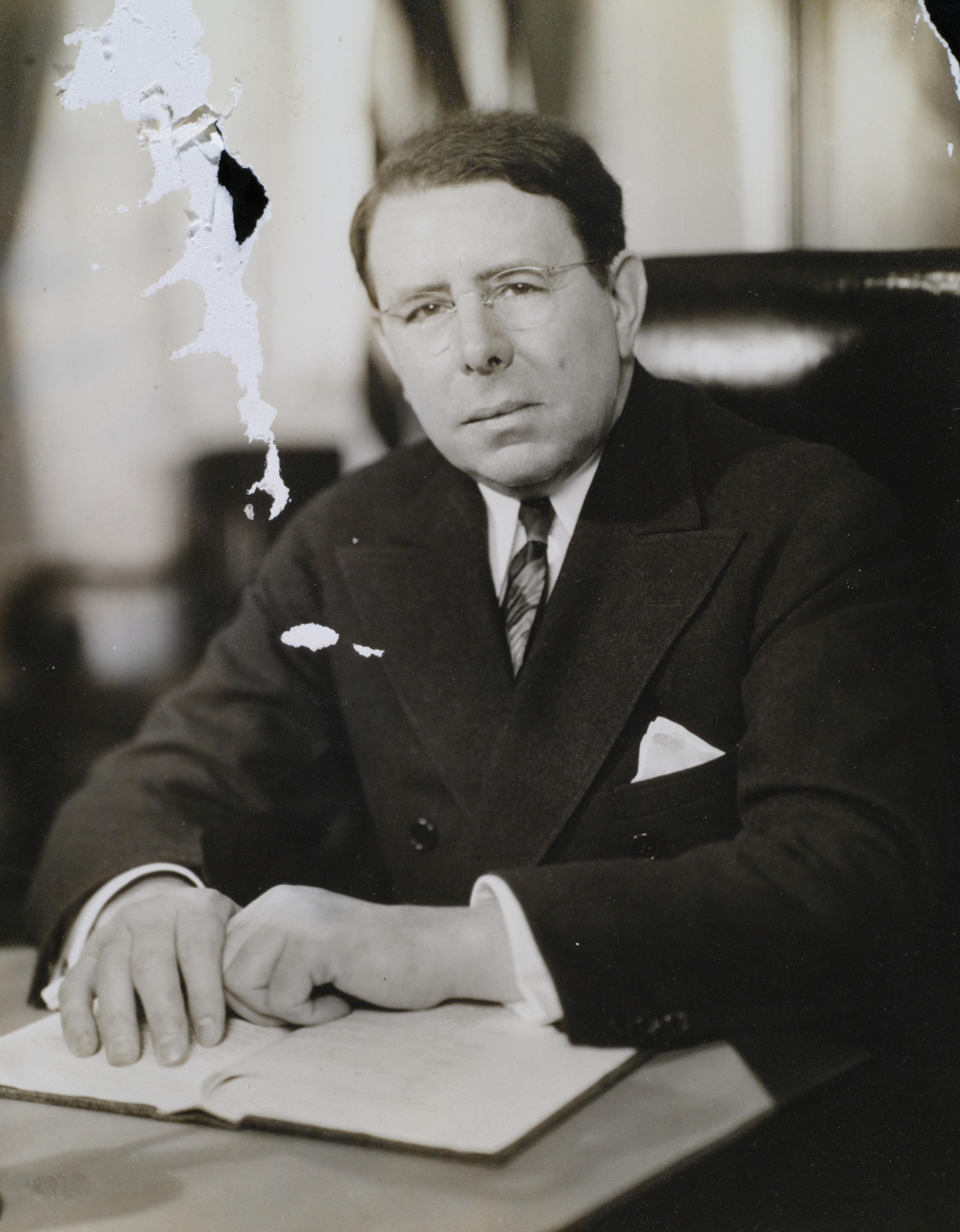

United States Senator from North Carolina
- In office December 31, 1948 – March 6, 1949
- Preceded by: William B. Umstead
- Succeeded by: Frank P. Graham

60th Governor of North Carolina
- In office January 9, 1941 – January 4, 1945
- Lieutenant: Reginald L. Harris
- Preceded by: Clyde R. Hoey
- Succeeded by: R. Gregg Cherry

Personal details
- Born: Joseph Melville Broughton Jr. November 17, 1888 Raleigh, North Carolina, U.S.
- Died: March 6, 1949 (aged 60) Washington, D.C., U.S.
- Party: Democratic
- Spouse: Alice Willson
- Children: 4
- Education: Wake Forest University, Harvard Law School

Joseph Melville Broughton Jr. (November 17, 1888 – March 6, 1949) was an American politician who served as the 60th governor of North Carolina from 1941 to 1945. He later briefly served as a United States senator from January 3, 1949, until his death in office approximately two months later.

== Early life and education ==
Broughton was born on November 17, 1888, in Raleigh, North Carolina. He graduated from Wake Forest College, where he also played football, in 1910. Broughton attended Harvard Law School then worked as a school principal and journalist before actively entering the legal profession.

== Political career ==
He served in the North Carolina Senate from 1927 to 1929. He later served one term as governor from 1941 to 1945. Identified with progressive politics, as characterized by his support of the social justice legislation of the Roosevelt Administration, a number of reforms were carried out during his term as governor. One of his major legacies was the extension of the public school term from six to nine months.

The North Carolina Department of Natural and Cultural Resources describes Broughton as the typical white moderate of the time. Broughton advocated for the improvement of the lives of African Americans, such as equalizing the salaries of black and white teachers and improving their housing. In one instance, Broughton even helped stop a lynching and then punish the leaders of the mob.

In August 1941, Broughton deployed the North Carolina National Guard to protect Cy Winstead, a black man accused of raping a white woman, after Winstead was nearly lynched in Roxboro, North Carolina. Afterwards, Broughton had the police investigate the mobs, expressing interest in punishing the ringleaders. Ten white men were charged. To local shock, five of the men, Coy Harris, A.P. Spriggs, P.I. Holt, Johnny Holt, and Willie Aiken were found guilty on April 24, 1942. A jury acquitted them of the more serious charge of inciting to riot, but found them guilty of unlawful assembly for an unlawful purpose, a misdemeanor punishable by up to two years in prison. Harris and Spriggs were each sentenced to 18 months in the county jail, while the other three were sentenced to 12 months in the county jail. The jury had recommended mercy for the Colt brothers, whereas Aiken was the only defendant who did not deny his guilt. The verdict shocked the public, which had been sympathetic to the mob. In June 1942, 2,000 people submitted a petition demanding the parole or pardon of those convicted. Harris, Spriggs, P.L. Holt, and Aiken were paroled on July 23, 1942. Johnny Holt was denied parole since he was the prime suspect in a robbery in California. He was paroled some time between then and 1943, and all six men were discharged from parole in September 1943. Winstead himself later pleaded guilty to assault with intent to commit rape and was sentenced to two and a half years to five years in prison. In February 1943, the Person County chapter of the NAACP petitioned for his parole, expressing doubt over Winstead's guilt. However, Winstead refused to apply for parole, finding the conditions to be too strict.

Nevertheless, Broughton resisted threats to segregation. In 1942, he urged African Americans not to start making demands at home as a result of World War II:

"Negroes are ill-advised if they take the position they are for victory in this war if something is to be done for them. Negroes should put their full energy into the war effort, for failure means slavery of the worst sort for white and Negro alike. The man or woman who uses this emergency as a means of stirring up strife between the races is not a friend to either race and is not a good American."

In 1943, Broughton wrote, "We believe in a policy of purity and high standard as to both races and we recognize the principle that race distinction does not imply race discrimination." He spurned criticism from the NAACP and claimed that racism had no impact on North Carolina's judicial system.

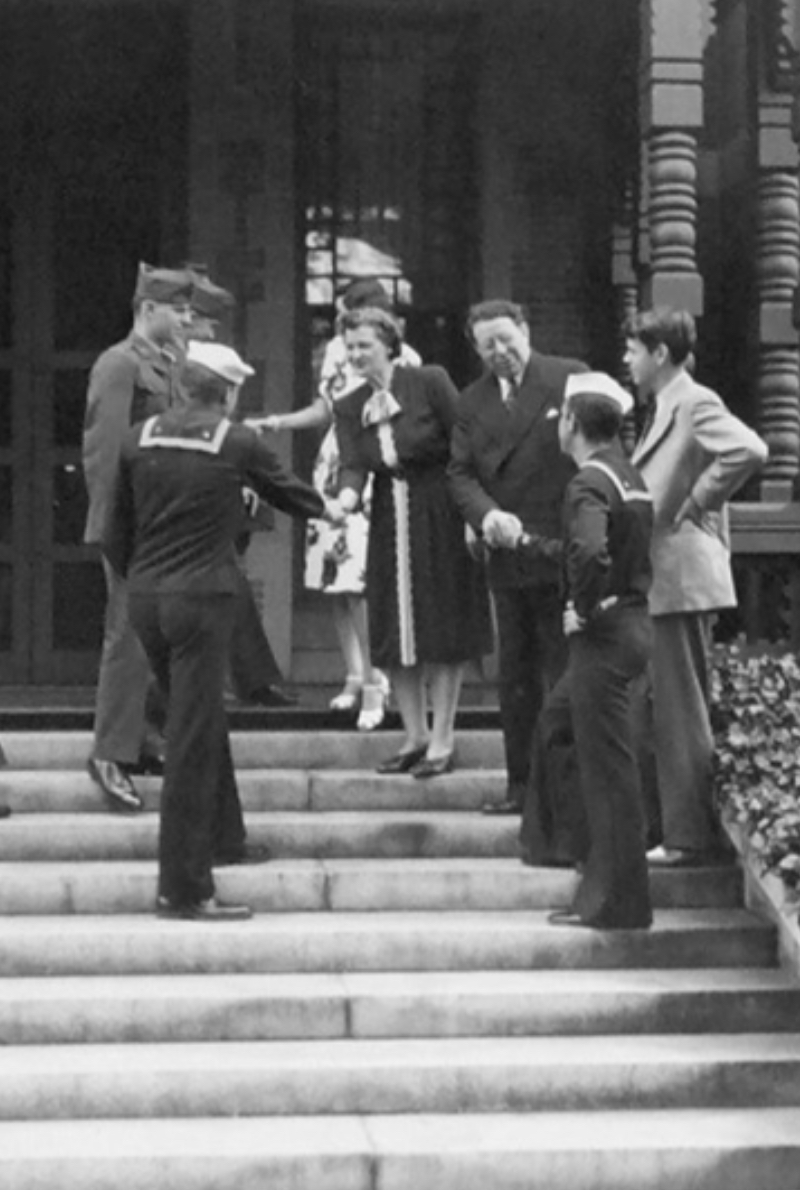
Governor Broughton and First Lady Broughton welcoming U.S. Servicemen to the North Carolina Executive Mansion in 1941.

Broughton was among twelve nominated at the 1944 Democratic National Convention to serve as Franklin D. Roosevelt's running mate in the presidential election that year.

== Tenure in Senate ==
In 1948, Broughton was elected to the United States Senate, after defeating William B. Umstead, an appointed incumbent, in the Democratic primary. In November, Broughton won both a special election to complete the Senate term and an election for a full term. He took office on December 31, 1948, but his service in the Senate was brief.

Appearing healthy, Broughton suddenly collapsed from a heart attack and died in Washington, D.C., on March 6, 1949. Governor W. Kerr Scott appointed Frank Porter Graham to fill his vacant office until the next election.

== Family ==
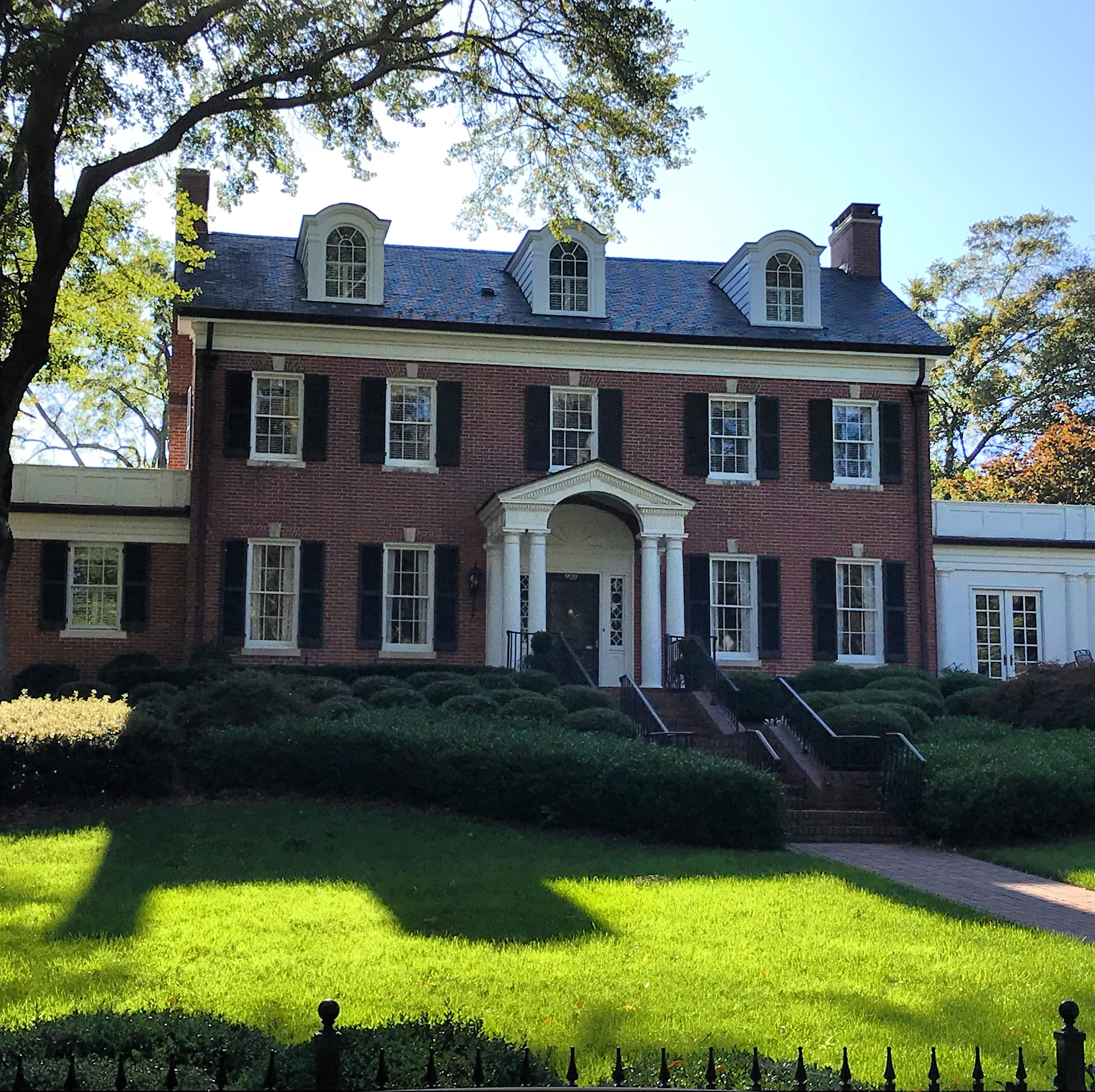
Broughton's residence in Raleigh

Joseph Melville Broughton, Jr. was the son of Joseph Melville Broughton and Sallie Harris. He married Alice Willson in 1916, they had four children. He was the nephew of Needham B. Broughton and a first cousin of Carrie Lougee Broughton. He was also a first cousin of medical doctor and Baptist minister Len G. Broughton. Broughton and his wife lived in the Jolly-Broughton House, a Georgian Revival mansion located in Raleigh's Hayes Barton Historic District, before and after living in the North Carolina Executive Mansion. He was interred at Montlawn Memorial Park in Raleigh.

== Legacy ==
In 1959, the State Hospital at Morganton for psychiatric patients was renamed Broughton Hospital in his memory. In addition, Broughton Hall at North Carolina State University was named in his honor.

He was a member of Civitan International.

== See also ==
- List of members of the United States Congress who died in office (1900–1949)

Party political offices
Preceded by Clyde R. Hoey	Democratic nominee for Governor of North Carolina; 1940	Succeeded by R. Gregg Cherry
Preceded by Josiah Bailey	Democratic nominee for U.S. Senator from North Carolina (Class 2); 1948	Succeeded by Willis Smith
Political offices
Preceded by Clyde R. Hoey	Governor of North Carolina; 1941–1945	Succeeded by R. Gregg Cherry
U.S. Senate
Preceded by William Bradley Umstead	U.S. senator (Class 2) from North Carolina; 1948–1949; Served alongside: Clyde Roark Hoey	Succeeded by Frank Porter Graham
