= Roanoke Park Historic District (Raleigh, North Carolina) =

Historic district in North Carolina, United States

- U.S. National Register of Historic Places
- U.S. Historic district
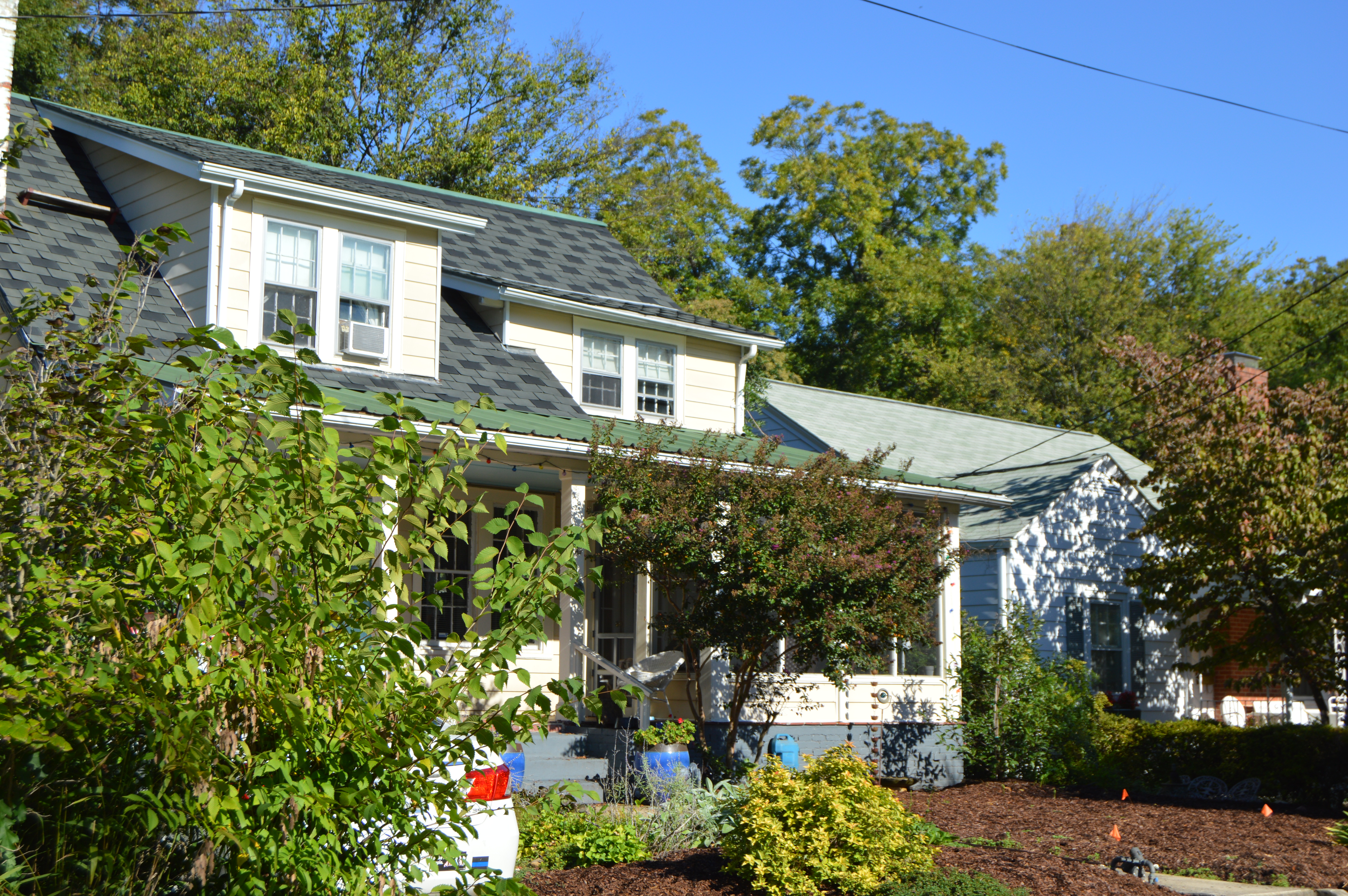
- Perry Street

- Location within North Carolina Location within the United States
- Location: Roughly bounded by Whitaker Mill Rd. Fairview Rd. Morrison Ave., Sunrise Ave. and Bickett Blvd., Raleigh, North Carolina
- Coordinates: 35°48′10″N 78°38′30″W
- Area: 107 acres (43 ha)
- Built by: Modern Homes Company
- Architectural style: Bungalow/craftsman, Greek Revival, et al.
- MPS: Five Points Neighborhoods, Raleigh, North Carolina MPS
- NRHP reference No.: 03000389
- Added to NRHP: May 9, 2003

The Roanoke Park Historic District a national historic district located at Raleigh, North Carolina. It is one of the city's historic Five Points neighborhoods and encompasses 446 contributing buildings and 1 contributing site. It is situated southeast of the Five Points intersection of Glenwood Avenue and Fairview and Whitaker Mill Roads. Roanoke Park is composed of six separate plats, filed from 1913 to 1926, and is roughly shaped like a diamond.

Architecturally, houses with American Craftsman detailing, such as bungalows and American Foursquares, constitute the majority of the neighborhood. However, some of the oldest houses in Five Points are located in Roanoke Park, and these homes employ more vernacular styles, including Greek Revival, side-gabled Triple-A cottages, and narrow shotgun houses, particularly along Sunrise Avenue.

Developers created the neighborhood's namesake Roanoke Park subdivision in 1922. Its promoters appealed to white first-time homebuyers and boasted about the suburb's location next to Hayes Barton, an upper-class neighborhood also in Five Points. This section of the neighborhood centers on a park and includes the largest period revival houses.

Roanoke Park was listed on the National Register of Historic Places in 2003 as a Historic District.

== See also ==
- Five Points Historic Neighborhoods (Raleigh, North Carolina)
- List of Registered Historic Places in North Carolina
