= Glenwood South =

- Interactive map of Glenwood South
- Coordinates: 35.78492603075522°N 78.64732996067102°W
- Country: United States
- State: North Carolina
- County: Wake
- City: Raleigh

Dimensions
  - Length: 21.2 km (13.2 mi)

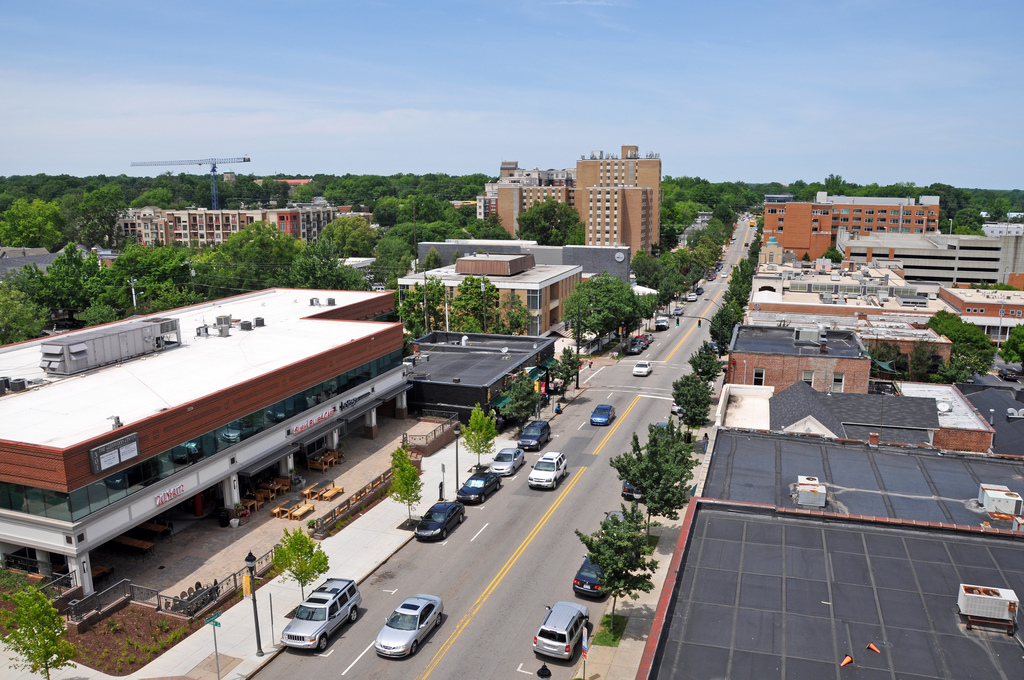
Glenwood South

Glenwood South is the Entertainment District in Downtown Raleigh, North Carolina, United States. Glenwood South is among the largest entertainment districts in North Carolina with a multitude of restaurants, clubs, and cafes. The district also has a retail and gallery presence.

== History ==
Glenwood Avenue was one of the first major thoroughfares which would lead to suburban expansion in the 1950s. It now runs from its origin at Morgan Street to Brier Creek, 13.2 miles (21.2 km) north-west. It was a minor nightlife hub in the city prior to the 2000s, but truly became the city's entertainment center throughout the 2000s.
