= Bloomsbury Historic District =

Historic district in North Carolina, United States

- U.S. National Register of Historic Places
- U.S. Historic district
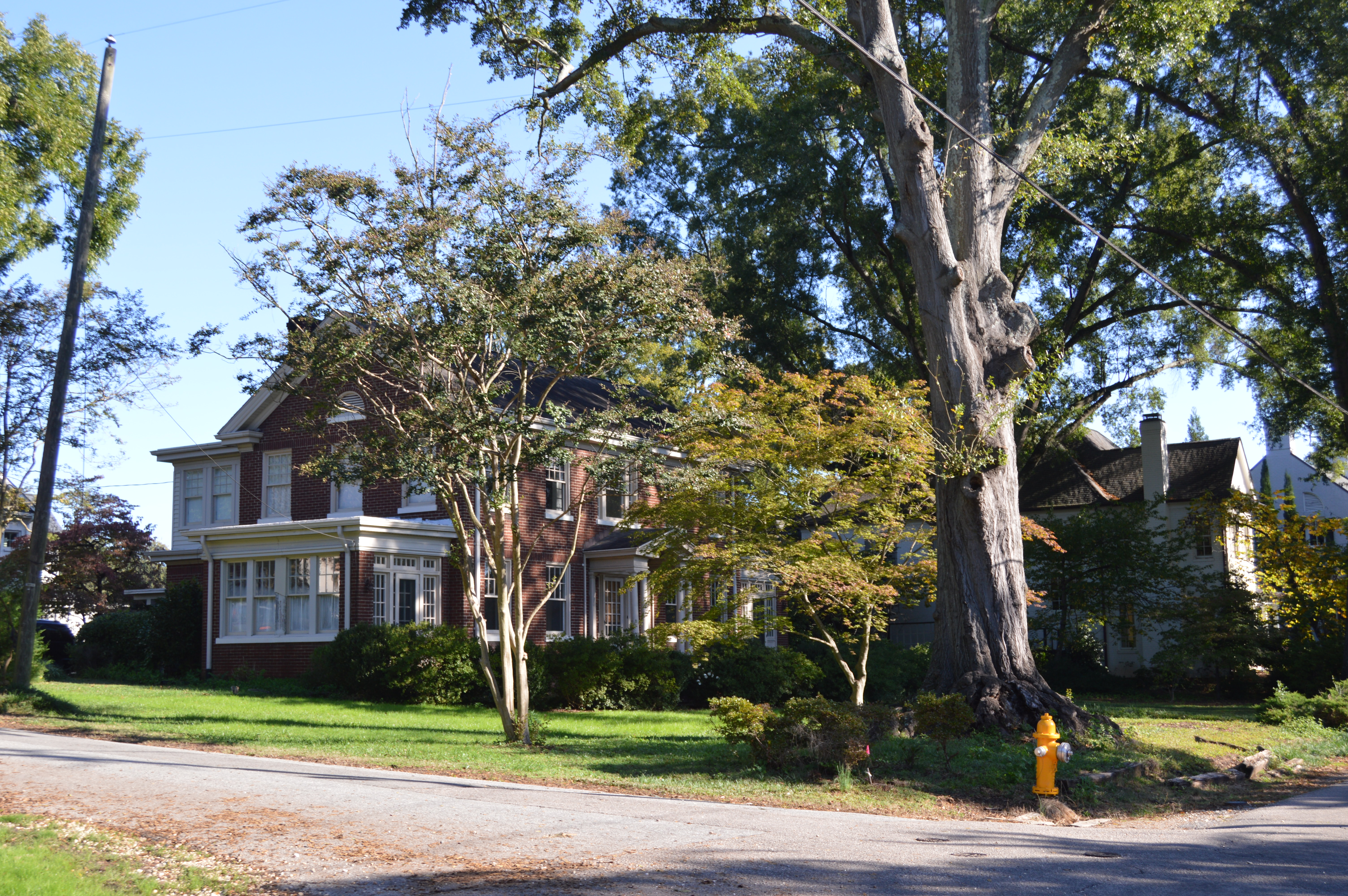
- Beechridge Road

- Location within North Carolina Location within the United States
- Location: Roughly bounded by Fairview Rd., St. Mary's St., Byrd St., Sunset Dr. and Whitaker Mill Rd., Raleigh, North Carolina
- Coordinates: 35°48′38″N 78°38′53″W
- Area: 120 acres (49 ha)
- Built: 1914
- Architect: Carolina Builders
- Architectural style: Bungalow/Craftsman, Tudor Revival
- MPS: Five Points Neighborhoods, Raleigh, North Carolina MPS
- NRHP reference No.: 02000497
- Added to NRHP: May 16, 2002

The Bloomsbury Historic District is a neighborhood and national historic district located near downtown Raleigh, North Carolina. Located north of the Five Points intersection, the boundaries include Fairview Road, St. Mary's Street, Byrd Street, Sunset Drive, and Whitaker Mill Road. The residential district encompasses 439 contributing buildings and was developed between about 1914 and 1950. It includes notable examples of Tudor Revival and Bungalow / American Craftsman style architecture.

In May 2002, Bloomsbury was listed on the National Register of Historic Places.

== See also ==
- Five Points Historic Neighborhoods (Raleigh, North Carolina)
- List of Registered Historic Places in North Carolina
