= Betsy Cochrane =

American politician

Betsy Lane Cochrane (née Lane; January 20, 1936) is an American retired politician from the state of North Carolina.

Cochrane was born in Asheboro, North Carolina in 1936, the daughter of William Jennings and Brodus Inez (née Campbell) Lane. She earned a degree in elementary education from Meredith College and worked as an educator. She married Joe Kenneth Cochrane and has two children.

Cochrane was elected as a Republican to the North Carolina House of Representatives in 1980, serving from 1981 to 1989, including stints as minority leader from 1985 to 1989, becoming the first woman to serve in the position. Cochrane was elected to the North Carolina Senate in 1988, serving the 38th district (Davie, Davidson, Rowan and Forsyth Counties) from 1989 to 2000. In 1993, she became the miniory whip, and in 1994, the first female Senate minority leader.
