= Joseph Harrell =

Joseph Harrell may refer to:

- Joey Harrell, American former professional basketball player, played college basketball for UNC Asheville
- Joseph Harrell, American college basketball player for the University of West Georgia
