= William Woods University =

Private university in Fulton, Missouri, US

- Other name: The Woods
- Former names: Female Orphan School (1870–1899); Daughters College (1899–1900); William Woods College (1900–1993)
- Motto: Amor Vincit Omnia
- Motto in English: Love Conquers All
- Type: Private university
- Established: 1870; 156 years ago
- Accreditation: HLC
- Endowment: $25 million (2021)
- President: Sarah Wisdom
- Provost: Caroline Boyer
- Students: 1,681
- Location: Fulton, Missouri, U.S. 38.8609°N 91.9485°W
- Campus: Rural
- Colors: Forest Green & Maroon
- Nickname: Owls
- Sporting affiliations: NAIA – Heart of America Athletic Conference
- Mascot: Screech the Owl
- Website: williamwoods.edu
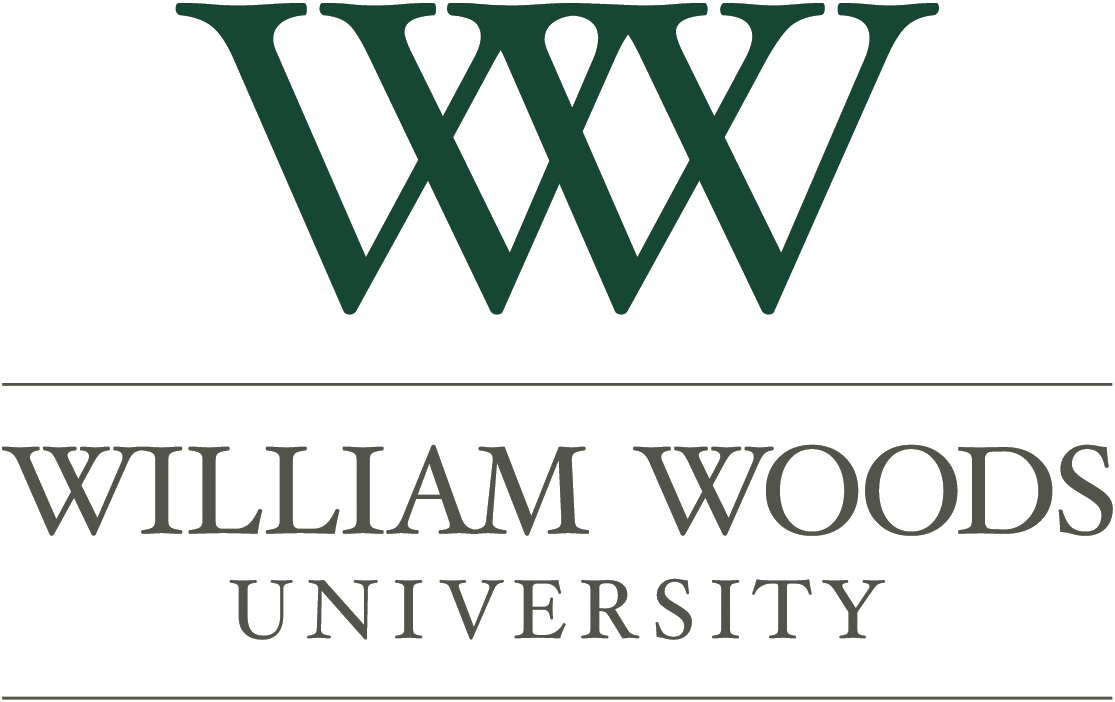

William Woods University is a private university in Fulton, Missouri, United States. Founded in 1870, the university is accredited by the Higher Learning Commission. Expanding its mission to address the need for graduate and adult-oriented programs, the institution became known as William Woods University in 1993. It began offering graduate degrees and admitting men as well as women into all of its programs. It enrolled 1,681 students in 2021.

== History ==
First known as the "Female Orphan School", the institution was founded in 1870 in Camden Point, Missouri, in response to the needs of girls who were orphaned during the American Civil War.

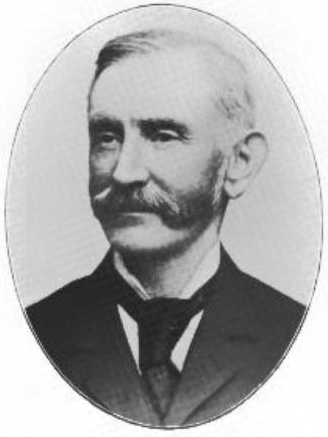
William Stone Woods was a major benefactor of the institution, later renamed after him

During the late nineteenth century, the institution moved to Fulton and expanded its elementary and secondary programs to accommodate young women who aspired to become teachers. Known briefly at the beginning of the twentieth century as "Daughters College", it changed its name to "William Woods College" in 1900 to honor a major benefactor (William S. Woods, president of the National Bank of Commerce) and began offering a two-year college program. In 1962, anticipating dramatic changes in the role of American women in the labor force, William Woods became a four-year college.

In 1952, future U.S. President Ronald Reagan gave a commencement address at the college in which he said that he "always thought of America as a place in the divine scheme of things that was set aside as a promised land." This is also a notable speech by the future president as it is one of his oldest surviving speeches.

In 1992, William Woods College changed its name to "William Woods University" and began offering graduate degree programs geared toward the working adult. The university also became coeducational by accepting male students in 1997.

== Campus ==
The campus in Fulton includes buildings of various types. Two favorites of the campus community are Dulany Auditorium and the William S. Woods Academic Building.

Dulany Auditorium was built in 1907. Mrs. D.M. Dulany contributed $7,500 toward construction of the $24,000 building in memory of her husband. The stained glass portrait windows are of D.M. Dulany, W.H. Dulany and Benjamin L. Locke, all early supporters of the college.

The William S. Woods Academic Building, or the Academic Building, as most students refer to it, is a three-story brick structure which houses administrative offices, classrooms and faculty. It was completed in 1921.

=== Rosa Parks Center ===
Rosa Parks Center, a Missouri Division of Youth Services (DYS) center for incarcerated girls, is a former university dormitory at WWU. It holds 10-12 girls at a time. WWU students are involved with the center. DYS and WWU agreed to the joint project in 2000, and the center opened in January 2001. The Rosa Parks Center is now the home for the newly announced Owl Football team, housing the coaching staff along with areas for student-athlete study and enrichment.

== Student life ==
William Woods offers approximately 40 student organizations, including co-curricular, honorary, religious/faith-based, service/leadership, and social/academic/special interest groups.

=== Greek life ===
William Woods is home to three fraternities and four sororities.

=== KWWU-LP student-run radio ===
KWWU-LP (94.9 FM, "The Pulse") is a low-power, student-run radio station broadcasting from the WWU campus. Licensed to the university, the station went on the air on August 25, 2003. The station's transmitter has an effective radiated power of 47 watts with a coverage area of about 3-5 miles, depending on the terrain and other factors.

KWWU is operated as part of WWU's undergraduate communication programs, offering students the opportunity to serve as disc jockeys and assist in the station's management. The station has also been streaming via the internet since 2011.

== Athletics ==
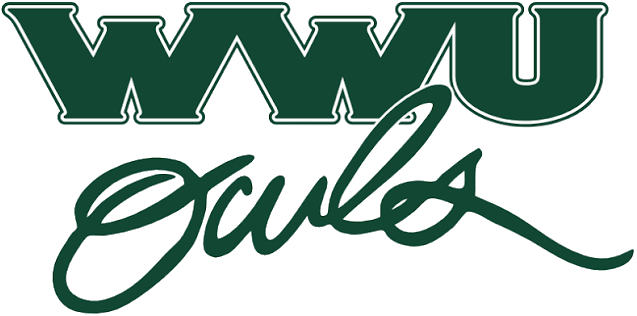
WWU athletics logo

The William Woods athletic teams are the Owls. The university is a member of the National Association of Intercollegiate Athletics (NAIA), primarily competing in the American Midwest Conference (AMC) since the 1993–94 academic year.

William Woods competes in 22 intercollegiate varsity sports: Men's sports include baseball, basketball, cross country, football, golf, soccer, tennis, track & field and wrestling; while women's sports include basketball, cross country, flag football, golf, soccer, softball, tennis, lacrosse, track & field, volleyball and wrestling; and co-ed sports include competitive cheerleading, competitive dance, and outdoor life sports.

On July 24, 2023, the school announced it would join the Heart of America Athletic Conference in 2024 as an associate member for football. It will become a full member of the Heart of America in 2025.

== Alumni and traditions ==
William Woods has more than 25,000 alumni. There are many traditions associated with the school, including the "Ivy Chain." The Ivy Ceremony marks the start of the students' college life. When they graduate, the ivy will be cut during another ceremony, held at commencement, symbolizing separation from college and the beginning of a new life. The tradition is believed to have begun more than a hundred years ago when the Class of 1899 planted ivy on the campus during a special graduation ceremony.

=== Notable alumni ===
- Carol Bartz, businessperson
- Amber Cox, sports executive
- Dan Lanning, college football coach
- Jan Meyers, politician
- Brad Pollitt, politician
- Luann Ridgeway, politician
- Aimee Sapp, president of Meredith College and former WWU provost and faculty member
- Helen Stephens, Olympic track and field athlete
- Kuo Su-Chun, politician
