= Aimee Sapp =

Aimee Diane Walker Sapp is an American academic administrator and president of Meredith College. She previously served as the provost of William Woods University from 2013 to 2024.

== Life ==
Sapp earned a B.S. in sociology from William Woods College. She completed a master's degree in speech communication from the University of Northern Colorado. Sapp received a Ph.D. in communication from the University of Missouri. Her 2002 dissertation was titled, The Impact of Innovative Technology on Students' Communication Behavior and Perceptions of Teacher Immediacy. Michael W. Kramer was her doctoral advisor.

In 1998, Sapp joined William Woods University as an assistant professor of communication. She was promoted to full professor and, in 2013, became the provost and chief academic officer. In March 2024, she was announced as the incoming ninth president of Meredith College, succeeding Jo Allen.
