= Margaret Arlen =

American talk show host

Margaret Hollowell Hines (June 30, 1916 – April 24, 2000), known professionally as Margaret Arlen, was an American talk show host on radio and television.

== Early years ==
Arlen was born Eleanor Hines in Edenton, North Carolina and grew up in Manteo, North Carolina. Her father, Hugh Hines, was a Baptist minister, and her mother, Dixie, was a teacher. As a child, Arlen focused her time and attention on reading and studying. She skipped two grades in elementary school and graduated from high school when she was 15 years old. She attended Mars Hill College and graduated from Meredith College in 1936.

== Career ==
After Arlen finished college, she was a secretary at WGBR radio in Goldsboro, North Carolina. She began her on-air career as a women's commentator there. That experience led her becoming director of women's activities at WPTF in Raleigh, North Carolina, and after a year in that position she became program director at WRAL, also in Raleigh. In 1943, she moved to New York City. She wrote promotional and public-service announcements for the Blue Network while she awaited an opportunity to go on the air again. In 1943, she was hired to be women's commentator at WCBS (which then used the call letters WABC) and was given the name Margaret Arlen (a name that the station owned).

== Margaret Arlen Show ==
The Margaret Arlen Show was created after Adelaide Hawley left WCBS to go to another station in New York City, taking her name recognition with her. WCBS officials created the name Margaret Arlen, which would belong to the station rather than to a person. Arlen stepped into the title role, supported by a director, an announcer, two writers, and two assistants. She was selected because of her background, her voice, and her photogenic quality. Arlen's involvement with the community extended beyond the studio as she spoke to civic groups and participated in benefits and other public activities.

The Margaret Arlen Show ran from 8:30 to 9 a.m. Mondays through Saturdays. She and the announcer interviewed guests on a variety of topics. Her broadcasts included promotional activities to help with the American effort in World War II. Among those activities was recruitment of enlistees for the Women's Army Corps to form a special company of medical and surgical technicians. The promotion resulted in 1475 applications in one month, with 452 of the women being inducted. In one Easter season during the war, Arlen's listeners sent in 5244 Easter eggs for distribution to military personnel. Her October 1945 solicitation of savings stamps to help bedridden soldiers brought in millions of stamps, with contributions still arriving at WCBS in July 1946.

The radio version of the Margaret Arlen Show ended in 1952. By then, the program was on WCBS-TV five times a week. Arlen was producer-director of the program in addition to her on-camera work. A review in the trade publication Billboard described the TV show as "currently one of the better female chatter AM programs". It noted that Arlen described how to use a fallout shelter "with a minimum of confusion but a maximum of clarity".

In 1953, Arlen received a Zenith Award "for outstanding public service programming".

== Personal life ==
In 1937, Arlen married Thomas Archibald Early Jr. in Manteo. They divorced by 1950. In 1957, she married Charles Hayden Griffiths in New York City. Hines died in Sanford, North Carolina, aged 83.
