= Baptist State Convention of North Carolina =

Baptist church association in North Carolina

The Baptist State Convention of North Carolina (BSCNC) is an autonomous association of Baptist churches in the state of North Carolina. It is one of the state conventions associated with the Southern Baptist Convention. Headquartered in Cary, North Carolina, the convention is made up of 80 Baptist associations as of 2025.

The convention is led by three officers, elected annually during the annual meeting of the convention. The convention is also led by an Executive Director-Treasurer (EDT). In 2025, the current EDT is Rev. Todd Unzicker, who was elected by the convention in May 2021.

== History ==
The convention was founded on March 26, 1830, in Greenville. Two of its thirteen founders were Thomas Meredith, who also helped to draft its constitution, and Samuel Wait, future first president of Wake Forest University.

In 1832, the convention established its newspaper, originally a monthly paper called the Interpreter edited by Meredith, but which in 1835 changed to a weekly paper entitled the Biblical Recorder. It was later to be merged with the Southern Watchman, to become the Recorder and Watchman. Also in 1832, the convention resolved to purchase a farm "for the establishment of a Baptist Literary Institution on the Manual Labor Principle". A committee, comprising J.G. Hall, W.R. Hinton, J. Purify, A.S. Wynn, and S. J. Jeffreys was formed to raise USD2,000 for its purchase. This institution was named Wake Forest Institute, which began operation on 1834-02-01, initially serving 25 students. In 1839, this was renamed to Wake Forest College.

The convention acquired Buies Creek Academy in 1925. It still owned it when, in 1979 it became Campbell University.

In 1975, after extensive and vigorous discussion, the BSCNC adopted the following resolution, that contributed to it having more women deacons than any other state in the South, apart from Virginia, by 2005:

Whereas "There is neither Jew nor Greek, there is neither bond nor free, there is neither male or female; for ye are all one in Jesus Christ (Gal. 3:28);

Whereas it is the right and responsibility of all Christians to witness in God's name through proclaiming the Word, offering physical and spiritual comfort to those in need, and engagin in constructive participation in a Christian church;

Whereas the New Testament cites several examples ... of women who responded to God's call with devoted service;

Whereas women today are still dedicating their lived to the Lord;

Therefore be it resolved that the Baptist State Convention in annual session, November 10–12, 1975, recognizing the freedom of conscience in the believer, affirms the right of all Christian women to follow God's will in their lives, including those whose call leads to ordination and professional ministry.

— Baptist State Convention of North Carolina

== Today ==
As of 2000, there were 3,717 Southern Baptist congregations in North Carolina, with 1,512,058 adherents. Agencies included Provision Financial Resources, which manages the funds of individuals and organizations, and the Biblical Recorder newspaper, which it purchased in 1930.

== Affiliated institutions ==
In 2007, the executive committee and Board of Directors of the Convention affirmed a proposal to create a new relationship between the convention and the five affiliated schools. Messengers approved the proposal at the 2007 annual meeting and gave final approval in 2008, thus allowing the schools to elect all their trustees annually. Direct financial support from the convention was phased out over a four-year period, and the five schools then entered into a mutually voluntary partnership.

- Campbell University
- Chowan University
- Gardner-Webb University
- Mars Hill College
- Wingate University

The Baptist State Convention also recognizes a historical relationship with the historic educational institutions based on its founding of Wake Forest University, in 1834 and Meredith College in 1898. These institutions do not receive funding from the convention, nor are their boards and administration members elected by the convention. They simply acknowledge a historical relationship with their founding body, the Baptist State Convention of North Carolina.

== Affiliated organizations ==
- Baptist Children's Homes of North Carolina
- North Carolina Baptist Foundation
- North Carolina Baptist Hospital
- Fruitland Baptist Bible College

== Retreat centers ==
- Caraway Conference Center and Camp
- North Carolina Baptist Assembly at Fort Caswell
- Truett Camp
