= Thomas C. Parramore =

American historian

Thomas Custis Parramore
- Born: 1932; Winton, North Carolina
- Died: January 13, 2004; Wake County, North Carolina
- Education: Bachelor of Arts, AM, and PhD
- Alma mater: University of North Carolina at Chapel Hill
- Occupations: Professor, historian
- Spouse: Barbara Mitchell Parramore
- Children: Lisa Gray Parramore, Lynn Stuart Parramore, PhD.
- Writing career
- Genre: History
- Subject: North Carolina

Dr. Thomas Custis Parramore (1932 – January 13, 2004) was a Professor Emeritus of History at Meredith College, retiring in 1992 as well as a prominent author on the subject of North Carolina history and the recipient of numerous historical association awards. He was elected as member of the North Carolinana Society recognizing his "adjudged performance" in support of North Carolina's historical, literature, and culture.

== Education ==
A native of Winton, North Carolina, and a graduate of Ahoskie High School. Parramore held three degrees: a bachelor's, a master's and a doctoral degree in English history from the University of North Carolina at Chapel Hill.

== Career ==
He taught history at Meredith College for 30 years and retired from teaching in 1992.

== Awards ==
- James Harvey Robinson Award from the American Historical Association
- Special Book Award from the Society of North Carolina Historians
- Pauline Davis Perry Award for Excellence in Research and Writing at Meredith College
- Meredith College Distinguished Faculty Lecture, 1977

== Publications ==
Parramore wrote extensively on the history of North Carolina and surrounding area. His publications include:

- Parramore, Thomas C. (1967). Cradle of the Colony: The History of Chowan County and Edenton, North Carolina. Chowan County, North Carolina: Edenton Chamber of Commerce.
- Parramore, Thomas C. (1969). The Ancient Maritime Village of Murfreesborough: 1787-1825. Murfreesboro, North Carolina: Johnson Publishing Company. ISBN 0-930230-02-7.
- Parramore, Thomas C.; Parramore, Barbara M. (1973). Did the American revolution begin in North Carolina?: A history lesson. Raleigh, North Carolina: Office of Publications, School of Education, North Carolina State University. OCLC 2715884.
- Launching the Craft; The First Half-Century of Freemasonry in North Carolina; Grand Lodge of North Carolina; 1975 Raleigh, NC
- Parramore, Thomas C. (1978). Southampton County Virginia. Published for the Southampton County Historical Society by the University Press of Virginia. ISBN 0-8139-0754-3.
- Parramore, Thomas C. (June 1983). Express Lanes and Country Roads: The Way We Lived in North Carolina, 1920-1970. The University of North Carolina Press. ISBN 0-8078-1553-5.
- Parramore, Thomas C.; Wilms, Douglas C. (January 1983). North Carolina: The History of an American State. Englewood Cliffs, New Jersey: Prentice Hall. ISBN 0-13-623629-4.
- Parramore, Thomas C.; Parramore, Barbara M. (1984). Looking for the "Lost Colony". Raleigh, North Carolina: Tanglewood Press. ISBN 0-318-03650-9.
- Parramore, Thomas C. (November 22, 1993). Triumph at Kitty Hawk: The Wright Brothers and Powered Flight. Raleigh, North Carolina: Division of Archives and History, North Carolina Department of Cultural Resources. ISBN 0-86526-259-4.
- Parramore, Thomas C.; Stewart, Peter C.; Bogger, Tommy L. (1994). Norfolk: the First Four Centuries. Charlottesville, Virginia: University of Virginia Press. ISBN 0-8139-1557-0.
- Parramore, Thomas C. (1998). Trial Separation: Murfreesboro, North Carolina and the Civil War. Murfreesboro, North Carolina: Murfreesboro Historical Association, Inc. p. 10. LCCN 00503566.
- Parramore, Thomas C; Stewart, Peter C.; Bogger, Tommy L. (April 2000). Norfolk: The First Four Centuries. University of Virginia Press. ISBN 0-8139-1988-6.
- Parramore, Thomas C. (2001). Murfreesboro, North Carolina and the Founding of the American Republic 1608-1871. Murfreesboro, North Carolina: Murfreesboro Historical Association, Inc.
- Parramore, Thomas C. (2002). First to Fly: North Carolina and the Beginnings of Aviation. The University of North Carolina Press. ISBN 0-8078-5470-0. "Thomas C Parramore."
- Parramore, Thomas C. (2003). Murfreesboro, North Carolina: Cradle of Titans 1810-1824. Murfreesboro, North Carolina: Murfreesboro Historical Association, Inc.
