= Asheville Regional Airport =

Airport located in Fletcher, North Carolina, USA

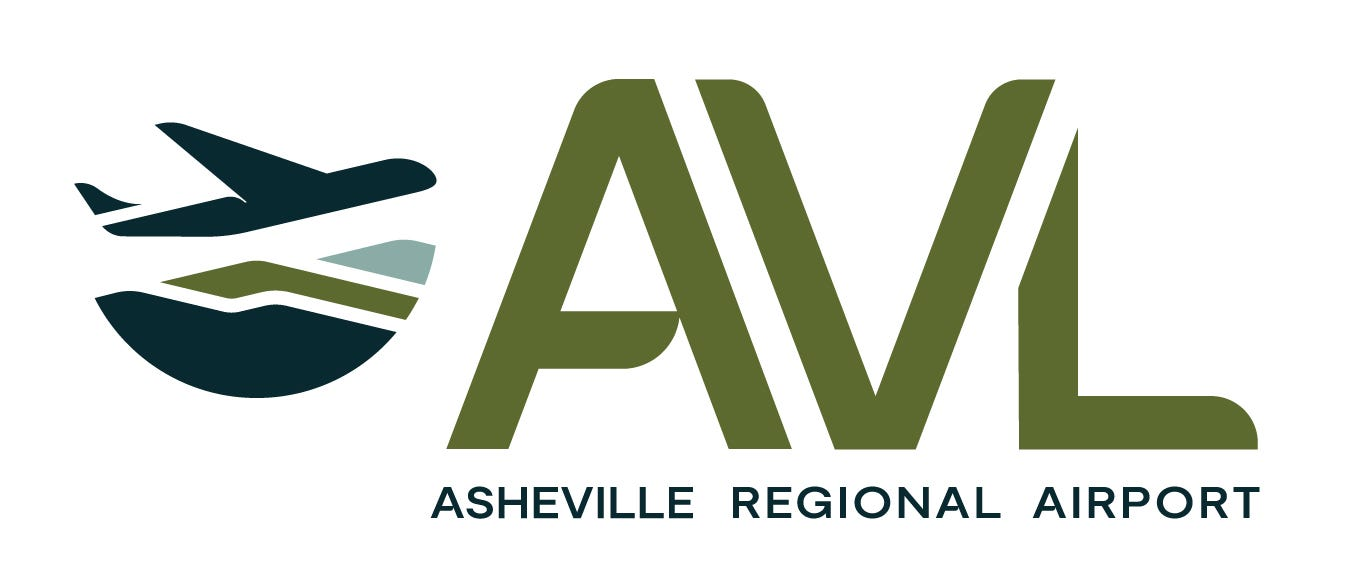
- IATA: AVL; ICAO: KAVL; FAA LID: AVL; WMO: 72315

Summary
- Airport type: Public
- Owner: City of Asheville
- Operator: Asheville Regional Airport Authority
- Serves: Asheville, North Carolina
- Location: Asheville, North Carolina
- Opened: 1961
- Operating base for: Allegiant Air
- Elevation AMSL: 2,164 ft (660 m)
- Coordinates: 35°26′10″N 082°32′30″W
- Website: flyavl.com

Maps
- FAA airport diagram
- Interactive map of Asheville Regional Airport

Runways
| Direction | Length | | Surface |
| Direction | ft | m | Surface |
|---|---|---|---|
| 17/35 | 8,002 | 2,439 | Asphalt |

Statistics
- Aircraft operations (2025): 73,526
- Passenger volume (2025): 2,240,877
- Source: Federal Aviation Administration, BTS

Asheville Regional Airport (IATA: AVL, ICAO: KAVL, FAA LID: AVL) is a Class C airport near the town of Fletcher, North Carolina, 9 miles (14 km) south of downtown Asheville. It is owned by the Greater Asheville Regional Airport Authority. The Federal Aviation Administration (FAA) National Plan of Integrated Airport Systems for 2019–2023 categorized it as a small-hub primary commercial service facility. As of 2026, the airport is the third-busiest in North Carolina. In 2023 it served an all-time record number of passengers for the airport, 2,246,411, an increase of 22.2% over 2022. Between 2016 and 2026, air carrier operations at the airport increased by more than 300 percent.

The airport opened initially with a 6500-foot runway in 1961, replacing the former airport at 35.439°N 82.481°W.

Asheville is a focus city for Allegiant Air, which bases Airbus A320 family aircraft and crew at the airport.

== History ==
=== Original airport ===
Asheville & Henderson Airport was opened in 1943 and initially operated by the U.S. Army Corps of Engineers. In 1948, Capital Airlines, Delta Air Lines and Piedmont Airlines served the former Asheville airport, all with Douglas DC-3s. Capital flew nonstop to Charlotte and Knoxville; Delta flew nonstop to Greenville, SC, and Knoxville; Piedmont flew nonstop to Tri-Cities, TN and Charlotte.

=== Replacement ===
In 1959, the Asheville City Council purchased property partially located in neighboring Henderson County for the development of the airport. The North Carolina General Assembly passed a bill realigning the boundaries of Buncombe and Henderson to include the proposed airport property entirely in Buncombe, allowing Asheville to annex the site. The new airport opened in January 1961. The terminal building opened on June 7, 1961.

In 1961, Capital Airlines flew Vickers Viscounts into the recently opened new airport with nonstop service to Atlanta, Tri-Cities, TN and Winston/Salem. Capital was acquired by and merged into United Airlines which in 1963 flew Viscounts and Douglas DC-6Bs nonstop to Atlanta, Greensboro, Raleigh/Durham and Washington D.C. National Airport. In 1966 Delta had one daily flight from Asheville, a Douglas DC-7 nonstop to Knoxville and direct to Louisville and Chicago O'Hare Airport. In 1966 Piedmont Fairchild F-27s and Martin 4-0-4s flew nonstop to Atlanta, Charlotte, Knoxville, Roanoke and Tri-Cities, TN.

Piedmont Airlines introduced Boeing 727-100s in 1967, a typical routing being Atlanta - Asheville - Winston/Salem - Roanoke - New York LaGuardia Airport. In 1969 United Boeing 737-200s flew nonstop to Atlanta and Raleigh/Durham while Delta McDonnell Douglas DC-9-30s flew nonstop to Knoxville with same plane service to Louisville and Chicago O'Hare Airport.

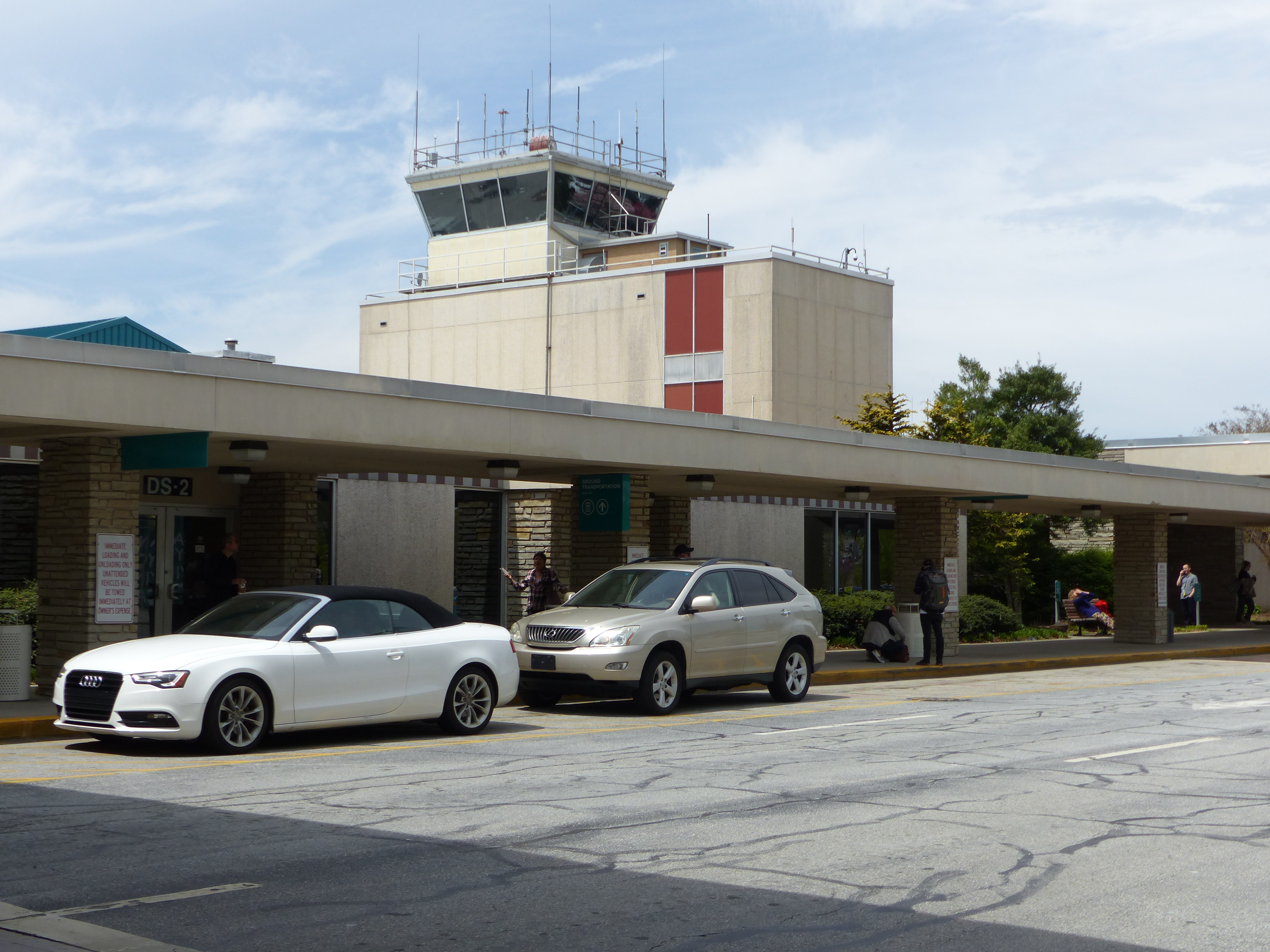
The front of the terminal and the control tower before the current renovation

The April 1975 Official Airline Guide listed Delta, Piedmont and United serving Asheville. By February 1985, Piedmont was the only remaining jet airline at Asheville, with Boeing 727-200 and Fokker F28 Fellowship nonstops from Atlanta, Baltimore, Charlotte and Roanoke and one-stop 727s from Denver, Miami and New York LaGuardia Airport, plus one-stop F28s from New York Newark Airport according to the Official Airline Guide.

American Eagle began serving AVL from Nashville in 1986 and Raleigh-Durham using BAe Jetstream 31s and Saab 340s in 1987. These flights ended in 1995 when American closed both hubs.

A Concorde supersonic transport (SST) visited AVL during a 1987 promotional tour and was snowed in overnight. Chartered Boeing 747s (operated by United Airlines) have visited, as has an Airbus A340 during the visit of Charles, Prince of Wales, to the nearby Biltmore Estate in 1996.

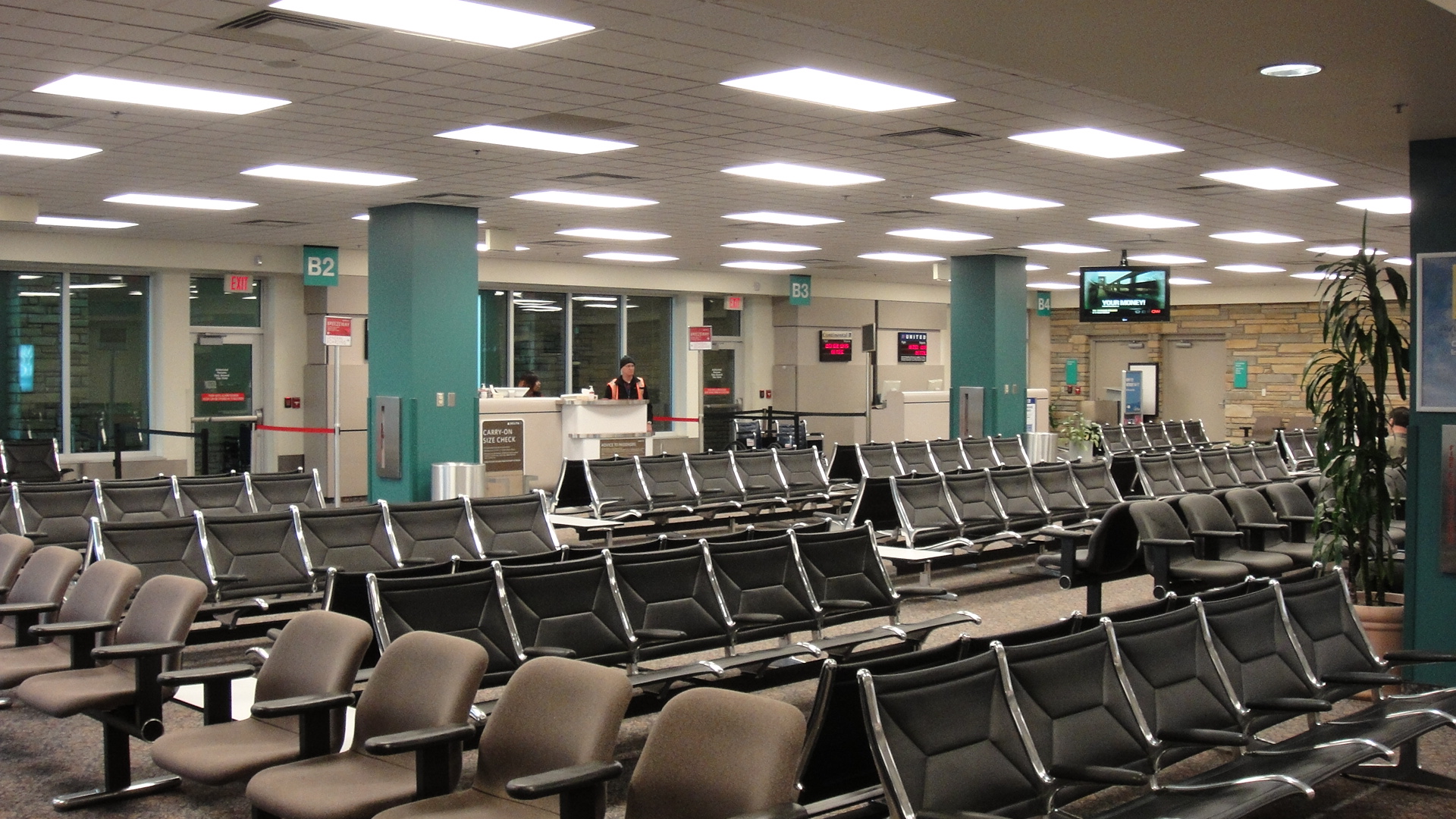
Terminal waiting area

The April 1995 OAG listed six airlines at Asheville: American Eagle, Delta, Delta Connection (operated by both Atlantic Southeast Airlines (ASA) and Comair), USAir (which had merged with Piedmont in 1989) and USAir Express. Delta and Delta Connection (ASA) had a total of eight nonstops a day from Atlanta, Delta on McDonnell Douglas MD-80s and Delta Connection on ATR 72s and Embraer EMB-120 Brasilias. Delta Connection (operated by Comair) also had three EMB-120 Brasilias a day from Cincinnati, a Delta hub. USAir and USAir Express had a total of nine nonstops a day from the USAir hub in Charlotte, USAir with Boeing 737-300s and McDonnell Douglas DC-9-30s and USAir Express with Short 360s. USAir Express also had three nonstop Jetstream 31s a day from Raleigh/Durham, some stopping in Greenville/Spartanburg. Delta ended mainline flights to AVL in December 1995, with ASA taking over with British Aerospace 146 regional jets; however, Delta currently operates mainline Boeing 717-200 service nonstop to its Atlanta hub.

In 1996, Midway Airlines briefly flew to its hub at Raleigh-Durham via Midway Connection partner Corporate Airlines Jetstream 31s.

In April 2010, President Barack Obama and First Lady Michelle Obama flew to Asheville aboard a Boeing C-32 for a weekend getaway. In October 2011, President Obama landed in Asheville in the larger Boeing VC-25 to kick off his North Carolina and Virginia bus tour promoting his jobs bill. He gave a speech at the airport, and cited potential enhancements at the airport as part of the jobs push. President Obama returned to Asheville on February 13, 2013, on the same aircraft for a brief visit and speech at a nearby manufacturing facility.

In 2012, Asheville began a major airport improvement project, which started with bringing the runway up to FAA standards. In December 2015, a temporary runway was opened west of the existing runway (16/34). The new runway entered service on November 5, 2020.

=== 2023 expansion ===
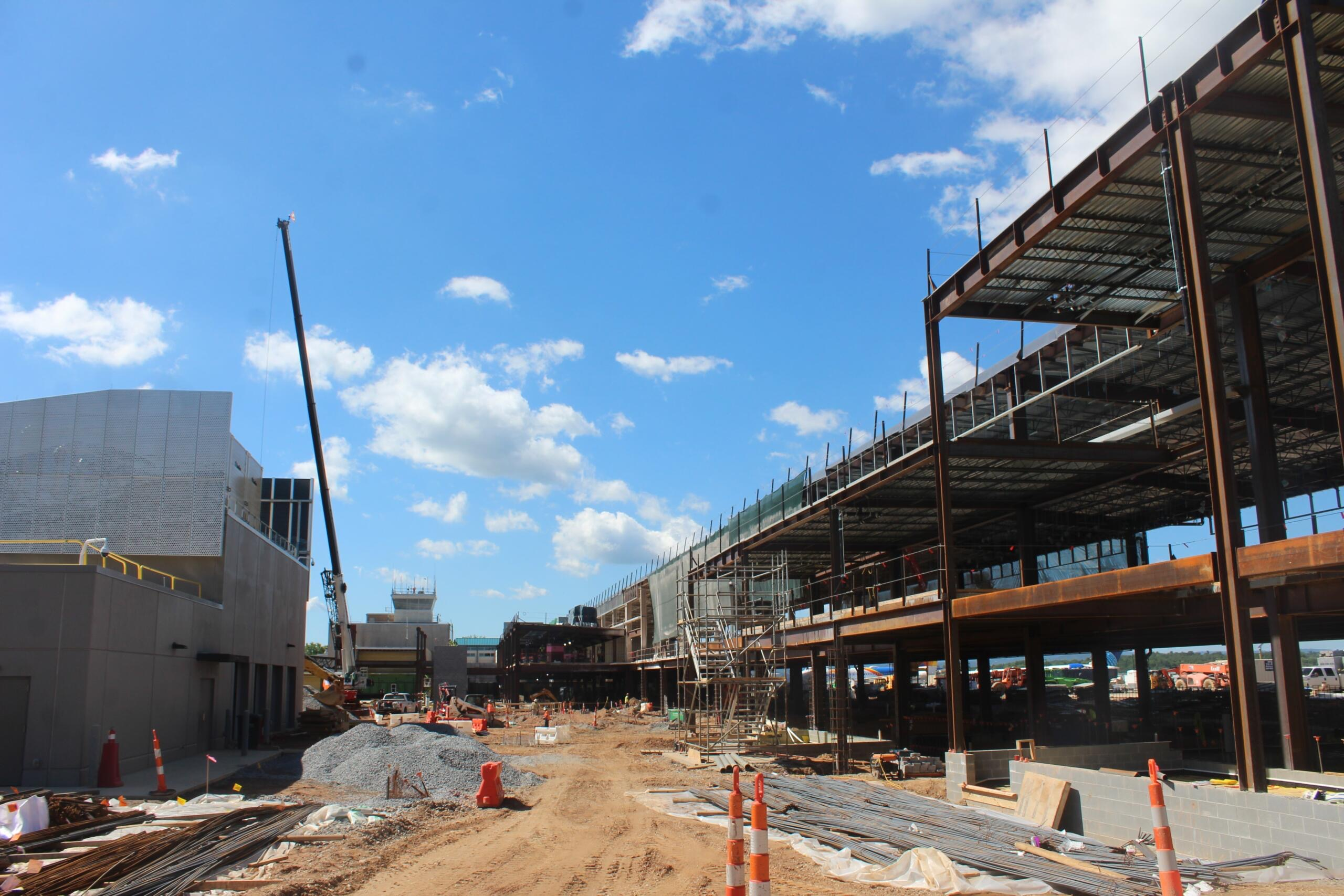
Terminal expansion construction with the original 1960s era ATC tower in the background

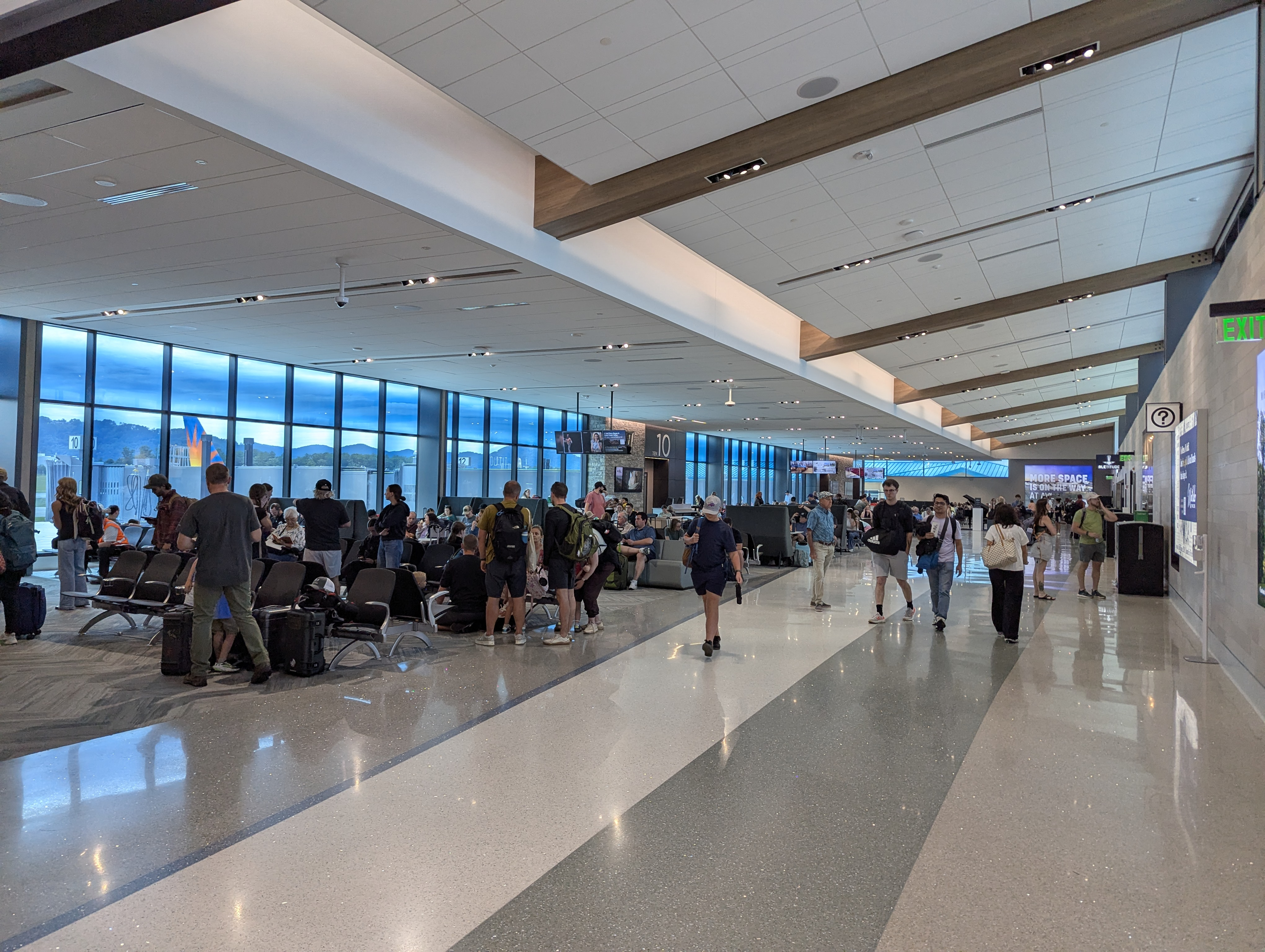
View of the new terminal in 2026, showing gates 10 through 12

In 2023, the airport began work on a multi-phase renovation and expansion of the terminal building. Once the construction work is finished the terminal will be 150% larger than the current space with 12 rather than seven gates. It will be two-story rather than single story when complete. Construction on the new $55 million, 127-foot (39 m) air traffic control tower began in 2023 and was completed in summer 2026. 175 million dollars in bonds was approved by the state treasurer for the project. The total cost of the project has been cited as $400 million. Jet bridges will be added as part of the project as currently manual ramps are pushed up to the planes during the renovation.

== Facilities ==
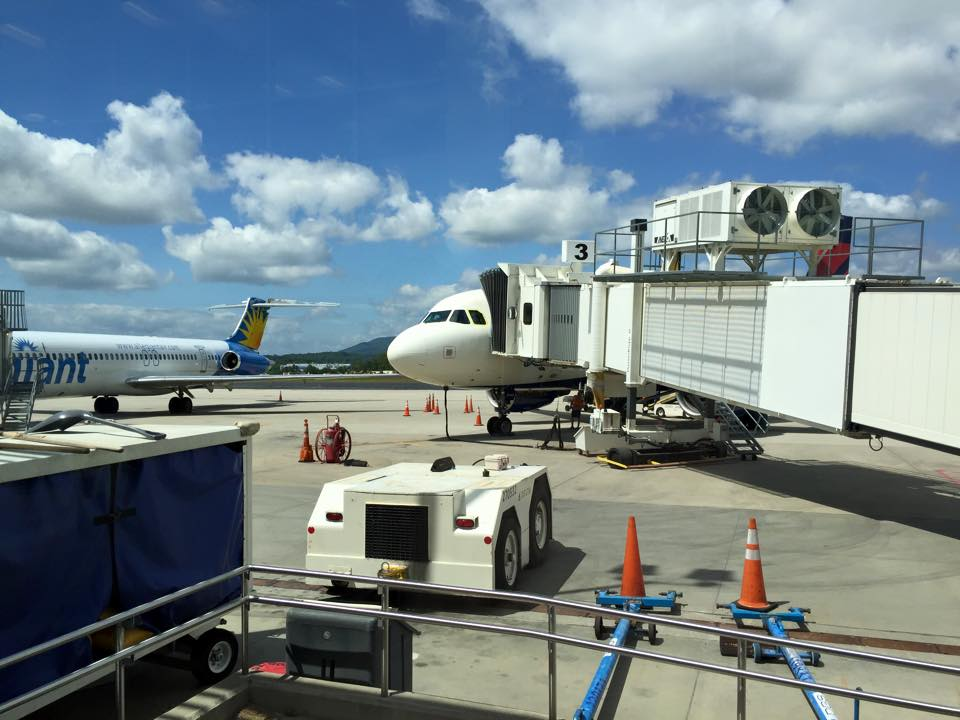
An Allegiant Air MD-83 and Delta Air Lines Airbus A319 at Asheville

Asheville Regional Airport covers 900 acres (360 ha) and has one asphalt runway measuring 8,002 ft × 150 ft (2,439 m × 46 m).

The terminal building opened on June 7, 1961. A $20 million expansion and renovation project began in 1987. The expansion project was completed in 1992, which resulted in an expansion of the ticket lobby, baggage claim area, and administrative office space. A second-level boarding area and jetways were constructed, as well as an atrium to the existing lobby. The second-level boarding area was removed and the ground-level boarding areas were expanded and renovated in 2003. In 2009, $17.8 million of improvements were completed, including a guest services center, an additional baggage carousel, rental car desks, offices and security enhancements. In November 2017, a new 1,300-space parking deck opened in front of the airport terminal.

The airport began working on another expansion in 2023.

== Airlines and destinations ==
| Airlines | Destinations | Refs |
|---|---|---|
| Allegiant Air | Boston, Fort Lauderdale, Key West, Minneapolis/St. Paul (resumes May 28, 2027), Newark, Orlando, Orlando/Sanford, Punta Gorda (FL), St. Petersburg/Clearwater, Sarasota, Washington–Dulles, West Palm Beach; Seasonal: Austin, Destin/Fort Walton Beach, Denver | |
| American Airlines | Charlotte, Dallas/Fort Worth; Seasonal: Miami | |
| American Eagle | Charlotte, Chicago–O'Hare, Dallas/Fort Worth, New York–LaGuardia, Philadelphia, Washington–National; Seasonal: Miami | |
| Delta Air Lines | Atlanta; Seasonal: Minneapolis/St. Paul | |
| Delta Connection | Atlanta, New York–LaGuardia; Seasonal: Boston | |
| Sun Country Airlines | Chicago–O'Hare (begins May 28, 2027) | |
| United Express | Chicago–O'Hare, Denver, Newark | |

== Statistics ==
=== Annual traffic ===
AVL Airport Annual Traffic 2009–Present
| Year | Passengers | % Change | Year | Passengers | % Change |
|---|---|---|---|---|---|
| 2009 | 579,443 | — | 2019 | 1,616,762 | ▲42.5% |
| 2010 | 735,760 | ▲27.0% | 2020 | 704,972 | ▼56.4% |
| 2011 | 721,677 | ▼1.9% | 2021 | 1,428,266 | ▲102.6% |
| 2012 | 633,848 | ▼12.2% | 2022 | 1,838,793 | ▲28.7% |
| 2013 | 678,023 | ▲7.0% | 2023 | 2,246,411 | ▲22.2% |
| 2014 | 756,425 | ▲11.6% | 2024 | 2,174,125 | ▼3.2% |
| 2015 | 787,135 | ▲4.0% | 2025 | 2,240,877 | ▲3.1% |
| 2016 | 826,648 | ▲5.0% | 2026 | | |
| 2017 | 956,634 | ▲15.7% | 2027 | | |
| 2018 | 1,134,568 | ▲18.6% | 2028 | | |

=== Carrier shares ===
Airline Market Shares (September 2025 – August 2026)
| Rank | Airline | Passengers | Market Share |
|---|---|---|---|
| 1 | Allegiant | 900,000 | 40.17% |
| 2 | Delta | 379,000 | 16.91% |
| 3 | Piedmont | 163,000 | 7.26% |
| 4 | American | 156,000 | 6.97% |
| 5 | Envoy | 134,000 | 6.00% |
| | Other Airlines | 508,000 | 22.69% |

=== Top destinations ===
Busiest domestic routes from AVL (September 2025 – August 2026)
| Rank | City | Passengers | Carriers |
|---|---|---|---|
| 1 | Atlanta, Georgia | 214,050 | Delta |
| 2 | Charlotte, North Carolina | 111,390 | American |
| 3 | Fort Lauderdale, Florida | 100,650 | Allegiant |
| 4 | Chicago–O'Hare, Illinois | 90,590 | American, United |
| 5 | St. Petersburg/Clearwater, Florida | 76,610 | Allegiant |
| 6 | Orlando/Sanford, Florida | 74,660 | Allegiant |
| 7 | Dallas/Fort Worth, Texas | 68,330 | American |
| 8 | New York-LaGuardia, New York | 53,740 | American, Delta |
| 9 | Denver, Colorado | 42,490 | Allegiant, United |
| 10 | Newark, New Jersey | 38,890 | Allegiant, United |

== Accidents and incidents ==
On July 19, 1967, Piedmont Airlines Flight 22, a Boeing 727-100, collided in mid-air with a Cessna 310 just south of the airport in Hendersonville. The collision happened just moments after the 727 took off from the Asheville Airport. All 82 people on both planes were killed.

On March 14, 2003, a Cessna 177 Cardinal crashed into Old Fort Mountain after taking off from the airport. It killed author Amanda Davis, who was on a book tour promoting her first novel Wonder When You'll Miss Me, and her parents.

On October 27, 2004, a Beechcraft Duke crashed about 0.8 of a mile off the departure end of Runway 34 after an apparent right engine failure, killing all four people on board.

On May 4, 2007, a 1977 Cessna 182 en route to Asheville Regional Airport crashed near the airport, killing three Georgia men. Initial reports falsely said that rapper Jay-Z was on board.

On October 6, 2017, a terrorist deposited a bag containing an improvised explosive device near the entrance to the Asheville Regional Airport terminal. The bomb was set to explode the following morning at 6:00 AM but was defused after being detected by bomb-sniffing dogs. The terrorist, Michael Christopher Estes, was arrested and faced two federal charges. Estes pleaded guilty to one count of unlawful possession of an explosive in an airport on January 12, 2018; the other charge was dismissed.

On December 27, 2019, a small plane crashed in the Western North Carolina Agricultural Center parking lot adjacent to the airport shortly after takeoff. All five people on board survived with injuries and escaped before the plane exploded.

On December 14, 2023, a Diamond DA-40 NG crash landed on Interstate 26 after declaring an emergency due to a total loss of engine power. 2 people were onboard the plane, a student pilot and their instructor. Both escaped the plane before it was engulfed in flames.

== See also ==
- List of airports in North Carolina
