= Lillian Frances Parker Wallace =

American historian (1890–1971)

Lillian Frances Parker Wallace (April 11, 1890 – May 30, 1971) was an American historian and musician.

== Career ==
Parker Wallace was professor of history at Meredith College from 1921 to 1962. She was chair of the department from 1947 until she retired. In 1964, she was awarded an honorary doctorate from North Carolina State University.

== Personal life ==
On 12 June 1911 she married William Harvey Wallace; they had two children, a son, Wesley Herndon Wallace (b. 18 Apr. 1912), and a daughter, Marian Frances Wallace (b. 18 Sept. 1916), and later separated.

== Legacy ==
A lecture series at Meredith College is named for Wallace.

== Bibliography ==
- The Papacy and European Diplomacy: 1869-1878, University of North Carolina Press, 1948
- (ed.) Power, Opinion and Diplomacy, Duke University Press, 1959
- Leo XIII and the Rise of Socialism by Lillian Parker Wallace, Duke University Press, 1966
