= Amanda Davis (writer) =

American writer (1971–2003)

- Born: February 28, 1971; Durham, North Carolina, U.S.
- Died: March 14, 2003 (aged 32); McDowell County, North Carolina, U.S.
- Education: Wesleyan University (BA); Brooklyn College (MFA)
- Writing career
- Years active: 1999–2003
- Notable works: Circling the Drain (1999); Wonder When You'll Miss Me (2003)

Amanda Davis (February 28, 1971 – March 14, 2003) was an American writer and teacher.

== Early life ==
Amanda Davis was born on February 28, 1971, in Durham, North Carolina.

She graduated from Charles E. Jordan High School and received a B.A. in theatre at Wesleyan University, as well as a M.F.A. in fiction at Brooklyn College.

== Career ==
In 1999, Davis published a series of short stories called Circling the Drain. It was reviewed in various newspapers including The New York Times and Los Angeles Times, as well as the website Salon. In the Los Angeles Times, critic Mark Rozzo wrote, "At their best, Davis' stories are potent miniatures about the weird demands that uncertainty and inevitability place upon people, mostly young women linked to men or situations seemingly beyond their control."

Davis' short story "Louisiana Loses Its Cricket Hum" was featured in the 2001 edition of Best New American Voices. Four days before her death, Davis was interviewed by Dawn Dreyer of Indy Week regarding her life and career. According to Michael Chabon, Davis planned to write a second novel, either a historical novel about "early Jewish immigrants to the South" or a "creepy modern gothic".

Davis taught undergraduate and graduate fiction at Mills College.

== Personal life ==
Davis was Jewish. She had one brother, Adam, and one sister, Joanna.

== Death ==
On March 14, 2003, while touring for her first novel, Wonder When You′ll Miss Me, Davis was in a Cessna 177 Cardinal piloted by her father, James Davis. 18 miles from the Asheville Regional Airport, the plane crashed on Old Fort Mountain in McDowell County, North Carolina, killing Davis and her parents.

After her death, several writers paid their respects to her, including Heidi Julavits of Poets & Writers magazine, and others on McSweeney's, the site where Davis' work previously appeared.

== Legacy ==
In honor of Davis' life, McSweeney's introduced the Amanda Davis Highwire Fiction Award in 2004, given to a female writer 32 years old or younger who embodied "Amanda's personal strengths—warmth, generosity, a passion for community—and who needs some time to finish a book in progress".
