= Charles E. Jordan High School =

American public school in North Carolina

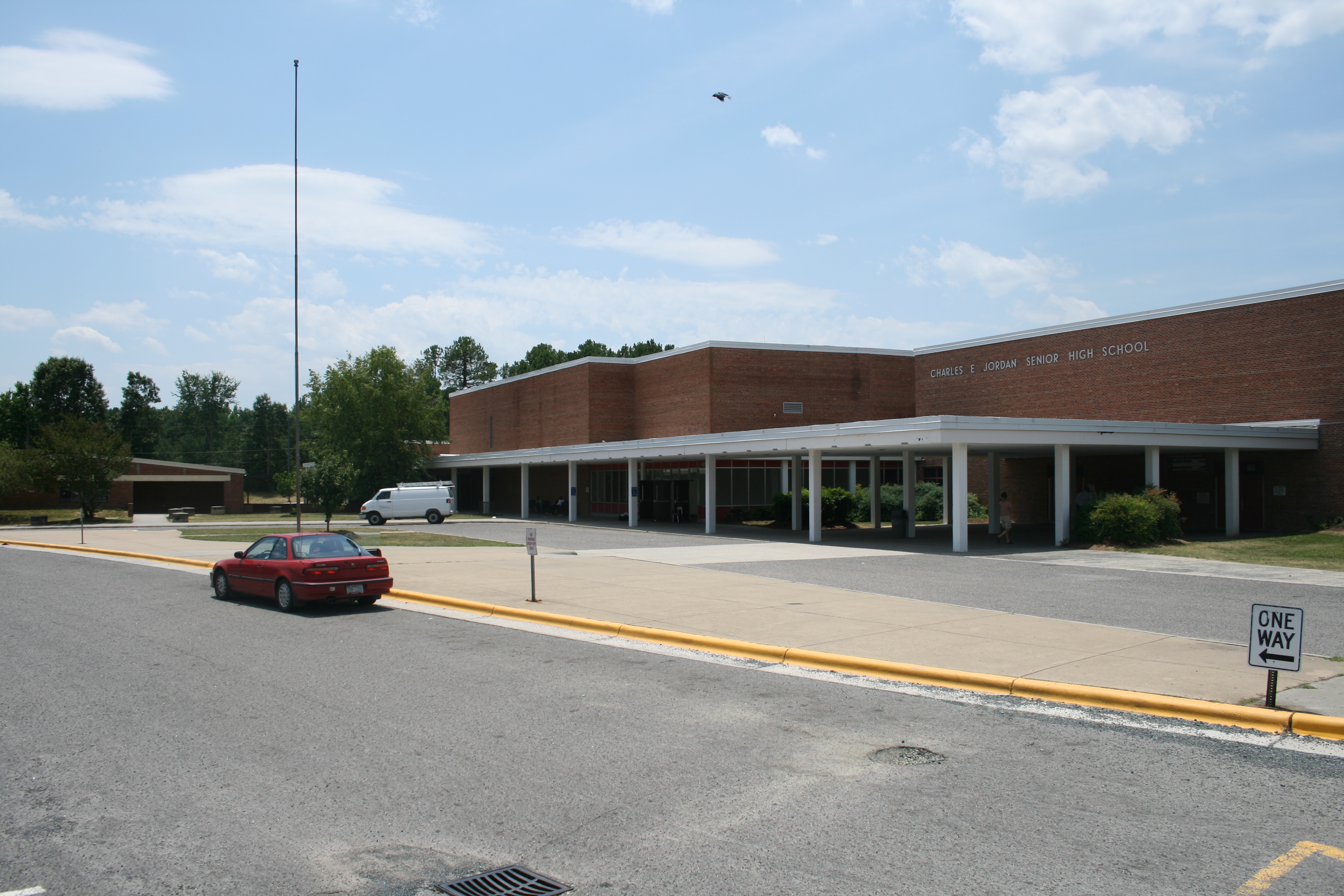

Location
- 6806 Garrett Road; Durham, North Carolina 27707; United States; 35°55′21″N 78°57′44″W

Information
- Other names: Jordan High School; JHS
- Type: Public
- Established: 1963 (63 years ago)
- School district: Durham Public Schools
- CEEB code: 341060
- Principal: Susan Taylor
- Teaching staff: 104.69 (FTE)
- Enrollment: 2,189 (2024-2025)
- Student to teacher ratio: 20.91
- Colors: Red and navy blue
- Athletics: NCHSAA 8A
- Athletics conference: Quad City Seven 8A
- Mascot: Falcon
- Website: dpsnc.net/domain/54

Charles E. Jordan High School (generally referred to as Jordan) is located in Durham, North Carolina, United States. It is one of seven high schools in Durham Public Schools. It is located on Garrett Road near Hope Valley Road in southwest Durham. The school mascot is the falcon.

Jordan students come from many local middle schools such as Shepard, Sherwood Githens, Lowe's Grove, Immaculata, and Rogers-Herr.

Jordan's enrollment was 2068 as of the 2023-2024 school year. Students at Jordan come from a broad swathe of southern and western Durham, covering neighborhoods of varying socio-economic backgrounds. The school is fairly balanced between African American and White students but has seen a rising number of Hispanic students due to the influx of native Spanish speakers in Durham's population.

In 2005, Newsweek magazine ranked Jordan 192nd in its annual listing of top high schools in the United States. In 2007, Newsweek ranked Jordan as the 307th best high school in America. This study was based largely on the ratio of Advanced Placement or International Baccalaureate Tests taken to the number of graduating high school seniors.

Jordan High School is also known for its Freshman Academy. The Freshman Academy is a comprehensive freshman transition program for all first-time (or non-repeating) 9th graders. Each freshman is assigned to a Freshman Academy "team," consisting of a counselor and four teachers and subjects: English, Honors Biology or Earth Science, World History, and Health & Physical Education. Each teaching team serves approximately 110–120 common students.

The Academy was created as a response to a large number of freshman retentions as 100 to 150 freshmen were retained each year, at that time. A student could easily fall between the cracks when his/her stakeholders were not communicating regularly about the student’s progress. During the 2003–04 school year, the staff began researching freshman academies across the state and the country. It was determined that the teaming concept used widely at the middle school level had merit on many levels and was the most practical way to address many of our transition needs. During the 2004–05 academic year, a pilot program was introduced including 40% of the Freshman class hand-selected for the program, expanding it full-scale in 2005–06. Since then the freshman academy has led to a significant decrease in retentions and has attracted students from all across Durham. During the 2013/2014 school year only 38 out of 413 students were retained.

== Athletics ==
The Jordan Falcons are a member of the North Carolina High School Athletic Association (NCHSAA) and are classified as a 8A school. The school is a part of the Quad City Seven 8A Conference.

Jordan has a rich tradition in athletics. The 2012/2013 athletic teams won seven conference championships (men's tennis, men's and women's basketball, men's and women's track and field, lacrosse, women’s soccer, and wrestling). The school also has a nationally recognized men’s soccer program that has won 3 state titles.

== History ==
The school was named after Charles E. Jordan (1901–1974), a university administrator and member and chairman of the Durham County Board of Education. Charles E. Jordan High School opened in 1963. At that time, the school belonged to the Durham County School System, along with Northern High School and Southern High School. The school was originally called Charles E. Jordan Junior-Senior High School in its first year, due to how it contained grades 8 through 11. Now the school contains grades 9 through 12.

During desegregation, there was less concern about Jordan High School, because it had been attended by more affluent families of all colors.

Jordan High School once shared its building with Githens Junior High School (now called Githens Middle School), beginning in 1966. An interior gate on a hallway divided the two schools. Githens contained grades (7, 8 and 9). In 1988, a new stand alone Githens Junior High School building was completed at 4800 Chapel Hill Road. Jordan High School then took the entire building it currently occupies.

In 2022, with over 2,000 students, Jordan High School is the largest in the system. A ten-year plan calls for Jordan High School to be replaced, possibly on the current 99-acre site.

== Notable alumni ==
- Courtney Alexander, NBA player
- Vincent Anthony Jr., college football defensive end for the Duke Blue Devils
- Cassandra Butts, lawyer, policy expert, and Deputy White House counsel
- Amanda Davis, writer and teacher
- The Duffer Brothers, writers and directors, notable for creating the Netflix series Stranger Things
- Carly Fiorina, businesswoman and political figure
- Joey Harrell, professional basketball player
- Susan Hill, women's rights advocate
- Penn Holderness, internet celebrity and former journalist
- Mac McCaughan, musician and record label owner
- Ike Opara, Major League Soccer (MLS) player
- Logan Pause, Major League Soccer player and member of the United States men's national soccer team
- Brianna Pinto, soccer player in the National Women's Soccer League
- Malik Pinto, soccer player in Major League Soccer
- Jahon Rad, professional soccer player in the USL
- Dominique Sutton, professional basketball player
- Justin Watts, professional basketball player and 2009 NCAA Basketball champion with the University of North Carolina
- Amy Wright, advocate for disabled people, was named 2017 CNN Hero of the Year

== See also ==
- Durham Public Schools
- DPS Foundation
