= Michael Christopher Estes =

American terrorist (born 1971)

- Born: June 11, 1971 (age 55)
- Known for: Placing an improvised explosive device at Asheville Regional Airport
- Criminal charges: Attempted malicious use of explosive materials; Unlawful possession of explosive materials in an airport
- Criminal penalty: 46 months in prison; 2 years of probation

Michael Christopher Estes (born June 11, 1971), formerly of Tazewell, Tennessee, is an American man who was arrested on charges of terrorism, after he placed an improvised explosive device at North Carolina's Asheville Regional Airport in 2017.

== Incident ==
Estes put an explosive device outside the entrance to the baggage claim area of Asheville Regional Airport after midnight on October 6, 2017. The explosive device was made of nails, a shotgun shell, and an explosive material of ammonium nitrate and fuel oil in a Mason jar. Estes wrote "For God & Country" on the strike strip of a matchbox attached to the explosive device, and he wrote "For All the V/N Vets Out There!!!" on tape attached to the device. Attached to the device was a clock with an alarm positioned at 6 o'clock, but the alarm was not set. The bomb did not go off. When the airport's police were alerted to the suspicious bags, the police evacuated the baggage claim area, and bomb technicians were able to disarm the device. In the woods near the airport, law enforcement also found an REI backpack that Estes had left. In the backpack, Estes had put gloves, fuel, a roll of tape, and an alarm clock bell that matched the one in the bag near the baggage area.

The backpack was tracked to a local REI store. Estes had paid in cash, but he had used his REI loyalty card, which had his name linked to it. After a photograph of Estes from surveillance cameras was circulated, police officers from Asheville Police Department found Estes by a Walmart near the airport the next day, and he was arrested. Following his arrest, Estes confessed responsibility, saying he had wanted to start a war on United States soil.

After being arrested, Estes claimed he had planted the device at the airport to train law enforcement about how explosive devices were made so they would be prepared to fight terrorists that he said were coming to the United States to wage war.

== Conviction ==
Estes was charged with attempted malicious use of explosive materials and unlawful possession of explosive materials in an airport. Estes pleaded guilty to one count of unlawful possession of an explosive in an airport on January 12, 2018; the first charge was dismissed. He was sentenced to 46 months in prison and two years of probation.

== Reactions ==
Civil rights activist Shaun King, writing in The Intercept, said that the lack of media attention was because the suspect was white.

Buncombe County Detention Center's records list Estes as a 46-year-old "American Indian / Alaskan Native".

Jimmie Estes, Michael Estes' father, said he had not spoken to his son in several years and that their relationship had fractured after Michael Estes joined the Navy. Jimmie Estes said that the family was not Native American and that they were of European ancestry, which agrees with other state records.

== Other crimes ==
The month before planting the explosive device at the airport, Estes had been jailed on charges of breaking and entering, larceny, and attacking a man with a hatchet and knife in Swain County, North Carolina. Estes had served seven days in prison.

== See also ==
- Lone wolf (terrorism)
