= Thomas Meredith (Baptist leader) =

American pastor and newspaper editor

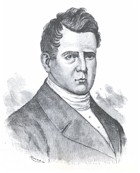
- Born: July 7, 1795; Bucks County, Pennsylvania, United States
- Died: November 13, 1850 (aged 55); Raleigh, North Carolina
- Occupation: Baptist pastor
- Known for: Founder and editor of the Biblical Recorder newspaper

Thomas Meredith (July 7, 1795 – November 13, 1850) was an influential Baptist pastor, one of the founders of the Baptist State Convention of North Carolina (BSCNC) in the United States, and the founder and editor of the Biblical Recorder newspaper.

== Early years ==
Meredith was born in Warwick Township, Bucks County, Pennsylvania, the son of a prosperous farmer. He attended Doylestown Academy, a famous classical school, and then the University of Pennsylvania, graduating in January 1816. He had originally planned to become a lawyer, but while at university he became a Baptist, and in 1817 he went to North Carolina as a missionary after a year of theological training. In 1819 Meredith married Georgia Sears, and the couple eventually had eleven children. Between 1819 and 1837 Meredith was pastor of churches in New Bern (1819–1821), Savannah (1822–1825), Edenton (1825–1835), and again New Bern (1835–1838) rising steadily in stature within the North Carolina church.

== Church leader ==
Meredith was in demand as a speaker. William Carey Crane, an eminent theologian, said his sermons "did not sway men so much by touching appeals as by presenting the truth to them with irresistible power." Meredith was one of the founders of the North Carolina Baptist State Convention in 1830, the author of its constitution and of a letter to Baptists in the state that explained the organization's purpose and importance. Later he became secretary, vice president and President of the convention.

== Educationalist ==
Meredith felt the education of young people was of great importance, and the second article of the BSCNC constitution defined one of the main purposes of the convention as "the education of young men called of God to the ministry." He was a strong supporter of Wake Forest Institute (now Wake Forest University), launched in 1834, and the first president of its board of trustees. He was invited to become a professor of mathematics and moral philosophy at Wake Forest, but declined. Unusually for the time, he supported the higher education of women, and called for the convention to establish "a female seminary of high order." Nothing was done at the time, but eventually the Baptist Female University was chartered in 1891, opened in 1899, and in 1909 renamed Meredith College in his honor.

== Editor ==
In January 1833 Meredith issued the first number of the monthly Baptist Interpreter, and two years later replaced it by the weekly Biblical Recorder. In 1838 Meredith resigned as pastor of his church in New Bern and moved to Raleigh to work full-time for the Recorder. Despite poor health and lack of money, Meredith persevered, writing clear and principled editorials on issues of the day. Although a native Pennsylvanian, Meredith adapted to his adopted region as a slave owner for most of his adult life, a fact he never revealed in his public writing. While silent on his ownership of slaves, Meredith wrote forcefully against the abolition movement and published a pamphlet supporting slavery in 1847. In his pamphlet Meredith argued "that slaveholding is, per se, wholly inoffensive; that the relation of master and slave is as accordant with the general precepts of the gospel, as that of parent and child, or of husband and wife; and that, therefore, all charges of a criminal nature founded on this relation, and alleged against Southern Christians, are unreasonable and unjust.” Beyond slavery Meredith also weighed in on "Campbellism", which threatened to cause a split in the Baptist movement, temperance, and the troubled relationship with the Triennial Convention. At that time, many Baptist preachers had limited formal education. Religious periodicals such as the Recorder were of great importance to pastors in furthering their theological education and staying connected to other Baptists. Meredith often published multi-issue expositions of key doctrines or defenses of traditional evangelical theological convictions, always providing a rigorously orthodox view.

Thomas Meredith died on 13 November 1850 in Raleigh. In 1898, Dr. Thomas E. Skinner, pastor of the First Baptist Church of Raleigh, said "The Rev. Thomas Meredith was undoubtedly the ablest man who has yet appeared among us".

== See also ==
- Southern Baptist Convention
- List of Southern Baptist Convention affiliated people
- Southern Baptist-related schools, colleges and universities
