= Jo Allen (academic administrator) =

American academic administrator

Jo Allen (born c. 1958) is an American academic administrator who served as the eighth president of Meredith College since 2011. She was previously the provost at Widener University.

== Life ==
Allen was born c. 1958 to Lorraine and Bob Allen and is from La Grange, North Carolina. Her father was formerly a prisoner in a German prisoner-of-war camps in World War II. He later owned dental supply houses in North Carolina. Her parents met while they were students at Wake Forest University. Allen earned a bachelor's degree in English from Meredith College. She completed a master's degree in English literature at East Carolina University. She received a Ph.D. in English literature at Oklahoma State University.

Allen was a tenured associate professor of English at East Carolina University and North Carolina State University. She later worked as a professor of English, provost, and executive vice president at Widener University. On July 1, 2011, she became the eighth president of Meredith College. Allen announced her retirement in 2024 and was succeeded by Aimee Sapp.
