= Eleanor Layfield Davis =

American painter (1911–1985)

- Born: Eleanor Layfield; 1911; Richmond, Virginia, U.S.
- Died: September 2, 1985 (aged 73–74); Winston–Salem, North Carolina, U.S.
- Resting place: Forsyth Memorial Park
- Education: UNC-Greensboro; Arts and Crafts Association of Winston-Salem
- Known for: Painting, sculpting
- Spouse: Egbert L. Davis Jr.

Eleanor Layfield Davis (1911 – September 2, 1985), also called ELDA, was an American painter. She served on the Board of Trustees for Meredith College and both Meredith and Wake Forest University award art scholarships in her memory.

== Life ==
Eleanor Layfield Davis was born Eleanor Layfield in 1911, in Richmond, Virginia. She grew up in the Raleigh, North Carolina area, attending Peace College and Sweet Briar College. Davis went on to graduate from Meredith College in 1932. She was married to Egbert Lawrence Davis Jr. (1911–2006) and had four children.

Davis did not start painting until she was 47 years old. She primarily signed her works with the name ELDA developed from her initials. In addition to paintings, Davis also drew sketches and sculpted. She spent much of her life helping build up the arts community in Winston-Salem, North Carolina. She studied art at the Arts and Crafts Association of Winston-Salem and took some courses at the University of North Carolina at Greensboro. Davis was a founder and President of Associated Artists of Winston-Salem as well as organizer of Art Gallery Originals. Davis died on September 2, 1985, at Baptist Hospital in Winston–Salem. She was buried in Forsyth Memorial Park.

== Awards & honors ==
- Three awards at the Cloroben Arts and Crafts Exhibitions in Chicago and Miami
- Champion Paper Award at the Henley Southeastern Spectrum (1982)
- Meredith College awards the Eleanor Layfield Davis Scholarship for artistic talent.
- Wake Forest University's first art scholarship was named for Davis.
- The Meredith College's ceremonial mace was presented to the college in memory of Davis by her husband, Egbert L. Davis Jr.
- The Eleanor and Egbert Davis Gallery is named after Davis and her husband and hosts exhibits at The Sawtooth Center for Visual Arts in Winston-Salem.

== Exhibitions ==
During her lifetime, Davis produced many works that she exhibited both in group shows and in 15 individual exhibitions around the Southeast.

Posthumous exhibitions include a retrospective at Wake Forest University's Scales Fine Arts Center Gallery in 1986, and ELDA – Paintings by Eleanor Layfield Davis at the Sawtooth Center for Visual Arts in 2012. In early 2010, some of her works were included in a Meredith College alumnae art showcase.

Some of Davis' artwork was purchased by the North Carolina Art Society for the loan collection of the North Carolina Museum of Art.
