= Susan Hill (activist) =

American feminist (1948–2010)

- Born: August 7, 1948; Durham, North Carolina
- Died: January 30, 2010 (aged 61); Raleigh, United States
- Education: Meredith College
- Known for: #Advocacy of women's rights
- Awards: Nancy Susan Reynolds Award (2007); NOW's Woman of Courage Award; North Carolina Planned Parenthood Margaret Sanger Award (1999); Raleigh NOW Award (1999); National Abortion Rights Action League Choice Champion (1995); North Carolina NOW Equality for Women Award (1994)
- Scientific career
- Fields: activism

Susan Hill (August 7, 1948 – January 30, 2010) was an abortion rights activist from Durham, North Carolina. She was President of the National Women's Health Organization in North Carolina, helping oversee a group of abortion clinics in the Southeast. She is most celebrated for her commitment to women's reproductive rights, with the National Organization for Women writing about Hill "She went on to open the first abortion clinic in the state of Florida and was a founding member of both the National Abortion Federation and the National Coalition of Abortion Providers."

== Early life ==
Susan Hill was born and raised in Durham, North Carolina. She had two brothers. She graduated from Charles E. Jordan High School in 1966, then graduated from Meredith College in 1970 with a degree in social work.

After college in 1973, Hill went on to be a social worker in Florida, opening the first abortion clinic in the state.

== Work ==
Hill worked as an advocate of women's reproductive rights, and owned several women's health centers across the country, including the now famous Jackson Women's Health Center, the last remaining health center providing abortions in Mississippi.

Hill's main focus was on providing clinics to rural areas where women had little to no access to abortion services. She opened more clinics than anyone else in the United States.

She served as plaintiff in over 30 federal and state lawsuits concerning abortion rights. She was a key plaintiff in the case NOW v. Scheidler, which charged abortion opponents with using violence, intimidation, and extortion to put women's clinics out of business.

NARAL Pro-Choice North Carolina annually offers the Susan Hill Award to people who are leaders in reproductive health and rights in North Carolina.

== Opposition ==
Hill faced a great amount of scrutiny over her pro-choice views, specifically from anti-abortion activists. She received many death threats, and had to wear a bulletproof vest to work every day because of the threats of violence.

In 1993, a Florida doctor at one of Hill's clinics, David Gunn was killed by a protester. In 2009, Hill's close friend Dr. George Tiller was killed by an anti-abortion extremist. Hill said Tiller's words inspired her to continue her work in women's rights. When Hill asked Tiller why he had not retired in the face of increasing harassment, he said "Because I can't leave these women."

== Death ==
Hill died January 30, 2010, at a hospital in Raleigh, North Carolina, after a battle with breast cancer. She was 61 years old.
