= The Biblical Recorder =

- Format: Print & Digital
- Owner: Baptist State Convention of North Carolina
- Editor-in-chief: Seth Brown
- Founded: 1833
- Language: English
- Headquarters: Cary, North Carolina
- ISSN: 0279-8182
- Website: brnow.org

The Biblical Recorder is a news organization owned by the Baptist State Convention of North Carolina (BSCNC).

== Early history ==
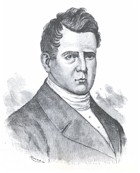
Thomas Meredith (1795-1850), founder and first editor

The newspaper was founded in 1833 by Thomas Meredith, a prominent Southern Baptist leader in North Carolina. Apart from providing news, Meredith used the paper as a vehicle for clear and principled editorials on issues of the day. Although a native Pennsylvanian, Meredith adapted to his adopted region as a slave owner for most of his adult life, a fact he never revealed in his public writing. While silent on his ownership of slaves, Meredith used the pages of the Biblical Recorder to defend slavery on biblical grounds and wrote forcefully against the abolition movement. In an 1847 proslavery pamphlet drawn from materials published in the Biblical Recorder, Meredith argued "that slaveholding is, per se, wholly inoffensive; that the relation of master and slave is as accordant with the general precepts of the gospel, as that of parent and child, or of husband and wife; and that, therefore, all charges of a criminal nature founded on this relation, and alleged against Southern Christians, are unreasonable and unjust.” He strongly opposed, "Campbellism", which threatened to cause a split in the Baptist movement, supported temperance, and weighed in on the troubled relationship with the Triennial Convention. At that time, many Baptist preachers had limited formal education. Religious periodicals such as the Recorder were of great importance to pastors in furthering their theological education and staying connected to other Baptists. Meredith often published multi-issue expositions of key doctrines or defenses of traditional evangelical theological convictions, always providing a rigorously orthodox view.

First published in Edenton, the paper was moved to New Bern in 1834 and to Raleigh in 1838, and to Cary in 2011. After the move to Raleigh the paper was merged with the Southern Watchman of Charleston, South Carolina, and until 1842 was named The Recorder and Watchman. Meredith continued as editor until his death in 1851. The paper then went through various changes of ownership, at some times suspended for lack of funds. C.T. Bailey, who edited the Recorder in the late 1800s, died in 1895 and was succeeded by his son Josiah Bailey, aged 22. Josiah Bailey used the paper to promote the development of public education based on state aid for primary and secondary education, a change from earlier policy which had advocated parochial schools. Bailey also championed the temperance movement. After leaving the paper he had a successful career as a lawyer and a Senator.

The Biblical Recorder was purchased by Baptist State Convention of North Carolina in 1930.

== Leadership ==
The Biblical Recorder is governed by a board of directors consisting of 20 members elected by the Baptist State Convention of North Carolina. Recent editors include J. Marse Grant (1960–1982), R.G. Puckett (1982–1998), Tony Cartledge (1998–2007), Norman Jameson (2007–2010) and K. Allan Blume (2011–2019). The current editor, Seth Brown, began in June 2019.

== Format ==
The format and delivery system that makes the Recorder available to Baptists has changed over time. For over 160 years the print edition was the only medium for publishing news. In September 1997 the Recorder launched one of the first Baptist news websites. The site was redesigned and re-launched in October 2011 as BRnow.org. In May 2012 a weekly e-newsletter, the BRweekly, was launched. In 2013 the Recorder launched an app for smartphones, a digital online edition and an updated responsive design website. The bi-weekly print version is distributed throughout North Carolina, 48 states and 39 foreign countries.

In 2019, the Recorder adopted a digital-first content strategy, launched a branding update and redeveloped its website.

== See also ==
- Southern Baptist Convention
- Baptist State Convention of North Carolina
- Baptist Press
