= Joey Harrell =

American basketball player (born 1985)

Joseph Harrell Jr. (born May 11, 1985) is an American former professional basketball player.

Harrell, a 202 cm forward, hails from Durham, North Carolina. In 2003, after a successful high school career at C.E. Jordan High School, he accepted a full Division I scholarship to play basketball at UNC Asheville.

In 2007, after completing his four years and graduating, Harrell began his pro career. His first overseas experience came after he was chosen to play for Team USA Select. This team traveled to various countries in Europe, playing professional teams for a 30-day period. Harrell went on to play four full professional seasons in New Zealand, Portugal, Australia and Egypt.

In addition to playing professionally, Harrell coached AAU basketball for three years with the United Celtics and one season with the Wilson Blue Devils. Harrell has coached clinics in Ireland, England, Finland, Scotland, New Zealand, and Australia where he was in charge of the Aussie Hoops program. While in Australia, Harrell also taught individual skill sessions which eventually led to one of his pupils earning a Division 1 scholarship. Harrell continues to train male and female athletes at all levels, ranging from middle school to professional.
