= Meredith College =

Private women's college in Raleigh, North Carolina, US

- Former names: Baptist Female University (1891–1904); Baptist University for Women (1904–1909)
- Motto: Lux (Latin)
- Motto in English: Light
- Type: Private women's liberal arts college and coeducational graduate school
- Established: 1891; 135 years ago
- Religious affiliation: Nonsectarian; historically affiliated with the Baptist State Convention of North Carolina until 1997
- Endowment: $148.9 million (2025)
- President: Aimee Sapp
- Faculty: 118 full time (fall 2023)
- Students: 1,576 (fall 2023)
- Undergraduates: 1,309 (fall 2023)
- Postgraduates: 267 (fall 2023)
- Location: Raleigh, North Carolina, United States; 35°47′53″N 78°41′18″W
- Campus: Urban
- Colors: Maroon and white
- Sporting affiliations: NCAA Division III—USA South Athletic Conference
- Mascot: Avenging Angels
- Website: meredith.edu
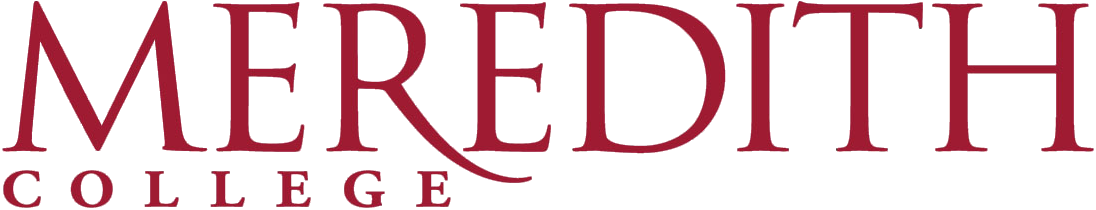

Meredith College is a private women's liberal arts college and coeducational graduate school in Raleigh, North Carolina. As of 2025, Meredith enrolls approximately 1,600 women in its undergraduate programs and 275 men and women in its graduate programs.

== History ==
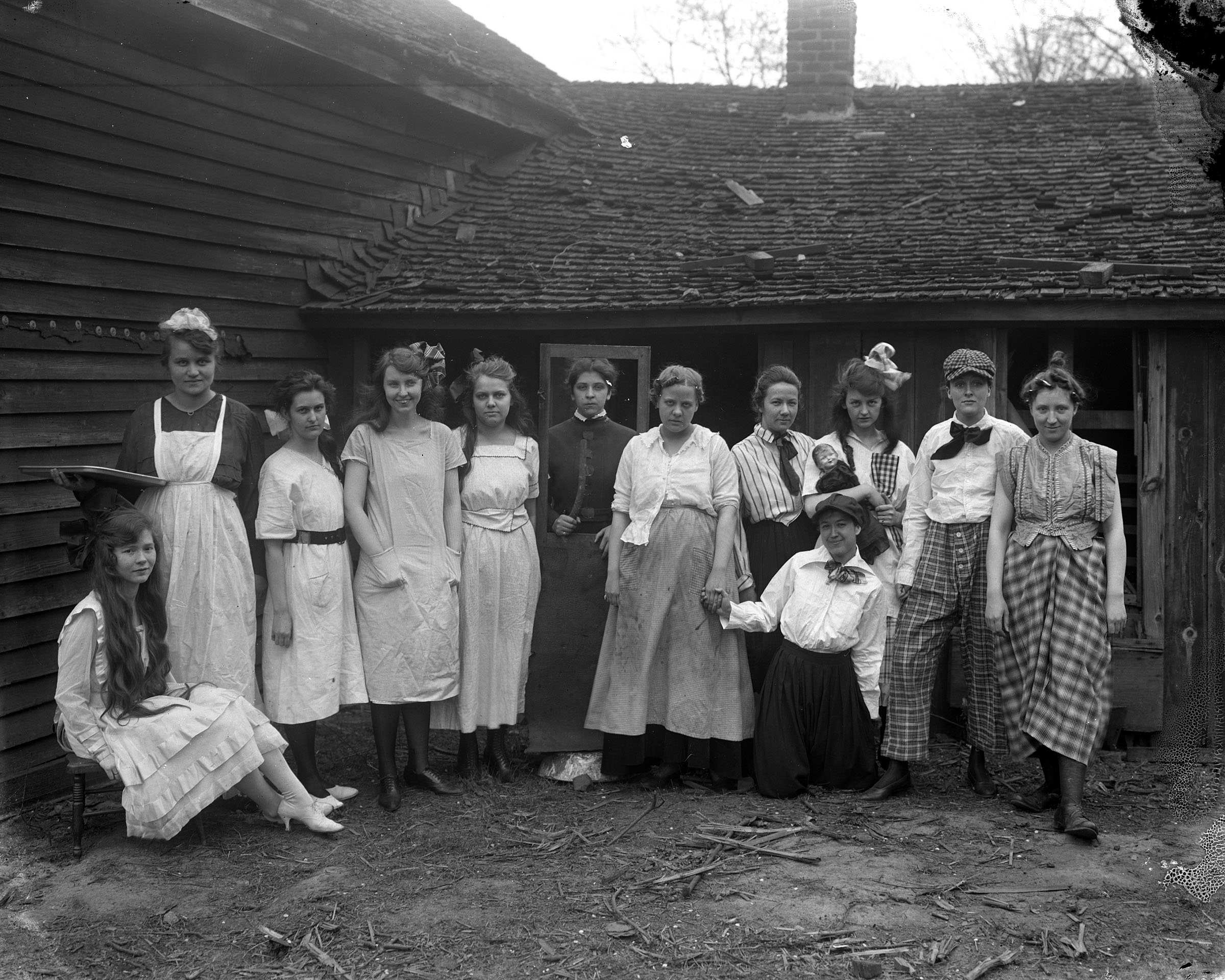
Students of Meredith College in 1919

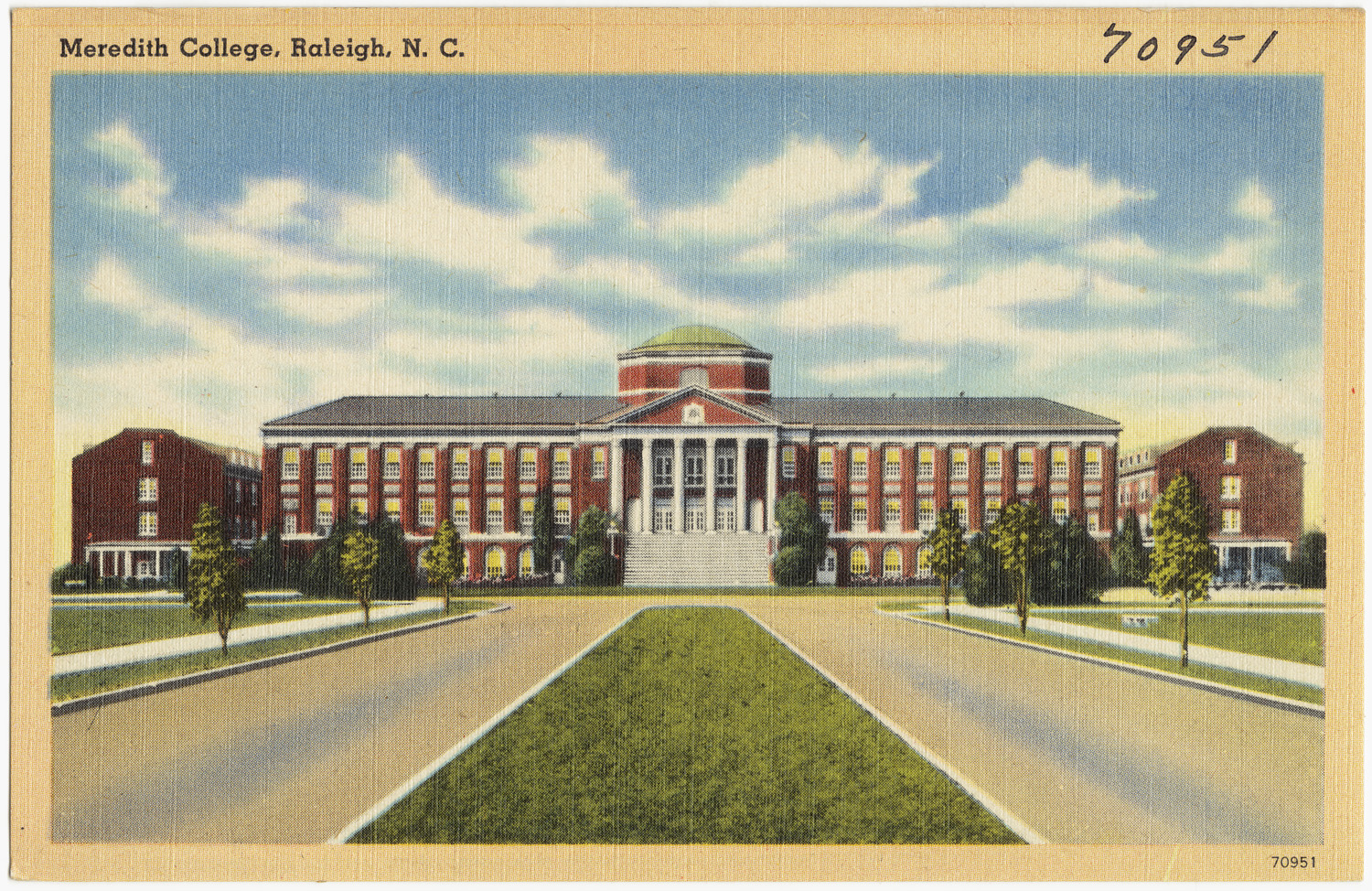
Main building in 1930s

Chartered by the First Baptist Church, the college first opened as the "Baptist Female University" in 1891 in a facility in downtown Raleigh. In 1904, the school's name was first changed to "Baptist University for Women". In 1909, the school adopted its current name, "Meredith College", to honor Thomas Meredith, who was the founder of the Baptist newspaper The Biblical Recorder.

In 1997, the college moved away from a direct connection with the Baptist State Convention of North Carolina.

Meredith began construction at the current location on Hillsborough Street near North Carolina State University in 1924, and students began attending classes there in 1926. The campus covers 225 acres (0.91 km^{2}) and is located close to both Raleigh-Durham International Airport and Research Triangle Park.

In 1980 an angel was chosen as the school sports mascot, but in the summer of 2007 this was changed to the "Avenging Angels".

In April 2022, the school renamed Joyner Hall, named for white supremacy advocate James Yadkin Joyner, as part of its anti-racism initiatives.

== Academics ==
42 majors are offered at Meredith, as well as licensure, graduate, and pre-professional programs. According to U.S. News & World Report the most popular majors are Psychology, Biology/Biological Sciences, Business Administration and Management, Child Development and Social Work.

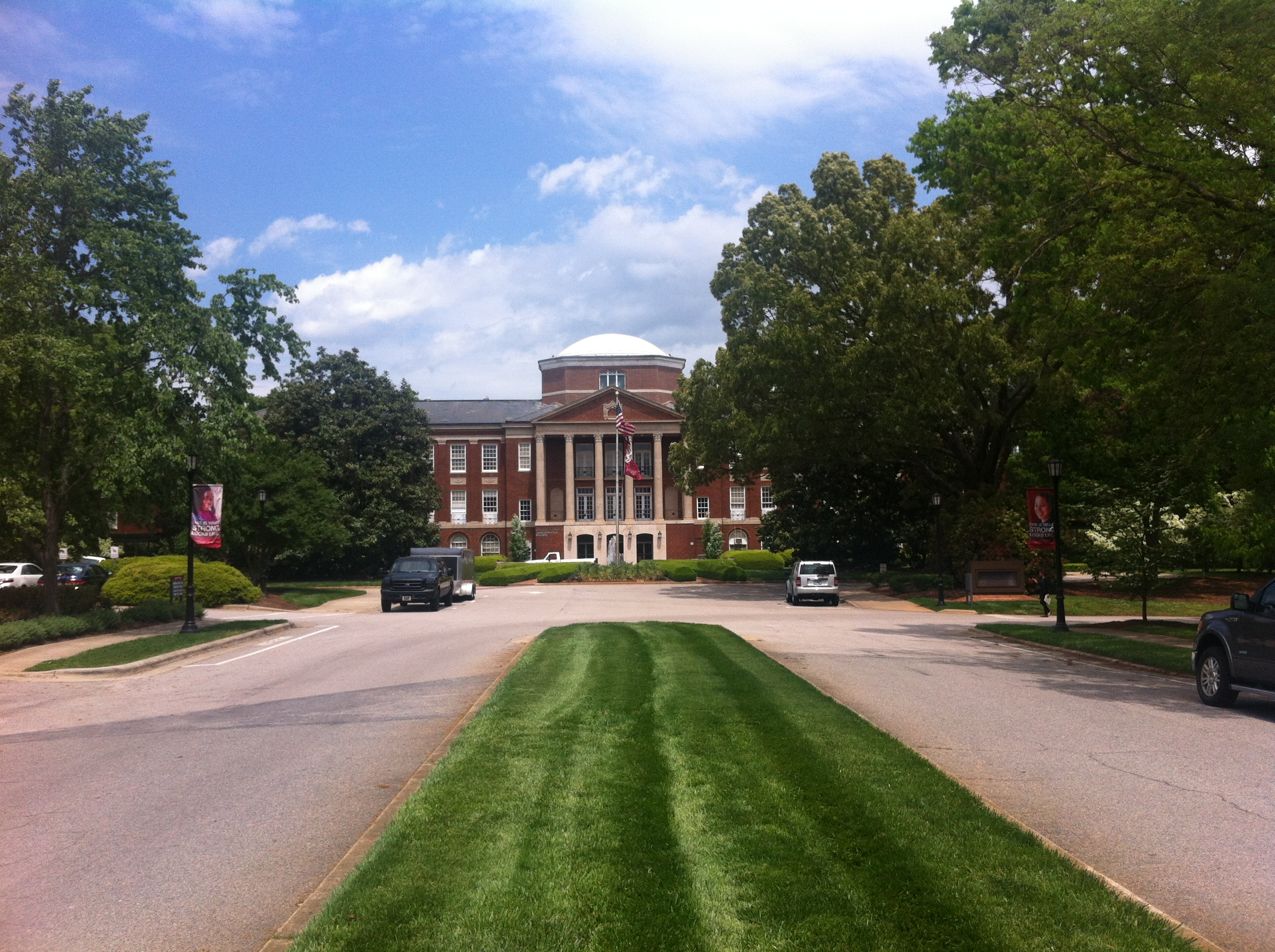
Main entrance and building

Upon completing an undergraduate major, students can earn a Bachelor of Arts, Bachelor of Science, Bachelor of Music, or Bachelor of Social Work. The John E. Weems Graduate School is coeducational.

Undergraduate students who wish to study engineering can participate in a five-year dual-degree program that allows them to earn degrees from both Meredith and North Carolina State University's College of Engineering. To do this, students must major in either chemistry, computer science, or mathematics at Meredith. Under this arrangement, students earn a B.A. from Meredith in chemistry, computer science, or mathematics, and a B.S. from NCSU in engineering.

The college's Undergraduate Research Program supports student/faculty partnerships for the purposes of academic research and creative activity in all fields. College funds support these projects and underwrite travel costs for students presenting their work at conferences. The college hosts an annual one-day research conference called Celebrating Student Achievement Day in April to present the work of Meredith student.

== Student life ==
Meredith College is noted for its traditions, which range from the Honor Code to Corn', a yearly weeklong festival encouraging competition between graduating classes. Meredith College also celebrates its Founder's Day every year. During each college generation, faculty perform an adaptation of Alice in Wonderland for students, keeping their involvement in the production a secret until the students see them on stage. Since 1936, a committee of senior students have designed a Class Doll to represent the culture, fashion, and relevant events representative of the graduating class. A gallery of the dolls can viewed at the Margaret Bright Doll Collection within the Johnson Hall Administration Building. During their Junior Year, students can purchase a distinct class ring called the Onyx, which has become a well-known, identifiable symbol for students and alumnae since its introduction in 1954. In October 2024, a six-foot statue of the Onyx was erected at main entrance with money raised by the Board of Trustees to commemorate the retirement of Jo Allen, who was the first Meredith alumna to serve as the college's President.

In November 2025, roughly 100 Meredith students made local news when they protested on campus, alleging a lack of transparency around mass layoffs and poor campus living conditions, citing such complaints as visible mold, fleas, and rats in dormitories.

== Rankings and classifications ==
As of 2021, Meredith College was ranked #136 in the category of Best Liberal Arts Colleges by U.S. News & World Report , was ranked #119 by Forbes among "In The South", and was categorized by The Princeton Review in the Best Southeastern category.

Meredith College was ranked fifth among regional colleges in the South in the 2016 edition of U.S. News & World Report's Best Colleges rankings. As of 2019 Meredith College is not included in this ranking as a southern regional university.

== Athletics ==
Meredith athletics logo

Meredith College's athletics teams are nicknamed the Avenging Angels.

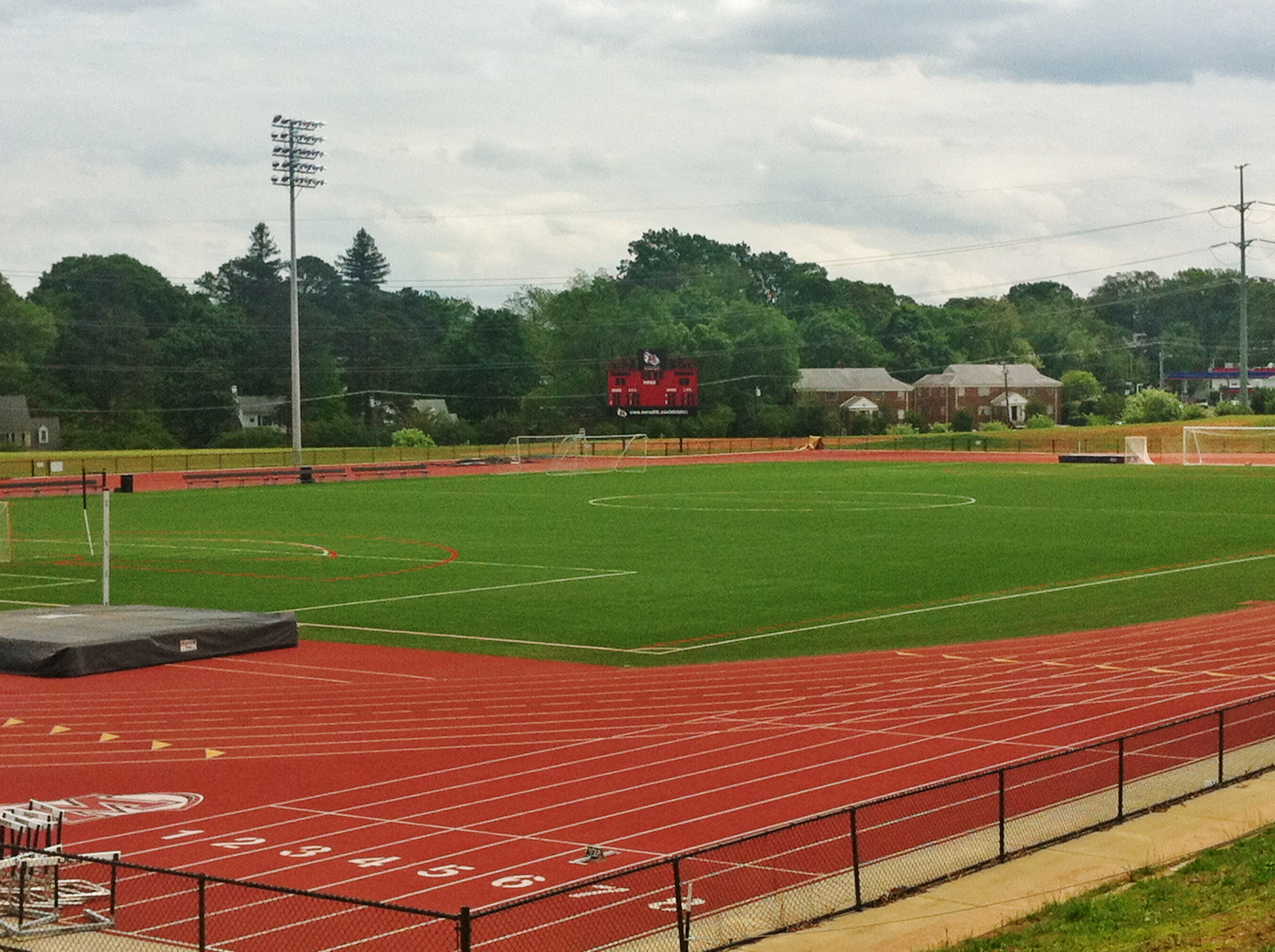
The main field for outdoor sports

As of May 2025 Meredith athletes compete in basketball, cross country, field hockey, golf, lacrosse, soccer, softball, tennis, track and field, and volleyball.

In August 2014, Meredith College announced the addition of track and field, and in September 2019, announced the addition of golf and field hockey.

A member of the USA South Athletic Conference since 2007, Meredith has claimed 26 USA South championships, made 15 NCAA appearances, and had 300 student-athletes named all-conference and 670 to USA South All-American.

== Notable people ==
=== Administration and Founders ===
- Jo Allen, president (2011–2024)
- E. Bruce Heilman, president (1966–1971)
- Thomas Meredith, founding figure and namesake
- Leonidas L. Polk, founding figure
- Hoyt Patrick Taylor, former trustee

=== Alumnae ===
- Carrie Lougee Broughton, North Carolina State Librarian
- Margaret Currin, first woman U.S. attorney in North Carolina, class of 1972
- Addie Elizabeth Davis, first woman ordained as a Southern Baptist pastor.
- Eleanor Layfield Davis, artist; class of 1932
- Annie Dove Denmark, fifth president of Anderson University
- Susan Hill, women's rights advocate
- Eleanor Hines (known professionally as Margaret Arlen), talk show host
- Roxie Collie Laybourne, ornithologist
- Beth Leavel, Tony Award winning musical theatre actor
- Lucile Aycock McKee, socialite, president of the Junior League of Raleigh
- Dale Mercer, interior designer, television personality, and socialite
- Elizabeth Reid Murray, historian, preservationist, and member of the Raleigh City Council
- Sarah Parker, former Chief Justice of the North Carolina Supreme Court
- Suzanne Reynolds, law professor and North Carolina Supreme Court candidate
- Silda Wall Spitzer, chair of Children for Children and former First Lady of New York
- Patricia N. Willoughby, former interim North Carolina Superintendent of Public Instruction
- Adrian H. Wood, educator, blogger, and writer
- Judy Woodruff, journalist
- Phyllis Trible, feminist biblical scholar

=== Faculty ===
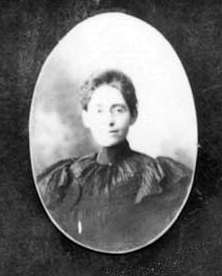
Ida Isabella

- Louise Hawes, writer and former guest lecturer
- Thomas C. Parramore, historian and noted North Carolina scholar
- Arthur Poister, organist
- Ida Isabella Poteat, painter
- Charlotte Ruegger, composer and violinist; music department chair
- Marion Elizabeth Stark, mathematician
- Lillian Frances Parker Wallace, historian

== See also ==
- SS Meredith Victory—WWII-era cargo freighter, named for Meredith College, and credited with the largest ever humanitarian rescue operation by a single ship during the Korean War.
- Women's colleges in the Southern United States
