= Helen Thomson =

Helen Thomson may refer to:

- Helen Thomson (politician)
- Helen Thomson (actress)

== See also ==
- Helen Thompson (disambiguation)
