= The Longest Hundred Miles =

1967 American-Filipino TV movie

- Genre: Drama; War
- Written by: Gene R. Kearney (as Gene Kearney)
- Directed by: Don Weis
- Starring: Doug McClure; Katharine Ross; Ricardo Montalbán
- Music by: Franz Waxman
- Countries of origin: United States; Philippines
- Original language: English

Production
- Producer: Jack Leewood
- Cinematography: Ray Flin
- Editor: Richard G. Wray
- Running time: 100 minutes
- Production company: Universal Television

Original release
- Network: NBC
- Release: January 21, 1967

The Longest Hundred Miles is a 1967 American-Filipino made-for-television drama war film directed by Don Weis and starring Doug McClure, Katherine Ross and Ricardo Montalbán.

== Cast ==
- Doug McClure as Cpl. Steve Bennett
- Katharine Ross as Laura Huntington
- Ricardo Montalbán as Father Sanchez (as Ricardo Montalban)
- Ronald Remy as Miguel
- Helen Thompson as Lupe
- Berting Labra as Pedro

== Production ==
The film was shot on location in the Philippines over three months.

== Reception ==
It was tied with The Doomsday Flight as the highest rated TV movies of 1966; they were also tied for sixth overall in the top ten of films aired on US TV, surrounded by theatrical feature films, released in the past and now being aired on television. The first five were feature films The Bridge on the River Kwai (1957), The Robe (1953), Lilies of the Field (1963), Five Branded Women (1960) and PT109 (1963). Rounding out the top ten, following the tie at sixth, was the past feature film Blue Hawaii (1961), the TV movie Fame Is the Name of the Game, and the tenth place tie of the feature films The Delicate Delinquent (1957) and A Summer Place (1959).

== See also ==
- List of American films of 1967
- List of Philippine films of the 1960s
