= Connie J. Bonslagel =

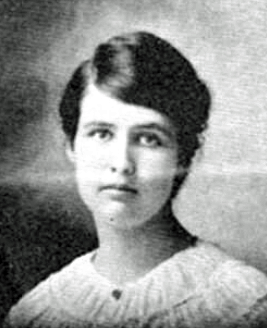
- Connie Bonslagel, from the 1905 yearbook of the Mississippi State College for Women
- Born: Constance Josephine Bonslagel; August 14, 1885; Deasonville, Mississippi
- Died: May 21, 1950 (aged 64)
- Resting place: Jackson, Mississippi
- Education: Mississippi State College for Women
- Occupations: Educator, social worker
- Parent(s): A. W. Bonslagel; Betty Beall Bonslagel

Constance Josephine Bonslagel (August 14, 1885 – May 21, 1950) was the Arkansas home demonstration agent for over 30 years, working under the auspices of the United States Department of Agriculture. During the Great Depression she was the assistant director of the Rehabilitation Division of the Federal Resettlement Administration.

== Life ==
Bonslagel was born on August 14, 1885, in Deasonville, Mississippi, the daughter of A. W. Bonslagel and Betty Beall Bonslagel. She attended the Mississippi State College for Women where she obtained her undergraduate degree. She went on to study at Teachers College, Columbia University in New York City, Peabody College in Nashville, and Tulane University in New Orleans.

== Career ==
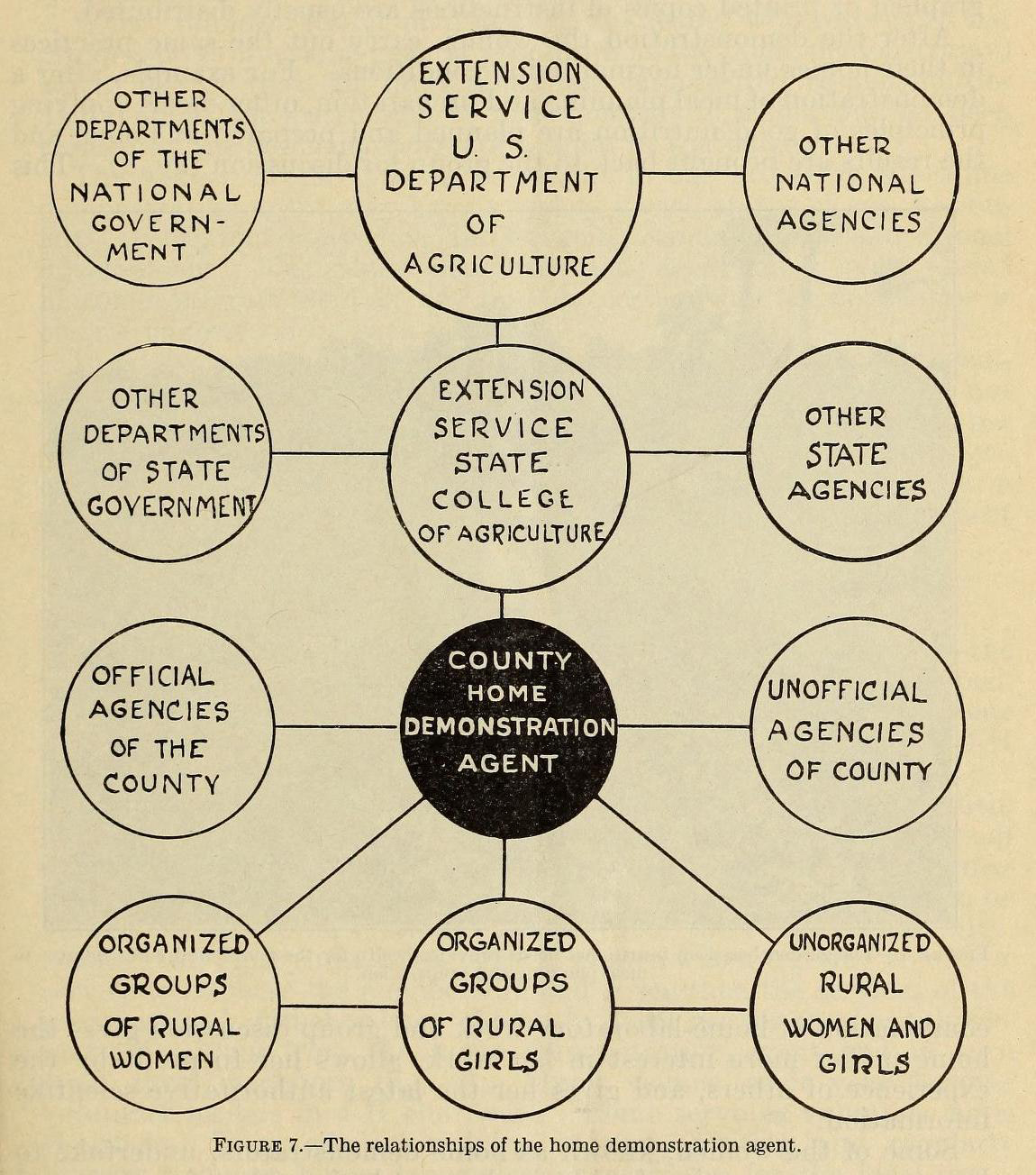
Fig 7 Home Demonstration Agent Relationships, from the 1933 USDA publication Home Demonstration Work

Bonslagel started her career as a state home demonstration agent in Mississippi in 1915, and became an agent in Arkansas in 1917. She remained in Arkansas for the remainder of her career, which spanned until 1950. The job of home demonstration agent was created by Home demonstration clubs established by the Smith–Lever Act of 1914 as a way of coordinating and sharing home economics information among rural women. Bonslagel would visit different parts of the states, accompanying the county agent and staying at farms along the way.

In the 1930s Bonslagel established an annual retreat for rural women at the military camp Camp Joseph T. Robinson, which was attended by as many as 1,200 women.

She was an advocate of the Arkansas home demonstration clubs including writing letters and articles to report on achievements. She was active in keeping the extension program going through the Depression when funding was scarce, including fund raising for counties. Her fund-raising activities continued into the 1950s, specifically through the 4H Club to provide housing for women who wanted to attend the University of Arkansas.

Outside of her work as a home demonstration agent, Bonslagel was a member of the Women’s Committee of the Council of Defense during World War I. She served as assistant director of the Rehabilitation Division of the Federal Resettlement Administration in the 1930s.

Bonslagel served on many committees including serving as president of the Arkansas Home Economics Association, vice president of the Association of Southern Agricultural Workers, and chairman of the Home Economics Division of the Arkansas Federation of Women’s Clubs. In 1940 she was named Woman of the Year in Agriculture by The Progressive Farmer magazine.

== Personal life ==
Bonslagel never married. She died on May 21, 1950, and is buried in Jackson, Mississippi.

== See also ==
- Home demonstration clubs
