= Marion Walker Spidle =

American educator (1897–1983)

Marion Walker Spidle (1897–1983) was an American educator. She was inducted into the Alabama Women's Hall of Fame.

== Biography ==
Born on July 18, 1897, to parents Letford William Walker and Georgeina Young Walker, in Jersey City, New Jersey. Spidle attended public schools in New Jersey and in Tennessee, and later graduating from the University of Montevallo in 1916. She also gained a B.S. and M.A. from Columbia University, and completed Graduate Studies at the University of Oregon. Spidle worked for the Alabama Polytechnic Institute from 1928 until it became Auburn University in 1960. She worked for Auburn, from 1960 until retiring in 1966. Spidle served as a Limestone County home demonstration agent. She later became both head and dean of the Auburn School of Home Economics, the dean of women, and the head of the agricultural experiment station. She campaigned heavily to secure funding for the School of Economics at Auburn. Spidle also worked with the American Home Economics Association, Presbyterian Church, and University of Montevallo.

Spidle married William Clarence Spidle, and they had one child, Margaret Campbell Spidle.

Spidle was named Progressive Farmer's Woman of the Year in Alabama in 1960. The Auburn University Home Economics Alumni Association established a scholarship honoring her. The National Council of Administrators of Home Economics named Spidle a pioneer in home economics in 1968. The home economics building at Auburn University in 1971 was named Marion Walker Spidle Hall. At the 1977 annual meeting of the Alabama Home Economics Association (of which she was a founder), she was honored for being a member for fifty years. In 1973, she was elected a ruling elder of the Auburn Presbyterian Church.
