= William Peace University =

Private college in Raleigh, North Carolina, US

Coordinates: 35.78872°N 78.63773°W

- Former names: Peace Institute (1857–1930); Peace Junior College (1930–1943); Peace College (1943–2011)
- Motto: Esse Quam Videri (Latin)
- Motto in English: To be, rather than to seem
- Type: Private college
- Established: 1857; 169 years ago
- Accreditation: SACS
- Endowment: $55 million (2022)
- President: Jennifer E. Walsh
- Undergraduates: 713
- Location: Raleigh, North Carolina, United States
- Campus: Urban
- Colors: Green and white
- Sporting affiliations: NCAA Division III - USA South
- Mascot: Pacer
- Website: peace.edu

William Peace University is a private college in Raleigh, North Carolina, United States. Affiliated with the Presbyterian Church, it offers undergraduate degrees in more than 30 majors and accelerated bachelor's degrees through Peace Online for working adults. The institution adopted its current name in 2012, concurrent with its decision to begin admitting men to its day program; it was previously a women's college known as "Peace Institute", "Peace Junior College", and "Peace College".

== History ==
The institution that eventually became William Peace University was founded in 1857 as "Peace Institute" by a group of men within the Presbyterian Synod of North Carolina. The leading donation of $10,000 (equivalent to $345,500 in 2025) came from William Peace, a prominent local merchant and a founding member of the First Presbyterian Church of Raleigh. Peace is believed to have been in the first class of the University of North Carolina, and was a longtime proponent of education as a benefactor of Raleigh Academy, a school primarily for boys.

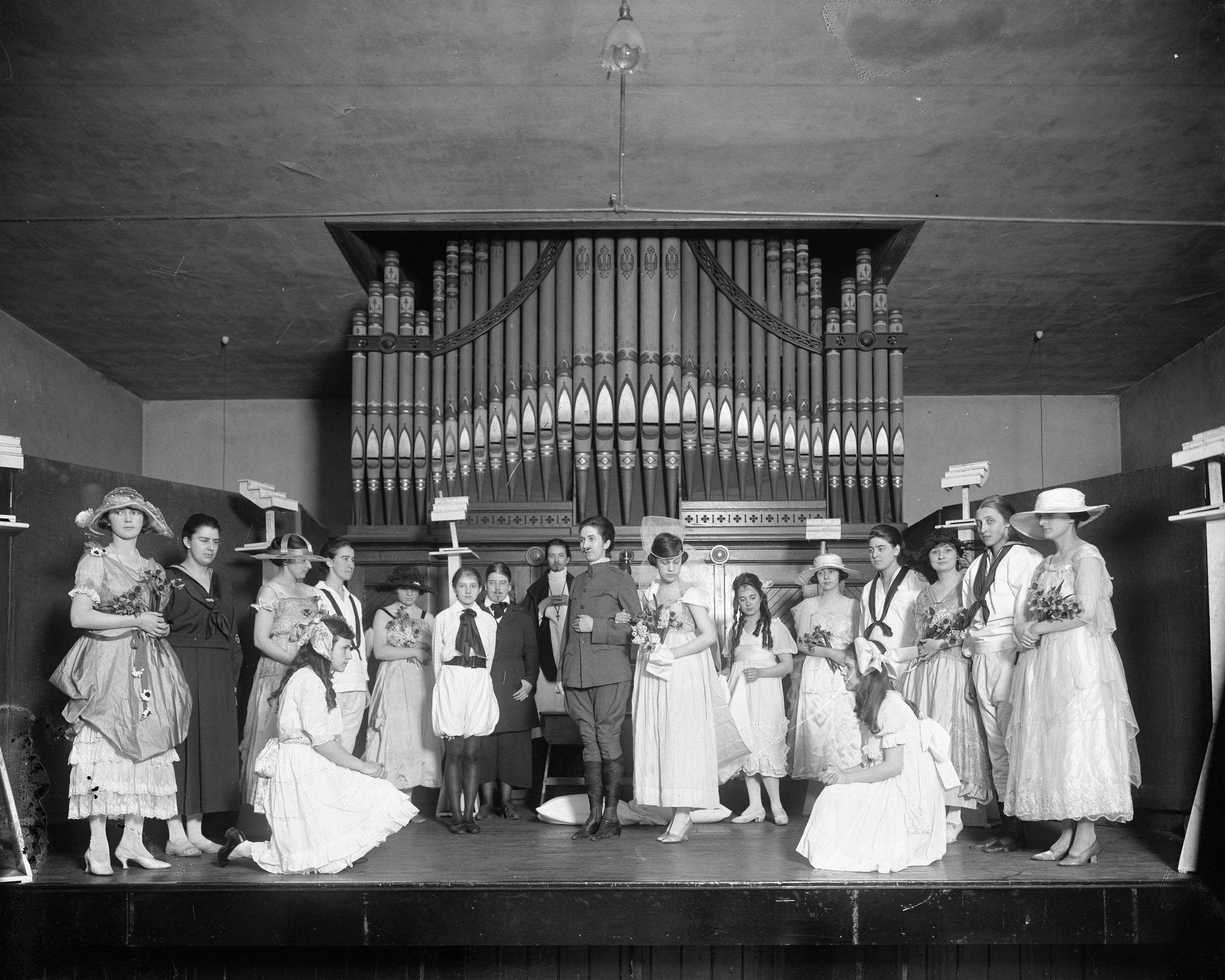
Group of student actors c. 1910s

Peace donated 8 acres (32,000 m^{2}) for the campus site. Main Building, a red brick, white-columned Greek revival building, was built between 1859 and 1862, but was commandeered by the Confederate States government early in the American Civil War to be used as an army hospital. The Main Building was designed and built by the Holt Brothers, Thomas and Jacob, who were notable builders from nearby Warrenton, NC.

The Civil War and Reconstruction Era delayed the opening of the school, but Peace Institute opened in January 1872. The first president was John Burwell, assisted by his son Robert. The Burwells, and his successor, James Dinwiddie, served the school until 1910, and were strong Presbyterians and descendants of old Virginia families.

The name of the school changed from Peace Institute to "Peace College" in 1943.

A member of the Women's College Coalition, Peace College was one of the oldest institutions of higher education for women in the United States. It was the second-oldest in North Carolina, predated only by Salem College (the first school for girls in the United States, founded in 1772).

=== Name changes ===
The school began admitting men in the fall of 2012. Initial announcements of the change included a controversial promise to "offer select single-gender courses in targeted disciplines, where research shows that women and men learn differently and that each benefit from a single-gender classroom," a plan that critics believe may run afoul of equal opportunity laws such as Title IX, Concurrent with its announcement that it will begin admitting men, Peace College changed its name to "William Peace University" in 2011, but the class years of 2012, 2013, 2014, and 2015 had the option to receive diplomas from Peace College or William Peace University.

==== Timeline of name changes ====
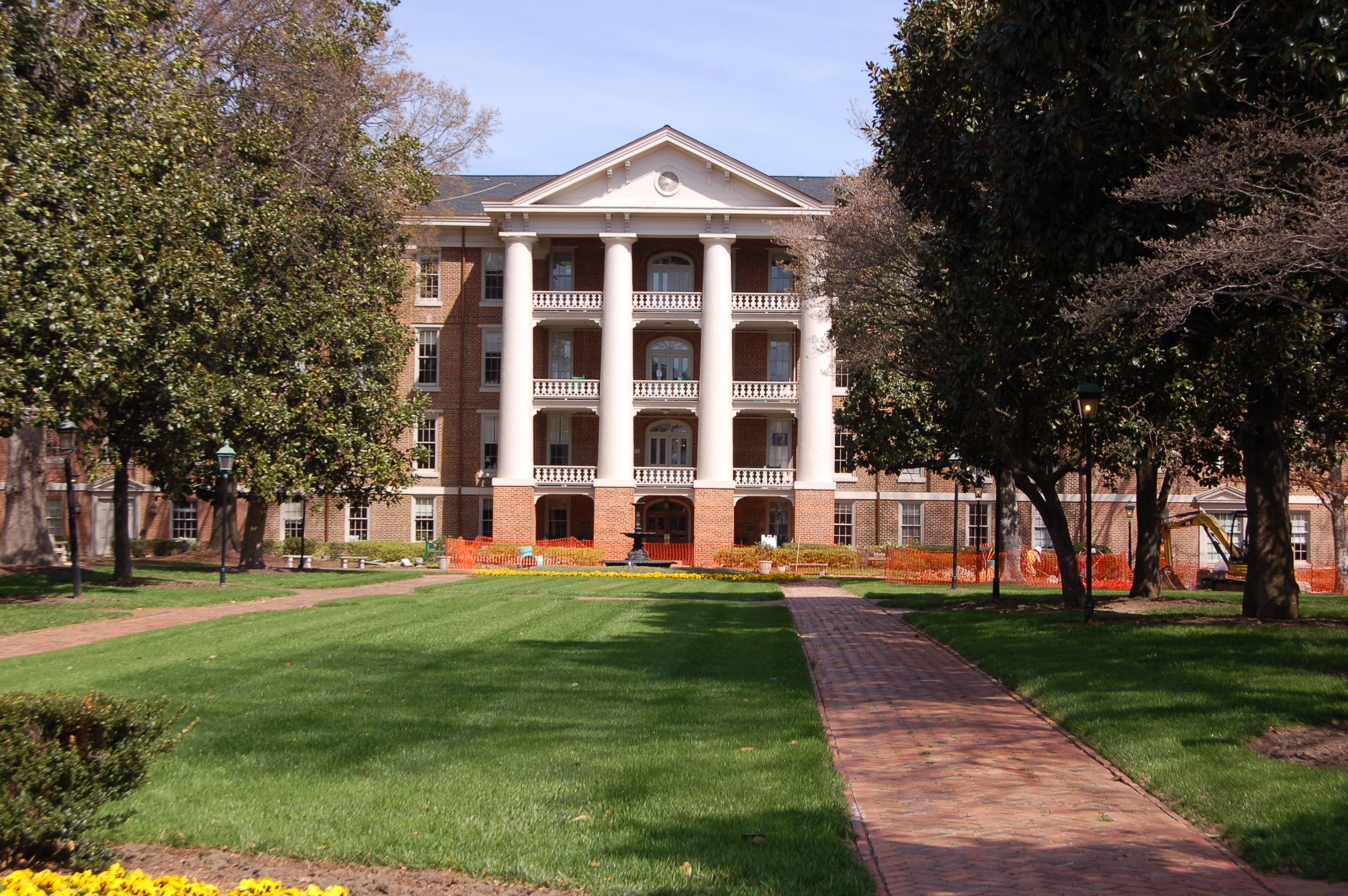
Main Building

- Peace Institute (1872–1930), Awards first junior college degrees in 1925
- Renamed in 1930: Peace, a Junior College for Women
- Peace Junior College renamed Peace College in 1943
- Peace College accredited by SACS in 1947
- Peace College adds the School of Professional Studies in 2009 (which admits men)
- Peace College renamed William Peace University, July 2011

University president Brian Ralph said on March 22, 2022, that "listening sessions" were planned to determine whether the university's name should be changed again. A statue of Peace was taken down that same day because Peace owned slaves and a major campus building was built with slave labor.

=== Becoming coeducational ===
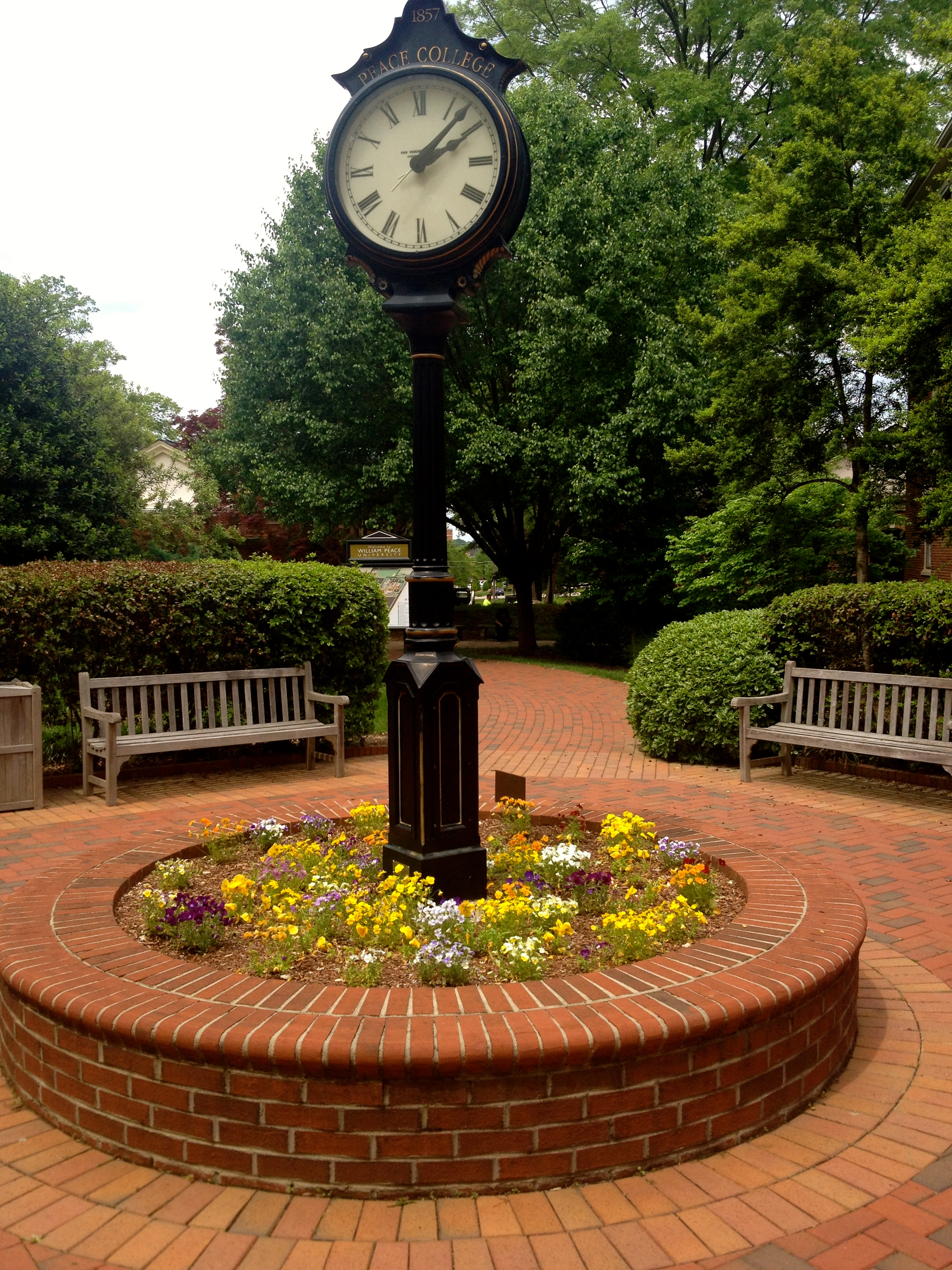
William Peace College courtyard

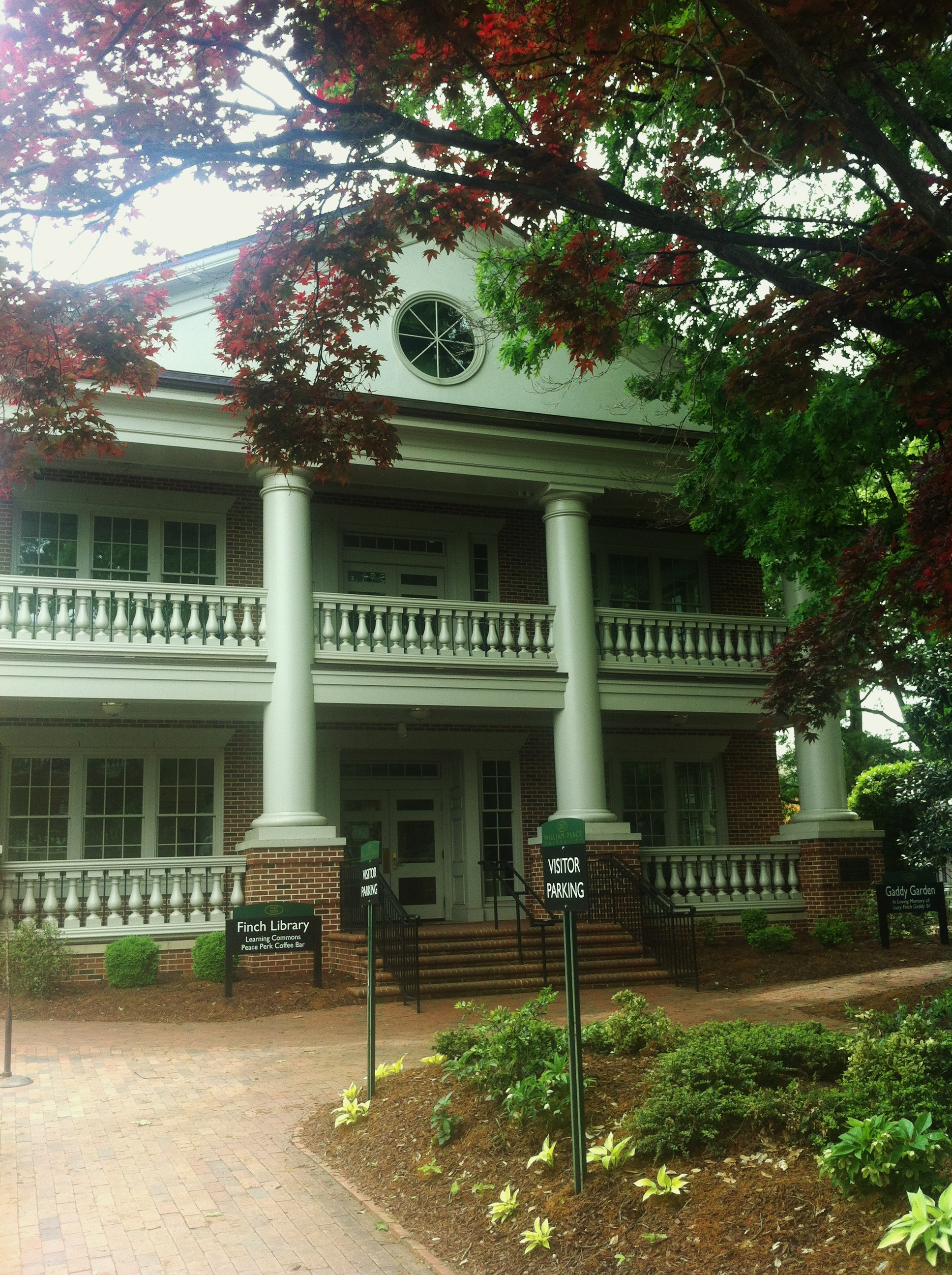
Library located towards the front of campus

The college has always educated women, with the only exception being the admittance of some boys in primary grades from its opening years through the 1920s when the school served levels from kindergarten through junior college years. Today, the college maintains records of nearly 10,000 living alumnae, including many who were pioneers in public service. In the 1930s, Gertrude Dills McKee, a graduate of the 1890s, became the first woman elected to the North Carolina Senate. Lilly Morehead Mebane was one of the first women elected to the North Carolina House of Representatives. Jane Simpson McKimmon became the youngest graduate of Peace College, when she finished the then two-year college program at age 16; she later became the first woman to graduate from NC State University. McKimmon became a leader in "home economics" and greatly advanced the state agriculture department's home extension service. NC State University's conference and continuing education center is named for her and the chair of Peace's Leadership Studies program is named for McKimmon. Addie Worth Bagley Daniels, the spouse of Raleigh News & Observer publisher Josephus Daniels, served for many years during the first half of the 20th century on the Peace College Board of Trustees, a rare role for women in that era.

The administration announced it planned to begin admitting male students at the start of the fall 2012 semester. It was determined that this transition would make the college a more attractive option for potential applicants, stating that only 2% of female applicants are likely to consider applying to a women's college, whereas 98% would only consider attending coeducational institutions.

== Academics ==
As an exclusively undergraduate college, Peace offers only bachelor's degrees. All traditional undergraduate candidates must complete an internship.

== Athletics ==
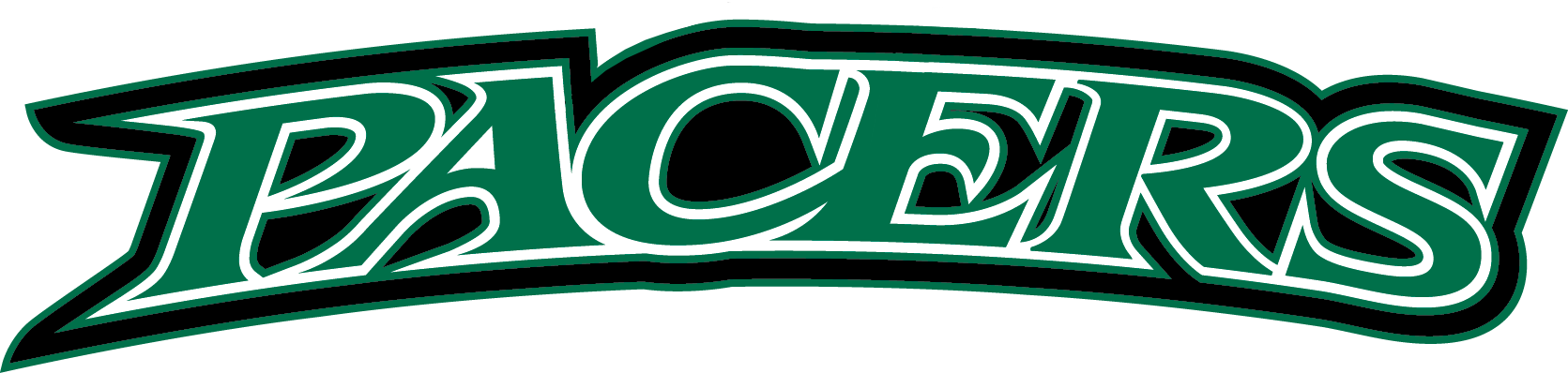
William Peace athletics wordmark

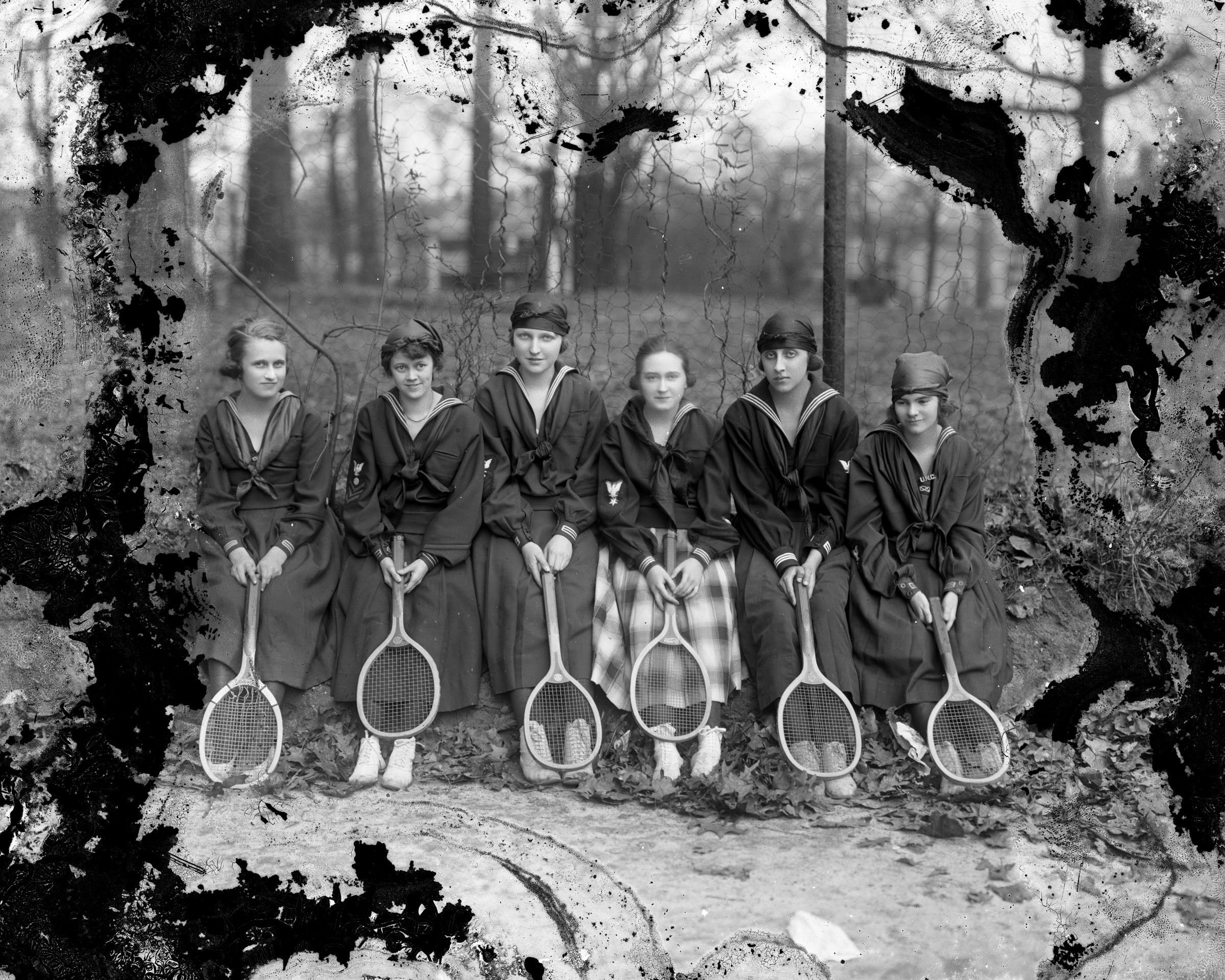
Women's tennis players, 1900s

William Peace University competes in the USA South Athletic Conference as a Division III school in the NCAA. Teams are fielded in basketball, cross country, softball, soccer, tennis, volleyball, swimming, track and field, and lacrosse.

William Peace fields men's sports in baseball, basketball, cross country, golf, lacrosse, soccer, swimming, tennis, and track and field.

Peace has been a full member of the NCAA since 2002, after having been granted provisional membership in 1995. Prior to that, Peace had competed in Region X of the NJCAA dating back to 1973. USA South membership was granted in 2003, making it the first women's college in the state to join a co-educational conference.

== Notable alumni ==
- Lisa Stone Barnes (born 1966), businesswoman, politician, and member of the North Carolina General Assembly
- Mary Lily Kenan Flagler Bingham (1867–1917), philanthropist and heiress
- Alice Willson Broughton (1889–1980), First Lady of North Carolina
- Carrie Lougee Broughton (1879–1957), North Carolina State Librarian
- Addie Worth Bagley Daniels (1869–1943), suffragist, writer, and socialite
- Eleanor Layfield Davis (1911–1985), painter
- Fortune Feimster (born 1980), actress and comedian
- Gail Godwin (born 1937), writer
- Isabelle Bowen Henderson (1899–1969), portraitist and floriculturist
- Mary Hilliard Hinton (1869–1961), historian, painter, and anti-suffragist
- Gertrude Dills McKee (1885–1948), politician and member of the North Carolina State Senate
- Jane Simpson McKimmon (1867–1957), writer and educator
- Lily Morehead Mebane (1869–1943), politician and relief worker
- Jacqueline Novogratz (born 1961), businesswoman and writer
- Annie Land O'Berry (1885–1944), philanthropist and activist
- Agnes Sanford (1897–1982), writer
- Lura S. Tally (1921–2012), politician and member of the North Carolina General Assembly
- Faye Young (1956–2015) and Kaye Young (1956–2010), identical twins and professional basketball players
