= Annie Land O'Berry =

American activist (1885–1944)

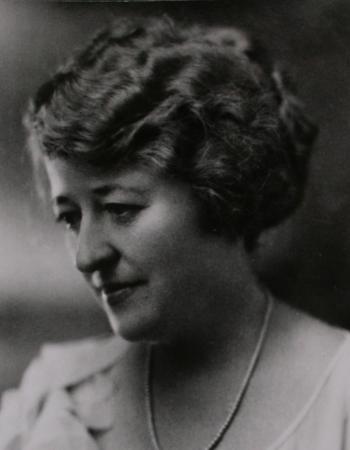
- Born: May 28, 1885; Edgecombe County, North Carolina
- Died: February 4, 1944 (aged 58); Baltimore, Maryland
- Education: Littleton College, William Peace University, Columbia University

Annie Land O'Berry (1885–1944) was an activist, relief worker, and philanthropist from North Carolina. O'Berry was a native to North Carolina, growing up in Edgecombe County on a farm with her family. She was involved in women's clubs and an open member of the Democratic party. More specifically, O’Berry's endeavors in the North Carolina Emergency Relief Association, North Carolina Democratic Party, League of Women Voters, and the Women's Missionary Society at her local Presbyterian Church demonstrated her dedication to serving her community. As an academic, O'Berry was named the first honor graduate from Peace University.

== Early life and education ==
Annie Land O’Berry was born on May 28, 1885, in Edgecombe County, North Carolina, to V.W. and Mary Dawson Mayo Land. O’Berry grew up on her family plantation and enjoyed playing outdoor sports until the age of 13, when her parents died and she moved to live with her older sister in Littleton. From a young age, O’Berry was interested in and excelled at school. In grammar school O’Berry attained high marks and continued on to study at Littleton College. She then attended the William Peace University, graduating as the first honor graduate.

After graduation, O’Berry moved in with her brother, Edward Land, in Kinston. There, O’Berry was an active member of the Presbyterian Church where she organized Sunday School and was chairman of the Women's Missionary Society. On December 14, 1909, Annie Land married Thomas O’Berry and soon after they moved to Goldsboro, North Carolina. Throughout her career, O’Berry advocated for education and aspired to end adult illiteracy. In addition, as O’Berry focused on relief in her own community, she took a course on social work at Columbia University.

== Philanthropy ==
While living with her brother in Kinston, O’Berry was very active in the North Carolina Federation of Women's Clubs. She became the first chair of the Anti-Tuberculosis Committee of Wayne County where she was the president for two years. O’Berry gave her time and effort to what was then called the Charity Organization of Goldsboro. She later went to Columbia University in order to learn more about this type of work. O’Berry also helped her father-in-law, Captain Nathan O’Berry of Goldsboro, raise over $5,000.00 to help white collar people during the depression. As a result, Governor Angus McLean appointed her to the commission to Study County Government and the North Carolina Historical Commission. O’Berry also worked in the Goldsboro Club in Women's Club Work. She was elected vice-president of the State Federation in 1923 and, in 1927, was elected president.

O’Berry's literacy committee sponsored an Educational Pilgrimage to Washington. It was recognized as one of the most outstanding projects of adult education in the United States. She was later named the vice-chair of the state executive committee of the Democratic Party in 1930. Three years later, in 1933, O’Berry became one of the few women to administer a state emergency relief agency as she became the administrator of the Civil Works Commission. The Civil Works Commission later became the North Carolina Emergency Relief Administration (NCERA). O’Berry continued to remain in-charge of an offshoot of NCERA, called the Rural Rehabilitation Corporation, until her death. This offshoot provided loans to farmers. Through her diplomacy, O’Berry provided both direct and indirect relief to many citizens.

== Legacy ==
O’Berry worked to help clubwomen overcome indifference to civic responsibility. She inspired them to be civic-minded and to work for the advancement of adult education. She was viewed as ‘the little soldier,’ ‘relief lady,’ and a symbol of ‘food for the hungry, homes for the weary and a new chance for the discouraged.’ Although she had no children of her own, O’Berry raised her grand-nephew and grand-niece as her own.
