= Lura S. Tally =

American politician (1921–2012)

Lura Cowles Self Tally (December 9, 1921 – August 28, 2012) was a politician and educator from North Carolina, who served five terms in the North Carolina House of Representatives and six terms in the North Carolina Senate. She is a graduate of Duke University and holds a master's degree from North Carolina State University. The Lura S. Tally Center for Leadership Development is based at Methodist University in Fayetteville, North Carolina.

== Life ==
Lura Self was born in Statesville, North Carolina, to Robert Ottis and Sarah Cowles Self on December 9, 1921, and she grew up in Raleigh, North Carolina. She attended Peace College for two years before transferring to Duke University, where she graduated with a degree in English in 1942. While at Duke, she met her future husband, J.O. Tally, Jr. of Fayetteville, North Carolina, who would go on to become that city's mayor.

After raising two sons, she returned to school at N.C. State University, where she received a master's degree in education. In 1972, she ran for a seat in the North Carolina General Assembly, and she became the first woman ever elected from Cumberland County. After five terms in the House, she ran for N.C. Senate in 1982. She served in the Senate for 12 years, serving as the chair of the Education Committee and the Committee on the Environment. She retired from the legislature in 1994, as the longest-serving female legislator in state history. Tally continued to serve the state at the N.C. Museum of Natural History until 2003.

== The Lura S. Tally Center for Leadership Development ==
Methodist University honored Tally by naming its Center for Leadership Development after her. Its website provides the following summary of her accomplishments:

Tally continues her lifelong leadership contribution as a mentor to students in the Leadership Program at Methodist University. Tally was the first woman elected to the North Carolina legislature from Cumberland County. She served 22 years in the North Carolina House and Senate, where she emphasized programs to serve education and young people, as well as to protect North Carolina's environment. A recipient of numerous awards and commendations for her leadership, she has initiated and supported growth of significant components of community life, such as the county's Mental Health Center and scouting. She currently holds a gubernatorial appointment with the North Carolina Museum of Science. Clearly, Tally is one of Fayetteville's special treasures, and Methodist University is proud to honor her and her leadership by naming the Leadership Program for her.
