= Jane Simpson McKimmon =

Agriculture educator from North Carolina

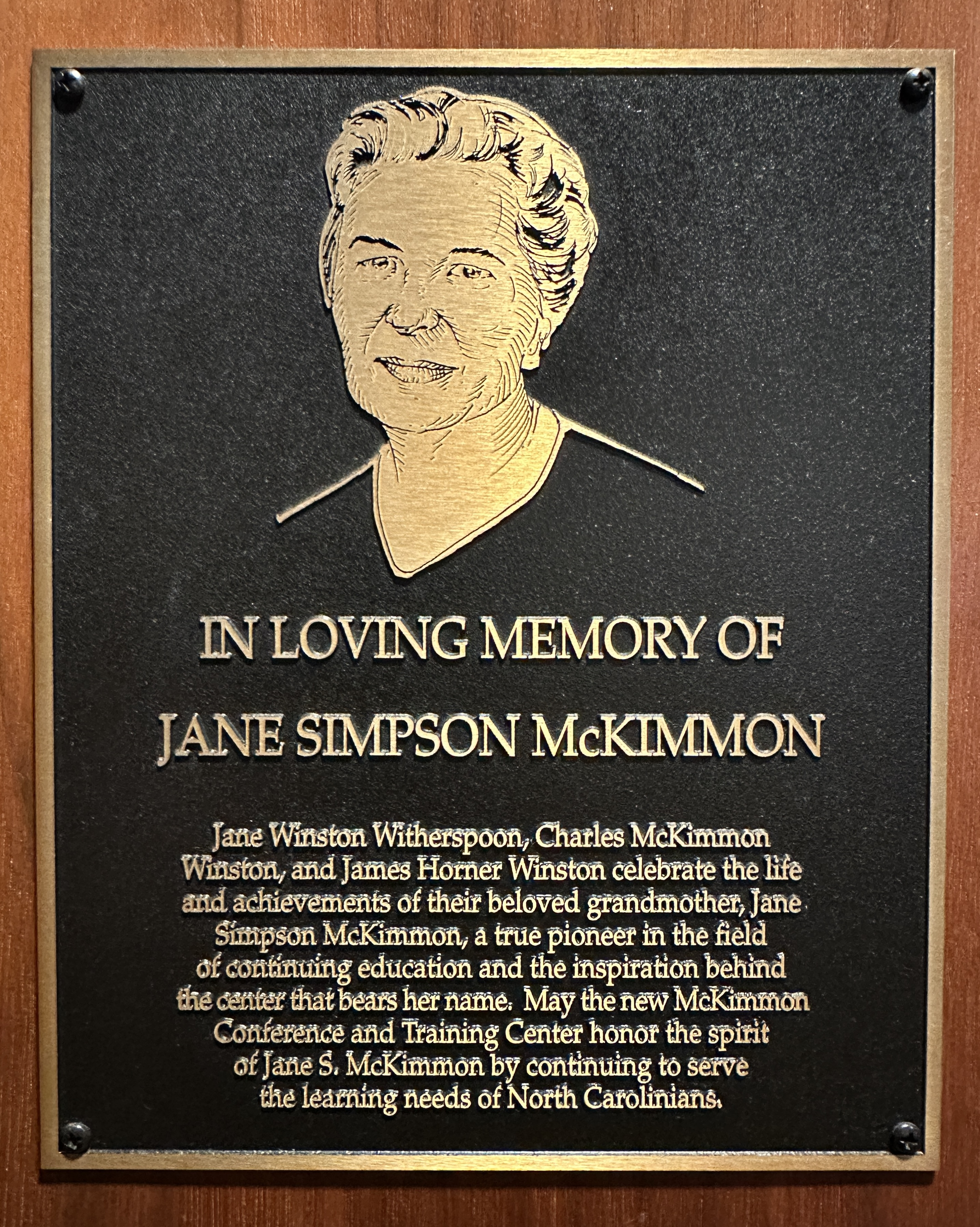
- A memorial plaque for McKimmon at her namesake center in NC State University
- Born: November 13, 1867; Raleigh, North Carolina
- Died: December 1, 1957 (aged 90); Raleigh, North Carolina
- Education: William Peace University

Jane Simpson McKimmon (November 13, 1867 – December 1, 1957) was an American author and agricultural educator, civic leader, state home demonstration agent, and director of women's institutes.

== Early life ==
She was born and raised in Raleigh, North Carolina, on November 13, 1867. She was the oldest of nine children born to William and Anne Cannon Shanks Simpson. Her mother, Anne Cannon Shanks, had moved to Raleigh from Glasgow, Scotland. Jane grew up in a house of strong Christian beliefs. When she was 19, she married 40-year-old Charles McKimmon, a local business owner. Together, they had four children.

Jane Simpson attended public school for four years and spent another five years at the Peace Institute in Raleigh. She devoted one year to studying art and graduated from Peace at 16. At age 60, McKimmon obtained a B.S. degree from State College in 1926 and an M.S. degree in 1929. She received an honorary LL.D. in 1934 from the University of North Carolina, which recognized her contributions to education.

== Career ==
In the early 1900s, McKimmon trained home demonstration agents to work with farm women. While farmers were learning new principles of scientific agriculture to improve their crop production, McKimmon and her home demonstration agents were striving to create new ways to increase female participation in agricultural life. When she took over the program in 1911, it consisted of 416 farm girls in 14 countries. Thirty years later, membership reached 70,000 across 100 countries. She traveled across the state of North Carolina recruiting farm girls to join tomato clubs. She also advocated for African-American women to be permanently hired as home demonstration agents.

In 1917, she was appointed by Governor Thomas W. Bickett to help direct the food conservation program established during World War I. During World War II, Governor J. Melville Broughton appointed her to the State Council for National Defense.

In 1945, University of North Carolina Press published her book, When We're Green We Grow, about home demonstration work in North Carolina.

== Legacy ==
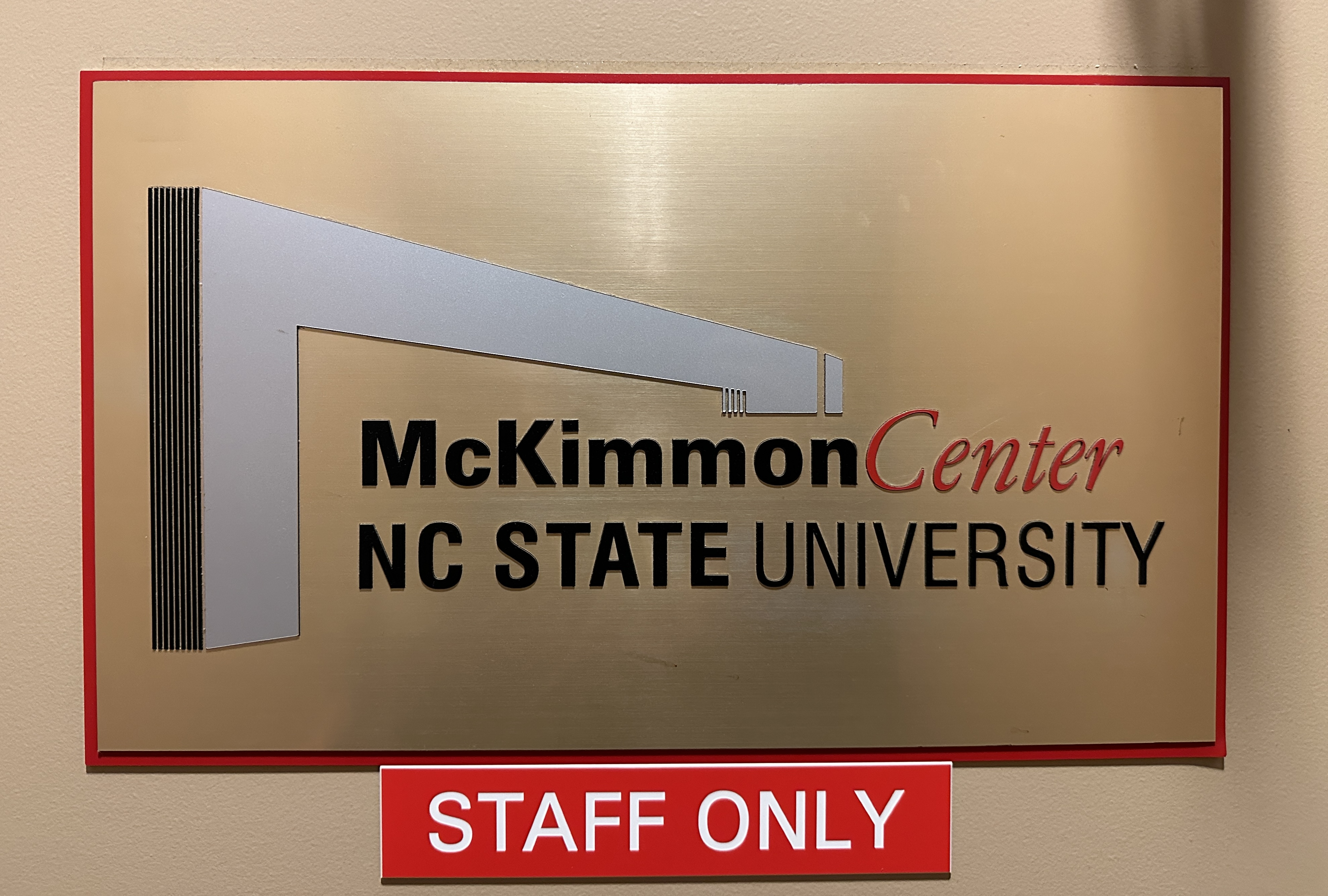
A sign for the Jane S. McKimmon Center

- 1927: North Carolina home demonstration agents established the Jane S. McKimmon loan fund.
- 1947: McKimmon's portrait was presented by the North Carolina Agriculture Extension workers at State College.
- 1966: McKimmon was the first woman elected to the Agricultural Hall of Fame.
- 1976: The Jane S. McKimmon Center for Extensions and Continuing Education was completed at North Carolina State University.
