= Ella Graham Agnew =

American educator and social worker

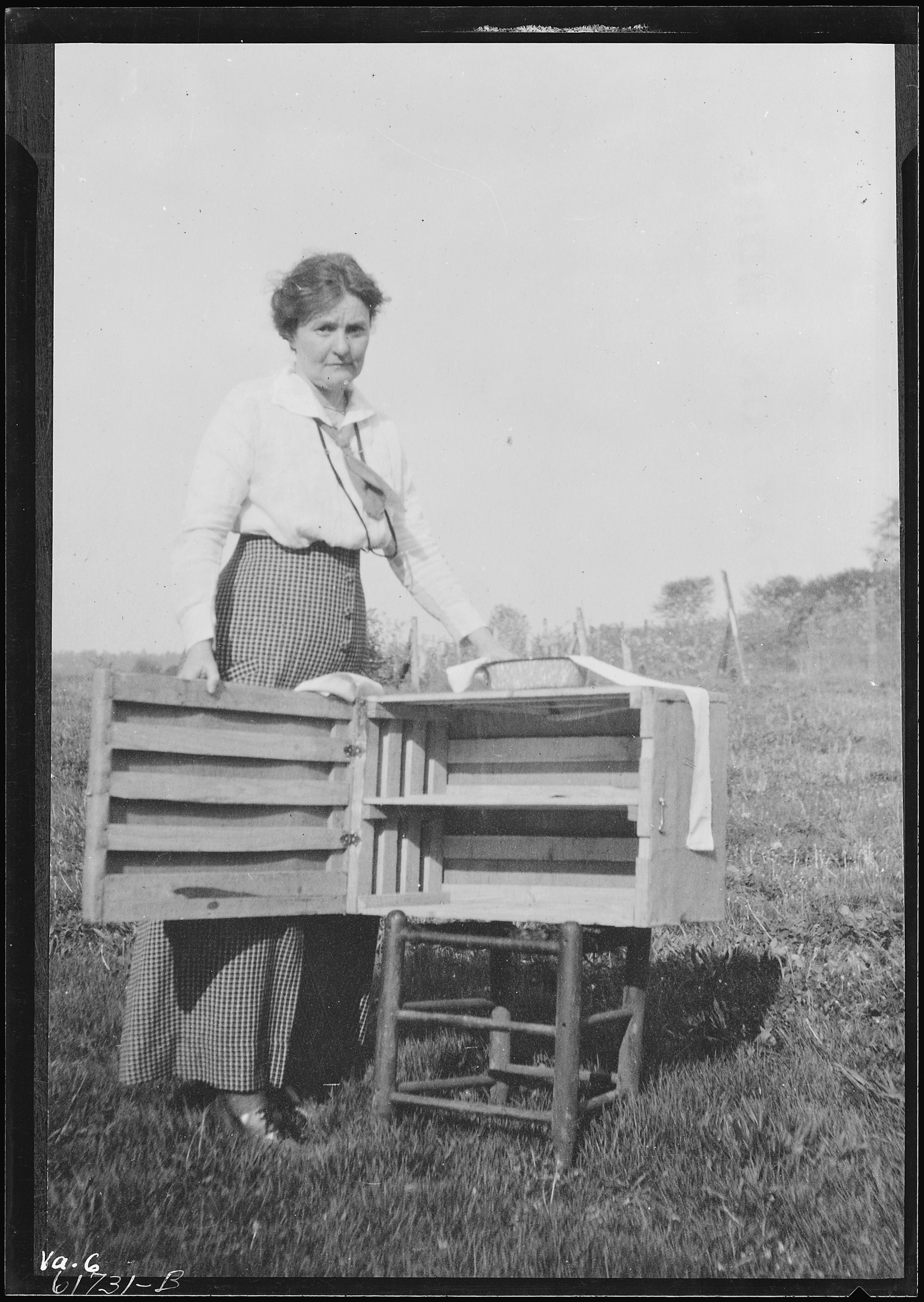
- Born: March 18, 1871; Prince Edward County, Virginia, US
- Died: February 5, 1958 (aged 86)
- Education: Smithdeal Business School
- Known for: First woman named a field demonstration agent by the United States Department of Agriculture
- Honours: Certificate of Merit from Virginia Tech (1926); Agnew Hall on the campus of Virginia Tech is named in her honor Virginia Women in History (2000); Historical marker in Crewe, Virginia; Scholarship through The Virginia Association For Family and Community Education, Inc.

Ella Graham Agnew (March 18, 1871 – February 5, 1958) was a Virginia educator and social worker. She was the first woman named a field demonstration agent by the United States Department of Agriculture, and later occupied high-level positions supporting the New Deal.

== Life and career ==
Agnew was born at the family home, Roseland, in Prince Edward County, Virginia, ninth of ten children born to Dr. James Anderson Agnew and Martha Chaffin Scott Agnew. The house soon burned, and the family moved to Burkeville, in neighboring Nottoway County. There her mother died after giving birth to another daughter, Anne Virginia, known as "Jean". Dr. Agnew married again, to Elizabeth McLean, who would raise Ella after the doctor died in 1879.

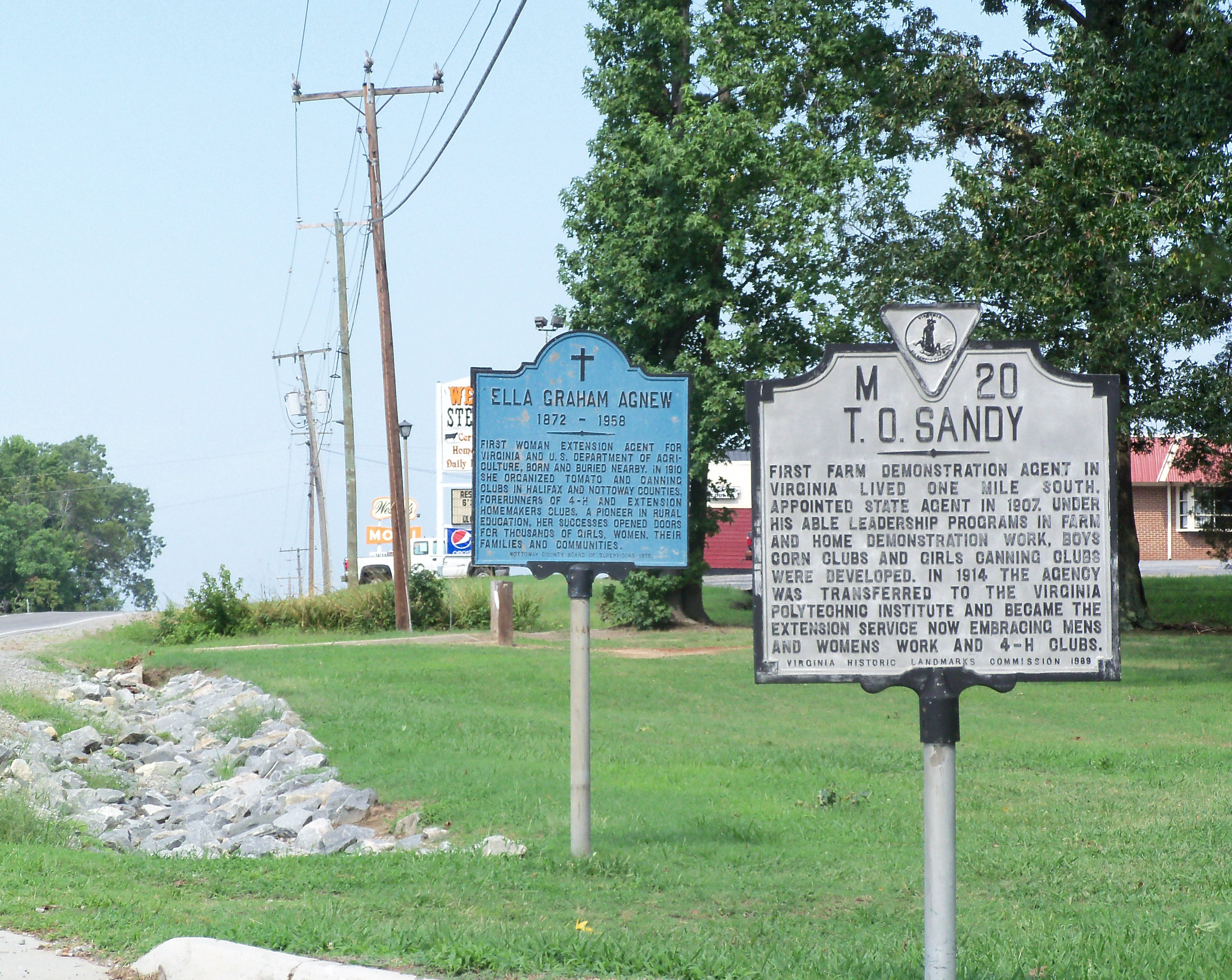
Historical marker honoring Ella Graham Agnew in Crewe

Agnew began her education in local schools in Nottoway County before studying stenography at Smithdeal Business College in Richmond. In 1892 she took a position as secretary at the Stonewall Jackson Institute, a women's college in Abingdon. In 1894 she moved to Long Island to work at a publishing firm. The following year she migrated to South Africa, where she had accepted a position teaching business and working as a secretary in Paarl, at the Huguenot Seminary. She would stay in South Africa for five years, until the Boer War necessitated her return to the United States. For two of those years she was principal of the Amajuba Seminary in Wakkerstroom. After this was closed by the war, she spent time providing assistance to the Boers and doing clerical and administrative work at the American consulate. During her time in South Africa Agnew also became involved in the student Christian movement.

Agnew continued her professional life upon her return from Africa; she worked as a teacher in Virginia, an office manager in New York, and general secretary of a number of Young Women's Christian Association chapters. She also continued her education via correspondence courses during this time. She returned to Virginia to begin a system of professional training for rural girls; supported by the state superintendent of education, Joseph D. Eggleston, and agriculturist Seaman A. Knapp, she began implementing her ideas in 1910 in Nansemond and Halifax Counties with the creation of tomato and canning clubs. She was soon named the first female home demonstration agent in the country. her role has been described as a precursor to modern 4-H and Extension Homemaker clubs. In 1914, upon the organization of the Cooperative Extension Service, she was assigned to Virginia Tech, as it was the primary land-grand school in the Commonwealth. In 1919 she was named the first president of the Virginia Federation of Business and Professional Women's Clubs. After ten years in the position she left to work for the YWCA's national board, as a member of the finance department, in which role she traveled the country raising money and developing plans to fund local YWCM chapters. In 1927 she took a job as the first female editor of the "Women's Department" of Southern Planter magazine, remaining there until 1931. From 1933 until 1943 she headed New Deal relief activities for women in Virginia for both the Federal Emergency Relief Administration and the Works Progress Administration; she was instrumental in developing programs which allowed women to contribute to various New Deal programs, even though she was unable to persuade the Civilian Conservation Corps to develop female-only camps. Women under her purview were hired to build bird and wildflower sanctuaries, and she created "sewing rooms" where women, black and white, could make clothes for the needy or costumes for pageants and National Park Service reenactors. At the disbanding of the WPA in 1943 she retired, but continued in civic life.

Agnew died in Richmond in 1958.

== Honors and legacy ==
Agnew received a Certificate of Merit from Virginia Tech in 1926; she was the first woman to receive the award. Agnew Hall on the campus of Virginia Tech is named in her honor; the first building on campus to be named for a woman, it was completed in 1940 and christened in 1949. She was recognized as one of the Virginia Women in History for 2000, the inaugural year of the program. A historical marker in Crewe, Virginia details her accomplishments. A scholarship in her honor exists as well, offered by The Virginia Association For Family and Community Education, Inc. and designed to aid a Virginia student studying nursing or another medical profession.

Agnew's papers are held by the Library of Virginia and Virginia Tech Special Collections and University Archives.
