= Home demonstration clubs =

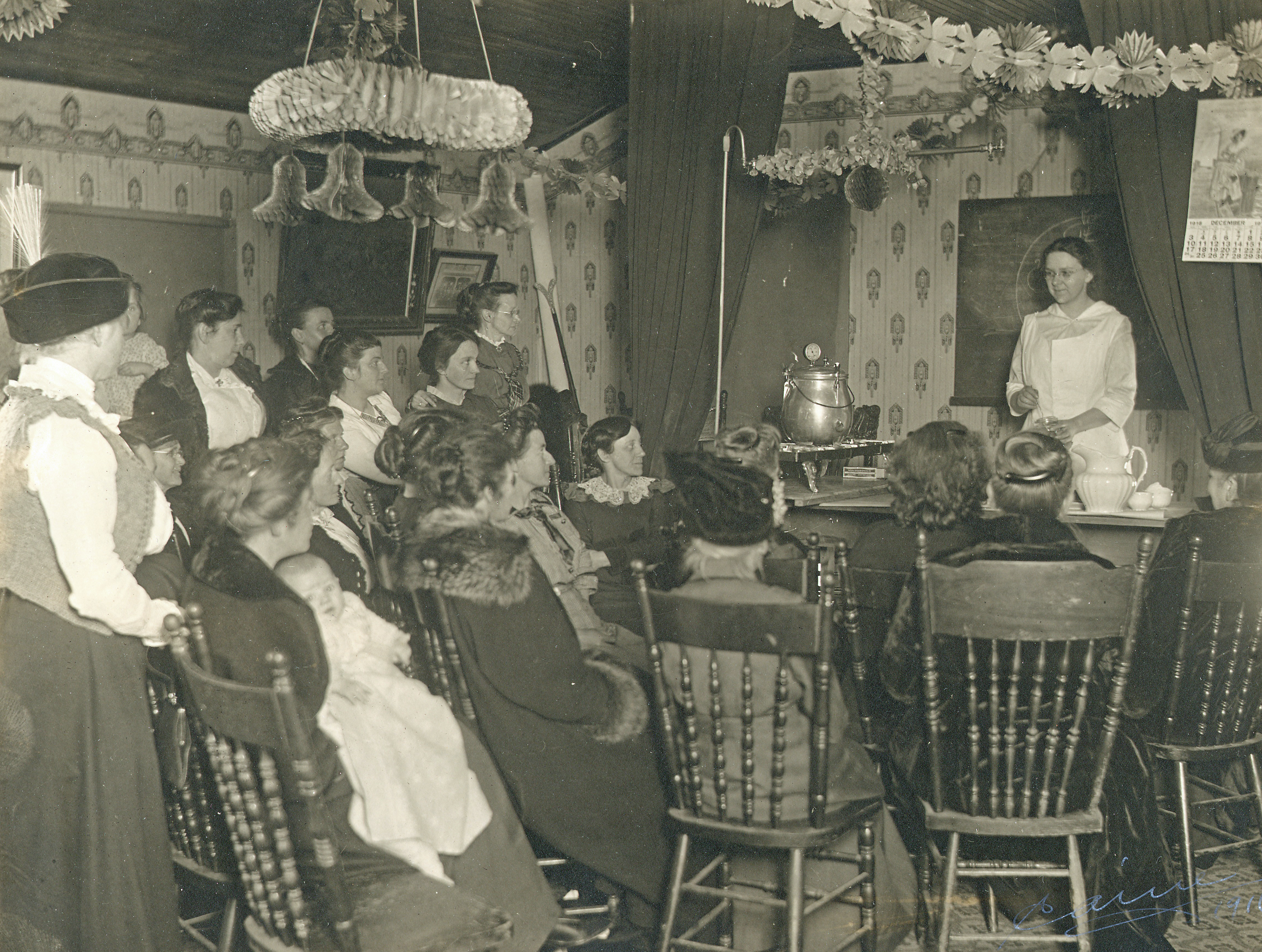
Meat canning demonstration at meeting of the Akron Home Economics Club on December 19, 1916.

Home Demonstration Clubs (also known as homemaker clubs, home bureaus or home adviser groups) were a program of the U.S. Department of Agriculture's Cooperative Extension Service. Their goal was to teach farm women in rural America better methods for getting their work done, in areas such as gardening, canning, nutrition, and sewing, and to encourage them to improve their families' living conditions. Home demonstration agents worked with local clubs to provide teaching services. The clubs also took on other education and charitable roles. These clubs survive into the present day.

== About ==
Home demonstration clubs were an extension of Progressive Era values. The clubs were meant to help improve the lives of women living in rural areas. People who were considered experts in various topics were brought into the clubs to teach and were called Home demonstration agents. Topics covered included domestic skills, issues relating to family life, home economics and information about new technologies and goods of interest to rural women. Part of the purpose of the clubs was to make the same kind of information found at colleges and universities available to rural women. Clubs also helped raise the standards of living for members of the group. Clubs also helped women have a sense of community with others and pride in their own work. Some clubs worked together to raise money to help improve their communities. Many women enjoyed the leadership opportunities the home demonstration clubs provided them.

Clubs were sometimes known as Homemakers clubs, home adviser groups and home bureaus. Clubs were often named after geographic areas, but some had unique names, such as O.N.O. (Our Night Out) and H.E.O. (Help Each Other). Clubs elected officers and often rotated to different members' homes. Members of the clubs worked with home demonstration agents to choose topics of interest to the clubs. Clubs also had a social element with members hosting baby showers and birthday parties. The first week of May was proclaimed "National Home Demonstration Week".

Clubs in most states were part of a larger county organization that was then organized by state and finally, part of the organization, the National Home Demonstration Council. Clubs could get a home demonstration agent to work with them by contacting their local state agricultural college or the county's agricultural agent.

=== Home demonstration agents ===
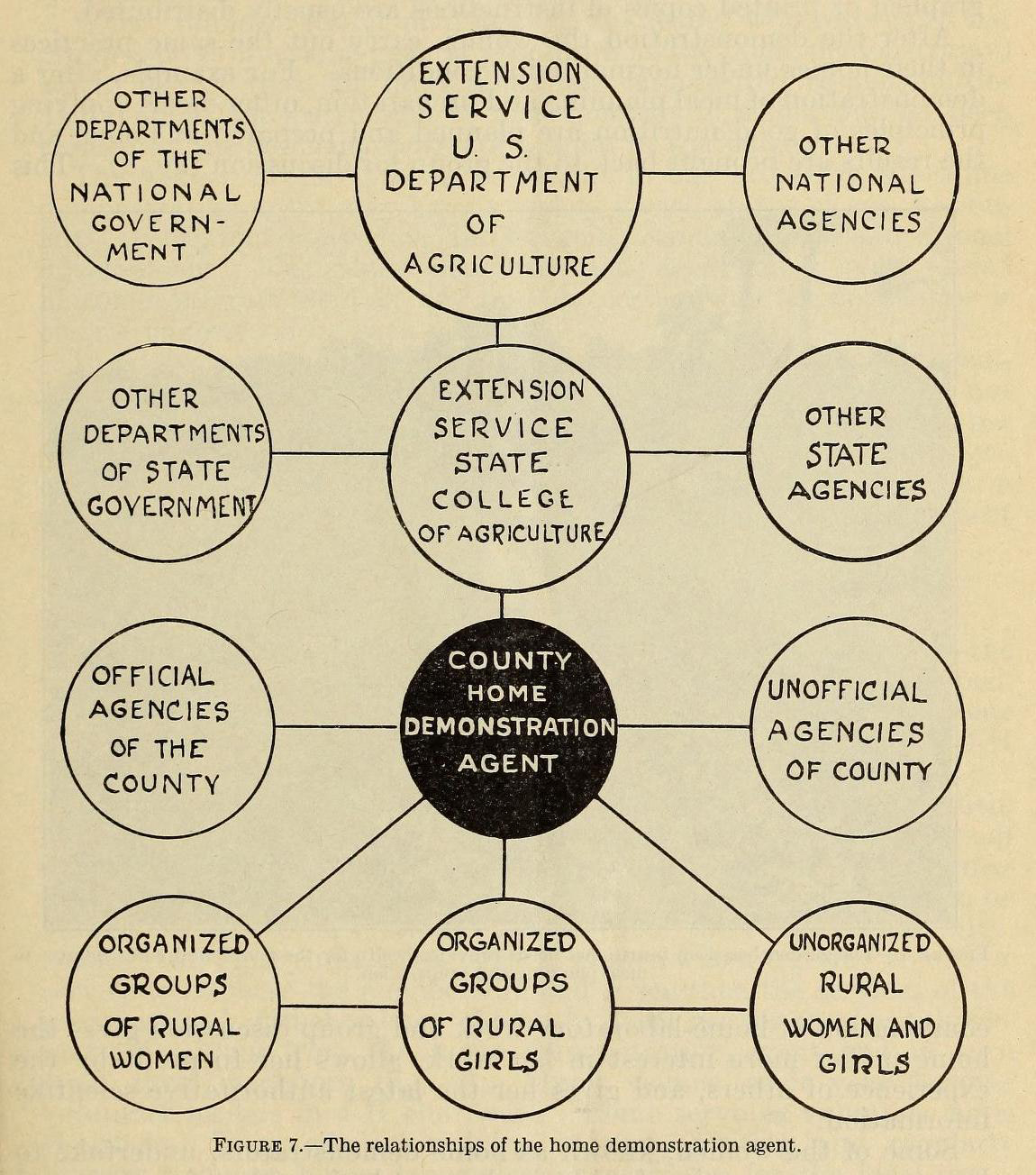
Fig 7 Home Demonstration Agent Relationships, from the 1933 USDA publication Home Demonstration Work

Home demonstration agents were considered to be the local representatives of individual states' county extension services and of the USDA. They were employed to teach different skills inside of the home, outdoors or in the community. Home demonstration agents were required to have at least a bachelor's degree in home economics, although that requirement had been waived in the past. Home demonstration agents would work with clubs by making home visits. Agents also had office hours, wrote articles, conducted workshops and lectures, and had office hours. Agents felt that their jobs were to provide information, but not to provide "judgment". Agents, especially ones working black communities, understood the importance of building a rapport with their communities and worked to gain trust.

In Mississippi, almost a quarter of all agents working in the 1920s had been part of the early tomato clubs that preceded the idea of home demonstration clubs.

In 1922, the General Federation of Women's Clubs had a "special work" project of Vice President Mrs. W.S. Jennings, "A Home Demonstration Agent in Every County".

During the Great Depression, home demonstration agents were often able to provide help to families in need.

== History ==
Home demonstration clubs started before 1911. In 1898, women in Illinois recommended that farmers' institutes include "special subjects for farmers' wives and daughters". Other early prototypes of the Home demonstration clubs were the reading clubs set up for rural women starting in 1900 in New York. Two women, Marie Cromer and Ella Agnew, started early canning clubs in North Carolina and Virginia respectively. In Texas, Edna Westbrook Trigg worked with the USDA and girls' tomato clubs in 1912. A similar path was taken by Susie V. Powell in Mississippi, who was working with the Mississippi Federation of Women's Clubs to set up girls' tomato clubs in 1911. Tomato clubs like the ones started by Powell and Trigg were part of a Progressive Era movement to help improve the quality of life for rural women and bring home economic concepts into their homes. States like North Carolina found that there was a need to organize the successful tomato clubs at a state level, and hired Jane S. McKimmon in 1911 to do that work. In 1914, Mrs. Miller Earle was organizing tomato clubs for black girls in South Carolina. Prior to home demonstration agents working with rural black women, Jeanes teachers from the Jeanes Supervisor teacher program traveled between farms and taught home economics and agricultural skills.

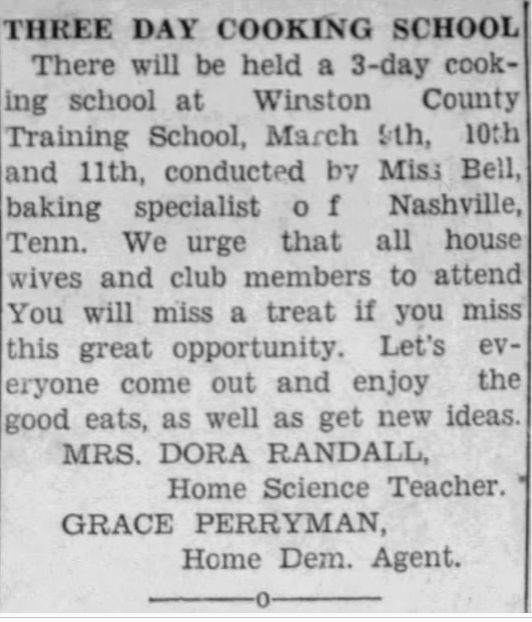
Advertisement for home demonstration event in Winston County, Mississippi in 1931.

In 1914 the Smith-Lever Act made national funds available for the home economics, including home demonstration agents. The act provided both legal and financial backing for home demonstration clubs. By 1951, there were 60,361 home demonstration clubs.

During World War I, home demonstration clubs worked with food conservation programs. Emergency funds were appropriated in order to hire more home demonstration agents during WWI. Out of these funds, many African American agents were hired and after 1920, when the emergency funds were no longer needed, white agents asked that black agents continue to be hired. McKimmon was one of the women who worked to keep on African American agents full time. Throughout World War II, clubs were involved in efforts such as victory gardens and victory canning. In South Carolina, more than 17,500 black women and girls were involved in producing and conserving food during WWII.

The first agent in Arkansas was Emma Archer, who organized club for in Mabelvale, Arkansas to teach food preserving using canning in 1912. Four years later she became the state agent supervised district organizers. The system was racially segregated whilst black women agents taught black urban women in largely non-white areas, white women agents supervised other black clubs. In 1918, Edith Parrott, who supervised home demonstration work in South Carolina, said that while white women could help black families, the work could only be done "properly" if black agents served black families. Negro extension work was funded at a lower rate than programs for white people and black women's extension services received less funding than black men's services. Black demonstration agents were also paid around half of what white women earned for the same work. In some cases, the difference between the salaries of white and black home demonstration agents was even more pronounced. For example, in Winston County, Mississippi, Olga B. Hughes, the white home demonstration agent received a salary of $150 per month in 1931, while Grace Perryman, her black counterpart, received only $25 per month in the same year.

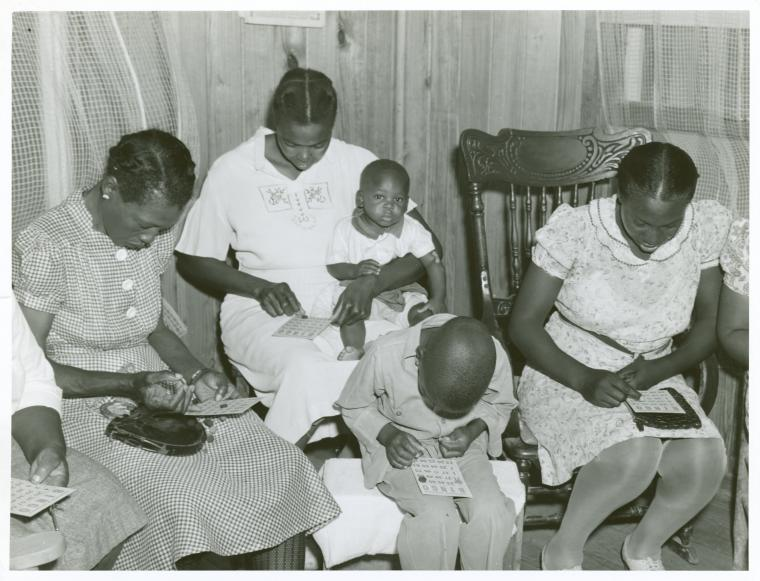
Louisiana home demonstration club meeting has games and refreshments after a discussion, 1940.

Connie J. Bonslagel served as Arkansas' state-level agent from 1917 to 1950, and Mary L. Ray was the Negro District home demonstration agent from c.1918 until 1934. Both served until their deaths. The first Negro home demonstration agent worked in Okfuskee and Seminole counties in Oklahoma and was hired in 1912. In Texas, Mary Evelyn V. Hunter worked as the statewide home demonstration agent for black women from 1915 to 1931.

The clubs sometimes met in rural schoolhouses, such as the Galen Elementary School in Macon County, Tennessee.

Home demonstration agents serving rural women overlapped with 4-H clubs, including in Montana. In 1951, 540 different home demonstration clubs employed 4H agents.

== Notable people ==
- Ella Graham Agnew, home demonstration agent in Virginia.
- Lassie Goodbread-Black, home demonstration agent in Florida.
- Virginia Cutler, home demonstration agent in California.
- Fabiola Cabeza de Baca Gilbert, home demonstration agent in New Mexico.
- Agnes Ellen Harris, first home demonstration agent in Florida.
- Jane McKimmon Simpson, home demonstration agent in North Carolina.
- Marion Walker Spidle, home demonstration agent in Alabama.
- Helen Harrod Thompson, home demonstration agent in Oklahoma.

== See also ==
- Agricultural extension
- Cooperative extension service
- Women's Institute
