= Galen Elementary School =

- U.S. National Register of Historic Places
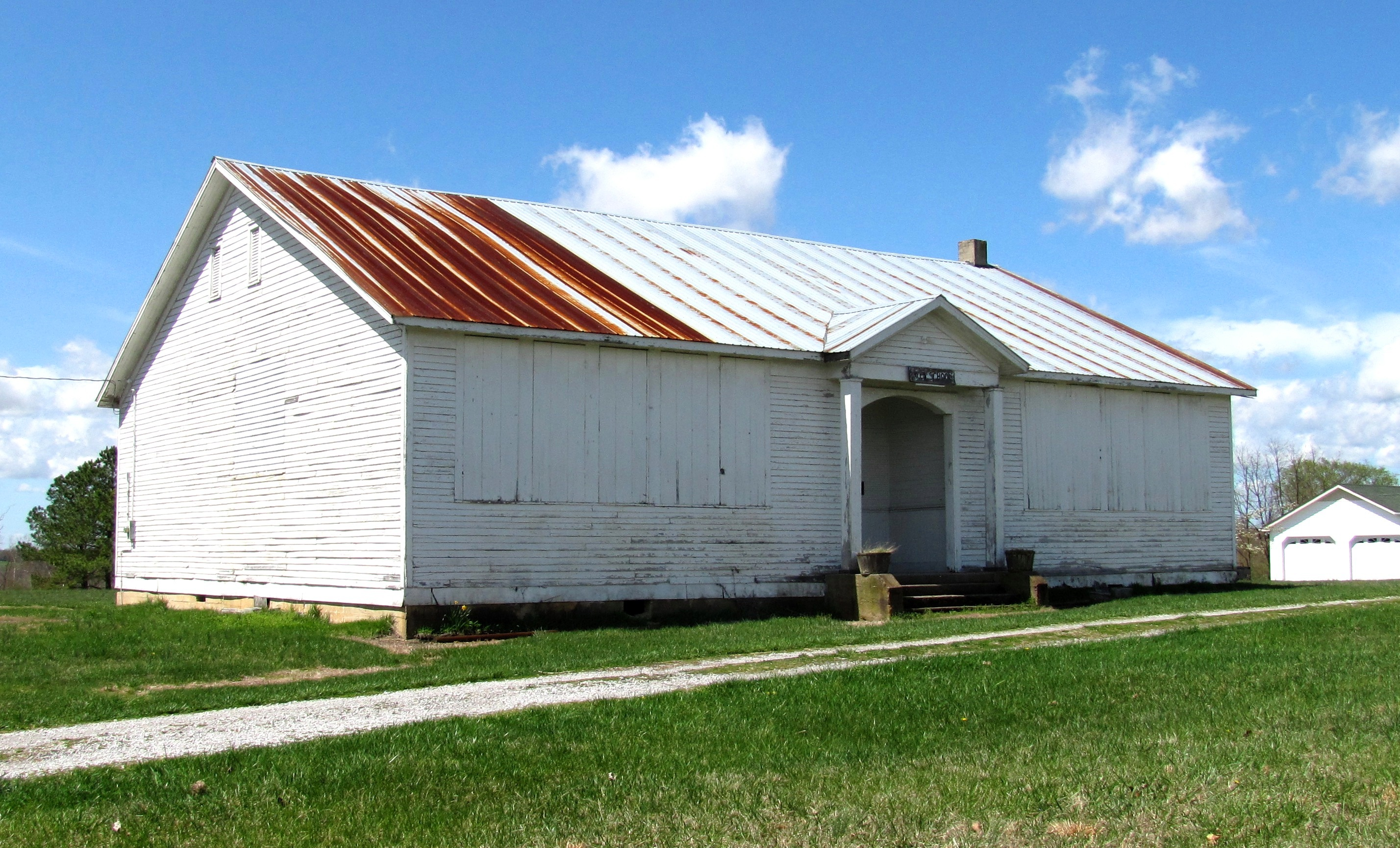
- East-facing front facade, in 2010. Windows are boarded over.

- Location within Tennessee
- Location: Junction of Galen and Tucker Roads, Galen, Tennessee
- Coordinates: 36°34′37″N 85°57′44″W
- Area: 1.5 acres (0.61 ha)
- Built: 1928-29
- Built by: Jimmy Bohanon
- Architectural style: Schoolhouse
- MPS: Education Related Properties of Macon County MPS
- NRHP reference No.: 93000030
- Added to NRHP: February 22, 1993

The Galen Elementary School is a historic building in Macon County, Tennessee. It was built by Jimmy Bohanon in 1928–29. It was a two-year feeder high school until 1960, when it closed down. One of the teachers was Harold Blankenship, who was interviewed in 1991. The building has been listed on the National Register of Historic Places since February 22, 1993.

It was built to a standard design for a two-year high school with grade school, which would have four classrooms, specifically plan 3-B for a "Three-teacher school". The plan was adapted somewhat, and one of the four classroom areas was split into a smaller classroom, a cloakroom, and a teacher's room. The standard plan specified that the building was "To Face East or West Only" and has classroom windows only on those sides; this implementation in fact faces east. When it opened it used one room for grades 1–4, another for 5–8, one for 9, and one for grade 10. Blankenship reported it never was used for a high school that students would graduate from, but rather served as an elementary school in its later years.

The school was the first rural school in Macon County to have hot lunches, which started in 1941, with conversion of the small classroom into a kitchen. Also,

When the first sanitation officers were appointed for the county the Galen School was a forerunner in sanitation. The old dipper water bucket method of dispensing water was replaced by a hand pump at the well. A concrete dispenser was built to hold an iron pipe with a half dozen holes placed in the pipe. When the pump was pumped the water was forced through the iron pipe, the water spurted up through the holes in the pipe and about 6 students could drink without having to drink in a unsanitary manner.

It was in use as a rural schoolhouse until 1960. After that, it served as a community center, as a voting precinct, and as a meeting place for groups such as Home Demonstration Clubs.

It was deemed significant "as an excellent example of a local interpretation of a state school plan".

== See also ==
- Belview School, a two-teacher schoolhouse also NRHP-listed, also in Macon County
