= Belview School =

- U.S. National Register of Historic Places
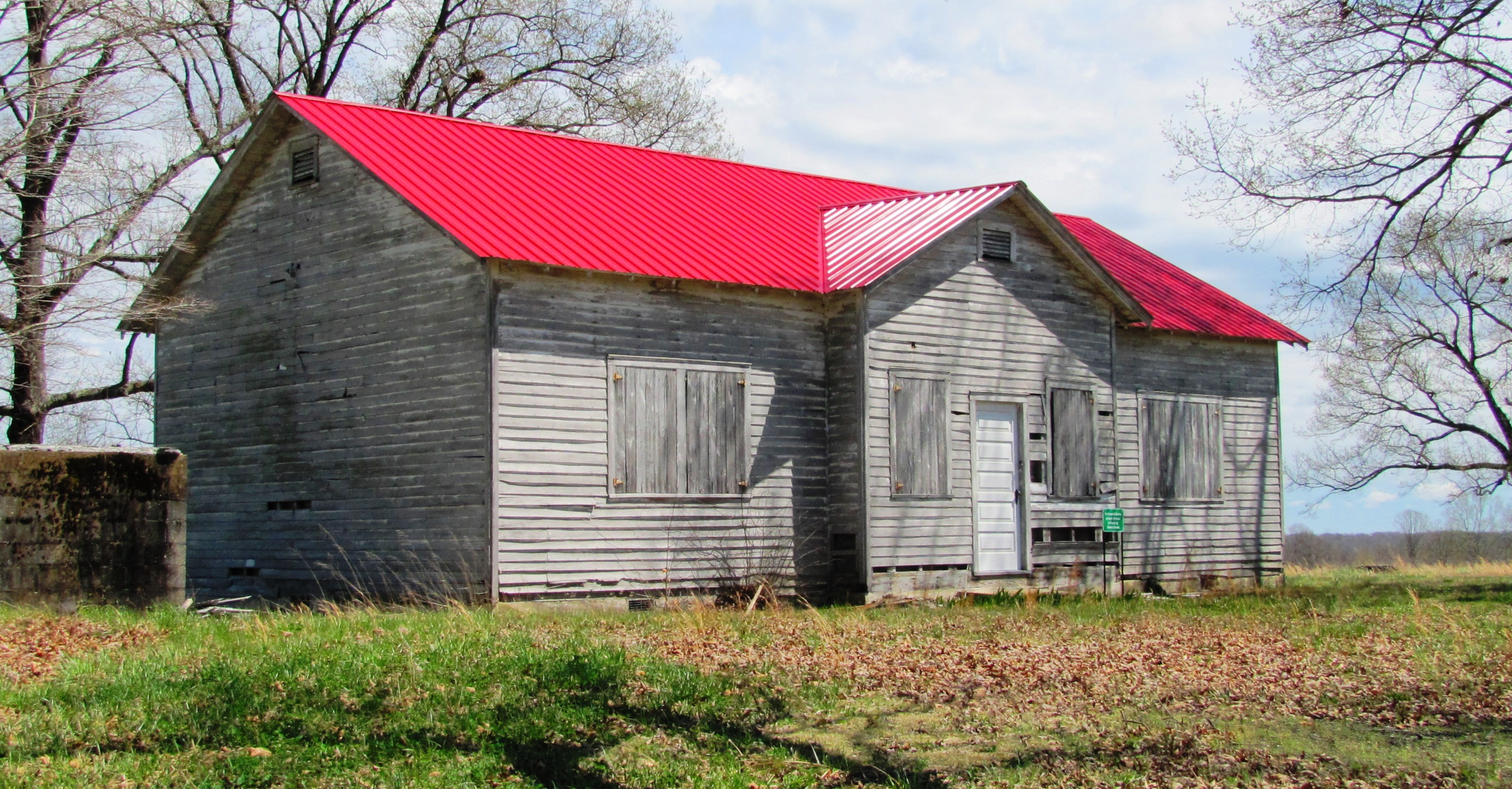
- The building in 2010. Windows are boarded over.

- Location within Tennessee
- Nearest city: Underwood, Tennessee
- Coordinates: 36°36′45″N 85°59′17″W
- Area: less than one acre
- Built: 1936
- Built by: Leo Butrum
- Architectural style: T-plan School
- MPS: Education Related Properties of Macon County MPS
- NRHP reference No.: 07000189
- Added to NRHP: March 21, 2007

The Belview School is a historic building in Macon County, Tennessee, United States.

The school was built by Leo Butrum in 1936, and the first teacher was Lewis Bandy. It was named for Mr Belview, a teacher from Kentucky who taught at the original Belview School on Puncheon Creek Road in the 1890s. The school closed down circa 1959, and it was later used as a community meeting place. It has been listed on the National Register of Historic Places since March 21, 2007.

It was built to a standard plan for a two-teacher rural schoolhouse.

== See also ==
- Galen Elementary School, another NRHP-listed schoolhouse in Macon County
