= Helen Harrod Thompson =

- Born: Oklahoma City, Oklahoma
- Education: University of Oklahoma, East Central State University
- Known for: co-creator of Family Shelter for Victims of Domestic Violence, creator of Senior University

Helen Harrod Thompson is the co-creator of the Family Shelter for Victims of Domestic Violence in Ardmore, Oklahoma. In 2006, Thompson was selected to create Senior University, a program that gained national recognition by the Association for Continuing Higher Education as an Adult Model Program. Thompson was inducted into the Oklahoma Women's Hall of Fame in 2011 for her career focused on the welfare of children, domestic violence and abuse prevention.

== Early life ==
Helen Harrod Thompson was born in Oklahoma City, Oklahoma, where she lived for all of her childhood. Thompson attended Northeast High School and after she graduated, moved away to Staunton, Virginia to attend Mary Baldwin College. She attended the college for a year, then moved back to Oklahoma, where she completed her undergraduate education at the University of Oklahoma. Thompson majored in home economics and became a home demonstration agent.

== Career ==
After graduation, Thompson became a Home Service Consultant for OG+E. She would travel to homes and schools, where she would ademonstrate how to use and cook on the all new electric range. Thompson was married for several years, quitting the work force and having children, (Note: Helen's husband was John Jack Miller Thompson, Jr. (1930-2009), an Ardmore homebuilder and realtor. He and Helen had two sons who survived their father.) before eventually getting a divorce and returning to school to earn her master's degree in counseling and administration. She became an elementary counselor and was with that school district for 22 years. A little later Thompson went into administration and community education within that district where she incorporated an Even Start program. Thompson was also involved with the C/SARA (Crisis Support and Resources Association) foundation, a non-profit that helps with training adults at schools on how to deal with the students' crises. Around 2000, they developed the Child Advocacy Center in Ardmore, also called "Sara's House."

== Post-retirement ==
When Thompson reached the age of retirement in 2006, The Ardmore Higher Education center, asked her to join its team in creating what became known as the "Senior University," a program that gained national recognition by the Association for Continuing Higher Education as an Adult Model Program.

Thompson has also served as a trustee and officer of the Children's Shelter, YWCA, and the Greater Southwest Historical Museum. In 2011, she was inducted into the Oklahoma Women's Hall of Fame. As of 2011, she was actively involved in legislative and legal matters of concern to citizens of Oklahoma.
