= Helen Thompson =

Helen Thompson may refer to:

- Helen Thompson (political economist), English academic
- Helen B. Thompson (1875-1969), American academic
- Helen F. Thompson, American businesswoman and politician
- Helen Harrod Thompson, co-creator of the Family Shelter for Victims of Domestic Violence
- Helen Taylor Thompson (1924–2020), co-founder of Europe's first AIDS hospice
- Helen Thompson (Doctors), a character on the TV series Doctors
- Helen Thompson Gaige (1890–1976), American herpetologist, born Helen Thompson
- Helen Cargill Thompson, Scottish scientist, librarian and art collector

== See also ==
- Helen Thomson (disambiguation)
