= Andrews-Duncan House =

Historic house in North Carolina, United States

- U.S. National Register of Historic Places
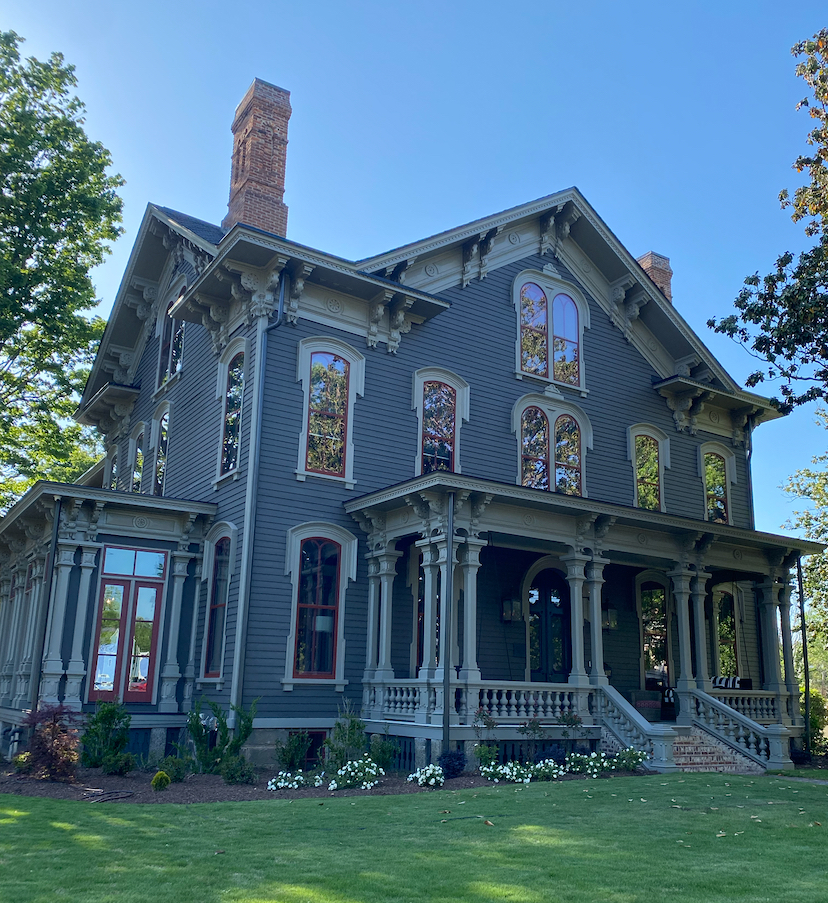
- Andrews-Duncan House, 2024

- Location within North Carolina Location within the United States
- Location: 407 North Blount Street; Raleigh, North Carolina, U.S.
- Coordinates: 35.78492°N 78.63654°W
- Area: 1 acre (0.40 ha)
- Built: 1874
- Architect: George S. H. Appleget
- Architectural style: Italianate
- NRHP reference No.: 72000998
- Added to NRHP: January 20, 1972

The Andrews-Duncan House is a historic house located at 407 North Blount Street in Raleigh, North Carolina, United States. Built in 1874 for a prominent businessman, the Italianate style home was designed by architect George S. H. Appleget. The house was added to the National Register of Historic Places (NRHP) in 1972 and is currently owned as a private residence by the Turpin-Konidaris Family. A large tree named after presidential candidate Henry Clay once stood behind the house and is commemorated with a historical marker.

== History ==
In April 1873, Alexander Boyd Andrews (1841–1915), a railroad executive and former Confederate captain in the 1st North Carolina Cavalry Regiment, bought a parcel of land from businessman Richard Stanhope Pullen of Pullen Plantation. The lot was located on the northwest corner of Blount and North Streets in downtown Raleigh. Andrews chose architect George S. H. Appleget to design his Victorian home. Appleget's designs in Raleigh include Estey Hall on the campus of Shaw University and the Heck-Andrews House, located next door to the Andrews-Duncan House. His most well known public building design is the Cabarrus County Courthouse in Concord. Andrews continued living in the home until his death in 1915. On October 1, 1919, the Andrews estate sold the home to Laura Duncan Pearson, the wife of a local dentist and widow of a tobacco industrialist. Ownership of the home remained in the Duncan family until at least the 1970s when the historical survey of the property was completed. The building used to serve as offices for North Carolina state government workers until 2007. It fell into disrepair under state ownership until early 2017 when it was bought by Tina Konidaris and Jeff Turpin. After extensive repairs their family moved into the house in 2023. Since then, it has become a private residence and has won multiple awards for historic preservation.

The house was added to the NRHP on January 20, 1972, and declared a Raleigh Historic Landmark on November 6, 1972. A historical marker in front of the building states: "Alexander B. Andrews/1841-1915/Railroad builder and financier. Vice-president, Southern Railroad; superintendent, North Carolina Railroad. Home is here."

=== Henry Clay Oak ===
The Henry Clay Oak in 1955.

A large white oak tree, nicknamed the "Henry Clay Oak", previously stood behind the home on the southwest corner of the property. It measured approximately 100 feet (30 m) tall with a 100-foot spread and was estimated to be anywhere from 200 to 350 years old. The tree was famous for supposedly being the site where in 1844 politician Henry Clay wrote his letter opposing the annexation of Texas. The publication of that letter was one of the main reasons he lost the 1844 presidential election. Due to weather damage and a deadly root fungus, the tree was felled in October 1991. Two historical markers in front of where the tree once stood state: "Henry Clay Oak/Henry Clay, on a visit to this city, wrote the famous Raleigh Letter, April 17, 1844, opposing the annexation of Texas. Many authorities believe that this statement cost him the presidential election of 1844. According to tradition Clay wrote the letter while sitting under this oak tree, in the yard of Colonel William Polk, at whose home he was a guest./Erected by Colonel Polk Chapter/D.A.R./1939" and "Raleigh/Historic Property/The Henry Clay Oak/Circa 1650"

== Architecture ==
The house is a 10,946 sq ft (1,016.9 m^{2}) two-and-one-half story building designed in the Italianate style. The basement walls are coursed stone and the building is covered with lapped siding. It features a gable roof with a false gable on the front and rear sides. The facade (east side) of the home is five bays wide. The double door entrance, topped by a two-light lunette, features vertical panels with etched glass and is framed by a ramped architrave and wooden hoodmold. The three central bays are covered by a hip roof porch supported by pairs of chamfered posts. A paneled frieze runs between pairs of brackets that are above each pair of posts. The second floor and gable central bay features a pair of round-headed windows. These windows are also found on the gable of the north and south sides. Those sides are four bays wide and feature windows similar to the ones on the facade. An enclosed addition is on the south side of the house. The rear (west side) of the home is five bays wide and features a porch similar to the one on the facade. There is a carriage house, also designed in the Italianate style, located directly behind the building.

== See also ==
- National Register of Historic Places listings in Wake County, North Carolina
