= WSHA =

WSHA may refer to:

- WSHA (FM), a radio station (89.3 FM) licensed to serve South Charleston, West Virginia, United States
- WRKV, a radio station (88.9 FM) licensed to serve Raleigh, North Carolina, United States, which held the call sign WSHA from 1968 to 2018
