= Frierson =

Frierson is a surname. Notable persons with that name include:

- Andrew Frierson (1924–2018), American operatic tenor
- Buck Frierson (1917–1996), American baseball player
- Eddie Frierson (born 1959), American actor
- Herbert Frierson (born 1958), American politician
- Jason Frierson (born 1970), American politician
- Leon Frierson (born 1986), American actor
- Marguerite Frierson (1907–1998), American educator
- Trina Frierson (born 1979), American basketball player
- William L. Frierson (1868–1953), American lawyer, judge and politician
- William Frierson Cooper (1820–1909), American lawyer, planter and politician

== See also ==
- Frierson, Louisiana, an unincorporated community and census-designated place (CDP) in DeSoto Parish, Louisiana, United States
- Frierson House, a historic house at 1112 South Main Street in Jonesboro, Arkansas
