= Banker's House =

Historic house in North Carolina, United States

- U.S. National Register of Historic Places
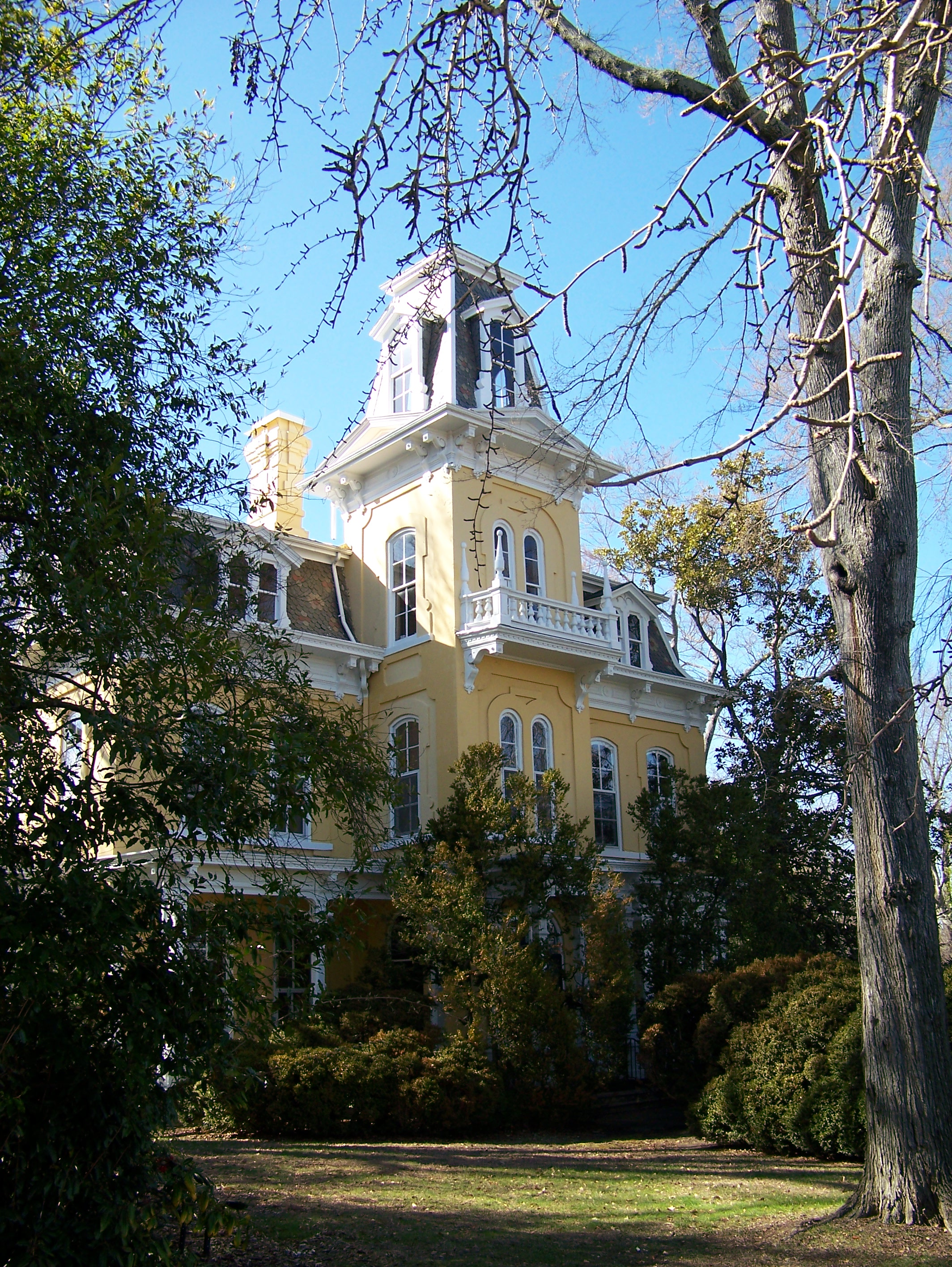

- Location within North Carolina Location within the United States
- Location: 319 N. Lafayette St., Shelby, North Carolina
- Coordinates: 35°17′44″N 81°32′22″W
- Area: 5 acres (2.0 ha)
- Built: 1875
- Architect: Appleget, G.S.H.
- Architectural style: Second Empire
- NRHP reference No.: 75001251
- Added to NRHP: May 6, 1975

The Banker's House is a historic home located at 319 N. Lafayette St. in Shelby, Cleveland County, North Carolina. It was designed by architect G.S.H. Appleget, and was built in 1874–1875. It is a 2 1/2-story, T-shaped, stuccoed brick house in the Second Empire style. It features a 3 1/2-story tower, with mansard roofs on the tower and main block. Also on the property is a contributing wellhouse and a one-story brick outbuilding.

It was listed on the National Register of Historic Places in 1975.
