= Estey Organ =

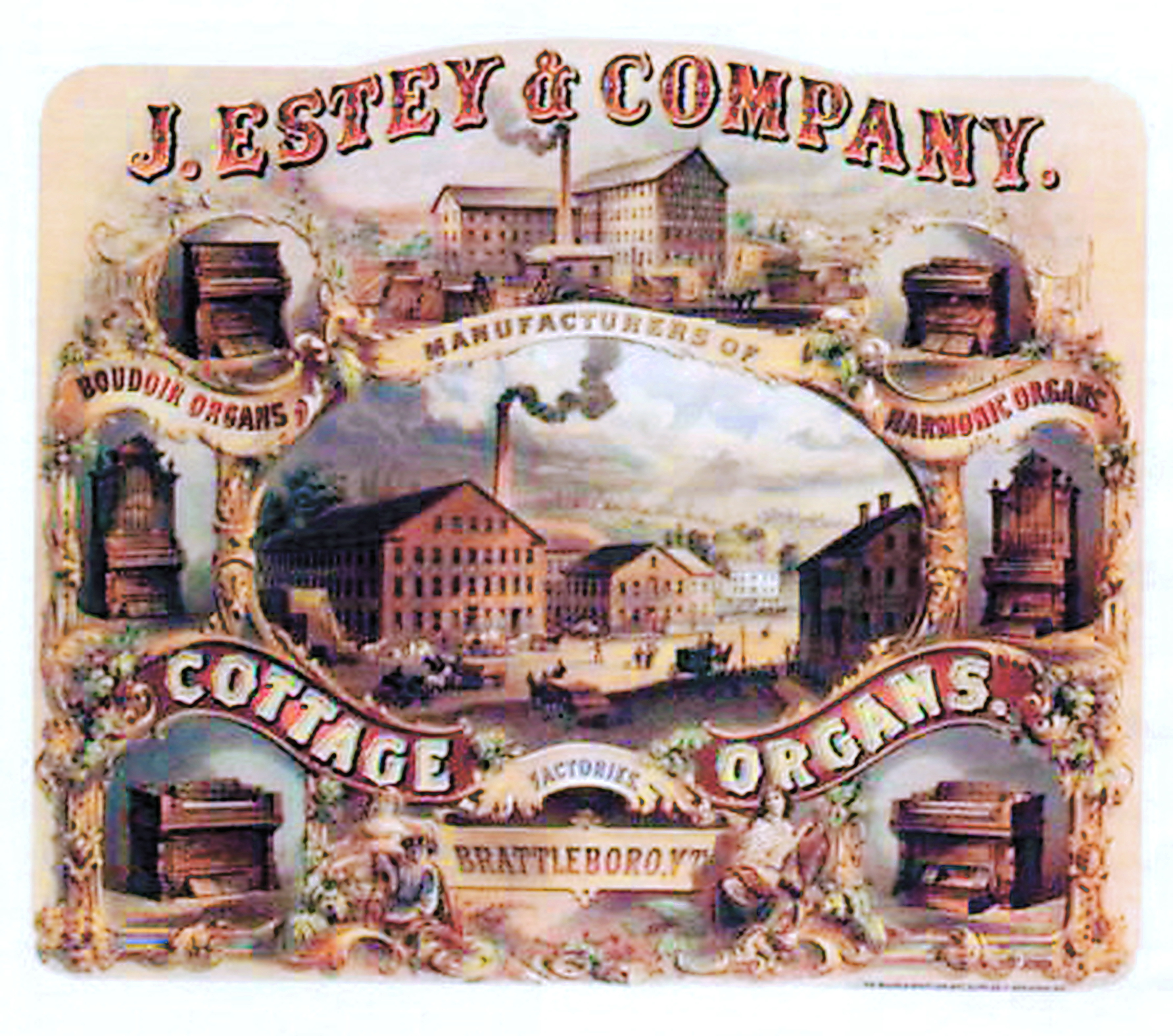
- Estey's advertisement circa 1866–1872.
- Industry: Musical instruments
- Founded: 1850s
- Founder: Jacob Estey
- Defunct: c. 1961
- Headquarters: Brattleboro, Vermont
- Area served: Worldwide
- Products: Pump organs (Melodeon, American reed organ); Pipe organs, Theatre organs, Electronic organs

The Estey Organ Company was an organ manufacturer based in Brattleboro, Vermont, founded in 1852 by Jacob Estey. At its peak, the company was one of the world's largest organ manufacturers, employed about 700 people, and sold its high-quality items as far away as Africa, Great Britain, Australia, and New Zealand. Estey built around 500,000 to 520,000 pump organs between 1846 and 1955.

== History ==
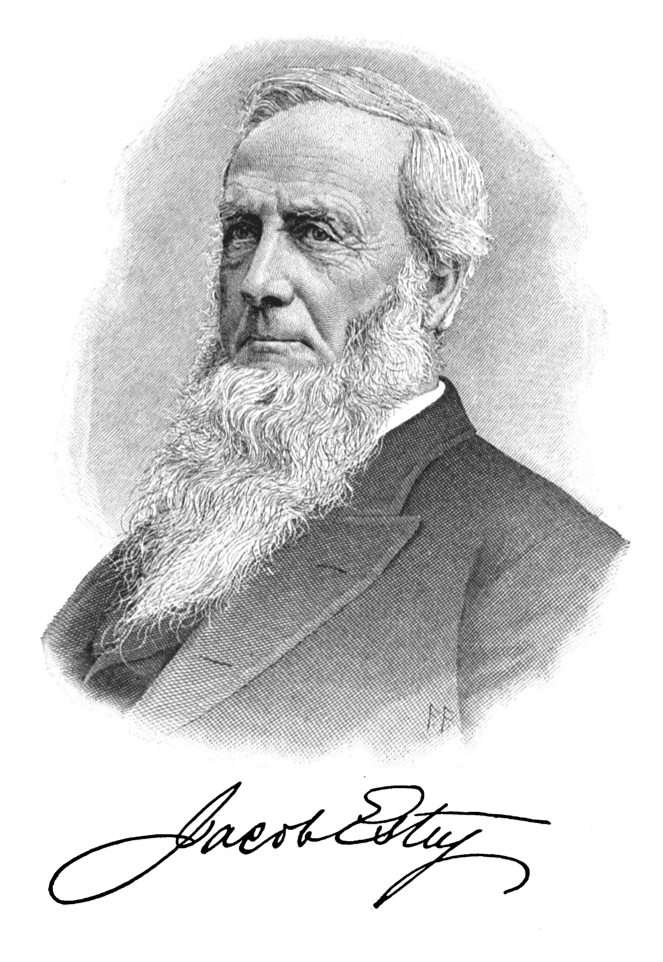
Jacob Estey

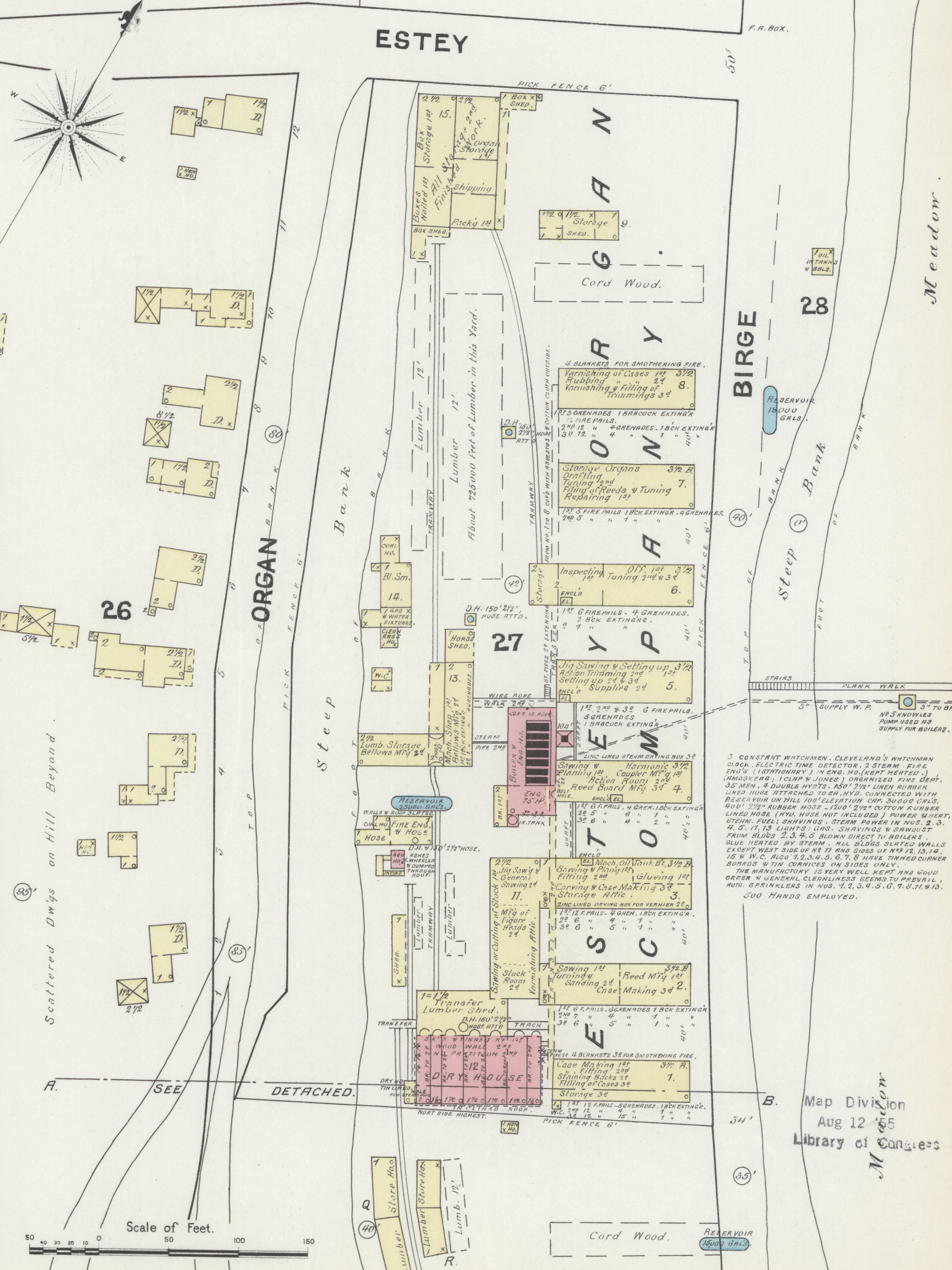
Estey Organ Company (Brattleboro, Vermont) 1891 map from Sanborn Map Company

=== Jacob Estey ===
Jacob Estey (1814–1890) born in Hinsdale, New Hampshire, ran away from an orphanage to Worcester, Massachusetts, where he learned the plumbing trade. In 1835 he arrived in Brattleboro, Vermont at age 21 to work in a plumbing shop. He soon bought the shop, beginning a long career as a successful businessman. He died in 1890.

About 1850, Estey built a two-story shop in Brattleboro and rented it out to a small company that manufactured melodeons. When the renters ran short of cash, Estey took an interest in the business in lieu of rent, eventually becoming sole proprietor. Despite having no musical talent or skills as an inventor, Jacob Estey grew the company into a great success, giving up the plumbing business. In 1855, Estey organized the first manufacturing company to bear his name, Estey & Greene—followed by Estey & Company, J. Estey & Company, Estey Organ Company—and finally, Estey Organ Corporation. In advertising copy the company claimed to have been building organs since 1846.

Jacob Estey saw the manufacturing and sale of these instruments, later known as American reed organs, as a new business opportunity.

=== Estey reed organs in the 19th century ===
Estey started production in 1850 with about 75 instruments per year. After a flood threatened his downtown factory, Estey built a new factory on Birge street. The Birge street factory opened in 1870, producing 250 organs per month. The company grew quickly, building its 100,000th organ in 1880, and its 200,000th organ in 1888.

In 1892 the Estey company employed 500 men and built 1200 to 1500 organs per month. In August 1892, Estey commemorated the making of its 250,000th organ with an elaborate ceremony which included fireworks, an orchestra, and prominent guests including state representative James Loren Martin and Vermont governor John B. Page.

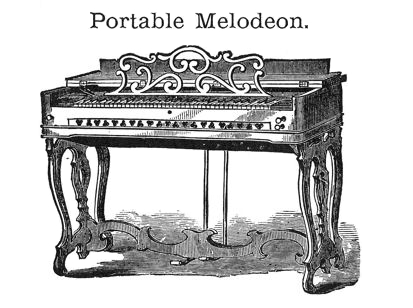
Portable melodeon by Estey & Green (1855-1863)

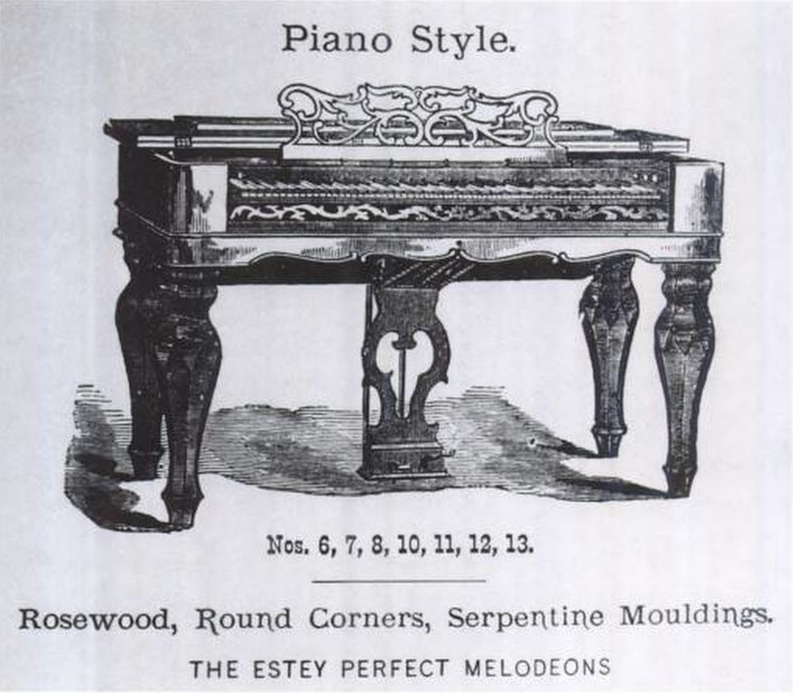
Piano style melodeon (1867)

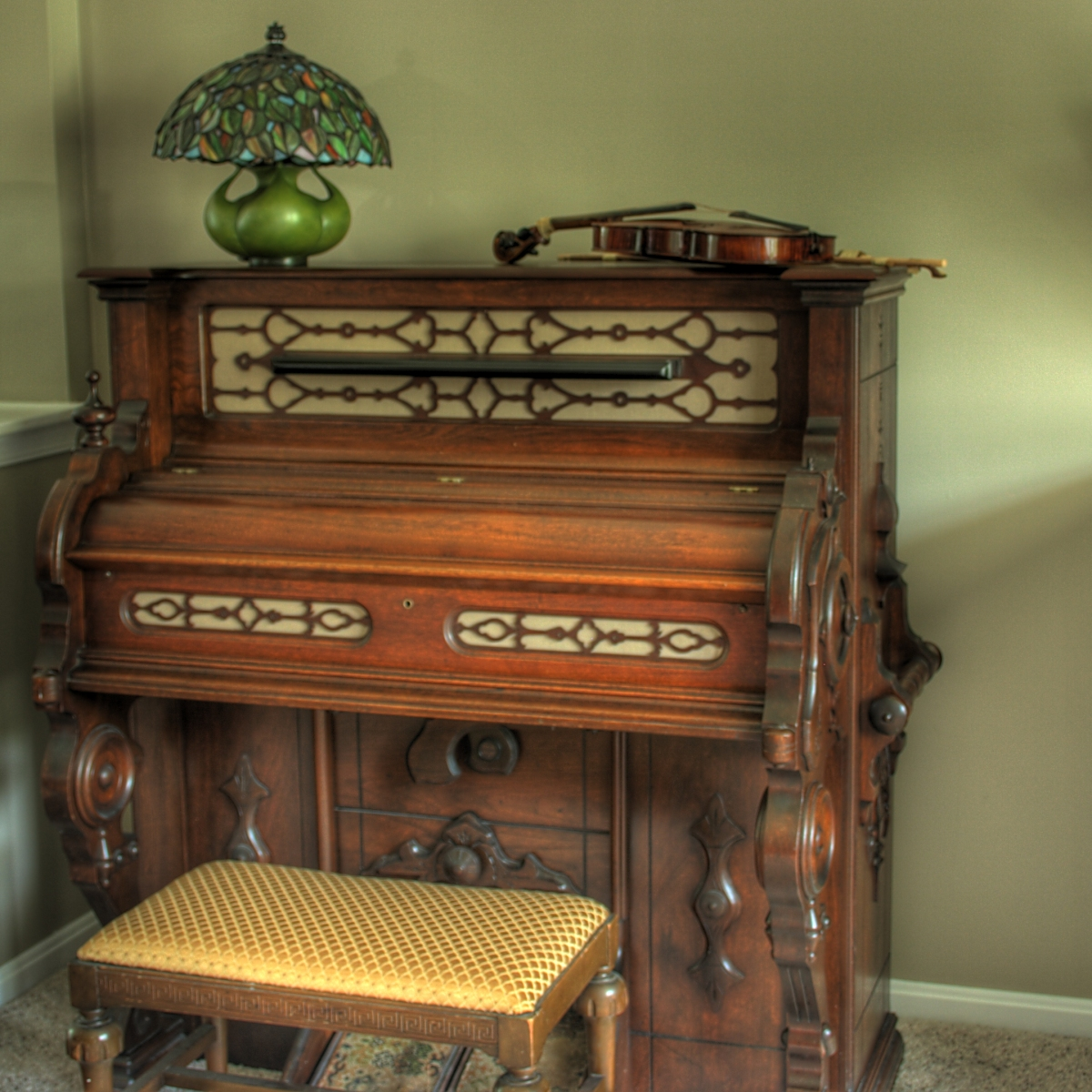
American reed organ (Cottage organ style)

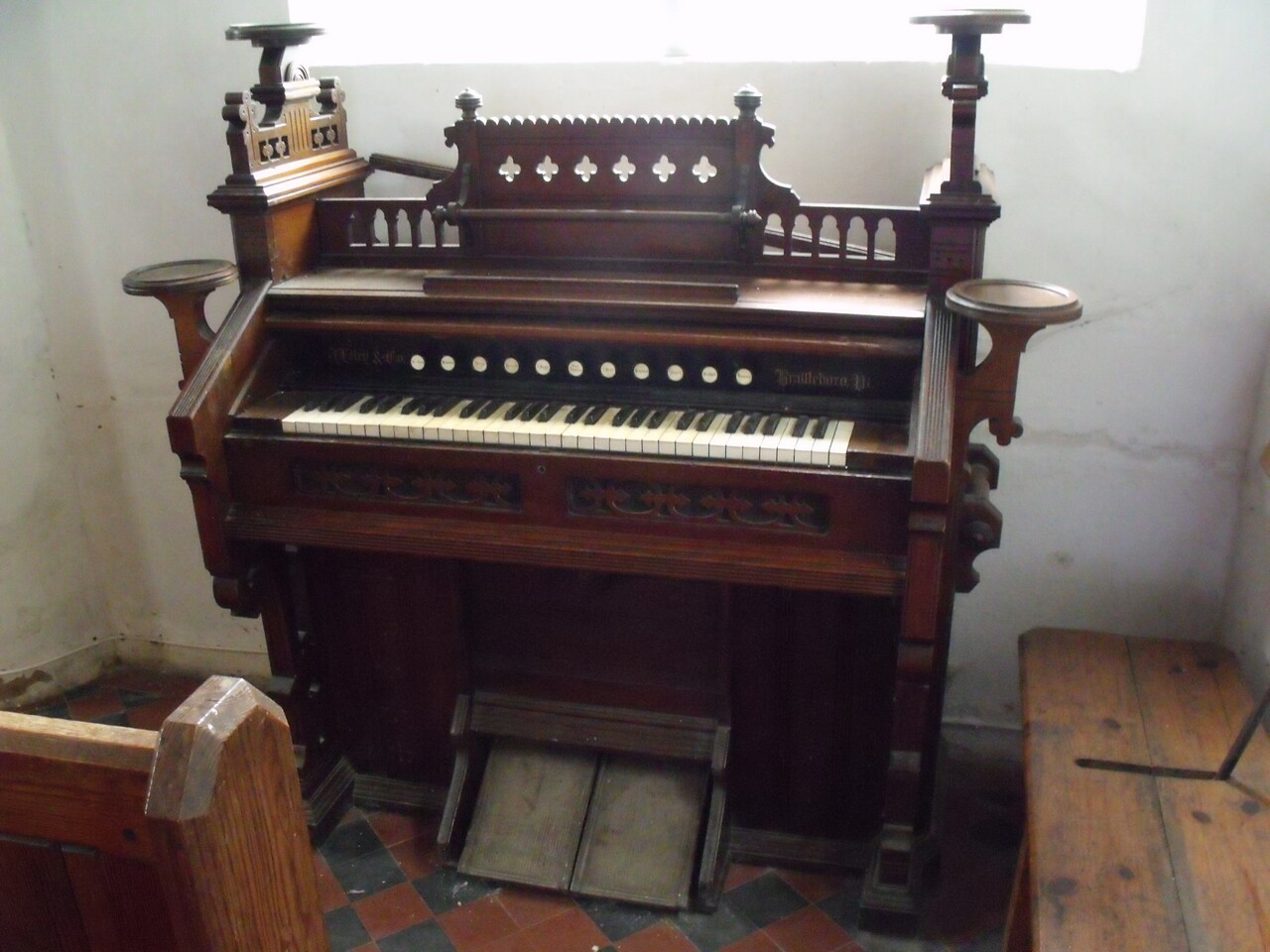
Chapel organ (1864-1882)

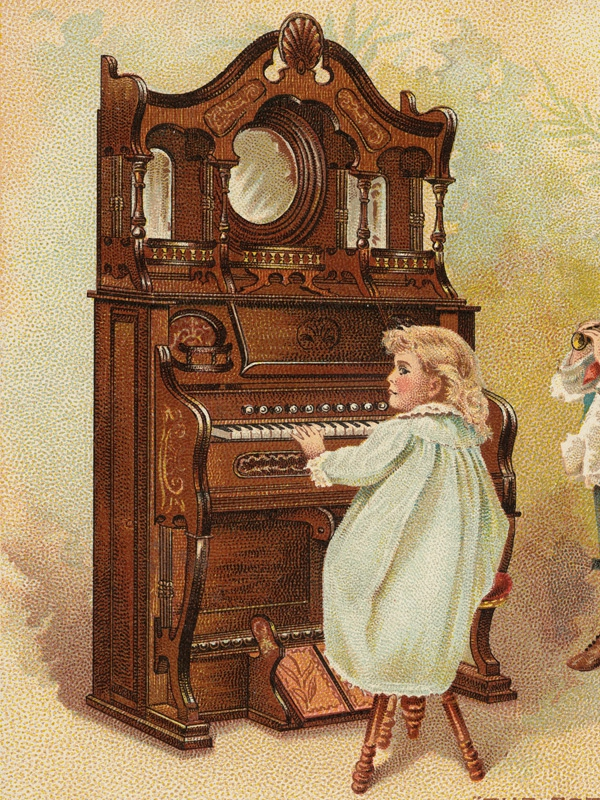
Parlor organ with top (1897)

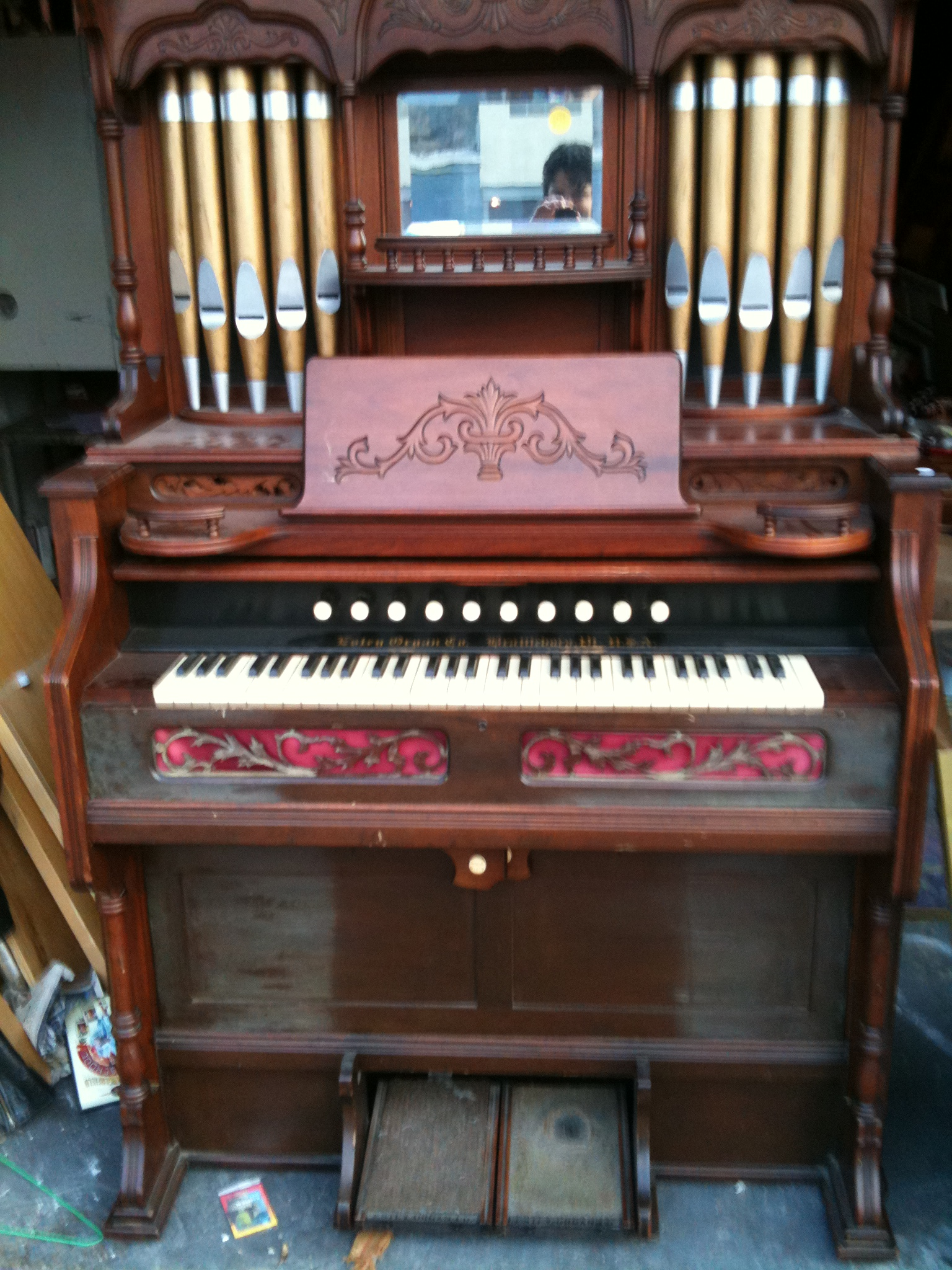
Pipe-top parlor organ

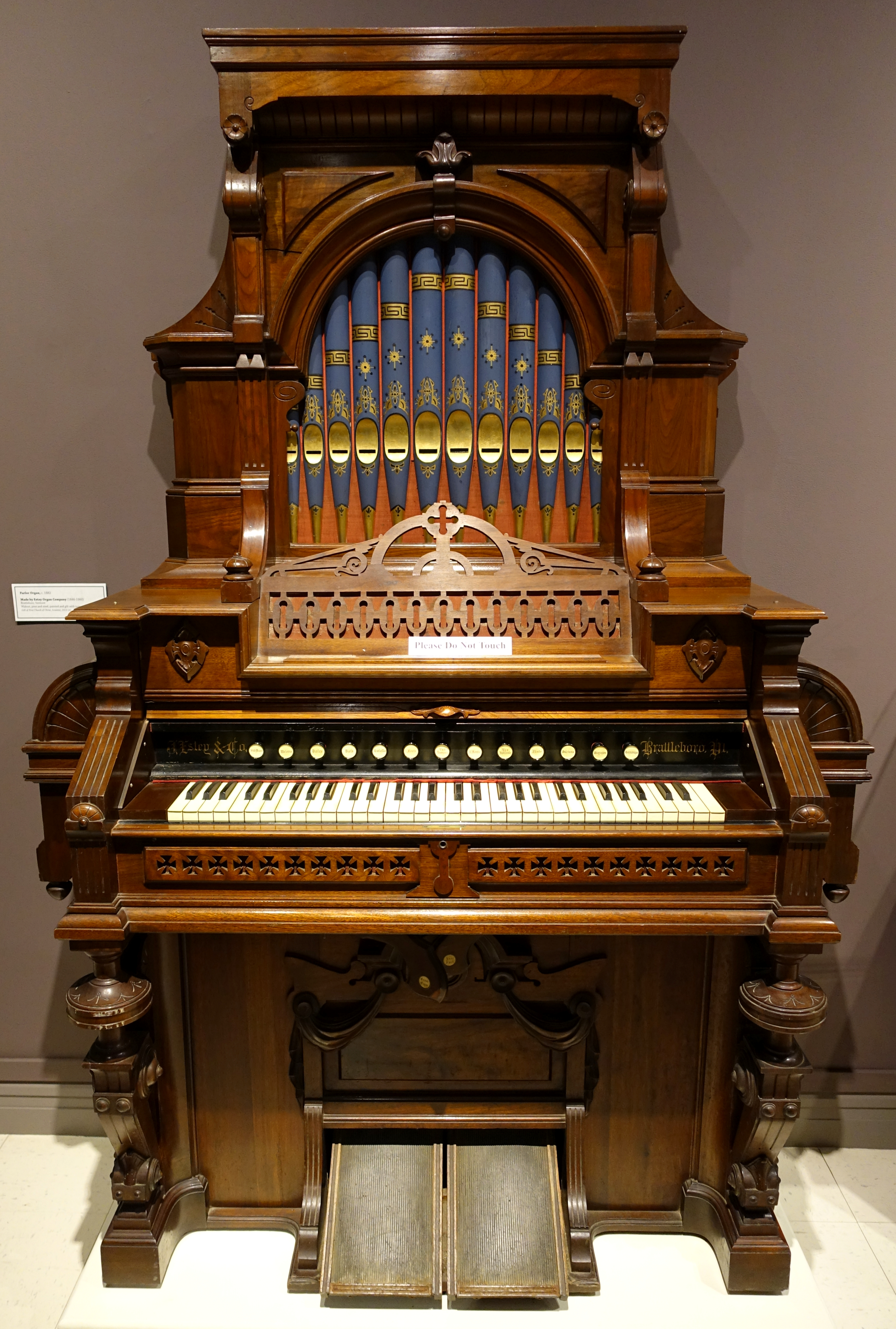
Boudoir organ with pipe-top (1882, a style)

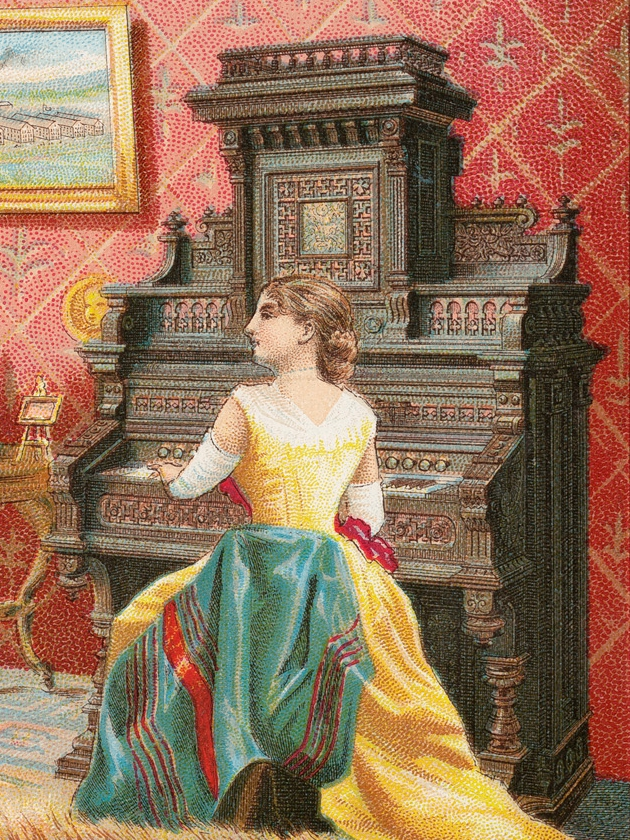
Salon organ (late 19th century, a style)

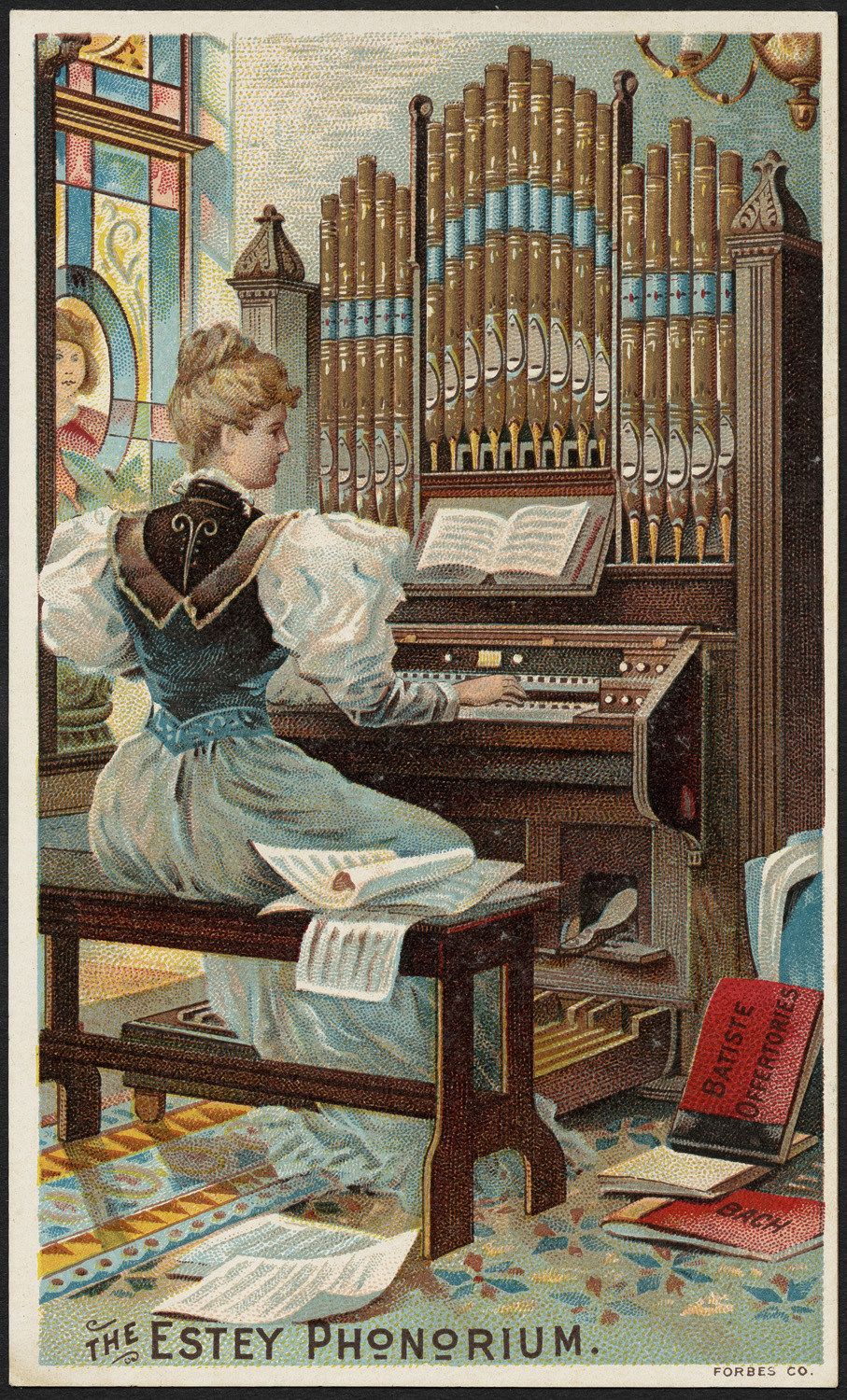
Church Phonorium organ (late 19th century, a style)

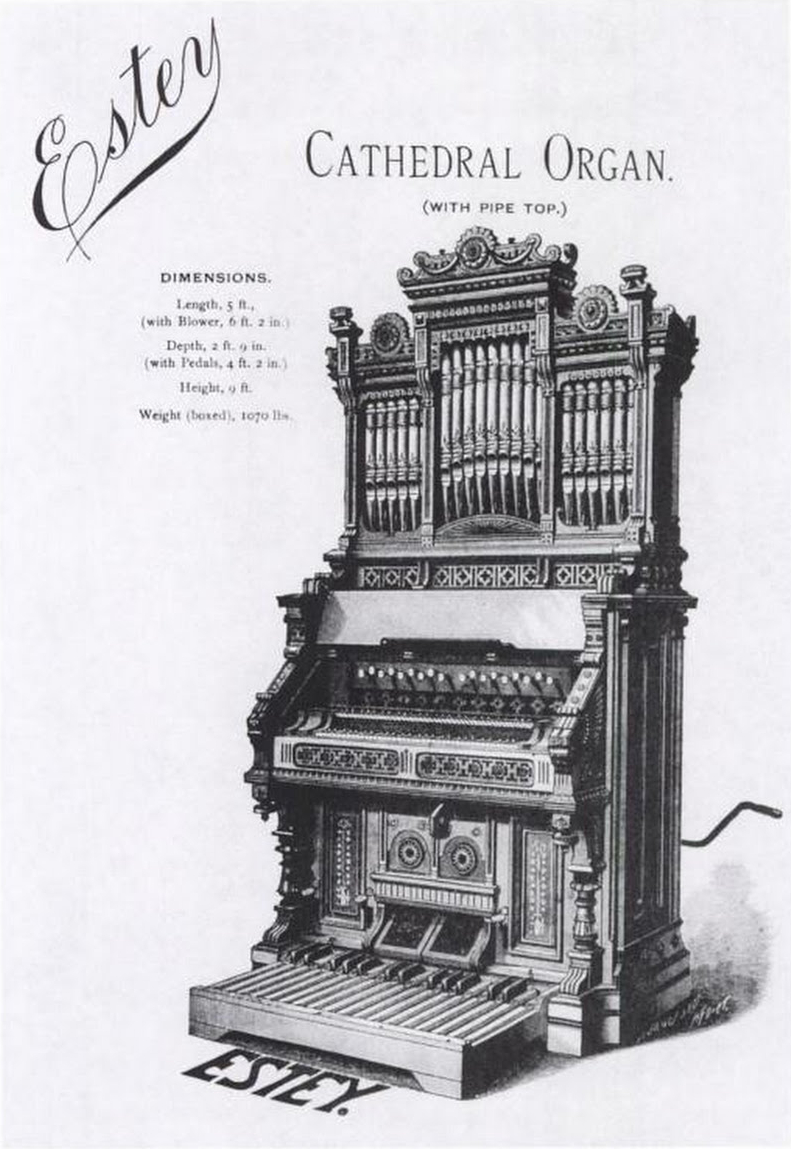
Cathedral organ with pipe-top (1890, a style)

=== Estey in the early 20th century ===
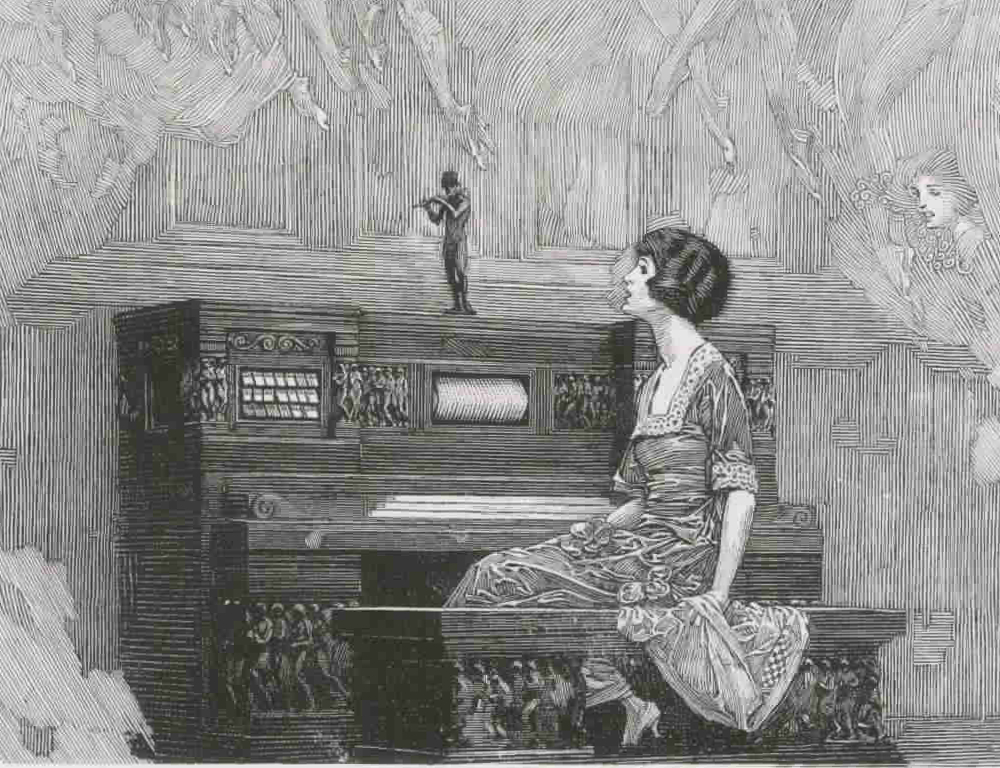
Estey Residence Pipe Organ console (1922)

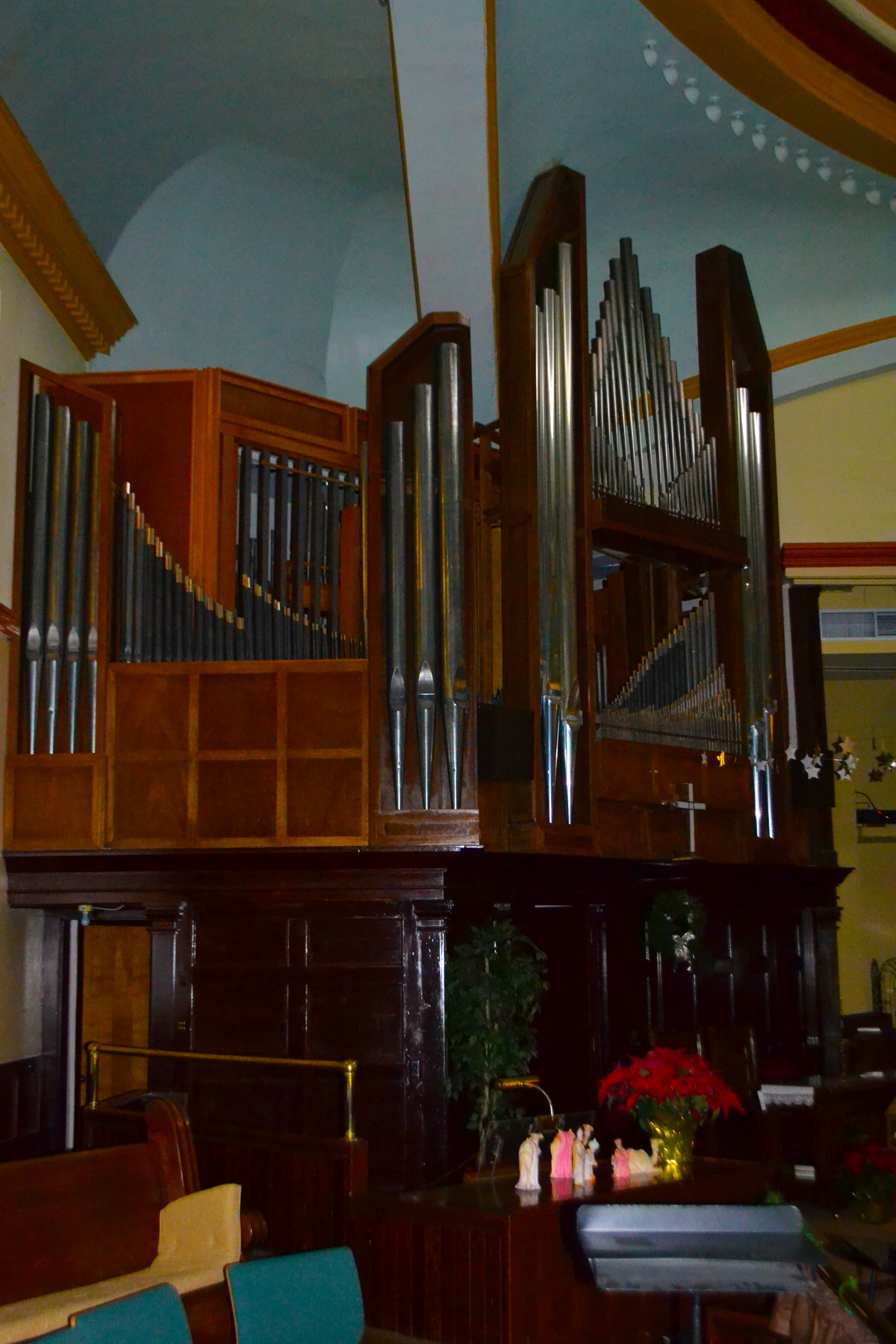
Estey pipe organ
opus 1111 (1913)

Over its more than one hundred years, the Vermont Estey company became one of the largest and best known manufacturer of reed organs in the world. It made more than 520,000 instruments, all labeled Brattleboro, Vt. USA. In 1901, Estey Organ Company began making pipe organs, and became one of the largest American pipe organ manufacturers. They built and sold more than 3,200 pipe organs across the U.S. and abroad. The company provided organs for many important locations, including New York City's Capital Theatre, the Sacramento, CA Municipal Auditorium, and Henry Ford's home in Dearborn, Michigan.

Also during the era of silent films, Estey made over 160 theatre organs.

=== Estey Organ after World War II ===
Following World War II, Estey developed and manufactured electronic organs, joining a limited number of companies that manufactured all three types of organs—reed, pipe, and electronic. In the 1950s, Harald Bode joined Estey. He had been a pioneer in the research and development of electronic musical instrument since the 1930s, and had developed the Bode Organ in 1951. At Estey, he helped develop the Estey Electronic Organ model S and AS-1 (1954), then served as a chief engineer and a vice-president of Estey during the late 1950s.

== Estey Organ Company Factory ==
- Estey Organ Company Factory
- U.S. National Register of Historic Places
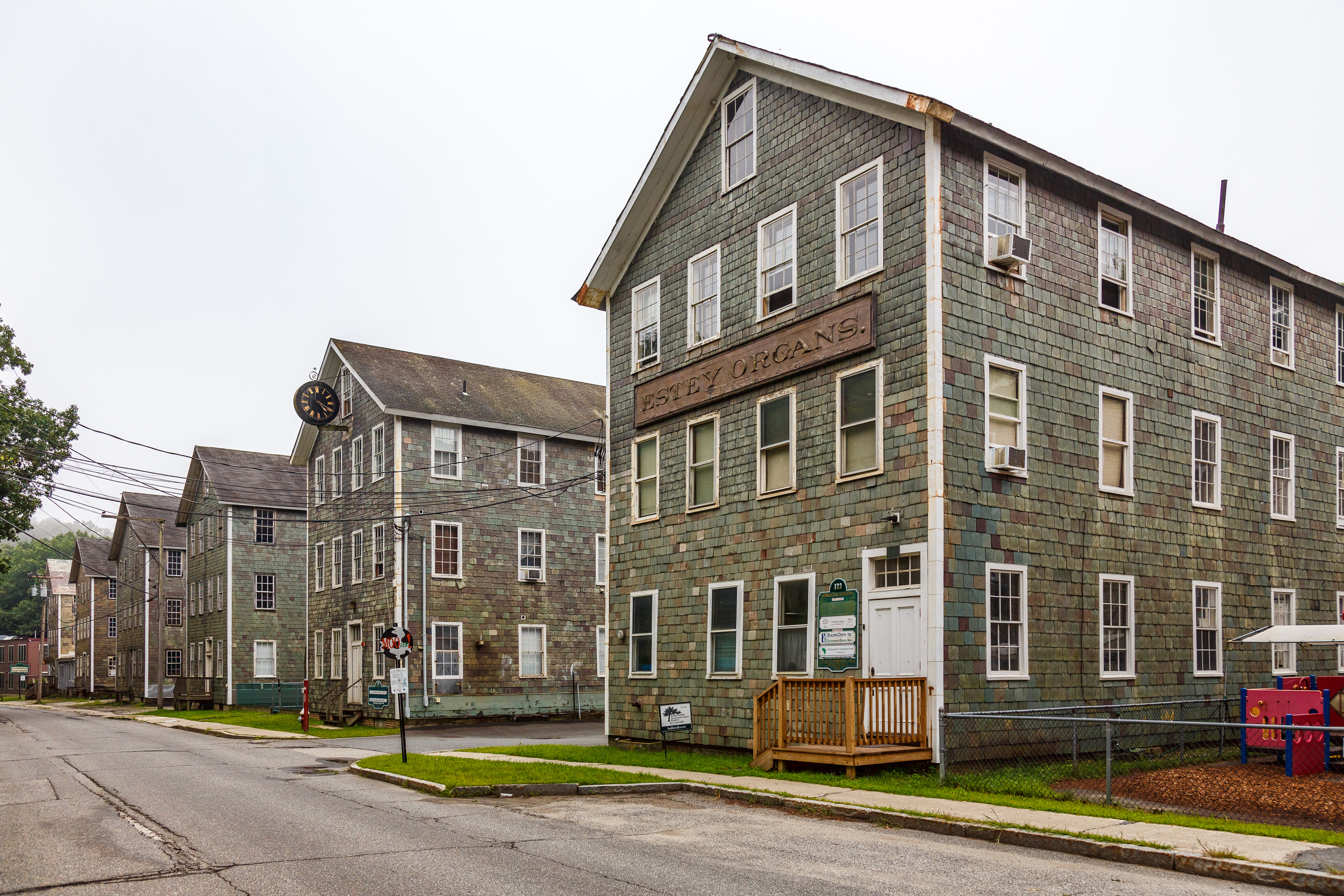
- Old Estey Organ Factory (Brattleboro, Vermont)
- Location: Birge St., Brattleboro, Vermont
- Coordinates: 42°50′51″N 72°34′4″W
- Area: 5 acres (2.0 ha)
- Built: 1870
- NRHP reference No.: 80000344 (original); 06001232 (increase)

Significant dates
- Added to NRHP: April 17, 1980
- Boundary increase: January 9, 2007

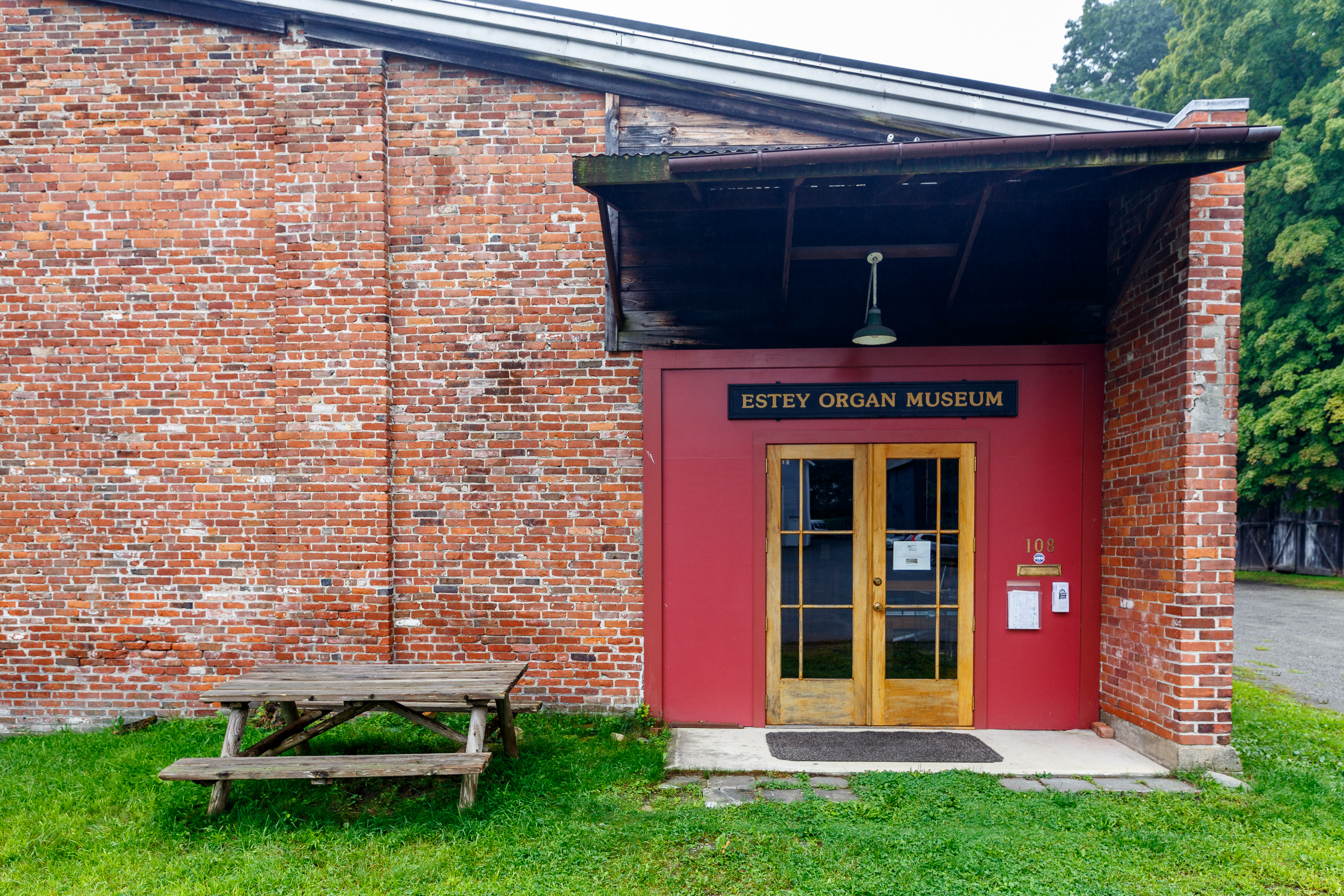
Museum

The Estey Organ Company's main factory was located southwest of downtown Brattleboro, on the south side of Whetstone Brook between Birge and Organ Streets. At its height, the complex had more than 20 buildings, many of which were interconnected by raised walkways and covered bridges. Several of the buildings were built with distinctive slate siding, resulting in an architecturally unique collection of such structures in the state. One of the buildings now houses the Estey Organ Museum; the entire surviving complex was listed on the National Register of Historic Places in 1980, both for its architecture, and as a major economic force in Brattleboro for many years.

== Social contributions by Estey family ==
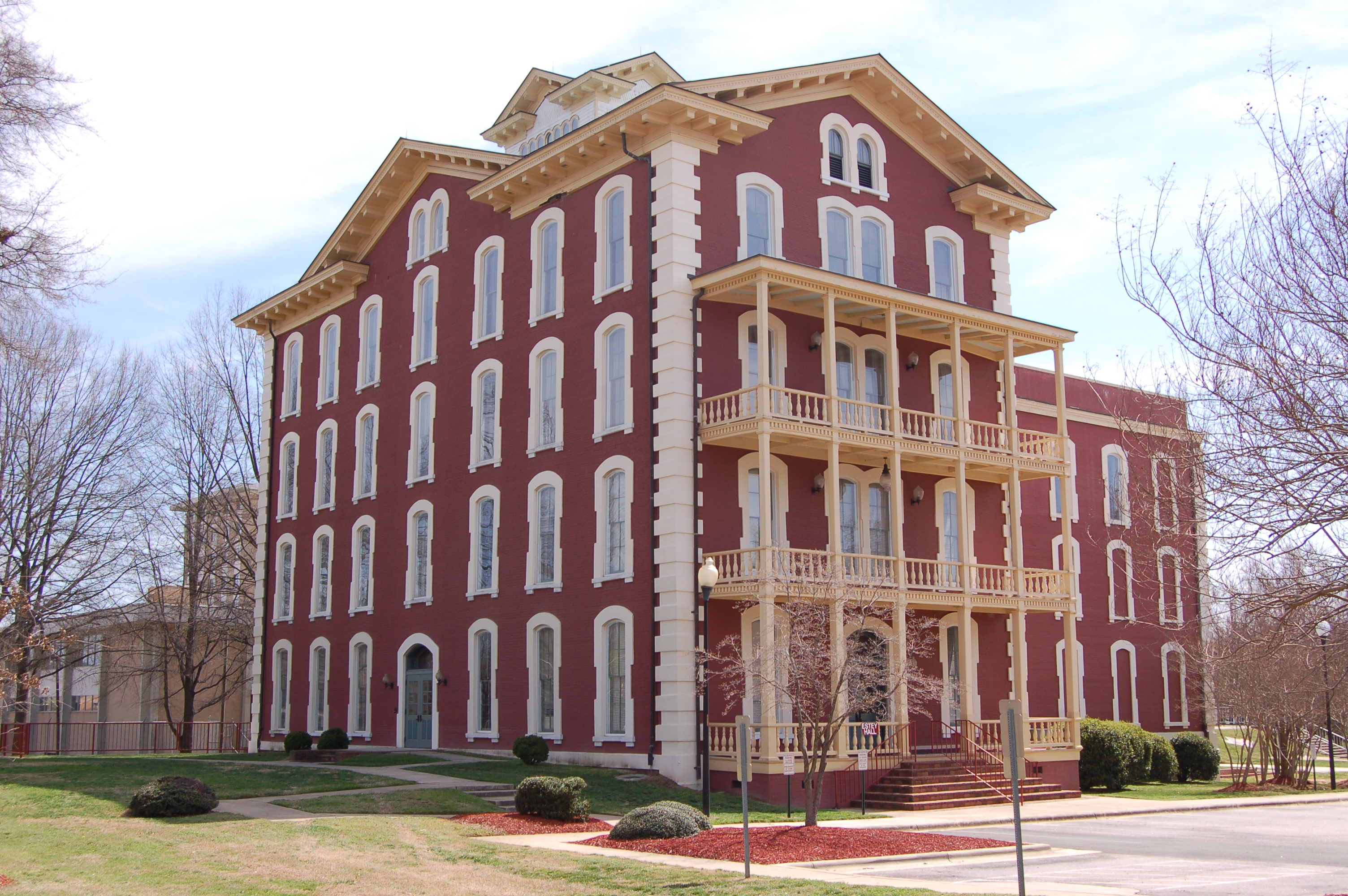
Estey Hall of Shaw University, North Carolina

The Estey family had a long tradition of company leadership and community involvement, including residential development such as Esteyville; banking; town government; schools; fire protection; military units; churches; and Vermont state politics and government. Estey Hall on the campus of Shaw University is named after Estey, who contributed to the construction of the building. It was the first building in the entire U.S. dedicated for the higher education of African-American women.

== See also ==
- Edwin S. Votey
- National Register of Historic Places listings in Windham County, Vermont
- List of New York City Designated Landmarks in the Bronx - Estey Piano Company Factory
