= George S. H. Appleget =

American architect (1831–1880)

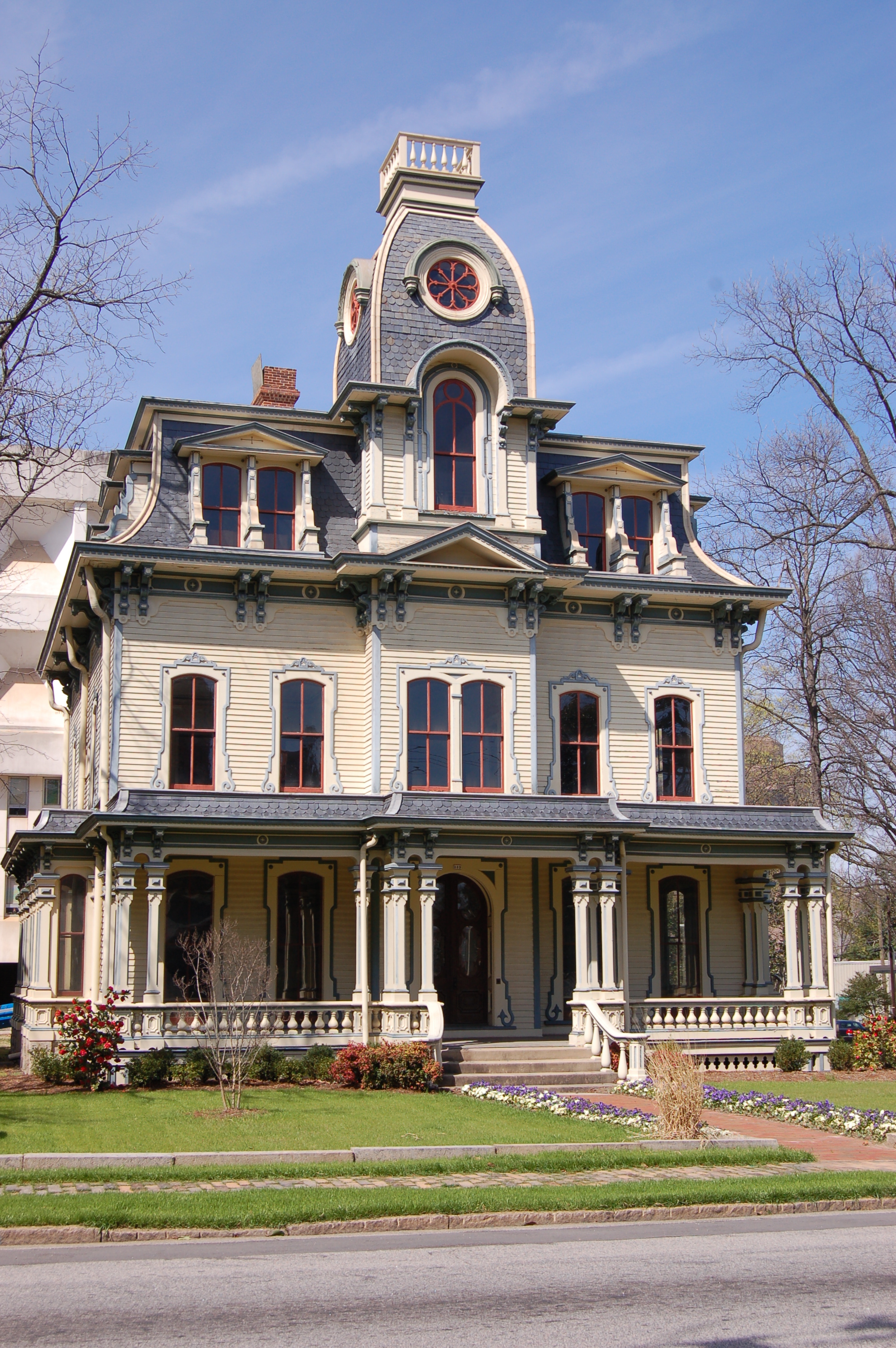
Heck-Andrews House, Raleigh, North Carolina, U.S.

George S. H. Appleget (1831–1880) was an American architect and carpenter. He was active in Philadelphia, New York, and North Carolina.

== Biography ==
He was born in 1831, in New Jersey. He worked as a carpenter. In his early career he worked in Philadelphia, and New York. By 1869, he had moved to Raleigh, North Carolina and worked as an architect. He died on January 12, 1880, at the age of 48.

Several of his works are listed on the U.S. National Register of Historic Places (NRHP).

== List of works ==
- Andrews-Duncan House, Raleigh, North Carolina; NRHP-listed
- Banker's House, Shelby, North Carolina; NRHP-listed
- Cabarrus County Courthouse, Concord, North Carolina; NRHP-listed
- Estey Hall, on the campus of Shaw University, Raleigh, North Carolina; NRHP-listed
- Heck-Andrews House, Raleigh, North Carolina; NRHP-listed
