= Estey Hall =

- U.S. National Register of Historic Places
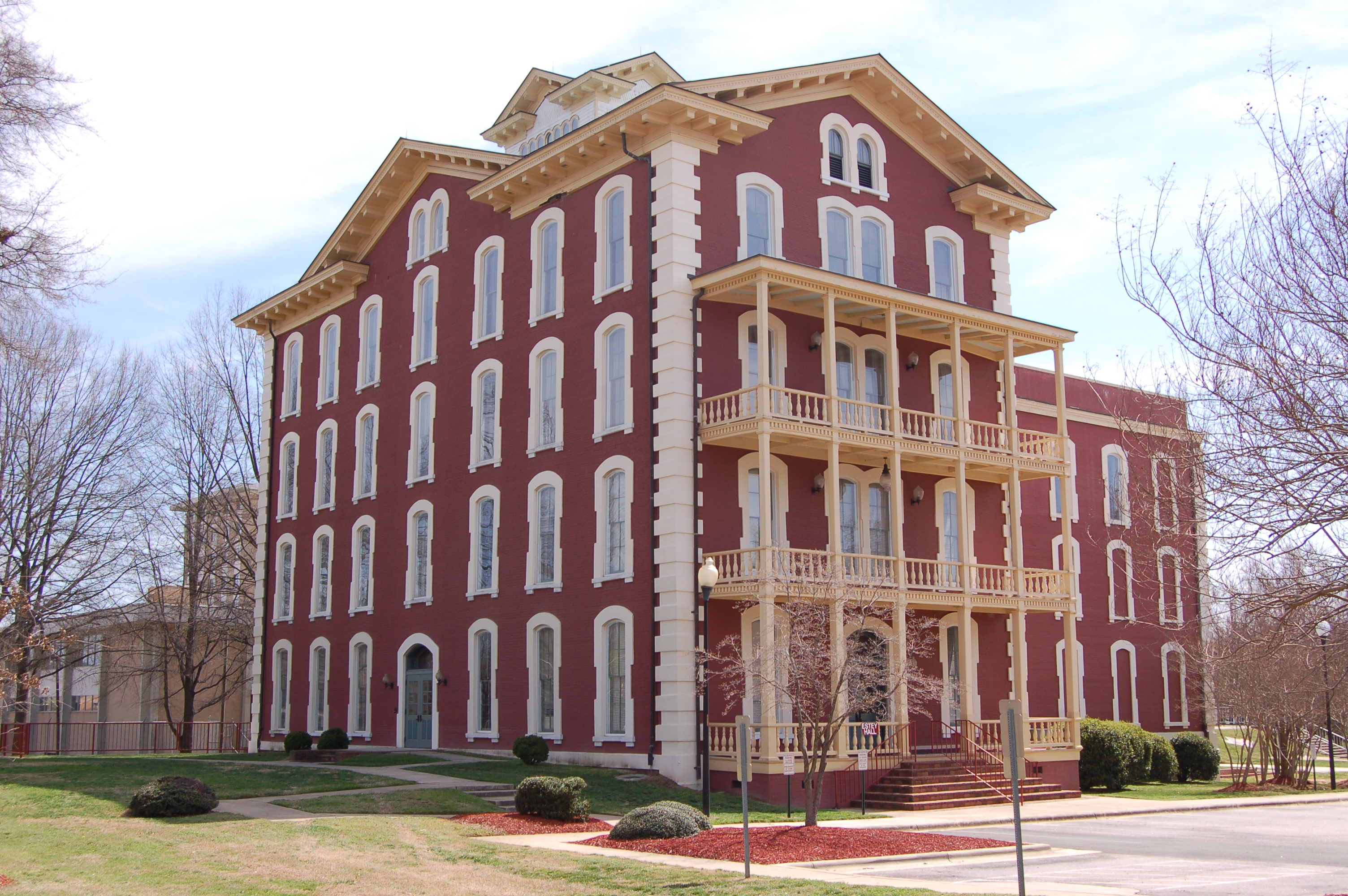
- Estey Hall

- Location within North Carolina Location within the United States
- Location: Raleigh, North Carolina
- Coordinates: 35°46′16.9″N 78°38′14.03″W
- Built: 1873
- Architect: G. S. H. Appleget
- Architectural style: Italianate
- NRHP reference No.: 73001373
- Added to NRHP: May 25, 1973

Estey Hall is a historic building on the campus of Shaw University in Raleigh, North Carolina. It was the first building constructed for the higher education of African-American women in the United States. Built in 1873, Estey Hall is the oldest surviving building at Shaw, which is the oldest historically black college in the South and was the second institution of higher learning established for freedmen after the Civil War. The building, originally known as "Estey Seminary," was named in honor of Jacob Estey, the largest donor to the construction project. Estey Hall, located in the East Raleigh-South Park Historic District, was listed on the National Register of Historic Places in 1973 and is a Raleigh Historic Landmark.

== History ==
Henry Martin Tupper, a Union Army chaplain and Baptist missionary, founded the school in 1865 for the education of former slaves. Students and faculty originally met in a hotel room due to the lack of funding for land and buildings. In 1870, the school received a donation from philanthropist Elijah J. Shaw, and with the money the school was able to purchase land near Fayetteville Street. The school was chartered in 1875 by the North Carolina General Assembly and given the official title of Shaw University. By educating young people, the school assisted in the rise of the black middle class that arose in late 19th century Raleigh. Shaw University educated many of the region's black politicians and business leaders, such as M.T. Pope.

When Shaw first opened, women were not allowed to attend the school. After a few years the school became coeducational, creating a need for a women's facility. School administrators chose George S. H. Appleget, architect of large homes in Raleigh including the Heck-Andrews House, to design the new building. The result was a four-story brick building with a cross-gable roof topped off with a frame cupola. In 1882, the three-story south annex was added. Estey Hall contained the home economics, music, art, and religion classes.

Shaw students attended classes at Estey Hall until 1970. Deterioration had taken a toll on the building, forcing its closure after 97 years of service. Plans were made to tear down the building. The Estey Hall Foundation was then founded to halt demolition and restore the building to its original appearance.

== See also ==
- List of Registered Historic Places in North Carolina
