= South Union Street Courthouse and Commercial Historic District =

Historic district in North Carolina, United States

- U.S. National Register of Historic Places
- U.S. Historic district
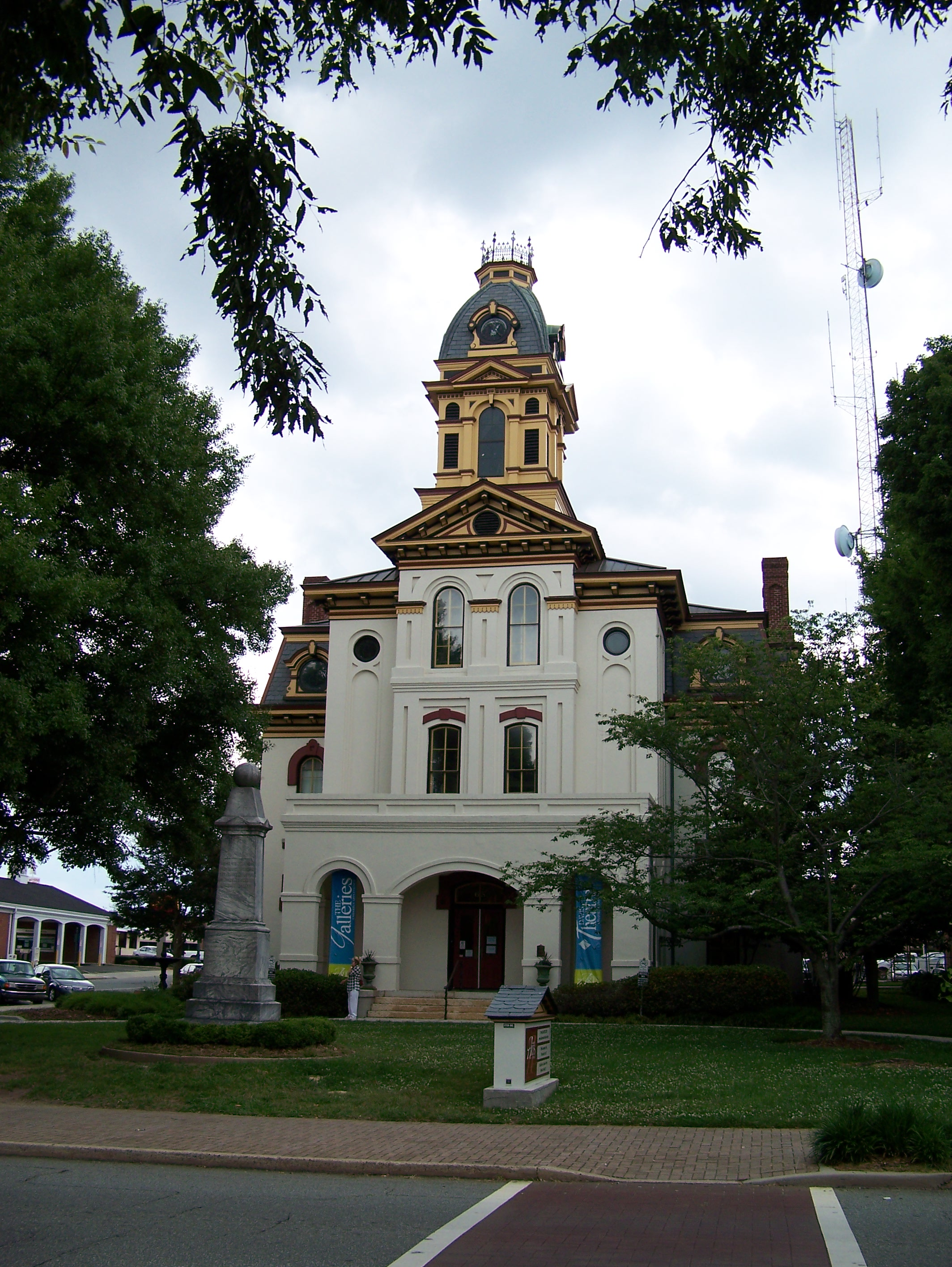
- Old Cabarrus County County Courthouse, 2012

- Location within North Carolina Location within the United States
- Location: Along Union St., bounded by Corban and Cabarrus Aves., Concord, North Carolina
- Coordinates: 35°24′34″N 80°34′49″W
- Area: 3.2 acres (1.3 ha)
- Built: 1875
- Architect: Applegat, George S.H.; Ahrens, F.W.
- Architectural style: Italianate, Second Empire, Romanesque
- NRHP reference No.: 97001196
- Added to NRHP: September 30, 1997

South Union Street Courthouse and Commercial Historic District is a national historic district located at Concord, Cabarrus County, North Carolina. The district encompasses 11 contributing buildings in the central business district of Concord. It primarily includes commercial buildings in popular architectural styles including Italianate, Romanesque Revival, and Second Empire style architecture. Located in the district are the Elks Hall (c. 1905), former Town Hall (c. 1885), G. W. Patterson Wholesale Grocery (c. 1890), Pythian Building (c. 1903), Watch Repair Shop (early 1930s), and former Cabarrus Savings Bank (1923-1924). Also in the district is the separately listed former Cabarrus County Courthouse.

It was listed on the National Register of Historic Places in 1997.
