= East Raleigh–South Park Historic District =

Historic district in North Carolina, United States

- U.S. National Register of Historic Places
- U.S. Historic district
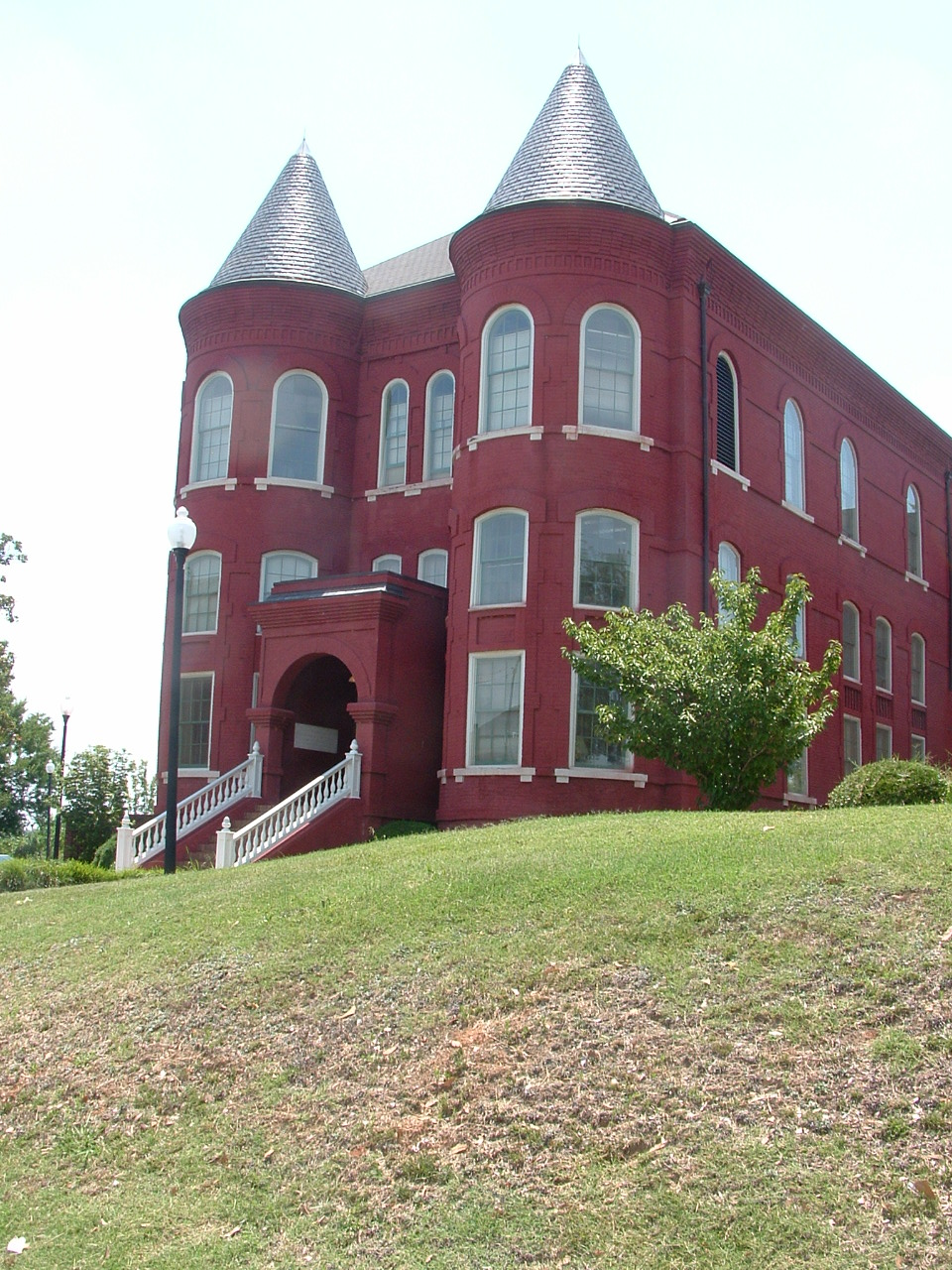
- Leonard Hall at Shaw University

- Location within North Carolina Location within the United States
- Location: Roughly bounded by Bragg, East, E. Lenoir, Alston, Camden, Hargett, Swain, Davis, and S. Blount Sts., Raleigh, North Carolina
- Coordinates: 35°46′20″N 78°38′00″W
- Area: 148 acres (60 ha)
- Built: 1866
- Architect: Edward, Gaston A.; Et al.
- Architectural style: Colonial Revival, Italianate
- NRHP reference No.: 90001527
- Added to NRHP: October 11, 1990

The East Raleigh–South Park Historic District is the largest historically African-American neighborhood in Raleigh, North Carolina. The district, located south and east of downtown Raleigh, covers approximately 30 blocks and contains portions of the Smith–Haywood and St. Petersburg neighborhoods. Most homes in these neighborhoods were built between 1900 and 1940, with one-fifth dating back to the 19th century. Historic buildings in the district include Estey Hall and Leonard Hall, both located on the campus of Shaw University. The district was listed on the National Register of Historic Places in October 1990.

During the 1980s and 1990s portions of the district were redeveloped by the City of Raleigh housing authority in a slum clearance exercise in an effort to redevelop the neighborhood and improve infrastructure.

== See also ==
- List of Registered Historic Places in North Carolina
