= Marguerite Frierson =

American educator

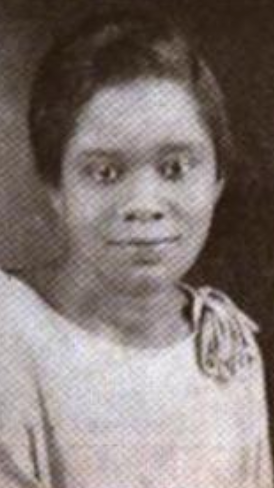
- Marguerite Frierson, from a 1928 publication
- Born: May 1, 1907; Augusta, Georgia
- Died: September 29, 1998 (age 91); Richmond, Georgia
- Occupation(s): Educator, college professor, state official

Marguerite Shepard Frierson (May 1, 1907 – September 29, 1998) was an American educator. She was a professor of education at Shaw University and Barber–Scotia College, and from 1949 to 1971 at Fayetteville State Teachers College. She was supervisor of elementary education in the North Carolina Department of Public Instruction in the 1950s.

== Early life and education ==
Frierson was from Augusta, Georgia, the daughter of Taylor Jererdeau (T. J.) Frierson and Margaret (Maggie) R. Hamlin Frierson. Her father was a physician. She graduated from Shaw University in 1928, and earned a bachelor's degree at the University of Cincinnati. She earned a master's degree (M.Ed.) from Boston University in 1938. In 1950 she completed doctoral studies at Ohio State University. She was a member of Pi Lambda Theta.

== Career ==
Frierson taught at Shaw University in the 1930s. In the 1940s, she taught at Barber–Scotia College, and directed a 1945 summer program for Black teachers in Alamance County. She was a professor of education and department chair at Fayetteville State University from 1949 to 1971. From 1950 to 1952, she was also supervisor of elementary education in the North Carolina Department of Public Instruction. In 1968, she was appointed to North Carolina's Advisory Council on Vocational Education.

She was one of the incorporators of the National Alumni Association of Shaw University, in 1952.

== Personal life ==
Frierson died in 1998, at the age of 91, in Georgia.
