= Shaw University =

Historically Black private college in Raleigh, North Carolina, US

Coordinates: 35.77117°N 78.63610°W

- Former names: Raleigh Theological Institute (1869–1870); Shaw Collegiate Institute (1870–1875)
- Motto: Pro Christo Et Humanitate
- Motto in English: For Christ and Humanity
- Type: Private historically Black university
- Established: 1 December 1865; 160 years ago
- Founder: Henry Martin Tupper
- Religious affiliation: American Baptist Churches, USA
- Academic affiliations: UNCF
- Endowment: $10.9 million (2019)
- Chairman: Joseph N. Bell
- President: Paulette Dillard
- Academic staff: 59 full time
- Students: 962
- Location: Raleigh, North Carolina, United States
- Campus: Urban ( 65 Acres)
- Colors: Garnet and White
- Nickname: Bears
- Sporting affiliations: NCAA Division II – CIAA
- Mascot: The Bear
- Website: shawu.edu
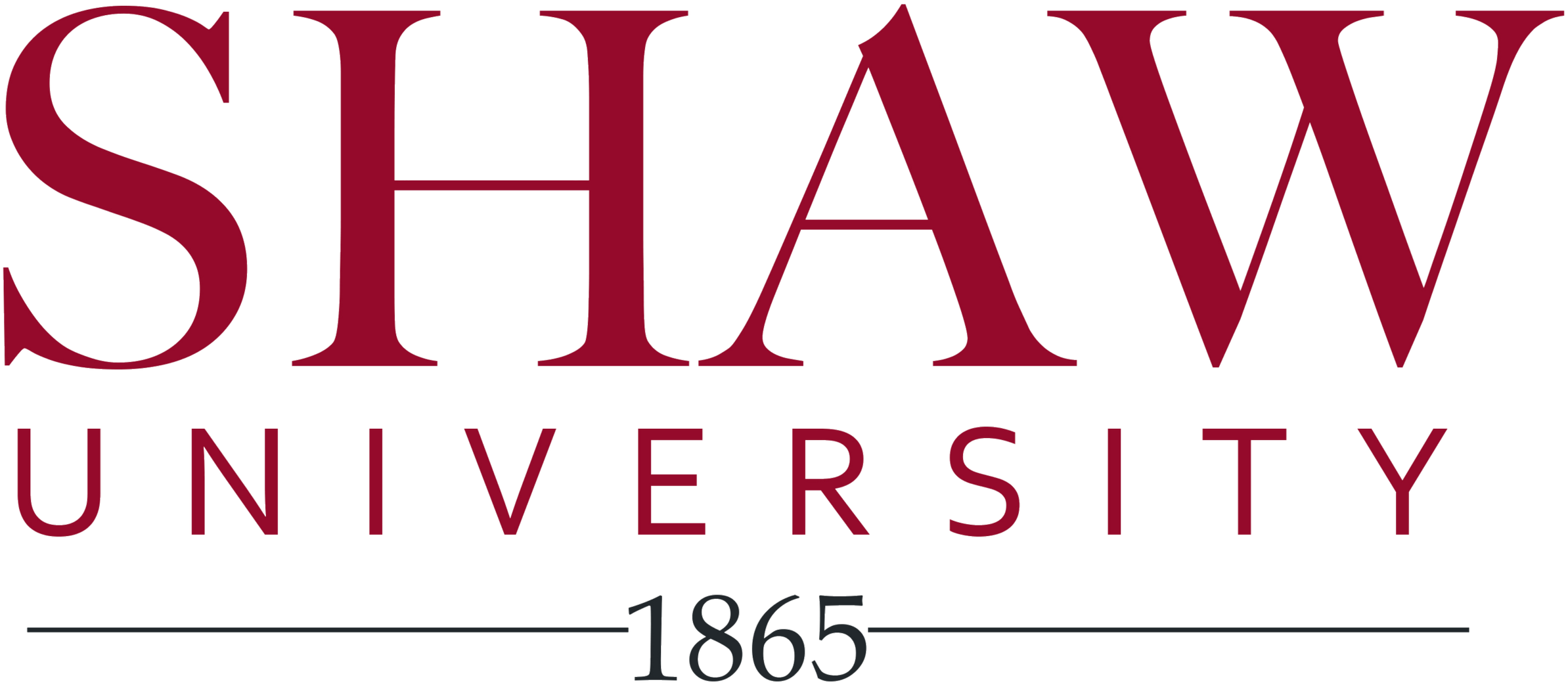

Shaw University is a private historically Black university in Raleigh, North Carolina. Founded on December 1, 1865, Shaw University is the oldest HBCU to begin offering courses in the Southern United States. The school had its origin in the formation of a theological class of freedmen in the Guion Hotel. The following year it moved to a large wooden building, at the corner of Blount and Cabarrus Streets in Raleigh, where it continued as the Raleigh Institute until 1870. In 1870, the school moved to its current location on the former property of Confederate General Barringer and changed its name to the Shaw Collegiate Institute, in honor of Elijah Shaw. In 1875, the school was officially chartered with the State of North Carolina as Shaw University.

The main campus resides on 24 acres in the East Raleigh-South Park Historic District in downtown Raleigh. Shaw also owns and operates a 35-acre farm located on Rock Quarry Rd. Historical buildings, which either currently (Estey Hall) or previously (Shaw Hall) reside on campus, were designed by the famed Raleigh architect George S. H. Appleget and feature a Second Empire and Italianate architectural styles. Other architectural styles present on campus are Leonard Hall, a twin-turret Romanesque Revival style building, and several buildings featuring Brutalist style architectures.

Along with Howard University, Hampton University, Lincoln University and Virginia Union University, Shaw was a co-founding member of the NCAA Division II's Central Intercollegiate Athletic Association (CIAA) Conference, the oldest African American athletic association in the U.S. The university has won CIAA championships in football, basketball (women's and men's), tennis (women's and men's) and volleyball.

== History ==
=== Foundation to the 1920s ===
The school was founded by the American Baptist Home Mission Society and the pastor Henry Martin Tupper in 1865

Henry Martin Tupper, founder and first president of Shaw University

In 1867 the school consisted of two buildings, a large two-story structure and one Antebellum cabins. In 1870, it was renamed Shaw Collegiate Institute after Elijah Shaw who donated a sum of $5,000 ($110,897 in 2021) to partially fund the $13,000 ($288,331 in 2021) necessary to purchase 12 acres of land formally held by General Barringer (where Tupper and his wife once hid in the cornfields from a KKK lynch mob) and erect Shaw Hall, the first building on campus. Shaw Hall was built with a 165-foot frontage, four stories high and possessing a tower, was the most commodious school building in all of North Carolina at that time. It provided instruction services, a library, and lodging.

In 1873, Estey Hall was built in honor of Deacon Jacob Estey and sons of Brattleboro, Vermont, who gave $8,000 ($187,365 in 2021) toward its construction. Estey Hall was the first building constructed in the U.S. for the higher education of African-American women. Estey Hall was devoted to training women in cooking, sewing, music, and the like. Henry Martin Tupper bought the material from which the women made garments and he himself sold the garments in an effort to pay for the cost of the material and other expenses.

In 1879, a third major building was erected – a chapel and dining hall called the Greenleaf Building. It was named for Orick H. Greenleaf of Springfield, MA, a yearly liberal contributor. The upper part of the building was accessible by stairs. Doors on either side of the tower provided entrance to the dining room. At the right of the chapel was a small room and at the left a library. A storeroom existed under the stairway. Funds saved from tuition and board were used to build this structure at a total cost of $6,000. These were augmented by contributions from O.H. Greenleaf, Captain Ebenezer Morgan of Groton, CT, and Deacon O.B. Grant of Stonington, CT.

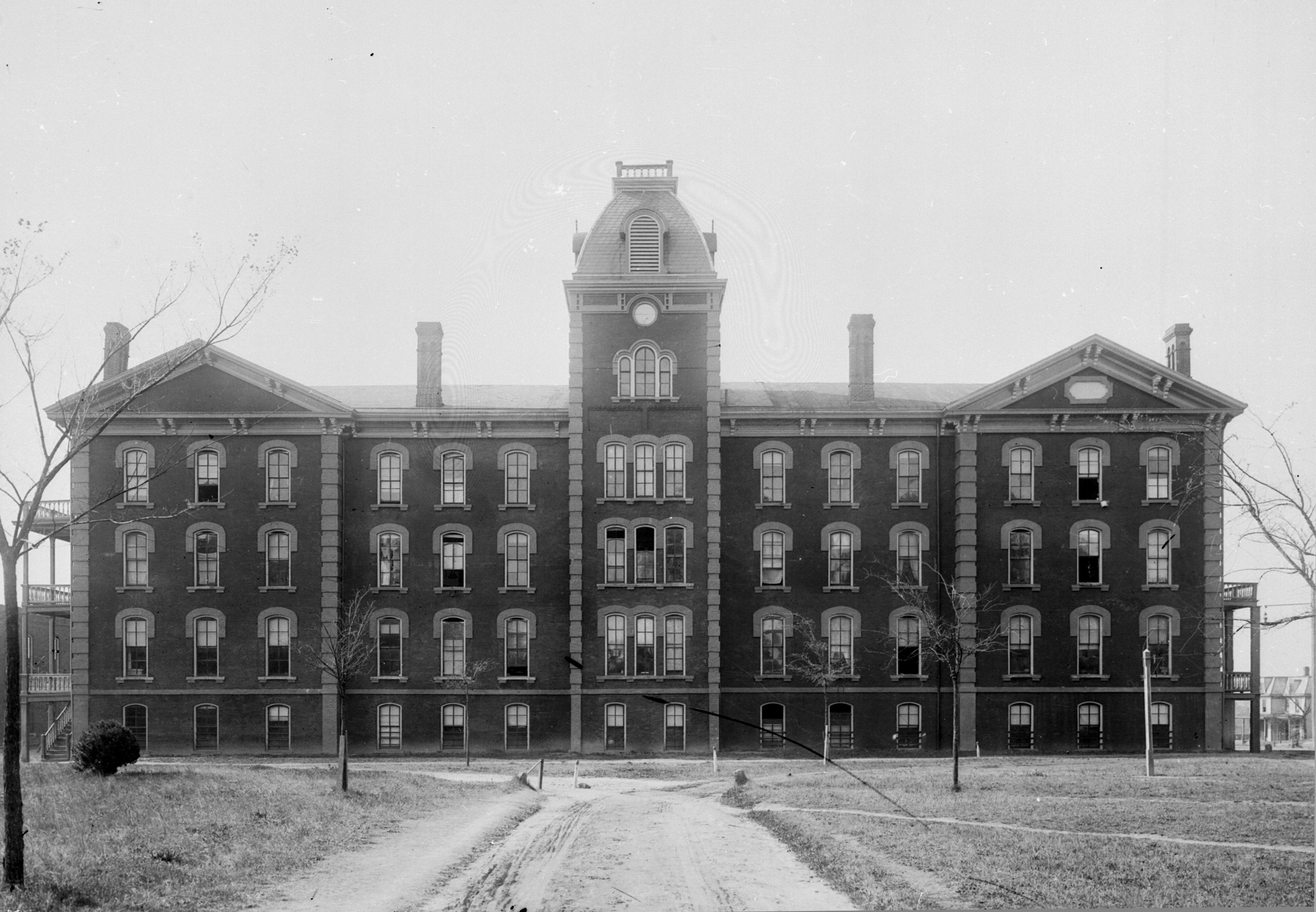
Shaw Hall

In 1866 when the Raleigh Institute was first being developed, Tupper had hoped to open a medical school; in 1882, $5,000 was donated from the Leonard family to establish the Leonard Medical School and the Leonard School of Pharmacy with significant contributions made by Dr. Nathan Bishop, William A. Caldwell, Joseph B. Hoyt, O. H. Greenleaf, Timothy Merrick, and Colonel Levi K. Fuller. The medical school complex, which housed both departments, consisted primarily of three structures – a four-story, 34 bed medical dormitory built to accommodate 60 men and erected in 1881 when the trustees approved the establishment of a medical department; the Leonard Medical Building, erected in the summer and fall of 1881 and containing lecture rooms, dissecting rooms, an amphitheater, and opened for its first session on November 1, 1881; the Leonard Medical School Hospital, a 25-bed hospital which opened for the reception of patients on January 10, 1885. It was the first four-year medical school to train African-American doctors in the South. and the first medical school in the state to offer a four-year curriculum. The school closed in 1918 after being given a scathing evaluation by the Flexner Report that the Negro school "was in no position to make any contribution of value" but recommended Howard and Meharry medical schools remain open.

Leonard Medical School (left) and adjoining hospital (right), c.1910

On December 11, 1888 the university opened the Shaw University Law School, the first of its kind for African-Americans in the country. The Law School curriculum focused on "the subjects of International and Constitutional Law, the various branches of the Common Law, Equity, and Admiralty". It was also the only Black law school that had a course in legal shorthand. The course was offered on the premise that such a skill would broaden the opportunities for a Black lawyer to work in a legal firm in a clerical position or as an office assistant should discrimination impede their ability to practice law. Shaw University graduated fifty-seven law students before it closed in 1916. It graduated fifty-four law students between 1891 and 1914. North Carolina politician John S. Leary was an important figure in the founding of the law school and served as its dean starting in March 1890. He was followed as dean by Edward A. Johnson, who was the law school's first graduate and later the first African-American member of the New York State Assembly. By 1900, Shaw University had trained more than 30,000 Black teachers.

=== 1920s to 1980s ===
In 1968, Shaw University became the first Black college to own a radio station. At first, the station used an antenna on top of a building on the downtown campus, but in the late 1990s a new tower was built in southeast Raleigh near Interstate 40. WFSS in Fayetteville, North Carolina, moved from 89.1 FM to 91.9 FM to allow WSHA to increase power. The university sold the station to Educational Media Foundation effective July 26, 2018, who subsequently renamed it WRKV.

==== U.S. Civil Rights Movement ====
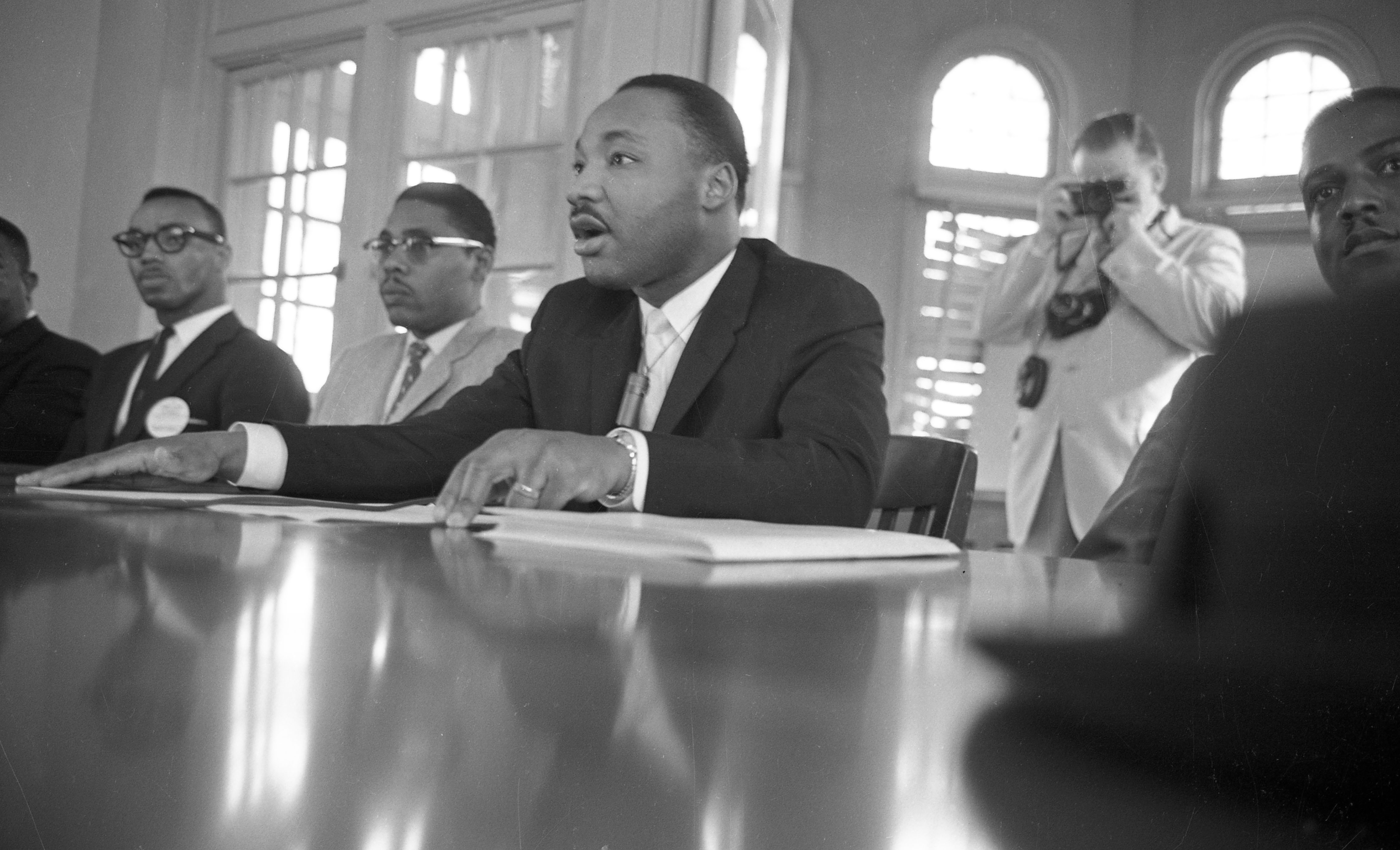
Martin Luther King Jr. attended a Students Nonviolent Coordinating Committee meeting at Shaw in April 1960

The Student Nonviolent Coordinating Committee (SNCC) was one of the organizations of the American Civil Rights Movement in the 1960s. It emerged from a student meeting organized by Ella Baker that was held at Shaw University in April 1960. SNCC grew into a large organization, gaining many supporters in the North as well as in the South. It led grassroots organizing for voter education and registration in Mississippi, among other initiatives. They are best known for their support of sit-ins, including in Greensboro, North Carolina, and Nashville, Tennessee. They were also involved in the Freedom Rides.

=== 1980s to present ===
By the mid-1980s, enrollment declined and the university was deeply in debt. President Talbert O. Shaw (1988–2003) (not related to the namesake) increased the student body from 1,600 to 2,700, restructured debt and created the Raleigh Business and Technology Center.

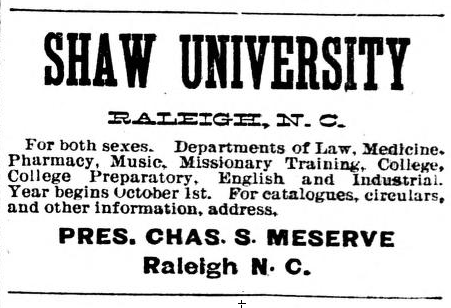
An ad for Shaw University from 1900, placed in a black-owned newspaper in Minnesota.

In the 1990s, Shaw ran a successful capital campaign to renovate historic buildings and construct new campus facilities, including the Talbert O. Shaw Center for Teachers' Education.

In 2005, Shaw University Divinity School (SUDS) received a 10-year accreditation from the Association for Theological Schools. The university also began construction on the Center for Early Childhood Education, Research and Development.

In 2009, the university's Institute for Health, Social, and Community Research was awarded a $4.3 million grant from the National Institutes of Health – National Center on Minority Health and Health Disparities (NCMHD) to implement The Shaw NCMHD Research Infrastructure in Minority Institutions (RIMI) Project. The RIMI Program is designed to establish a research capacity-building infrastructure program, with benchmarks for training students, and developing a cadre of clinical, biomedical and behavioral research scientists who possess the skills, knowledge and abilities to engage in leading, cutting-edge and innovative research and training that will ultimately contribute to reducing and eliminating health disparities in the United States.

During the tornado outbreak of April 14–16, 2011, the university was struck by a damaging tornado, resulting in the school cancelling classes for a semester. As a result of the storm, two dormitories, the student union, and the roof of Estey hall were severely damaged. There were minor injuries but no one was seriously hurt.

==== Study of World War II service of Black veterans ====
Shaw University led a research study to investigate why not a single African-American soldier who served in World War II had been awarded the Congressional Medal of Honor. The study concluded that racial discrimination had contributed to the military's overlooking the contributions of Black soldiers. The 272-page study recommended ten soldiers whose military records suggested they deserved the Medal of Honor. All ten had been awarded lesser medals during the war for actions the study's authors concluded merited the Medal of Honor. In January 1995, the team's findings were sent to the United States Department of Defense. In April 1996, officials at the Defense Department agreed that seven of the ten soldiers recommended in the report, should be awarded the Medal of Honor. President Bill Clinton awarded the Medals of Honor on January 13, 1997.

The department's decision in response to Shaw's study marked only the third time that the military re-evaluated military records to award the Medal of Honor. Only one of the seven nominees, 1st Lt. Vernon Baker of St. Maries, Idaho, was alive to receive his medal. Those who were awarded the Medal of Honor posthumously were: 1st Lt. Charles L. Thomas of Detroit, Michigan; Pvt. George Watson of Birmingham, Alabama; Staff Sgt. Edward A. Carter Jr. of Los Angeles, California; 1st Lt. John R. Fox of Boston, Massachusetts; Pfc. Willy F. James Jr. of Kansas City, Kansas; and Staff Sgt. Ruben Rivers of Tecumseh, Oklahoma. Their families received the medals.

== Campus ==
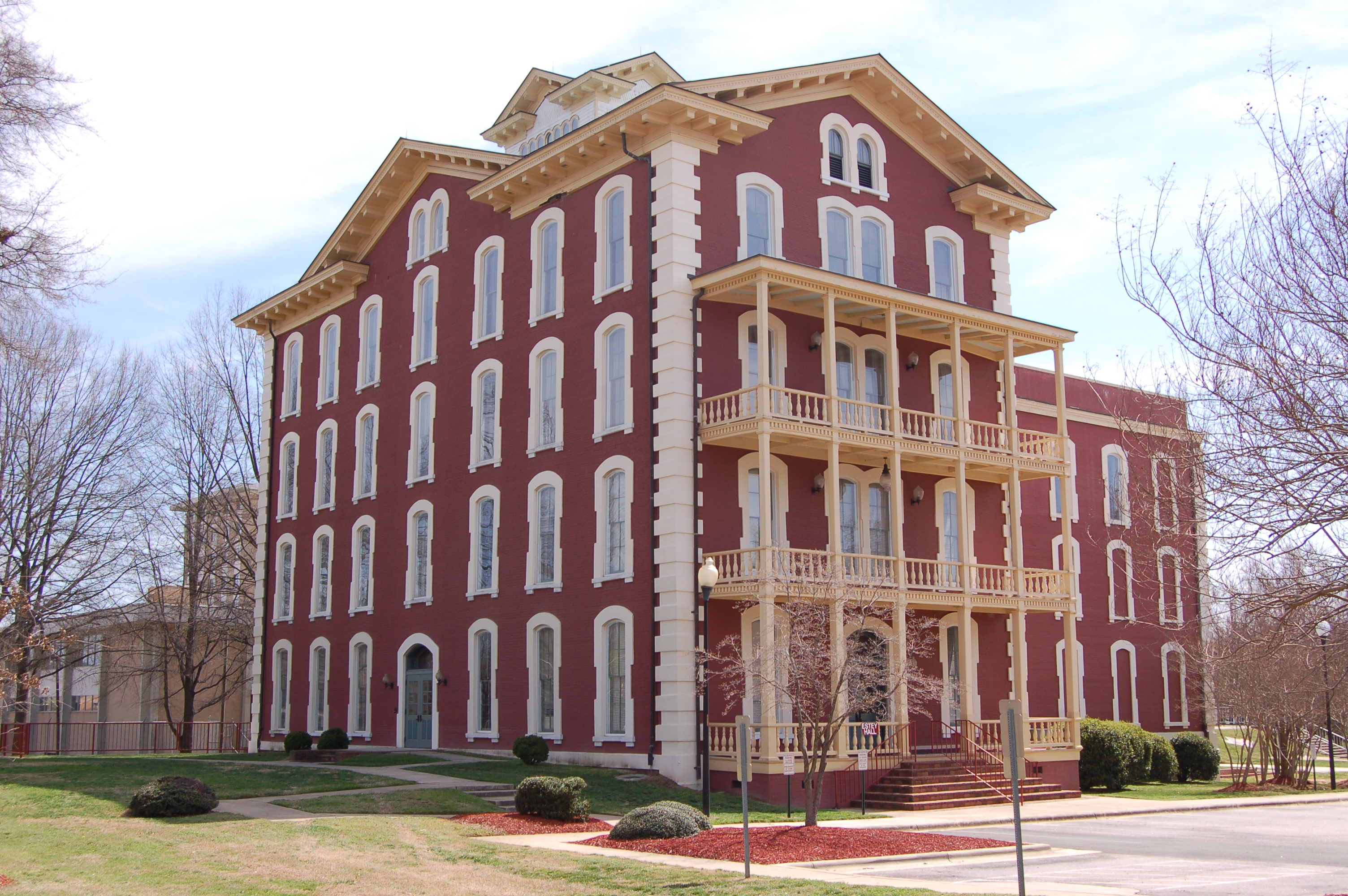
Estey Hall, c. 2008

Shaw University consists of 32 buildings and nine additional campuses across the state of North Carolina. As of July 2011, Durham County Stadium will remain the home of the Shaw University Bears football team until construction plans towards building a new facility on Shaw Farm (a 40-acre lot donated to the university under James Cheek's administration on Rock Quarry Rd. in Raleigh NC and the site of the National Alumni House) is completed and implemented. The main campus is located in the heart of downtown Raleigh. Five of the thirty-two buildings are national and state historic landmarks which are the Frazier House, Estey Hall, Tyler Hall, Leonard Hall, and the Rogers-Bagley-Daniels-Pegues House. The university has a memorial garden in the heart of the campus which is also the location of the tombs of the founder of Shaw University, Henry Martin Tupper and his wife Sarah and the university bell tower, that was erected in honor of those who came and left the university, from its founding to its present.

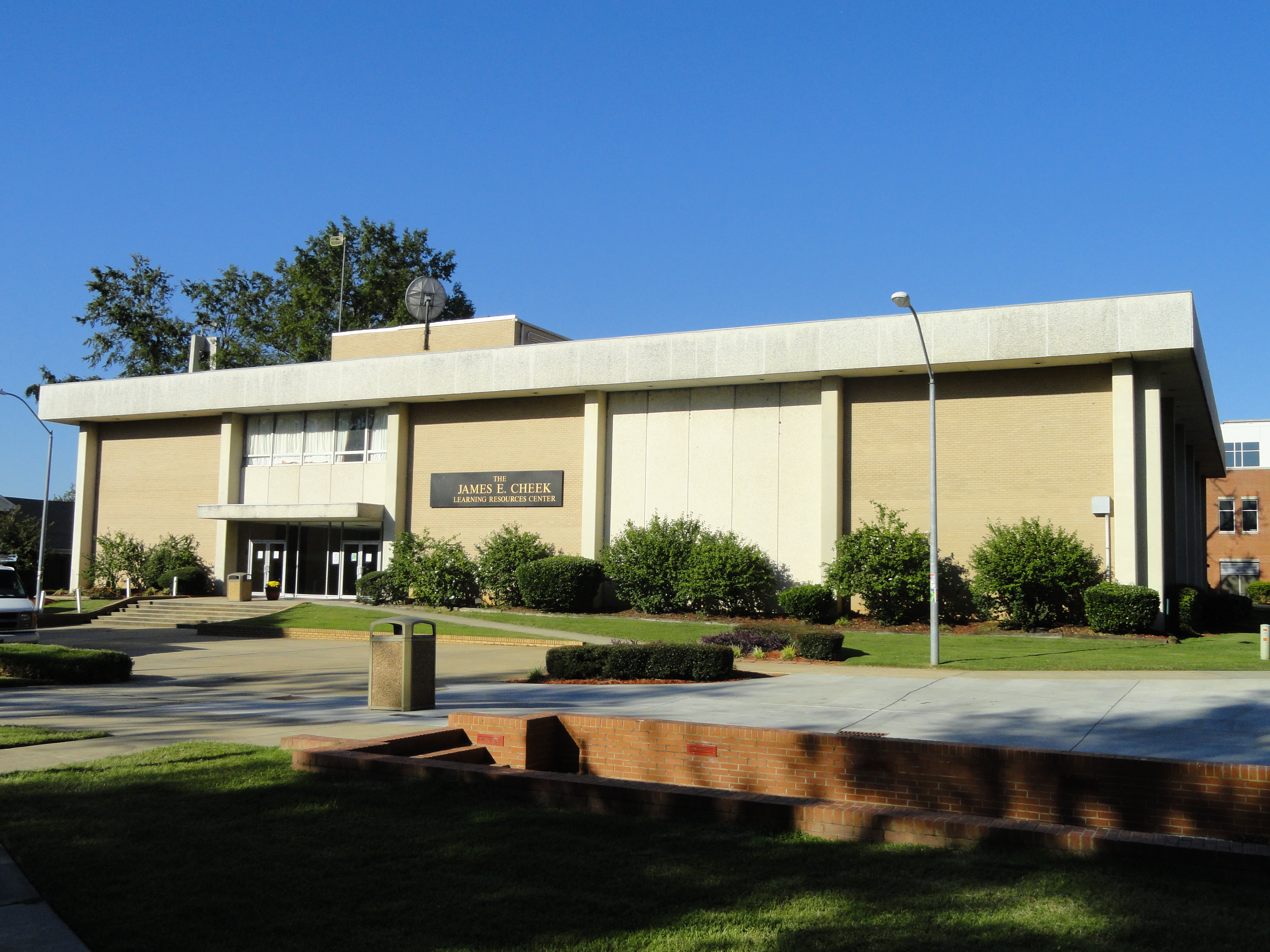
James E. Cheek Learning Resources Center

The university has three libraries, the James E. Cheek Library, the TOS Education Library, and the G. Franklin Wiggins Library, that houses over 210,000 volumes, 10,000 ebooks, many other sources of scholarly and cultural literature and microforms, located throughout Shaw University (including CAPE sites). The Raleigh Business and Technology Center is located on Shaw's campus. Planned in 1989, Shaw University city council officials and Saint Augustine's College in a joint effort built the current facility on Shaw's Campus. Both colleges use the center for classes and community programs. The Campus has four dorms, the Flemming-Kee Men's Dorm, the Dimple Newsome Dorm, Talbert O. Shaw Men's Dorm and the Talbert O. Shaw Women's Dorm. Other resources available on or adjacent to the campus are McDonald's, The Willie E. Gary Student Center which houses the Bear's Den (Game Room and Grill), and the Cyber Cafe'.

== Administration and organization ==
Shaw University consists of three academic schools: School of Arts and Sciences, School of Business and Professional Studies, and the School of Divinity. Undergraduate degrees are offered through the School of Arts and Science and the School of Business and Professional Studies. Graduate degrees are offered through the School of Divinity.

== Academics ==
Shaw is known for many significant historical achievements. It was the first university to offer a four-year medical school, the first to offer a school of pharmacy, and the first to offer a law school for freed slaves in the United States. The first building of higher education for African American women in the country was built and still resides on the campus of Shaw. Shaw is the alma mater of one United Nations General Assembly President, three founders of other North Carolina HBCUs, and numerous entertainers, lawyers, politicians, and educators.

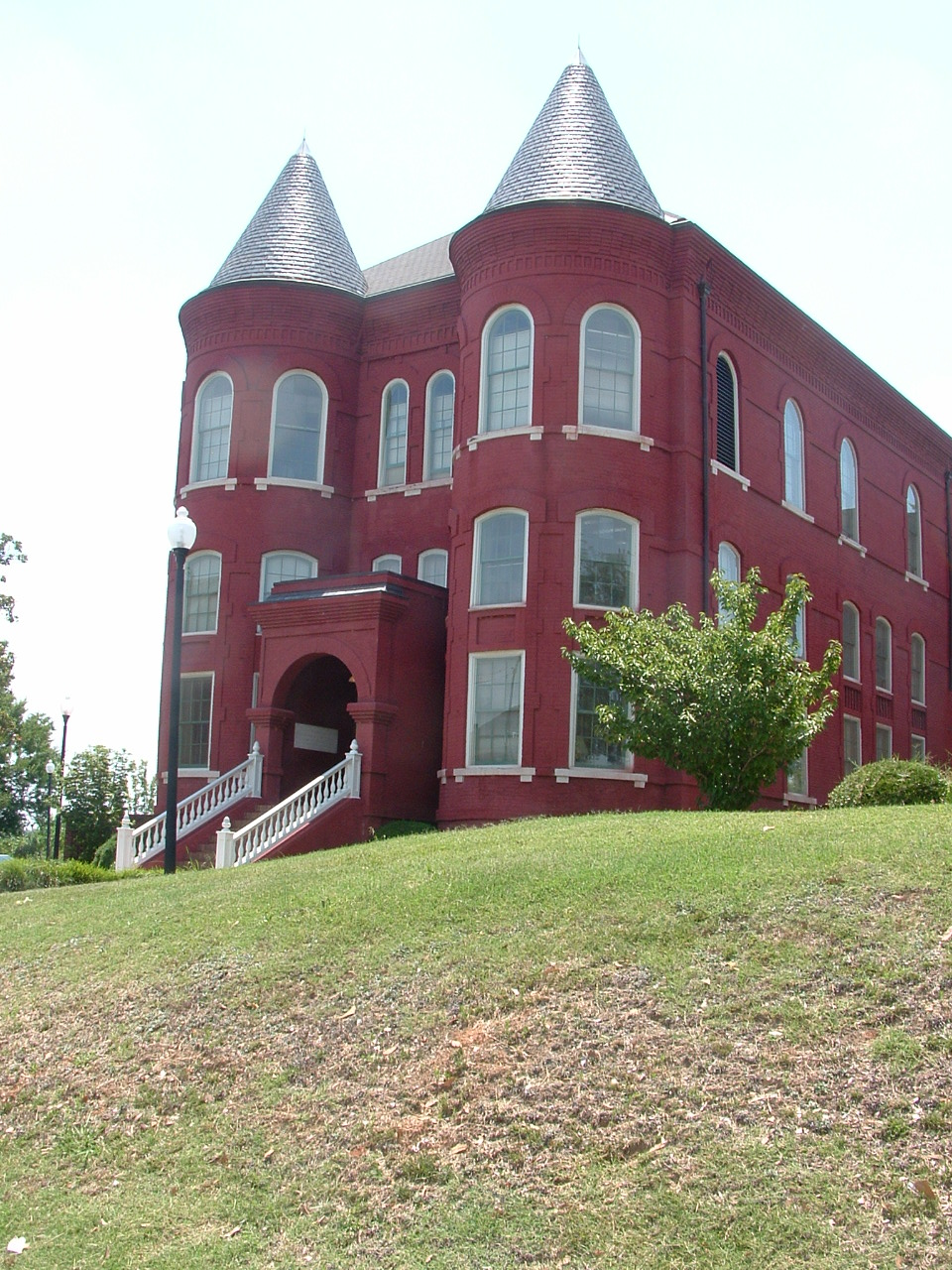
Leonard Hall, c. 2008

=== Accreditation ===
Shaw University is accredited by the Southern Association of Colleges and Schools, the Council on Social Work Education, and the American Psychological Association. The Divinity School is accredited by the Association of Theological Schools in the United States and Canada as its Allied Health Professions programs are accredited by the Commission on Accreditation of Allied Health Education Programs, the Commission on Accreditation of Athletic Training Education, and the National Council for Accreditation of Teacher Education.

Shaw has historical, symbolic, and ongoing affiliations with the American Baptist Churches, USA.

=== Undergraduate Profile ===
Shaw offers 21 arts and sciences majors for degrees in Bachelor of Arts (B.A.) or Bachelor of Science (B.S.). Shaw also offers a non-degree teaching certificate for individuals who have earned a bachelor's degree or higher in education or related major and wish the fulfill the requirements to obtain a teaching license. The majority of students enroll in the School of Arts and Sciences and the School of Business and Professional Studies.

=== Graduate Profile ===
The university's graduate and professional schools include the School of Divinity, which offers a Master of Divinity (MDiv), Master of Arts in Christian Education (MACE), and a Master of Arts in Christian Leadership (MACL), and the School of Business and Professional Studies, which offers a Master of Science in Early Childhood Education (MS) through the Department of Education and Child Development.

== Student life ==
Demographics of student body in fall 2021
	Undergraduate	U.S. Census
African American	56%	13%
Asian American	3%	6%
Non-Hispanic White American	1%	60%
Hispanic American	3%	19%
Two or more races	16%	3%
Unknown	15%	N/A
Non-resident alien	5%	N/A

=== Student body ===
The Shaw University student body consists of 1,170 undergraduate students, 92% of which attend on a full-time basis (as of fall 2021). The percentage of students who received an income-based federal Pell grant intended for low-income students is 84%.

Additionally, a new partnership with Wake County Public Schools beginning in August 2025 will have high school students from their two (single gender) leadership academies, WYWLA and WYMLA, attending on their campus. The two schools will have their Juniors and Seniors participating in dual enrollment at their respective schools and Shaw. This is expected to bring some 75-100 students on campus. Both schools had previously been partnered with another nearby HBCU, St. Augustine's.

=== Greek organizations ===
Shaw has eight of the nine National Pan-Hellenic Council organizations on campus.

=== Student organizations ===
Shaw University has a range of student organizations. The Student Government Association (SGA) is responsible for advising all other organization and representing the interests of other student organizations to university administration. Shaw University's quiz bowl team competed in the national Honda Campus All-Star Challenge tournament in 2015.

=== Marching band ===
Shaw's marching band, better known as "Platinum Sound", was reestablished in the Fall of 2002 along with the reestablishment of the football team. The band has grown from 80 members in 2002 to over 130 members. Shaw's marching band has participated in the Honda Battle of the Bands at the Georgia Dome in Atlanta, Georgia.

== Athletics ==
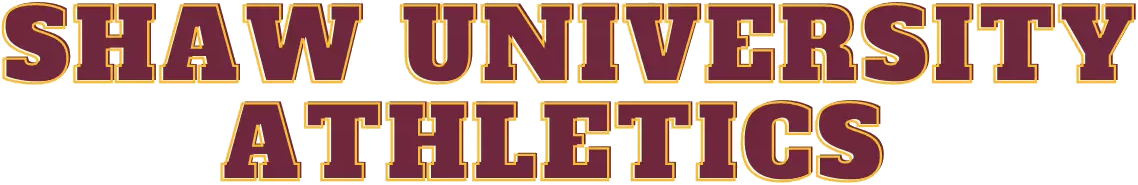
Shaw athletics wordmark

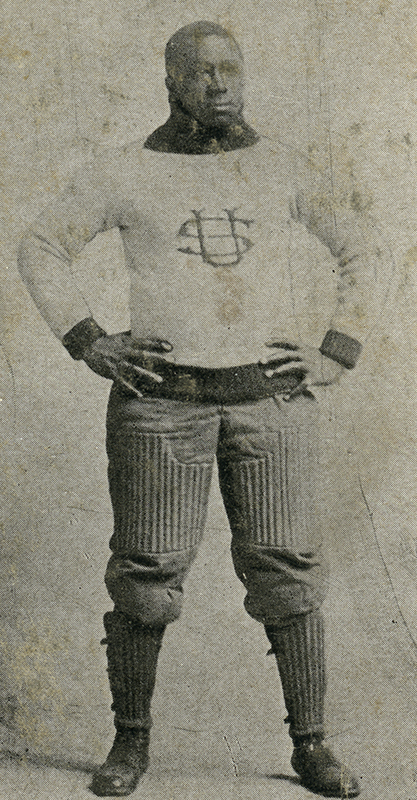
W. C. Strudwick (1884–1932) in Shaw University football uniform, future graduate from Leonard Medical School (class of 1912) and physician in Durham, North Carolina

Shaw University is a member and co-founder of the National Collegiate Athletic Association Division II's Central Intercollegiate Athletic Association (CIAA) Conference. Shaw University's Basketball team participates in the CIAA annual Basketball Tournament, which is the third most attended athletic event in collegiate sports after the Atlantic Coast Conference and Big East tournaments. Shaw fields 14 varsity athletic teams including teams in men's soccer, women's soccer, men's basketball, women's basketball, football, tennis, baseball, cheerleading, men's and women's track and field, volleyball, golf, and bowling. The athletic teams are known by the "Bears" nickname.

In 2002, Shaw University's men's basketball team won the CIAA championship. The women's basketball team won 9 CIAA championships from 2003 to 2014. The football team, reestablished by Clarence G. Newsome in 2002, played at Durham County Memorial Stadium in Durham, North Carolina, through the 2008 season. In 2009, the team relocated their home games to Millbrook High School in Raleigh.

The Bears currently play at Durham County Stadium. It won the CIAA football championship in 2004, 2007, 2008, and 2010. The football team has also made the Division II playoffs in 2007 and 2010. Also in 2011 both men's and women's teams won the CIAA Tournament making Shaw the last school since Norfolk State in 1975 to win the big three championships in the same year. Shaw's Lady Bears won the NCAA Division II Championship for the 2011–2012 season. The Shaw University Lady Bears have won the CIAA Tournament four years in a row twice (2003–2006) (2011–2014). Their most recent win occurred on March 1, 2014.

The Bears have won a total of 60 CIAA championships between men's and women's basketball, men's and women's tennis, football and volleyball.

== Alumni ==
Notable alumni include

- Ella Baker (1927), cofounder and leader of SNCC and civil rights activist
- Angie Brooks (B.S. 1949), first African female President of the United Nations General Assembly
- Shirley Caesar (B.S. 1984), pastor and gospel music artist
- John O. Crosby (1914), founder and first president of North Carolina A&T State University
- Marguerite Frierson (1928), educator
- Willie E. Gary (B.A. 1971), attorney
- Gladys Knight (B.A. 1966), lead singer of Gladys Knight & the Pips
- Peter Weddick Moore (A.B. 1887), founder and first president of Elizabeth City Normal College (now Elizabeth City State University)
- Adam Clayton Powell Jr. (D.D. 1934), Congressman from New York, 1945–71
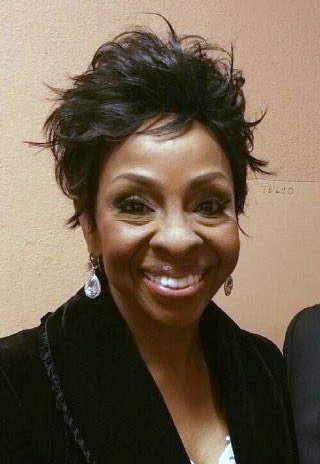
  Gladys Knight, lead singer of Gladys Knight & the Pips
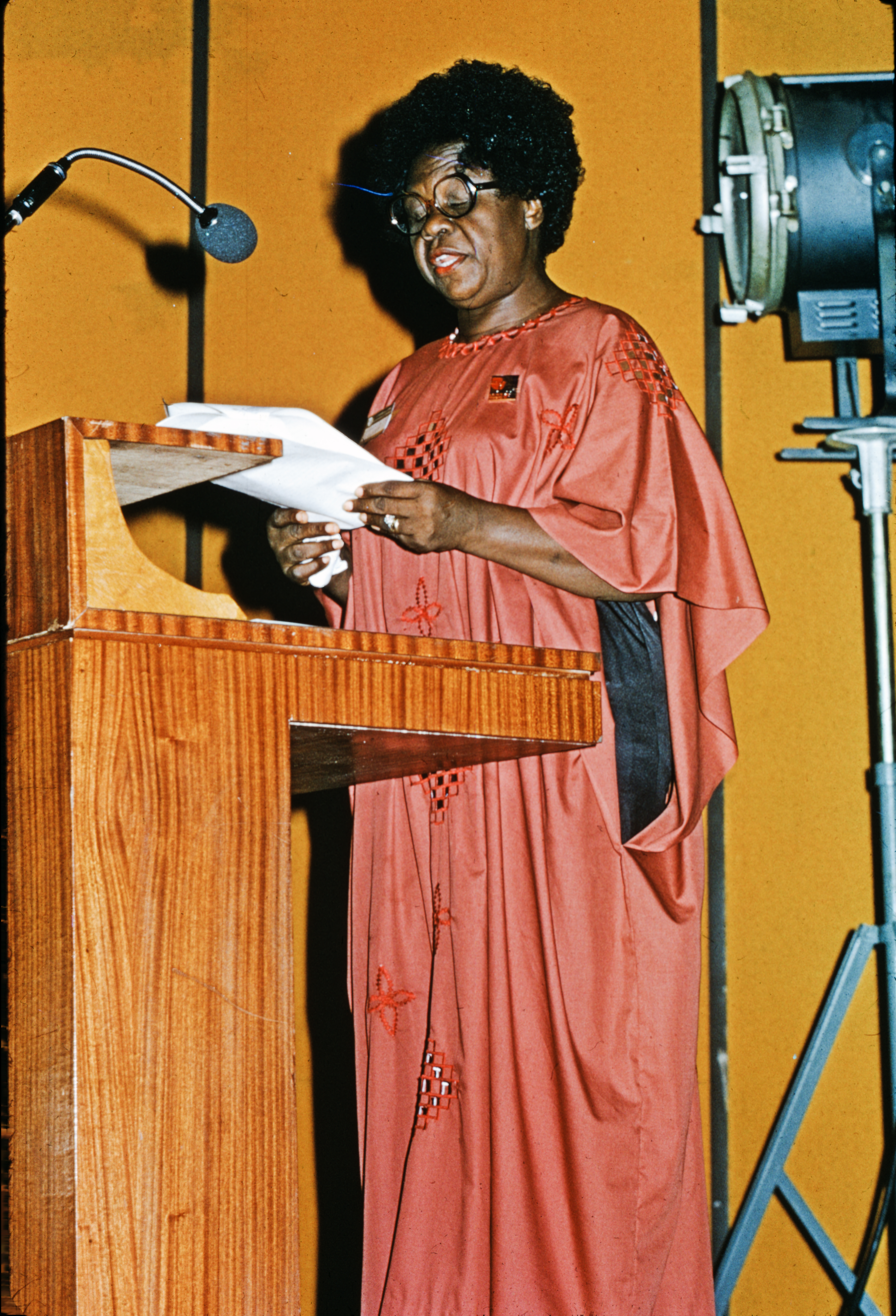
  Angie Brooks, first African female President of the United Nations General Assembly.

== See also ==
- List of Shaw University people
- List of historically black colleges and universities

== Additional references ==
- Carter, Wilmoth A. Shaw's Universe: A Monument to Educational Innovation, Raleigh: Shaw University, 1973, ASIN B0006W7GHM
- Lincoln, C. Eric, The Black Church in the African American Experience, Durham: Duke University Press, 1990 ISBN 978-0822310730
- Suttell, Brian. 2023. Campus to Counter: Civil Rights in Raleigh and Durham, North Carolina, 1960–1963. Macon, GA: Mercer University Press.
