= Cabarrus County Courthouse =

- U.S. National Register of Historic Places
- U.S. Historic district – Contributing property
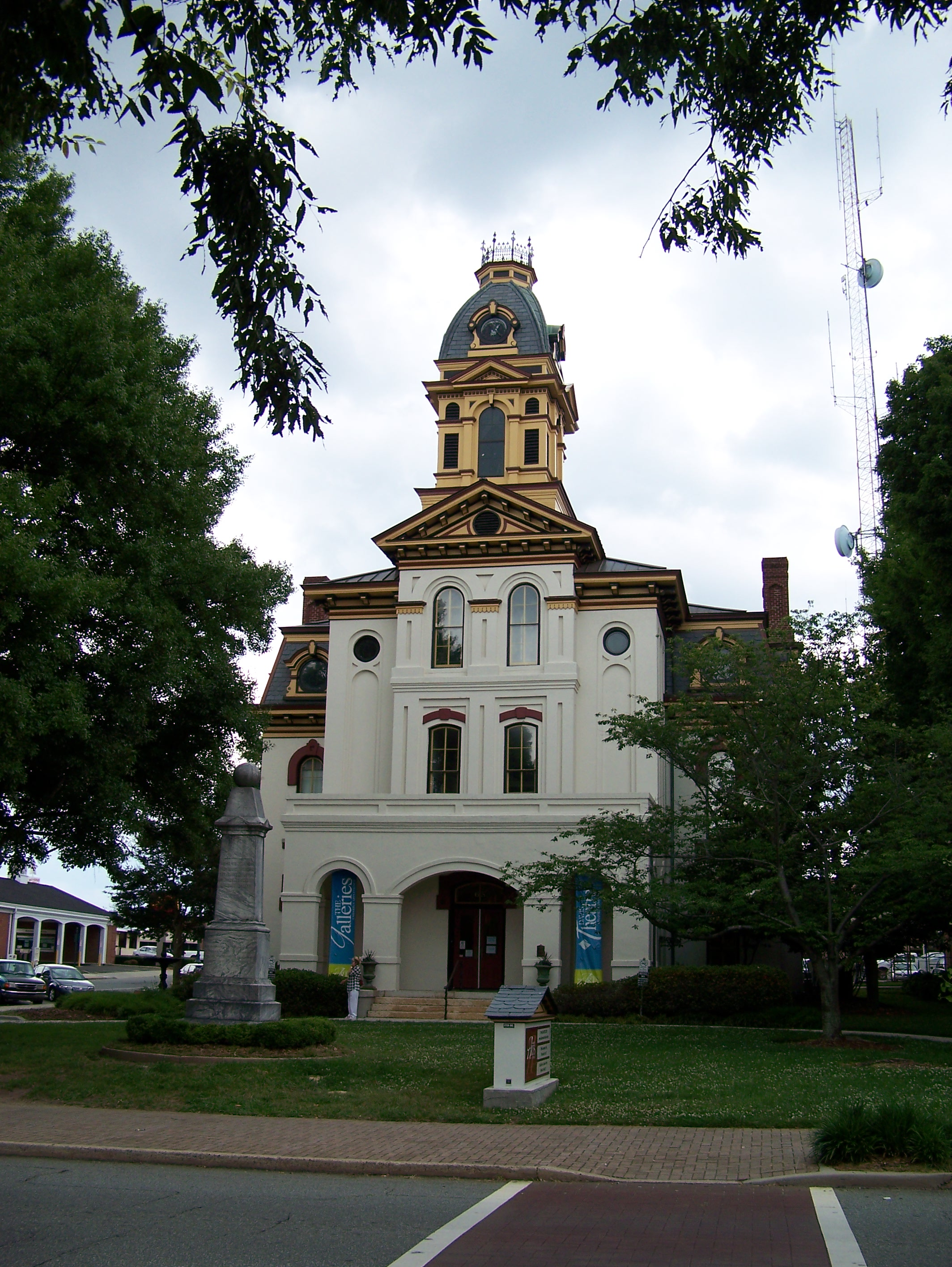
- 2012

- Location within North Carolina Location within the United States
- Location: 65 Union St., S., Concord, North Carolina
- Coordinates: 35.4095°N 80.5795°W
- Area: 2 acres (0.81 ha)
- Built: 1875
- Architect: G.S.H. Appleget
- Architectural style: Second Empire, Italianate, Classical Revival
- NRHP reference No.: 74001328
- Added to NRHP: June 5, 1974

The historic Cabarrus County Courthouse in Concord, North Carolina was completed in 1876, replacing one that was destroyed by fire just the previous year. It was designed by architect G.S.H. Appleget. It includes Second Empire, Italianate, Classical Revival, and other architecture. It was listed on the National Register of Historic Places in 1974. In 1975, a new courthouse was built; the historic courthouse is now the home of the Cabarrus County Veterans Museum and the Cabarrus Arts Council. The Historic Cabarrus Association Visitor Center is also located in the historic courthouse. It is located in the South Union Street Courthouse and Commercial Historic District.

Cabarrus County has constructed four courthouses since the creation of the county in 1792. The records show that the first court held for the county of Cabarrus was at the house of Robert Russell located on the Salisbury Road on the third Monday of January, 1793. In 1795 commissioners were named to build the first courthouse; it was very small, only thirty feet square, poorly lit and ventilated and inadequately heated. It was built at the center of the square which was the intersection of Union and Corban Streets; this structure was used for thirty years until a new courthouse was constructed in 1826.

== Civil War monument ==
A Confederate soldiers monument was dedicated May 5, 1892, by the Ladies' Memorial Association of Concord. Constructed of marble the eight sections weigh twenty-five thousand pounds with a sphere on top. The monument was placed in front of the courthouse where it remains.
