= WRKV =

- Raleigh, North Carolina; United States
- Broadcast area: Research Triangle Area
- Frequency: 88.9 MHz (HD Radio)
- Branding: K-Love

Programming
- Format: Contemporary Christian music
- Subchannels: HD2: Air1; HD3: K-Love Eras
- Network: K-Love

Ownership
- Owner: Educational Media Foundation

History
- First air date: 1968 (as WSHA)
- Former call signs: WSHA (1968–2018)
- Call sign meaning: "Raleigh's K-Love"

Technical information
- Licensing authority: FCC
- Facility ID: 60028
- Class: C2
- ERP: 50,000 watts
- HAAT: 139 meters (456 ft)
- Transmitter coordinates: 35°45′5.5″N 78°36′0″W

Links
- Public license information: Public file; LMS
- Webcast: Listen live
- Website: www.klove.com

WRKV (88.9 FM) is a radio station broadcasting a Contemporary Christian music format. Licensed to Raleigh, North Carolina, United States, the station serves the Research Triangle. The station is owned by Educational Media Foundation and features programming from K-Love.

WRKV broadcasts in the HD Radio format.

== History ==
In 1968, Shaw University became the first black college to own a radio station, broadcasting a Jazz/Gospel/Community Interest format as WSHA. At first, the station used an antenna on top of a building on the downtown campus, but in the late 1990s, a new tower was built in southeast Raleigh near Interstate 40. WFSS in Fayetteville, North Carolina, moved from 89.1 FM to 91.9 FM to allow WSHA to increase power. WFSS was bought by WUNC and now is part of the WUNC network.

In March 2018, Shaw University announced that it would sell the WSHA broadcast license to the Educational Media Foundation. The sale did not include the station's tower, call letters, or equipment; the university's interim president, Paulette Dillard, stated that Shaw intended to continue to stream jazz music on WSHA's website as an Internet radio station.

On July 26, 2018, the sale took effect. On August 7, 2018, the call letters were changed to WRKV.
