= Heck-Andrews House =

Historic house in North Carolina, United States

- U.S. National Register of Historic Places
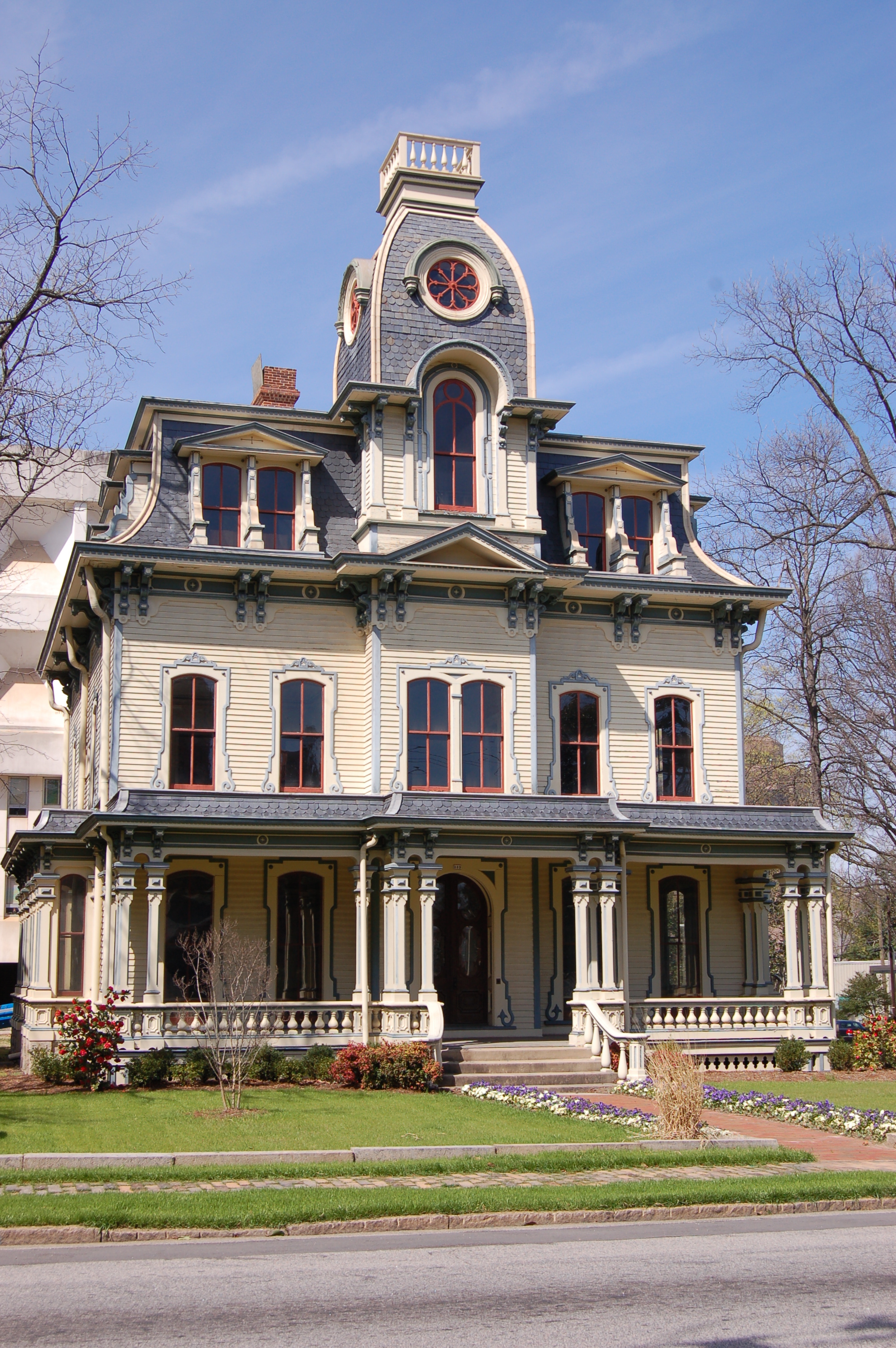

- Location within North Carolina Location within the United States
- Location: 309 N. Blount St., Raleigh, North Carolina
- Coordinates: 35°47′3.2496″N 78°38′11.9544″W
- Built: 1869–70
- Architect: Wilson & Waddell; Appleget, G.S.
- Architectural style: Second Empire
- NRHP reference No.: 72001000
- Added to NRHP: January 20, 1972

The Heck-Andrews House was finished in 1870 and was one of the first houses in Raleigh, Wake County, North Carolina to be constructed after the American Civil War. It is located at 309 North Blount Street. It was created by G.S.H. Appleget for Mrs. Mattie Heck, the wife of Colonel Jonathan McGee Heck. It is on the National Register of Raleigh Historic Property. The house has a dramatic central tower capped with a convex mansard roof with a balustrade. The central part of the 2 1/2-story, Second Empire style frame dwelling is enclosed with a concave mansard roof with patterned slate.

The house was owned by the Heck family until 1916 and was sold to A.B. Andrews. In 1948, Andrews heir sold the house to Julia Russell. The North Carolina government bought the house in 1987 planning to refurbish the structure. The exterior refurbishment was completed, however the State sold the house to the North Carolina Association of Realtors in January 2016 who plan on using it as an office building.

It was listed on the National Register of Historic Places in 1972.

== Sources ==
- Harris, Linda L., et al., An Architectural and Historical Inventory of Raleigh, North Carolina. Raleigh: City of Raleigh Planning Department and The Raleigh Historic Properties Commission, 1978.
