= List of Shaw University people =

This is a list of people associated with Shaw University, a historically black private college in Raleigh, North Carolina. It includes alumni, faculty, and presidents.

== Notable alumni ==
=== Academics ===
- James E. Cheek (B.A. 1955), president of Shaw University, president emeritus of Howard University, 1983 recipient of the Presidential Medal of Freedom
- John O. Crosby (1914), founder and first president of North Carolina A&T State University
- N. L. Dillard, (B.A. 1928), educator and principal of Caswell County Training School (later Caswell County High School)
- James B. Dudley (A.B. 1881), professor and president of North Carolina A&T State University (1896–1925)
- Edward Hart Lipscombe (A.B. 1879, A.M. 1882), educator, minister, principal of the Western Union Institute
- Peter Weddick Moore (A.B. 1887), founder and first president of Elizabeth City Normal College (now Elizabeth City State University)
- William L. Pollard (B.A. 1967), president of the Medgar Evers College (2009–2013)
- Evelyn Pope (B.A.), Dean of Library Sciences at North Carolina Central University
- Charles L. Purce (A.B.), president of Selma University and Simmons College of Kentucky
- Benjamin Arthur Quarles (B.A. 1931), historian, administrator, scholar, educator, and writer
- James E. Shepard (A.B. 1894), founder and first president of North Carolina Central University
- Ezekiel Ezra Smith (A.B. 1878), president of Fayetteville State University and U.S. ambassador to Liberia (1888–1890)

=== Arts and entertainment ===
- Shirley Caesar (B.S. 1984), pastor and gospel music artist
- Kayden Carter (B.A. 2012), professional wrestler in WWE
- Gladys Knight (honorary doctorate), singer, Gladys Knight & the Pips, member of the Rock and Roll Hall of Fame
- Lords of the Underground (attended), hip-hop group founded in the early 1990s, when all three of its members were students attending Shaw

=== Business ===
- Celeste Beatty (1984), first black female brewery owner
- Willie Otey Kay (1912), prominent dressmaker in Raleigh
- Calvin E. Lightner (1907 or 1908), architect and mortician
- William Gaston Pearson (1886), prominent principal, colloquially referred to as "Durham's Black Superintendent", in Durham, NC, and co-founder of Mechanics & Farmers Bank
- Ida Van Smith (1939), one of the first African American female pilots and flight instructors in the US

=== Civil rights ===
- Ella Baker (1927), leader of SNCC and civil rights activist
- Max Yergan (1914), civil rights activist; Spingarn Medal recipient

=== Government ===
- Angie Brooks (B.S. 1949), first African female president of the United Nations General Assembly and associate justice to the National Supreme Court of Liberia
- Henry Plummer Cheatham (A.B. 1882), Republican member of the United States House of Representatives 1889–1893
- Thomas O. Fuller, state senator of the North Carolina Senate in 1898
- George H. Jackson, Republican member of the Ohio House of Representatives 1892–1893
- Edward A. Johnson (B.L. 1891), first African-American member of the New York state legislature when he was elected to the New York State Assembly in 1917
- Luther Jordan (B.A. 1997), member of the North Carolina Senate 1993–2002
- Vernon Malone (1953), Democratic member of the North Carolina General Assembly, 14th Senate district, including constituents in Wake County
- Adam Clayton Powell Jr. (D.D. 1934), congressman from New York, 1945–71
- Rita Walters (1952), member of Board of Library Commissioners for the Los Angeles Public Library
- Charles D. Walton (B.A. 1971), first African-American member of the Rhode Island Senate
- James H. Young, prominent North Carolina politician and first African American to hold the rank of colonel in the United States of the volunteer regiment during the Spanish–American War

=== Law ===
- Willie E. Gary (B.A. 1971), one of the world's wealthiest attorneys, known as the "Whale Killer"; co-founder of the Black Family Channel
- Glenford Eckleton Mitchell (B.A. 1960), member of Universal House of Justice (1982–2008)
- Roger Demosthenes O'Kelly (B.L. 1909), lawyer, first deaf and black lawyer

=== Journalism ===
- Lenard Moore (B.A. 1980), first African American president of the Haiku Society of America
- Shelia P. Moses (B.A. 1983), best-selling author, nominated for the National Book Award and NAACP Image Award

=== Religion ===
- Richard Gene Arno, founder of the National Christian Counselors Association
- William R. Pettiford (1912 honorary), Birmingham, Alabama minister and banker
- Lucius Walker (1954), Baptist minister best known for his opposition to the United States embargo against Cuba

=== Science and medicine ===
- Clinton Caldwell Boone, physician, dentist, and minister
- John Eagles, pharmacy owner in Raleigh, North Carolina; son of John S. W. Eagles, sergeant in USCT, public official, and state legislator in North Carolina
- Louise Celia Fleming (1885), black medical missionary (1862–1899)
- John Walcott Kay (1912), prominent physician in Wilmington, co-founder of Community Hospital
- Aaron McDuffie Moore (1888), doctor and medical director
- Manassa Thomas Pope (1885), prominent physician in Raleigh; ran for mayor in 1919
- Lawson A. Scruggs (1887), physician and civil rights activist
- John P. Turner (1906), surgeon, hospital administrator, and educator

=== Sports ===
- Charlie Brandon (1964), Grey Cup champion and all-star CFL football player
- Van Green (1973), NFL player
- Julius Gregory (2011), Arena Football League player
- Carrenza M. "Schoolboy" Howard, Negro Leagues pitcher
- Ronald "Flip" Murray (2002), professional basketball player
- James "Bonecrusher" Smith (B.A. 1975), first heavyweight boxing champion with a college degree

== Notable faculty ==
- Helen Asemota, Nigeria-born biochemist and agricultural biotechnologist; professor 2005–2012
- Gaston Alonzo Edwards (1875–1943), African American architect, and educator; founded the building department

== Presidents of Shaw University ==
Presidents of Shaw University (* indicates alumni)
Name	Tenure	Notes
Henry Martin Tupper	1865–1893
Nicholas Franklin Roberts	1893–1894 (acting)
Charles Francis Meserve	1894–1919
Joseph Leishman Peacock	1920–1931
William Stuart Nelson	1931–1936
Robert Prentiss Daniel	1936–1950
William Russell Strassner	1951–1962
James Edward Cheek*	1963–1969
King Virgil Cheek*	1969–1971
J. Archie Hargraves	1971–1977
Stanley Hugh Smith	1978–1986
John Harding Lucas	1986–1987 (interim)
Talbert O. Shaw	1988–2002
Clarence G. Newsome	2003–2009
Dorothy Cowser Yancy	2009–2010 (interim)
Irma McClaurin	2010–2011
Dorothy Cowser Yancy	2011–2013
Gaddis Faulcon	2013–2015 (interim)
Tashni-Ann Dubroy*	2015–2017
Paulette Dillard	2017–present
