= Queen City Drug Company =

Drug business company in Charlotte North Carolina

Queen City Drug Company was a drugstore business established in Charlotte, North Carolina. It was incorporated in 1892 and was the first Black owned and operated store in the city. It had a soda fountain. It was established by partners John Taylor Williams (Charlotte's first African American doctor), Manassa T. Pope (the city's second African American doctor) and R.B. Tyler. It was one of the city's most successful African American businesses in the 1890s. Pope's house in Raleigh, now the Pope House Museum, is listed on the National Register of Historic Places.

The store was located at 422 East 2nd Street in Charlotte's Brooklyn neighborhood. John Taylor Williams served as its president. The building was demolished in the 1960s for an urban renewal redevelopment project.
