= Masonic Temple Building (Fayetteville Street, Raleigh, North Carolina) =

Historic building in North Carolina, US

- U.S. National Register of Historic Places
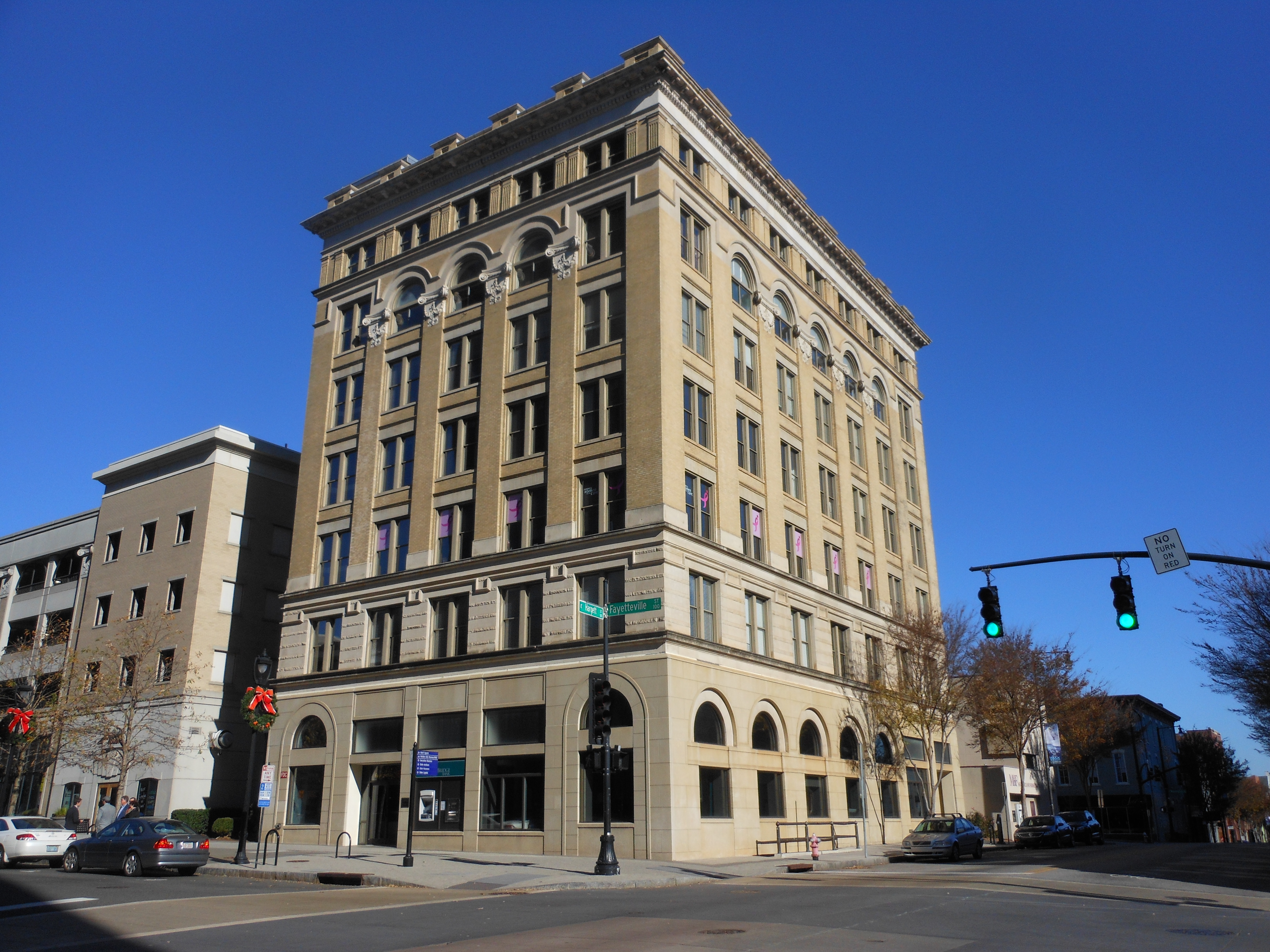
- Modern view of the Masonic Temple Building

- Location within North Carolina Location within the United States
- Location: Raleigh, North Carolina
- Coordinates: 35°46′26.83″N 78°38′12.47″W
- Built: 1907
- Architect: Charles McMillan, architect; Carolina Construction Co., builder
- Part of: Fayetteville Street Historic District (ID07001412)
- NRHP reference No.: 84002533
- Added to NRHP: May 3, 1979

The Masonic Temple Building located at 133 Fayetteville Street in Raleigh, North Carolina was the state's first reinforced concrete skyscraper. Constructed in 1907 by Grand Lodge of North Carolina, the building represents the growth of Raleigh in the early 20th century and rise of the influence of Masons. The Masonic Temple Building was added to the National Register of Historic Places in 1979 and is a Raleigh Historic Landmark.

It's one of two Raleigh places of the same name on the National Register of Historic Places, the other being the Masonic Temple Building located on Blount Street, which was also built in 1907.

== History ==
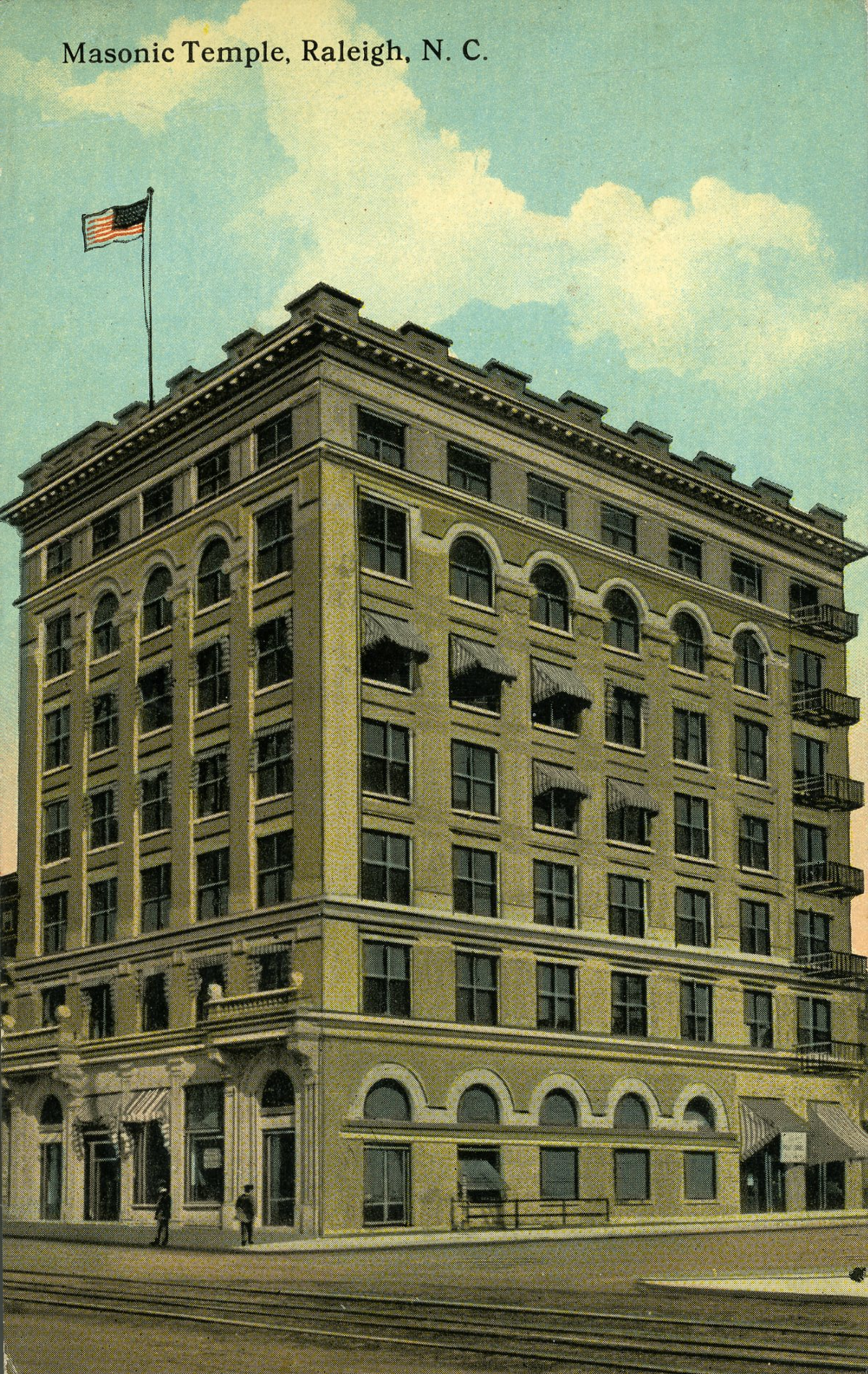
Masonic Temple Building historic view

The seven-story Masonic Temple Building was designed by South Carolina architect Charles McMillan and built by Carolina Construction Co. Upon completion, the building was praised for its innovative construction due to the use of reinforced concrete, a new concept in building materials. The design is a conservative and classic example of the tri-partite skyscraper composition developed by Louis Sullivan. The first three floors are covered with Indiana limestone. The rest of the building consists of light brick ornamented with terra cotta.

One year after the founding of Raleigh in 1792, the first Masonic lodge, Democratic Lodge, No. 21, opened. Due to increased membership, the Masons raised funds for the construction of a new temple. The Masonic Temple Building, once used by local lodges and the state Grand Lodge, contained retailers on the first floor and offices throughout the rest of the building. The Masons sold the property on Dec 2, 1946 to Land's, Inc. The Grand Lodge moved to its current site at 2921 Glenwood Ave and the Masonic Temple groups relocated to the former Josephus Daniels House. Today, the downtown building continues to provide commercial and office space.

== See also ==
- List of Registered Historic Places in North Carolina
