= Pope House Museum =

Historic house in North Carolina, United States

- Dr. M.T. Pope House
- U.S. National Register of Historic Places
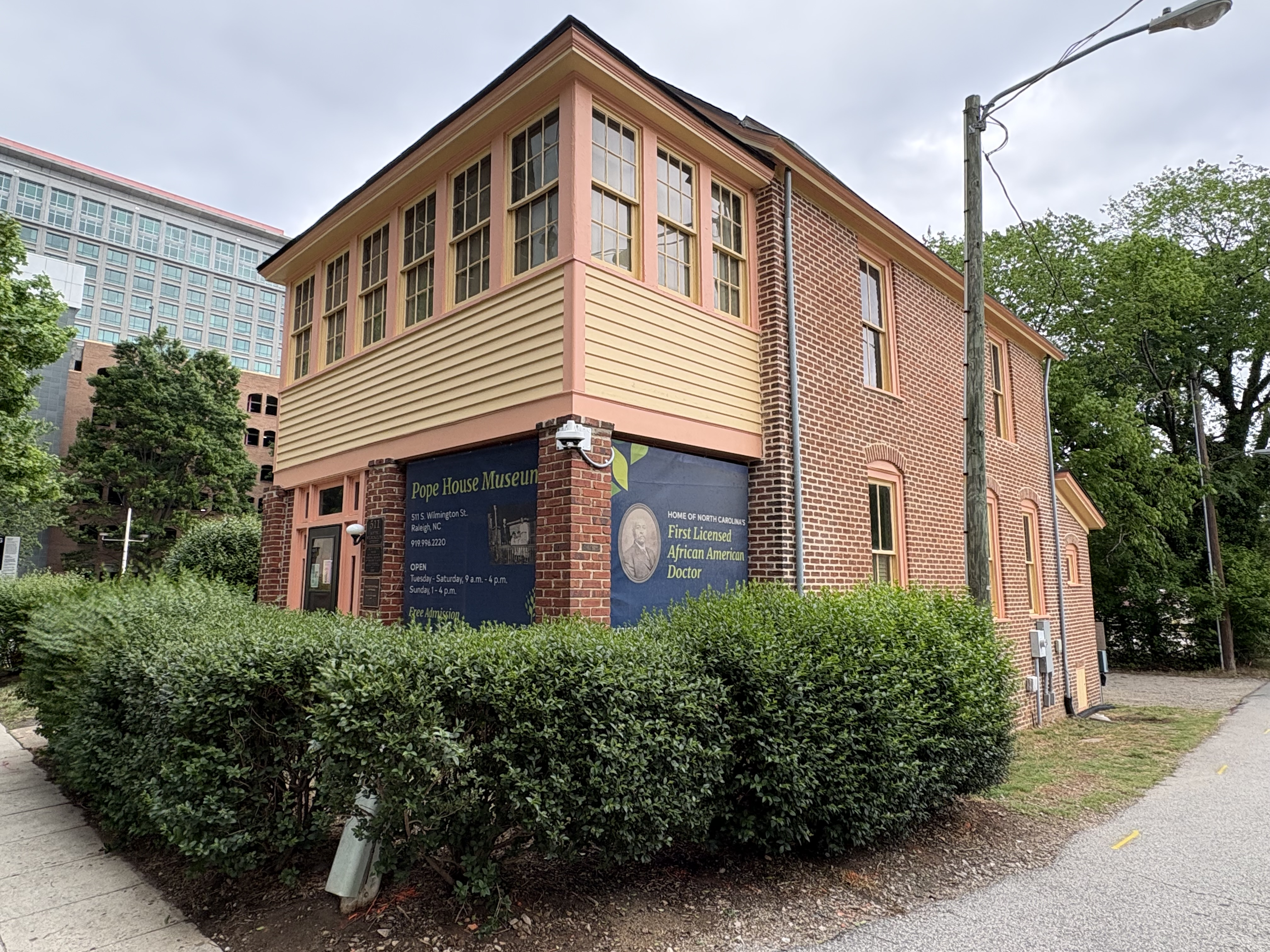
- Pope House Museum in 2026

- Location within North Carolina Location within the United States
- Location: 511 S Wilmington St., Raleigh, North Carolina
- Coordinates: 35°46′24″N 78°38′19″W
- Area: 0.1 acres (0.040 ha)
- Built: 1900
- Architectural style: Two-story gable front
- NRHP reference No.: 99001392
- Added to NRHP: November 22, 1999

The Pope House Museum, built in 1901, is a restored home once owned by Dr. Manassa Thomas Pope, a prominent African-American citizen of Raleigh, North Carolina. The Pope House is listed on the National Register of Historic Places in 1999, It was an official project of the Save America’s Treasures Program and the city of Raleigh took over management of it, offering tours for the first time in 2012.

== History ==
Since the early 19th century, the area where the Pope House is located has gone through many transformations. When the original governor’s mansion was built at the end of Fayetteville Street on the site of the present Memorial Auditorium, it was thought that fashionable residences would be built nearby. Although a few substantial homes were constructed by white families, when Reverend Henry Martin Tupper moved Shaw University to the neighborhood in 1870, many new African-American residents drawn to Raleigh after the Civil War settled in the area. Pope attended Leonard Medical Center at Shaw University before beginning his medical practice.

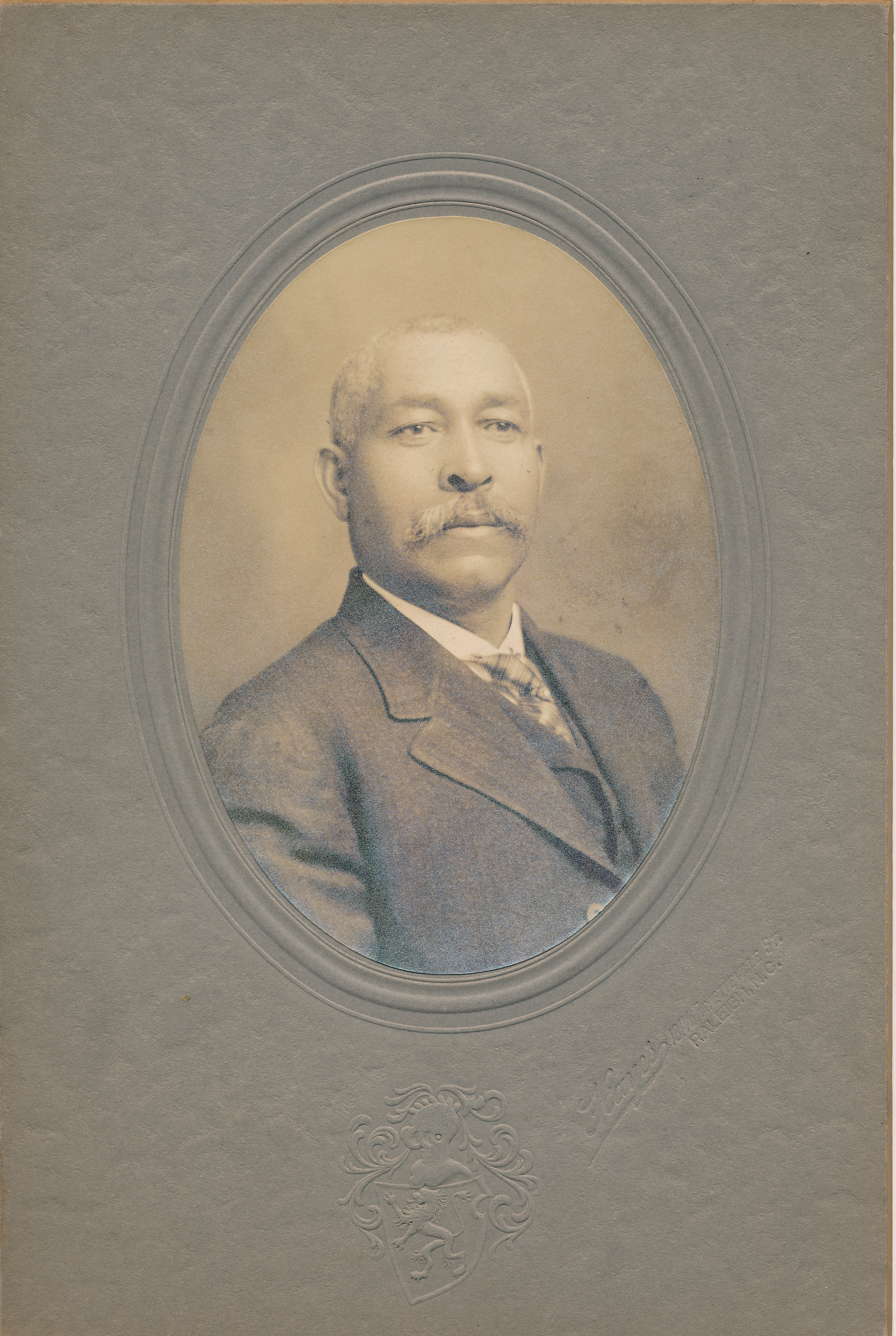
Dr. M.T. Pope, circa 1900

Black professionals began to build homes in the area known as the Third Ward, which included the 500 block of South Wilmington Street. In 1901, Pope decided to build his house in this area. Pope’s neighbors included other prominent African Americans, including another doctor and a pharmacist. His home was located near his office on East Hargett Street, which at the time was the heart of the black business district.

Pope installed the latest technology in his home, including combination gas and electric fixtures, a kitchen with running water, a full bathroom on the second floor, coal burning heating stoves, and a telephone. He also installed a call bell system, with buttons in each room and an annunciator in the back hall. Pope began to see patients in the house during the 1920s and 1930s, when his health began to fail. The small area at the rear of the back hall, adjacent to the kitchen, was configured to include a small hand sink and built-in cabinet for instruments.

After Pope married Delia Haywood Phillips in 1907, the couple added a garage and wired the home for electricity. In the 1920s, the original front porch was removed, and the current sleeping porch constructed on brick piers. In the 1940s, the northern half of the first floor space below the porch was enclosed with brick, as it remains today. They eventually had two children, Evelyn and Ruth. After the deaths of their parents, Evelyn and Ruth maintained the family home, though they lived in Durham and Chapel Hill respectively.

Although the Pope House remains in the neighborhood, the area around it has dramatically changed. Older homes and businesses were replaced with office buildings, parking lots and newer homes. The most evident change was the construction of the Raleigh Convention Center directly across the street from the house. Today, the house is in the shadows of skyscrapers that were built in the 1980s and 1990s.

The Pope House was officially listed on the National Register of Historic Places on November 22, 1999. The following month the trustees of the Pope Charitable Foundation decided to begin the process of turning the house into a museum. One month later, The Pope House Museum Foundation was incorporated as a non-profit organization. The extensive family papers were sorted and catalogued, and donated to the Southern Historical Collection at the University of North Carolina at Chapel Hill. In 2011 due to financial concerns, the Pope House Museum approached the city of Raleigh about purchasing the Pope House Museum to ensure its survival. Since the purchase, the Pope House Museum has been managed by Raleigh Parks and Recreation which has opened the Pope House Museum for regular tours for the first time.

== See also ==
- National Register of Historic Places listings in North Carolina
