= Gaston Alonzo Edwards =

American architect, educator (1875–1943)

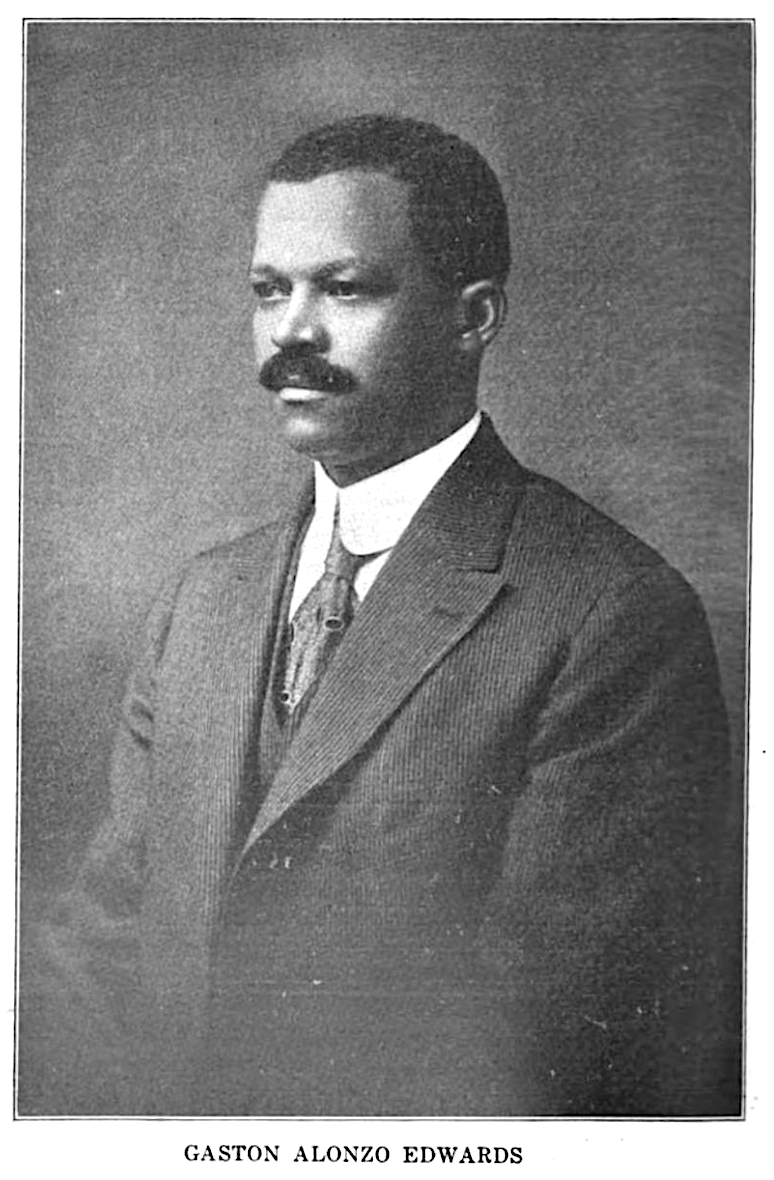

President of Kittrell College
- In office 1917–1929

Personal details
- Born: April 12, 1875 Belvoir, North Carolina, United States
- Died: October 5, 1943 (aged 68) United States
- Resting place: Mount Hope Cemetery, Raleigh, North Carolina, U.S.
- Spouse: Catherine Ruth Norris (m. 1909–1943; his death)
- Children: 5
- Education: Agricultural and Mechanical College for the Colored Race (BS), Cornell University (MS)
- Occupation: Architect, educator, academic administrator
- Known for: First Black licensed architect in North Carolina

Gaston Alonzo Edwards (1875–1943) was an American architect, educator, and academic administrator. He served as president of Kittrell College. Edwards was the first African American licensed architect in the state of North Carolina. He also went by the name G.A. Edwards.

== Early life and education ==
Gaston Alonzo Edwards was born on April 12, 1875, in Belvoir, North Carolina. He was one of six children, the son of Mary Foushee Edwards, and William Gaston Snipes; his mother was Black, and his father was White. Interracial marriage was not legal at this time, and his parents lived as neighbors adjacent to each other. As a child, he attended local schools and worked at night as a barber and a farmhand.

Edwards attended the Agricultural and Mechanical College for the Colored Race (now known as North Carolina A&T State University) at Greensboro, North Carolina, and graduated with a B.S. degree in 1901. He continued his education, and graduated with a M.S. degree in 1909 from at Cornell University in Ithaca, New York.

== Career ==
After graduation, Edwards established the mechanical department at the Institution for Education of the Deaf, Dumb, and Blind (later known as Governor Morehead School) in Raleigh, North Carolina.

He later took a role at Shaw University in Raleigh, North Carolina, where he started as a teacher of natural sciences, and the superintendent of the men's industrial department. While working at Shaw University, he grew his architectural career where he took interest in neoclassical and Romanesque revival architecture. He founded the building department at Shaw University after 15 years of working at the school. The Leonard Medical School at Shaw University was being designed by a White architect, and Edwards noticed a problem with the design that could cause danger or injury. He brought up the issue with the building design, the White architect was fired, and Edwards finished the design of the building.

In 1909, Edwards married Catherine Ruth Norris, a music student at Shaw. He designed and built structures for the American Baptist Home Mission Society, and was the first African American to do so. In 1912, Edwards was appointed by the state governor to serve as a delegate for the third annual Negro National Educational Congress. On March 25, 1915, Edwards became a licensed architect in the state of North Carolina, and was the first African American to hold this title.

From 1917 to 1929, Edwards served as the president of Kittrell College, a HBCU in Kittrell, North Carolina. He moved to Durham, North Carolina in 1929. Edwards died on October 5, 1943. He was buried in Mount Hope Cemetery in Raleigh, North Carolina.

Edwards is profiled in the book, African American Architects: A Biographical Dictionary, 1865–1945 (2004).

== List of notable buildings ==
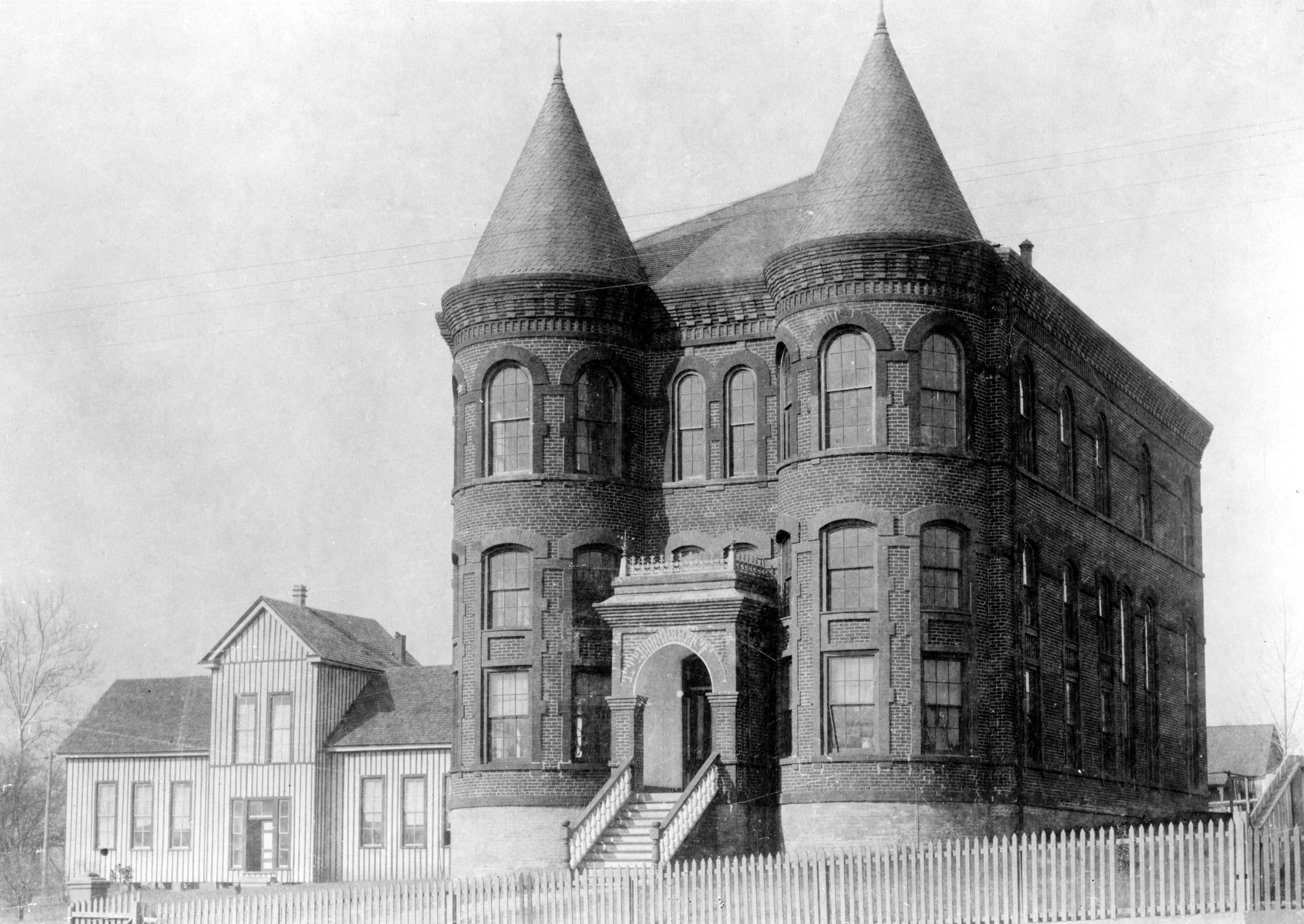
Leonard Hall at Shaw University in Raleigh

- Masonic Temple (1907), 427 S. Blount Street, Raleigh, North Carolina, U.S.
- St. Paul A.M.E. Church renovation (1909), Raleigh, North Carolina, U.S.
- Shaw University buildings, Raleigh, North Carolina, U.S.
  - Leonard Medical School (1912), Shaw University
  - Tyler Hall (1910), Shaw University

== See also ==
- African-American architects
- List of Shaw University people
