= Belvoir, North Carolina =

- Census-designated place
- Location within the state of North Carolina
- Coordinates: 35°42′40″N 77°28′12″W
- Country: United States
- State: North Carolina
- County: Pitt

Area
  - Total: 1.98 sq mi (5.12 km^{2})
  - Land: 1.98 sq mi (5.12 km^{2})
  - Water: 0 sq mi (0.00 km^{2})
- Elevation: 30 ft (9.1 m)

Population (2020)
  - Total: 315
  - Density: 159.4/sq mi (61.54/km^{2})
- Time zone: UTC-5 (Eastern (EST))
  - Summer (DST): UTC-4 (EDT)
- ZIP code: 27834
- Area code: 252
- FIPS code: 37-04955
- GNIS feature ID: 2584309

Belvoir is a census-designated place within Belvoir Township, Pitt County, North Carolina, United States. As of the 2020 census, Belvoir had a population of 315.

It is located six miles northwest of Greenville along North Carolina Highway 222. Notable people from Belvoir include Gaston Alonzo Edwards (1875–1943).

== Demographics ==
Historical population
Census	Pop.	Note	%±
2020	315		—
U.S. Decennial Census
