= Masonic Temple Building (Blount Street, Raleigh, North Carolina) =

Historic building in North Carolina, US

- U.S. National Register of Historic Places
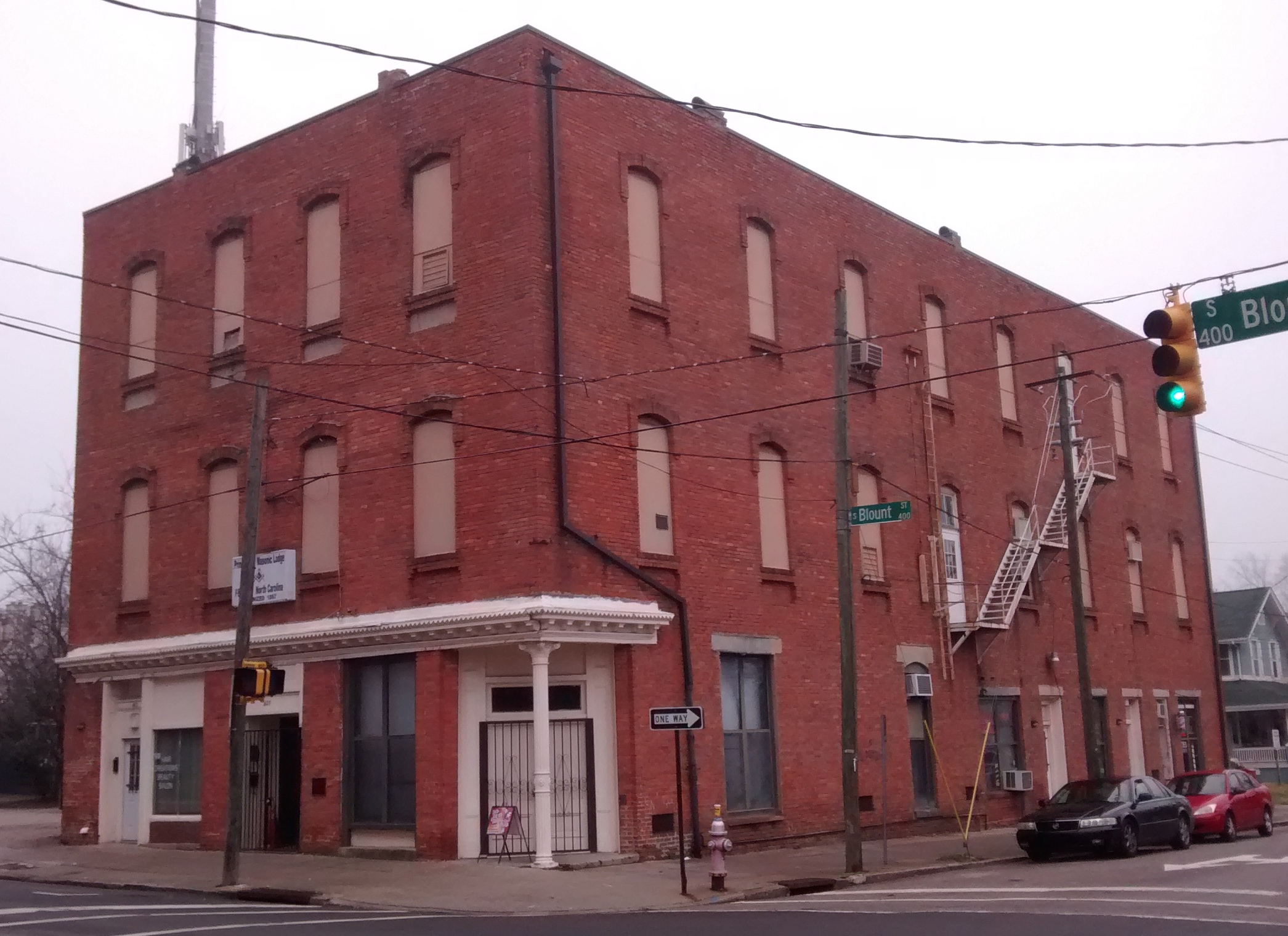

- Location within North Carolina Location within the United States
- Location: 427 South Blount St., Raleigh, North Carolina, United States
- Coordinates: 35°46′27″N 78°38′12″W
- Built: 1907
- Architect: Gaston Alonzo Edwards
- NRHP reference No.: 84002533
- Added to NRHP: May 3, 1984

The Masonic Temple Building, built in 1907, is an historic Prince Hall Masonic building located at 427 South Blount Street in Raleigh, North Carolina, U.S.. On May 3, 1984, it was added to the National Register of Historic Places, for its social contributions to Black history.

== History ==
It is a three-story, red brick flat roofed building. It has a metal cornice at the top of the first floor level and a cast iron Corinthian order column at the corner. It was designed by Black architect Gaston Alonzo Edwards.

It is one of two places of the same name in Raleigh on the National Register of Historic Places, the other being the much larger Masonic Temple Building, Fayetteville Street (Raleigh, North Carolina), which was also built in 1907.

Today it is occupied by Widow's Son Lodge #4 and Excelsior Lodge #21 as well as barber shops and a beauty salon.

== See also ==
- Prince Hall Freemasonry
