= Belvoir Township, Pitt County, North Carolina =

Belvoir Township
- Township
- Interactive map of Belvoir Township
- Coordinates: 35.708°N 77.465°W
- Country: United States
- State: North Carolina
- County: Pitt

Area
  - Total: 55.2 sq mi (142.9 km^{2})
  - Land: 54.7 sq mi (141.8 km^{2})
  - Water: 0.39 sq mi (1.0 km^{2})
- Elevation: 39 ft (12 m)

Population (2010)
  - Total: 9,334
  - Density: 170.5/sq mi (65.83/km^{2})
- Time zone: UTC-5 (Eastern (EST))
  - Summer (DST): UTC-4 (EDT)
- ZIP code: 27834
- Area code: 252
- FIPS code: 37-22640
- GNIS feature ID: 1020208

Belvoir Township is a township in Pitt County, North Carolina. The population was 9,334 at the 2010 census. The township is a part of the Greenville, North Carolina metropolitan area located in North Carolina's Inner Banks region. It includes the census-designated place of Belvoir, North Carolina.

== Geography ==
Belvoir is located at latitude 35.708 and longitude -77.465.

According to the United States Census Bureau, the town has a total area of 55.2 square miles (142.9 km^{2}), of which 54.7 square miles (141.8 km^{2}) is land and 0.39 square miles (1.0 km^{2}), or 0.72%, is water.

== Demographics ==
As of the census of 2010, there were 9,334 people living in the township. The racial makeup of the town was 30.7% White, 51.5% African American, 0.5% American Indian or Alaska Native, 0.4% Asian, 0.3% Native Hawaiian or other Pacific Islander, 13.5% from some other race, and 3.1% from two or more races. Hispanic or Latino of any race were 19.3% of the population.

In the town the population was spread out, with 30.3% under the age of 18, 9.4% from 18 to 24, 27.5% from 25 to 44, 24.5% from 45 to 64, and 8.3% who were 65 years of age or older. The median age was 32.4 years. Males made up 48.8% of the population, and females made up 51.2%.

At the 2000 census, the median income for a household in the town was $36,149, and the median income for a family was $46,549.
