= Leonard Hall (Shaw University) =

Historic educational building built in 1881

Coordinates: 35.7702°N 78.6390°W

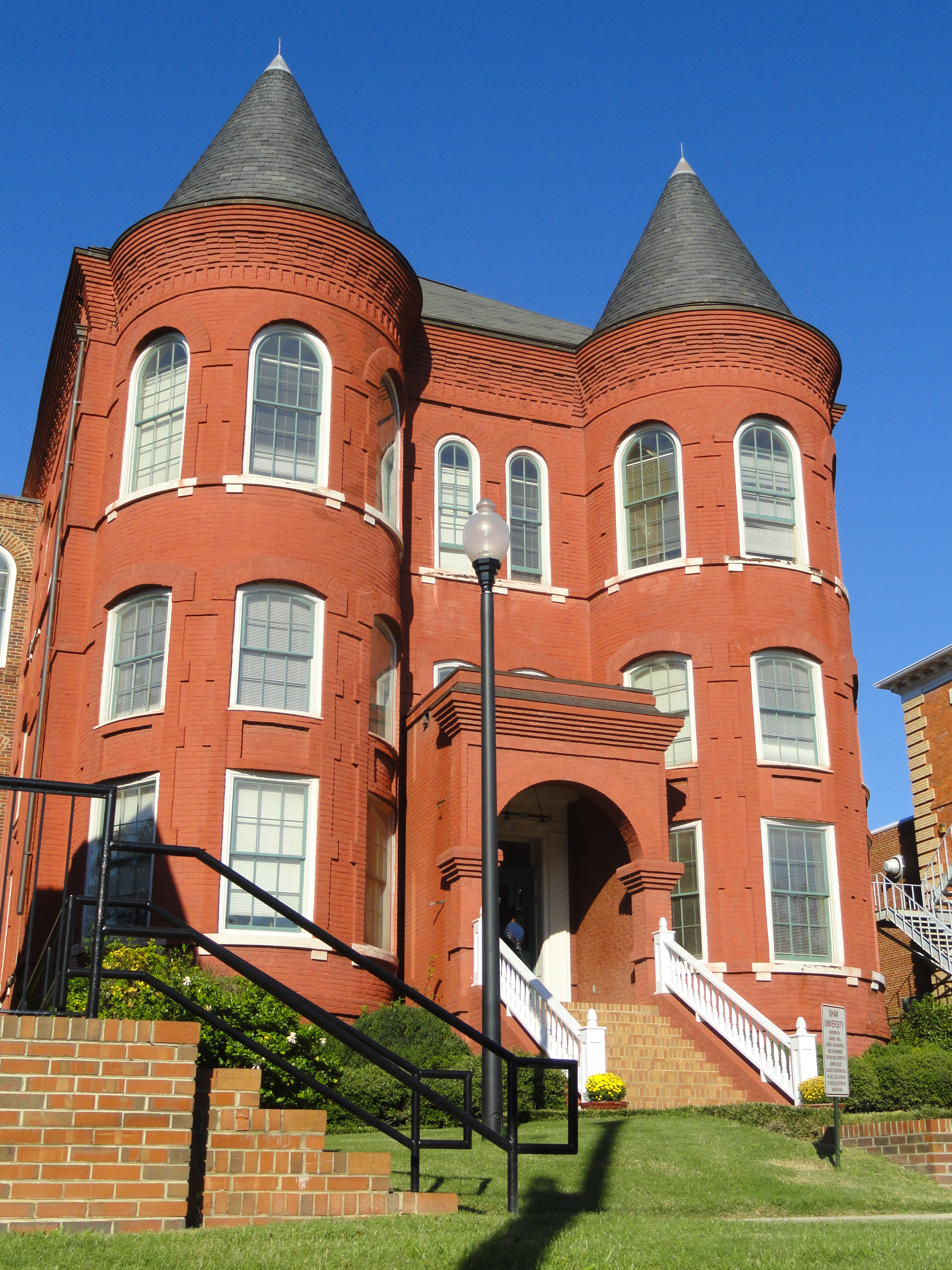
- Leonard Hall in 2011
- Interactive map of the Leonard Hall area
- Former names: Leonard Medical Center

General information
- Architectural style: Romanesque Revival
- Location: Shaw University, Raleigh, North Carolina

Design and construction
- Architect: Gaston Alonzo Edwards

Leonard Hall is a historic educational building located on the campus of Shaw University in Raleigh, North Carolina. Built in 1881 and originally named Leonard Medical Center, it became known as Leonard Medical School, and then Leonard Hall. It was established when medical schools were professionalizing and was the first medical school in the United States to offer a four-year curriculum. It was also the first four-year medical school that African Americans could attend.

The building was named after Judson Wade Leonard, the brother-in-law of Shaw's founder Henry Martin Tupper. Classes began in 1882 and the annual tuition was $60, a substantial sum at the time. It is a contributing part of the East Raleigh-South Park Historic District, listed in the National Register of Historic Places in 1990. In 1994 it was designated a North Carolina Historic Landmark.

Shaw University is the oldest historically black college in the South and often called the "mother of African-American colleges in North Carolina", because its alumni founded other colleges. It is named after Elijah Shaw, an entrepreneur from Massachusetts who contributed financially for the establishment of the school.

On March 31, 1886, it awarded the college's first medical degrees to six men. Leonard Medical Center was one of fourteen medical schools founded in the late 19th century for the education of African-Americans. Describing the history of the building, then-President Talbert O. Shaw said, "For Shaw University and the black community, it stands out as one of the bastions of education for our people. We are very proud of it."

== History ==
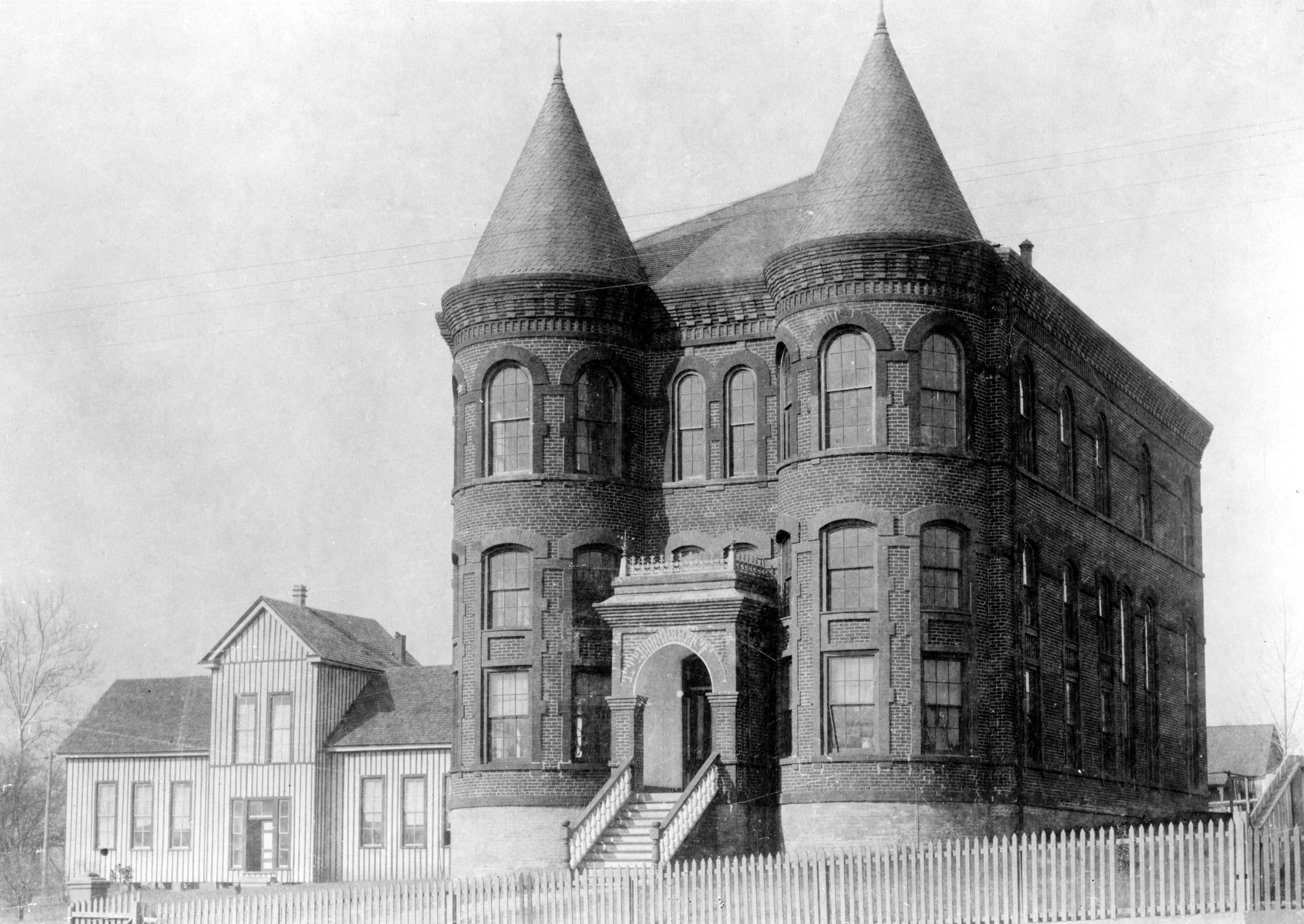
1899 view

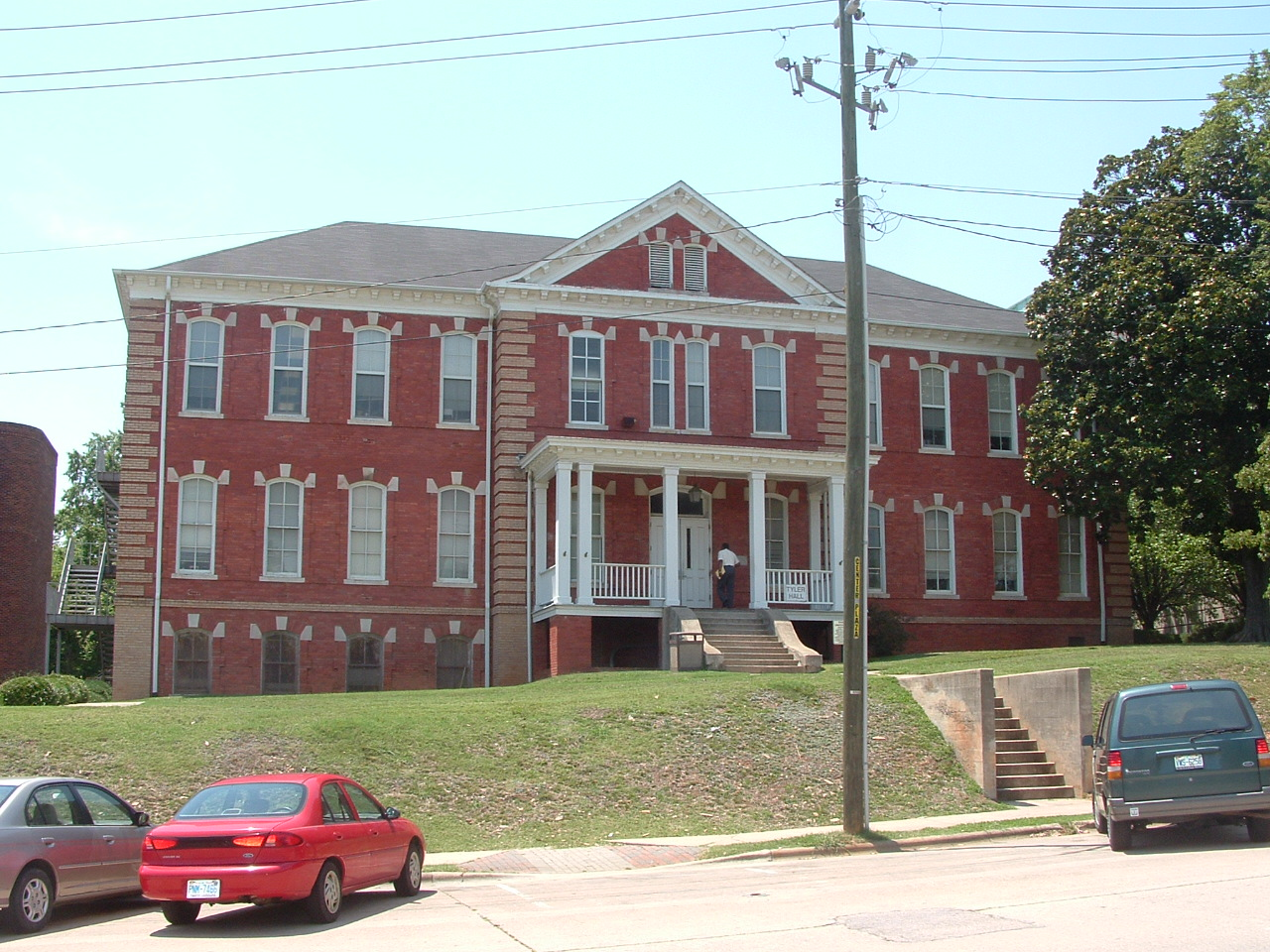
2008 view of Tyler Hall, formerly the hospital adjacent to Leonard Hall

In 1865, the university was founded by Rev. Henry Martin Tupper and his wife Sarah Leonard Tupper, American Baptists, to educate freedmen following the Civil War. Donations from people such as Judson Wade Leonard and Jacob Estey assisted in developing the college's growing campus. Estey donated money for construction of Estey Hall, first in the nation built for the education of African-American women.

In 1881, Leonard Hall began operating as the first four-year medical school in the country. Leonard Hall, Leonard Medical Center's first building, opened in 1882. It was named after Judson Wade Leonard, Sarah Tupper's brother, who donated money to help construct the school.

Leonard Hall held classrooms. A 34-bed medical dormitory and a 25-bed hospital were constructed next to it, the latter in 1910. The medical school complex was used to train Christian physicians serving African Americans. Prominent faculty members at the medical school included Kemp B. Battle Jr., son of President Kemp P. Battle of University of North Carolina at Chapel Hill; and Wisconsin I. Royster, great-uncle of Wall Street Journal editor Vermont C. Royster.

Leonard Hall served as a medical school until 1918, when financial problems arose from rising costs associated with implementing recommendations of the Flexner Report on Medical Education for curriculum, research, and medical equipment. During its 36-year history, the school graduated nearly 400 physicians, most of whom provided critical services to underserved populations throughout the South. After the medical school closed, Leonard Hall continued to serve as a classroom building until 1986 when a fire destroyed the roof.

In 2000, a $3.6 million grant from the Historically Black Colleges and Universities Fund and corporate donations resulted in the building's restoration. The historic facility is now used for classes and administrative offices. In 2006 the North Carolina Highway Historical Marker Program installed a plaque to mark the location of Leonard Hall.

== Architecture ==
The twin-turreted brick building is of the Romanesque Revival style. The two corner towers feature arched bay windows and a rear addition with a matching corbelled cornice was later added to the building. The architect of Leonard Hall is unknown, but many believe it was Gaston Alonzo Edwards, a Shaw faculty member and designer in 1910 of the Leonard Hospital. To save on construction costs, Shaw students made the bricks for the building.

== Alumni ==
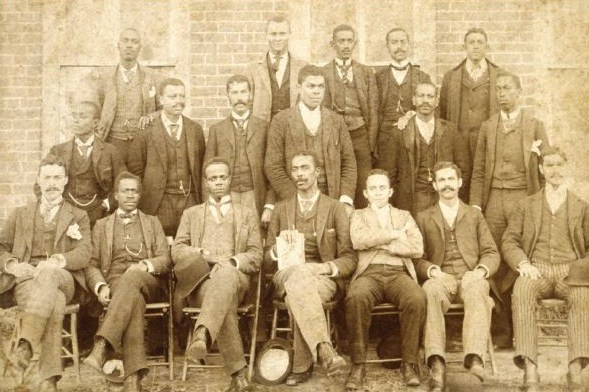
Students at Leonard Medical Center in the late 19th Century

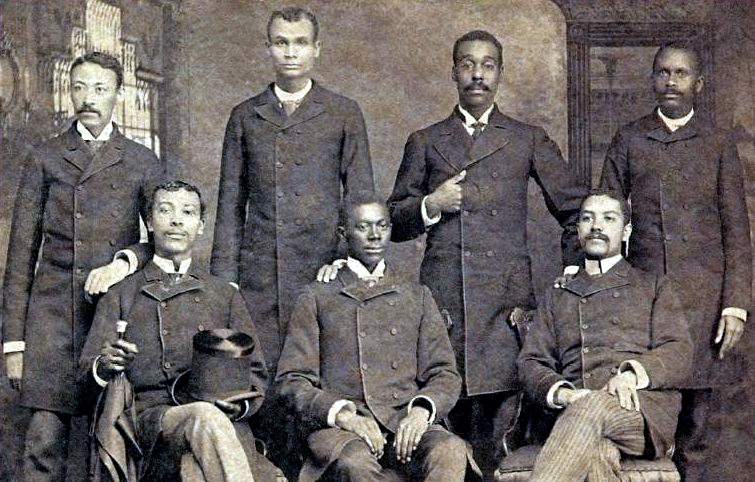
Graduating class of 1889. M.T. Pope (class of 1886) is seated to the left on the front row.

Nearly every member of the first graduating class of 1886 went on to have a notable career and was deeply involved in civic life. Manassa Thomas Pope became a prominent physician in Raleigh and was also involved in local politics of the capital. During the time of racial segregation imposed disfranchisement, Pope was one of only seven African-American men in the city of Raleigh who managed to register to vote. He went on to run for mayor of Raleigh in 1919 on a non-partisan ticket with Calvin E. Lightner. His home is now a registered landmark and museum.

J.T. Williams practiced medicine at the Good Samaritan Hospital in Charlotte and was twice elected to the Board of Aldermen. Williams was appointed an ambassador to Sierra Leone by President William McKinley, serving from 1898 to 1907. J.T. Williams Middle School in Charlotte is named after him.

Class valedictorian Lawson Andrew Scruggs founded the Old North State Medical Society, the nation's oldest association of black physicians. He also founded a tuberculosis sanatorium in Southern Pines that treated many people from Raleigh.

Aaron McDuffie Moore, graduate of the 1888 class, became the first African-American physician in Durham. He co-founded the North Carolina Mutual Insurance Company, the largest and oldest black-owned business in the United States. Moore convinced philanthropist Washington Duke to build a hospital instead of a monument as a better way to honor black troops who fought for the Confederate Army during the Civil War.

Clinton Caldwell Boone, earned the Doctor of Medicine degree in 1910 at Leonard Hall. He had already spent years in the Congo as a missionary. Upon graduation in 1910 he was posted to the newly developing Republic of Liberia to represent the Lott Carey Foreign Mission Convention as a medical missionary Liberia. He helped to build a schoolhouse and hospital in the Congo, as well as a school in Liberia. Also became the President of the first church in Liberia, Providence Baptist Church, founded by Lott Carey in 1822.

George Louis Alphonso Pogue graduated from the medical school at Leonard Hall with a Doctor of Medicine in 1911. In 1912 Pogue moved his family to Bedford Virginia where he opened an integrated pharmacy at 111 S Bridge Street. He served the community in a number of ways and saw patients in his office and home until his death March 6, 1956.

John Walcott Kay graduated from the medical school in 1912. He went on to own and operate his own medical practice in Wilmington, North Carolina and co-founded the city's first hospital for African-Americans. His home in Wilmington is now a historic property.
