= East Hargett Street (Raleigh, North Carolina) =

Street and historically African American neighborhood in Raleigh, North Carolina

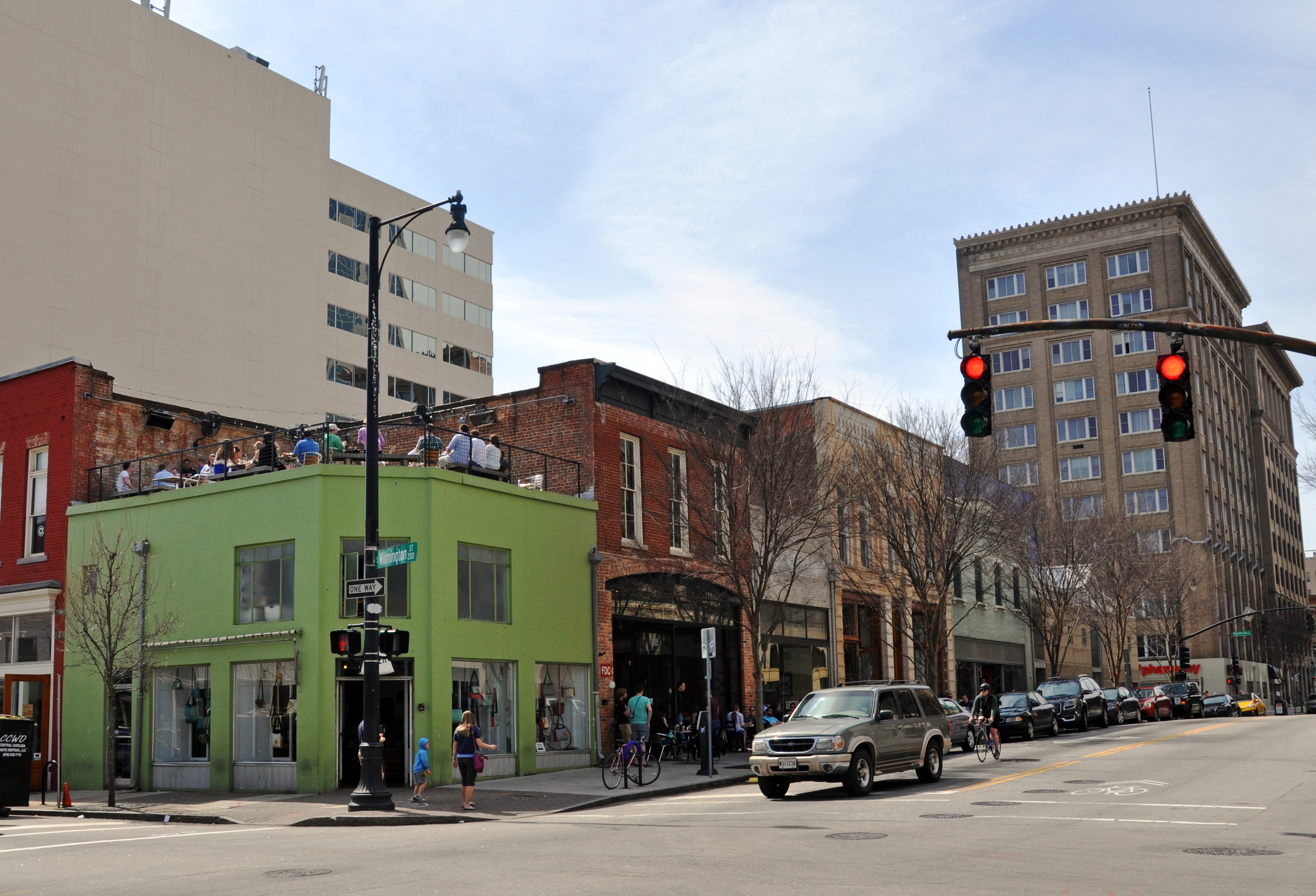
East Hargett Street at the intersection with Wilmington Street, 2014

East Hargett Street is a street in downtown Raleigh, North Carolina. It was plotted in 1792 as one of the original streets in the city, and in the early 1900s hosted a concentration of black-owned businesses, thus earning the monikers "Black Main Street"/"Negro Main Street". The street experienced an economic decline in the 1960s.

== History ==
=== Establishment ===
Hargett Street was plotted in 1792 as one of the first streets in Raleigh, North Carolina. It was named for Frederick Hargett, one of the commissioners tasked with planning the city. Initially, Hargett was host to a mix of residential and commercial spaces. In 1800 the city market was established along East Hargett. A cluster of saloons and bars were established in the area, which were collectively referred to as "Grog Alley". The market was moved in 1840, but by 1860 East Hargett was dominated by businesses and thus the only other street in Raleigh to join Fayetteville Street in serving as the city's business district.

=== Black Main Street ===
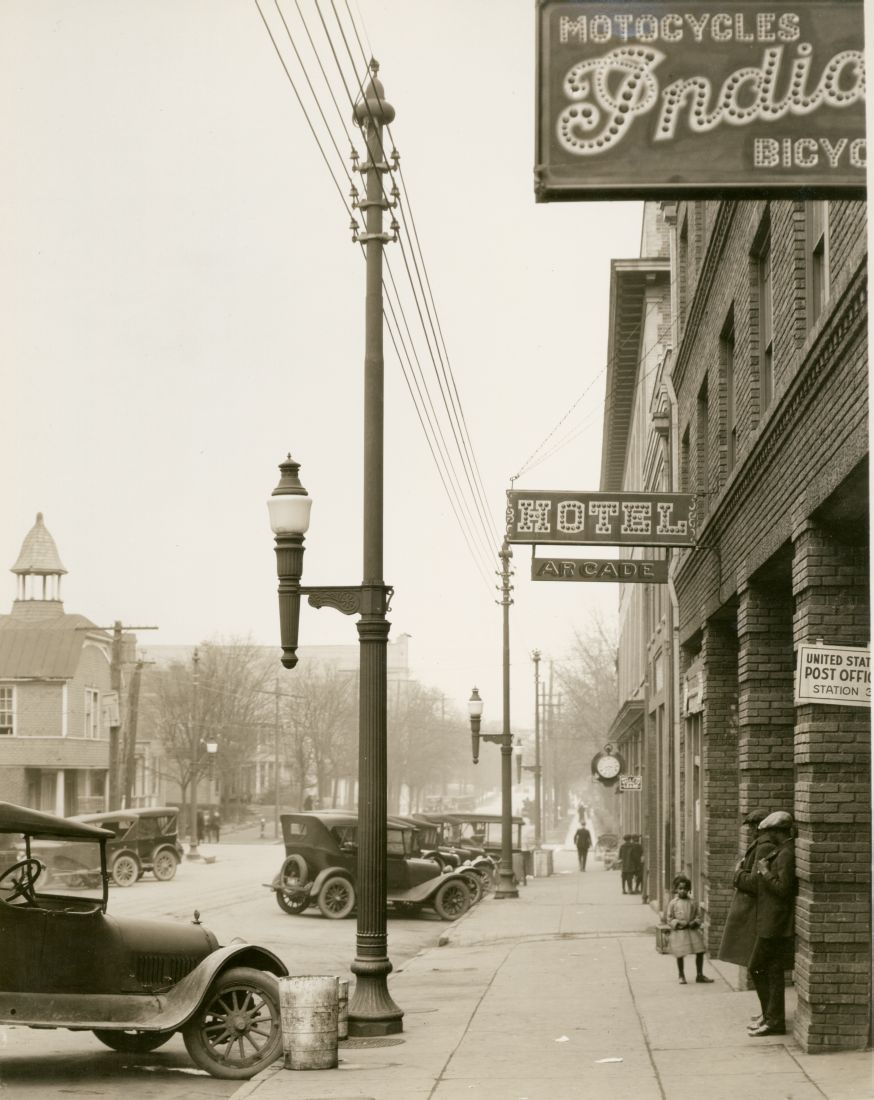
East Hargett Street with the Lightner Arcade on the right, 1926

East Hargett Street was proximate to historically black neighborhoods in east and southeast Raleigh. In the late 19th century, black businesses were scattered across Raleigh and catered to a racially diverse customer base. In 1900, most establishments on East Hargett Street were white-owned, though there were nine black businesses. After about 1902, black establishments migrated off of Fayetteville Street. As Jim Crow racial segregation grew more entrenched, black-owned businesses began to concentrate along Wilmington Street. In 1904 black businessman James Hamlin and Walter T. Harris opened People's Drug Store on East Hargett Street. People's Drug Store was renamed Hamlin Drug three years later. The pharmacy filled prescriptions issued by black physicians and maintained a soda fountain which was popular with local students. It also maintained a lunch counter.

In the late 1900s Calvin E. Lightner, a black architect and mortician, sought to establish a funeral business and office. He originally looked for space along Fayetteville Street, but when this proved unworkable he sought property on East Hargett Street. In 1909 he erected the Lightner Building there. In 1911 he received a state charter to set up a funeral business and founded the Lightner Funeral Home on October 1, operating it out of the first floor of the Lightner Building.

"Every Negro who wanted to into business in Raleigh wanted to be on East Hargett Street because we had built it up. Everybody who came to Raleigh felt he hadn't been to the city until he had been to East Hargett Street."

— Calvin E. Lightner on the importance of East Hargett Street to the black community

Lightner subsequently oversaw the construction of many businesses along East Hargett Street, and thus sparked a shift in the concentration of Raleigh's black-owned businesses from Wilmington Street to East Hargett, which became known as the city's "Black Main Street" or "Negro Main Street". Real estate acquisition by black merchant Berry O'Kelly also enabled growth. Black businessmen and professionals were drawn to the thoroughfare by both being attracted to a sense of community and being forced off of Fayetteville Street. Black neighborhoods in east and southeast Raleigh also rapidly expanded during this time. Unlike other black business districts in the United States during this time, East Hargett attracted a mostly middle class clientele and had a reputation of respectability.

In the 1910s Lightner and his brother Ralph, a mechanic, operated an automobile repair garage on the street. In 1921 Lightner built the Lightner Arcade and Hotel across the street from the Lightner Building. The arcade quickly became a center of social activity for Raleigh's black community, and was considered one of the best hotels for black clientele along the East Coast of the United States. During its existence it was one of two hotels in Raleigh that would accept black customers and hosted musicians Cab Calloway, Count Basie, and Duke Ellington. The building also housed a theater (for both movies and vaudeville performances), a restaurant, barbershop, and the offices of The Carolinian, a black twice-weekly newspaper. Hamlin Drug moved into the building before relocating to an adjacent structure. Black civic leader and physician Manassa Thomas Pope maintained offices in the Hamlin building before relocating down the street.

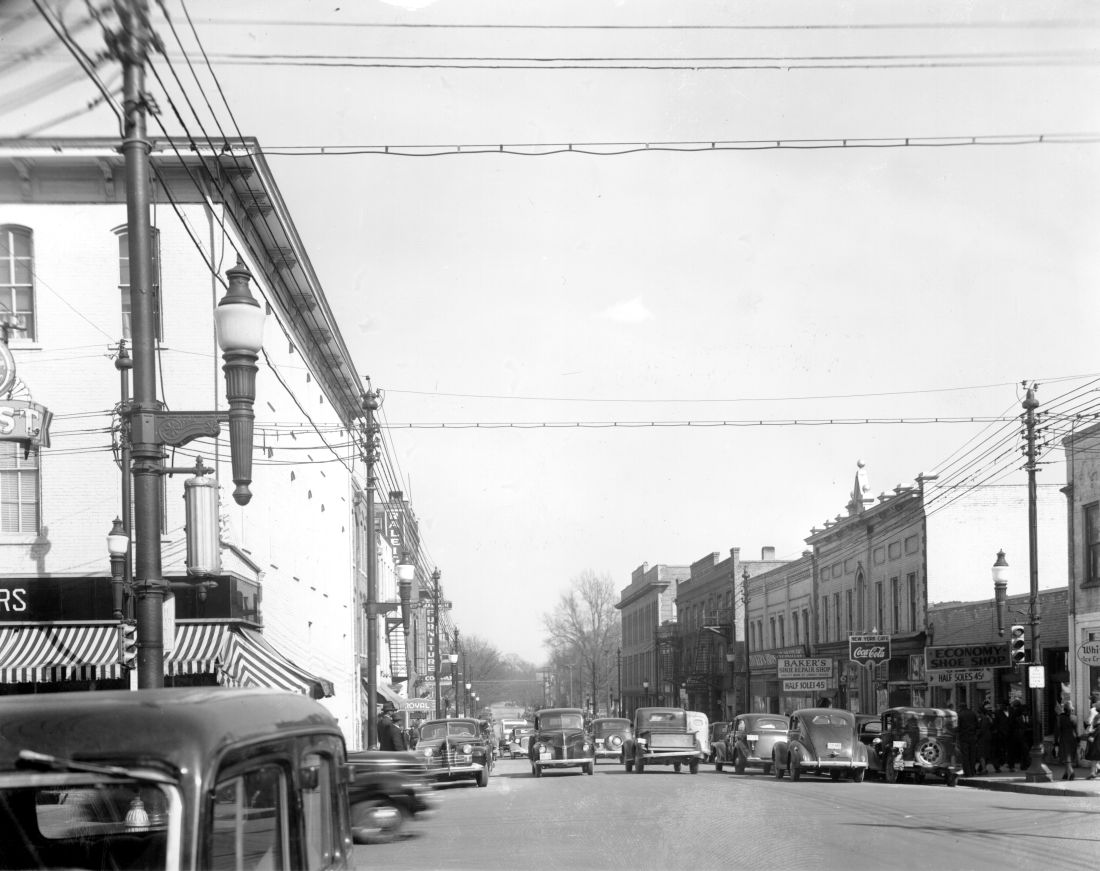
East Hargett Street in the 1940s

Also in 1921, W. T. Jomn opened the Royal Theatre on East Hargett. The following year, Lightner built a Mechanics and Farmers Bank branch building. The branch opened to the public on January 1, 1923, making Mechanics and Farmers one of only 119 banks in the United States at the time—and the only African-American-owned bank—to operate a branch. By that year, black-owned enterprises outnumbered white ones on the street. Most black activity was concentrated along the 100 block. Lightner and his brother sold the Lightner Arcade in May 1925 to the Household of Ruth.

In 1926, physician Lemuel T. Delany arranged for the construction of the Delaney Building and, with dentist George Evans, opened the city's second black dentistry practice. The Great Depression slowed black business development on East Hargett, though the Mechanics and Farmers branch was one of only two banks in Raleigh to not close in wake of the stock market crash. In 1935, Mollie Huston Lee founded the first black public library in Wake County within the Delaney Building. The state Negro Division of Education also maintained offices there. By 1940, East Hargett peaked with 51 black-owned and 27 white-owned businesses. In 1959, 46 black-owned and 23 white-owned businesses remained.

The Hamlin family sold their drug store in 1957 to John M. Johnson and Clarence Coolidge Coleman. They maintained the lunch counter through the 1960s before eventually dropping the service.

=== Decline and rehabilitation ===
"I don't think that time will ever come back, and I don't want it to come back. But I miss the way this street used to be."

— Attorney Fred J. Carnage, 1985

Development on the street slowed after the end of World War II in 1945. In the 1960s, commercial activity moved away from downtown Raleigh, as more people began to shop at new malls and shopping centers and by the middle of the decade East Hargett Street had begun to economically decline. Some black businesses consolidated or fell under corporate ownership, while other merchants moved their operations elsewhere in search of more space. Black consumers, due to improved civil rights, were also able to shop in more places. The Lightner Arcade underwent a series of ownership changes until it burned down in June 1970. The Delaney family sold their building that year to a black physician, who converted the first floor of the structure into a restaurant. By 1982 many of the buildings on East Hargett were vacant and the Royal Theatre had been demolished, though some black businesses remained. In 1985 the Delaney Building was listed as a contributing structure to the Moore Square Historic District.

Modest renovations of East Hargett buildings were undertaken in the 1980s, but restorations steadily increased after 2002. A report issued by the Raleigh municipal government in 2007 assessed that there was "very little commercial development" and few African American businesses along the street, and that the surrounding residential area was beset with crime, drug trafficking, with many properties owned by absentee landlords. Despite this, investors began to take an interest in the street's real estate, as the rest of the downtown area revitalized. Hamlin Drug survived the decline and general departure of independent drug stores from urban areas in North Carolina before it closed in 2017, becoming the last of the historically black businesses from the earlier era to depart. In April 2021, the Raleigh ArtBeats organization and the city government sponsored the painting of murals by T.J. Mundy along the street to commemorate the street and its historical black businesses.

== Works cited ==
- Amis, Moses N. (1902). Historical Raleigh from its foundation in 1792 : descriptive, biographical, educational, industrial, religious; reminiscences reviewed and carefully compiled. Raleigh: Edwards & Broughton. OCLC 3644932.
- Baradaran, Mehrsa (2017). The Color of Money: Black Banks and the Racial Wealth Gap. Harvard University Press. ISBN 9780674970953.
- Benjamin, Karen (2012). "Suburbanizing Jim Crow: The Impact of School Policy on Residential Segregation in Raleigh". Journal of Urban History. 38 (2): 225–246. doi:10.1177/0096144211427114. S2CID 143153851.
- Bunch-Lyons, Beverley. "'Ours is a Business of Loyalty': African American Funeral Home Owners in Southern Cities" (PDF). The Southern Quarterly. 53 (1) (Fall 2015 ed.): 57–71. ISSN 2377-2050.
- Carter, Wilmoth A. (1962). The Urban Negro in the South. New York: Vantage Press. OCLC 42847031.
- Isenberg, Alison (2009). Downtown America: A History of the Place and the People Who Made It. University of Chicago Press. ISBN 9780226385099.
- Kulikowski, Jennifer A.; Peters, Kenneth E. (2002). Historic Raleigh. Charleston: Arcadia Publishing. ISBN 9780738514406.
- Parramore, Thomas C. (1983). Express Lanes & Country Roads: The Way We Lived in North Carolina, 1920-1970. Vol. 5. North Carolina Department of Cultural Resources. ISBN 9780807815533.
- Delaney Building Landmark Report (PDF), Raleigh Historic Properties Commission, 1992
- Regester, Charlene (2005). "From the Buzzard's Roost: Black Movie-Going in Durham and Other North Carolina Cities during the Early Period of American Cinema". Film History. 17 (1): 113–124. doi:10.2979/FIL.2005.17.1.113. JSTOR 3815472. S2CID 194012170.
- Simmons-Henry, Linda, ed. (1990). The Heritage of Blacks in North Carolina. Vol. 1. North Carolina African-American Heritage Foundation. ISBN 9780912081120.
- Suttell, Brian William (2017). Campus to Counter: Civil Rights Activism in Raleigh and Durham, North Carolina, 1960–1963 (PDF) (PhD thesis). University of North Carolina at Greensboro.
- Winford, Brandon K. (2019). John Hervey Wheeler, Black Banking, and the Economic Struggle for Civil Rights. University Press of Kentucky. ISBN 9780813178271.
- Zogry, Kenneth Joel (2008). The house that Dr. Pope built: Race, politics, memory and the early struggle for civil rights in North Carolina (PhD thesis). University of North Carolina at Chapel Hill. doi:10.17615/vp95-m724.
