= James Hamlin =

American military officer and businessman 91859–1294)

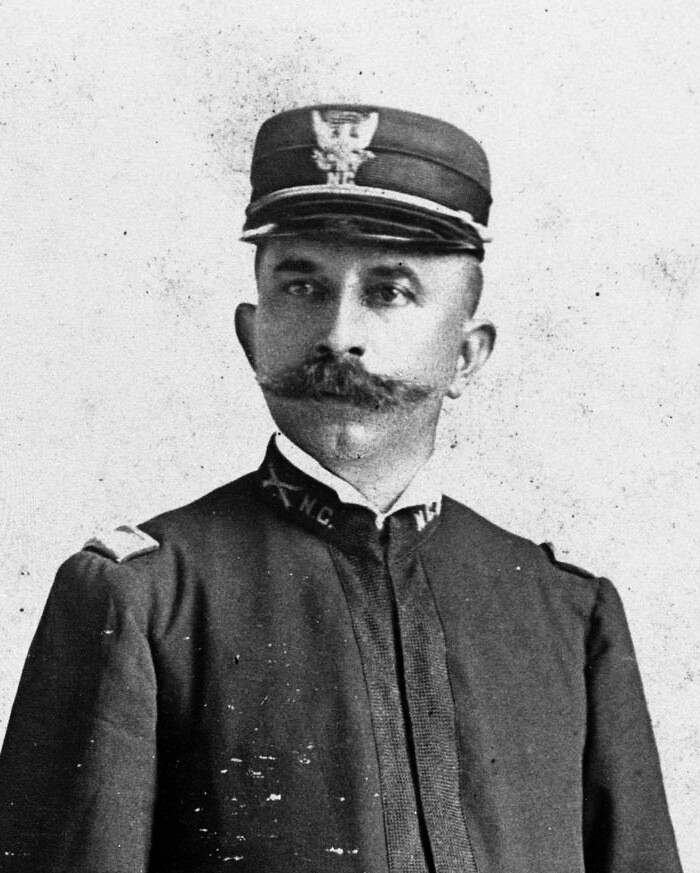
Hamlin in uniform

James Edwards Hamlin (1859 – October 19, 1924) was an American military officer, businessman, and politician. Born in Virginia, he attended Shaw University in Raleigh, North Carolina. He worked some menial jobs before becoming a postal clerk, and eventually opened a saloon. In 1898 Hamlin was mustered into the North Carolina 32nd Volunteers and appointed the rank of captain. He served in the Philippines before returning to North Carolina in 1901. Three years later he cofounded a drug store in Raleigh, which later became known as Hamlin Drug. A member of the Republican Party and proponent of organized labor, he served on the Raleigh Board of Alderman for several years.

== Early life ==
James Hamlin was born in 1859 in Virginia, United States. He earned a degree from Shaw University in Raleigh, North Carolina. He married Annie W. Foushee in 1885 and had two children with her.

== Business and military career ==
Hamlin initially worked in tailoring and pressing before securing a job at a United States Post Office. Upon leaving the position he became a fishmonger. He briefly moved to New York City to work in a dining car before deciding to return to Raleigh to open a saloon. He joined the North Carolina Industrial Association, a black trade association.

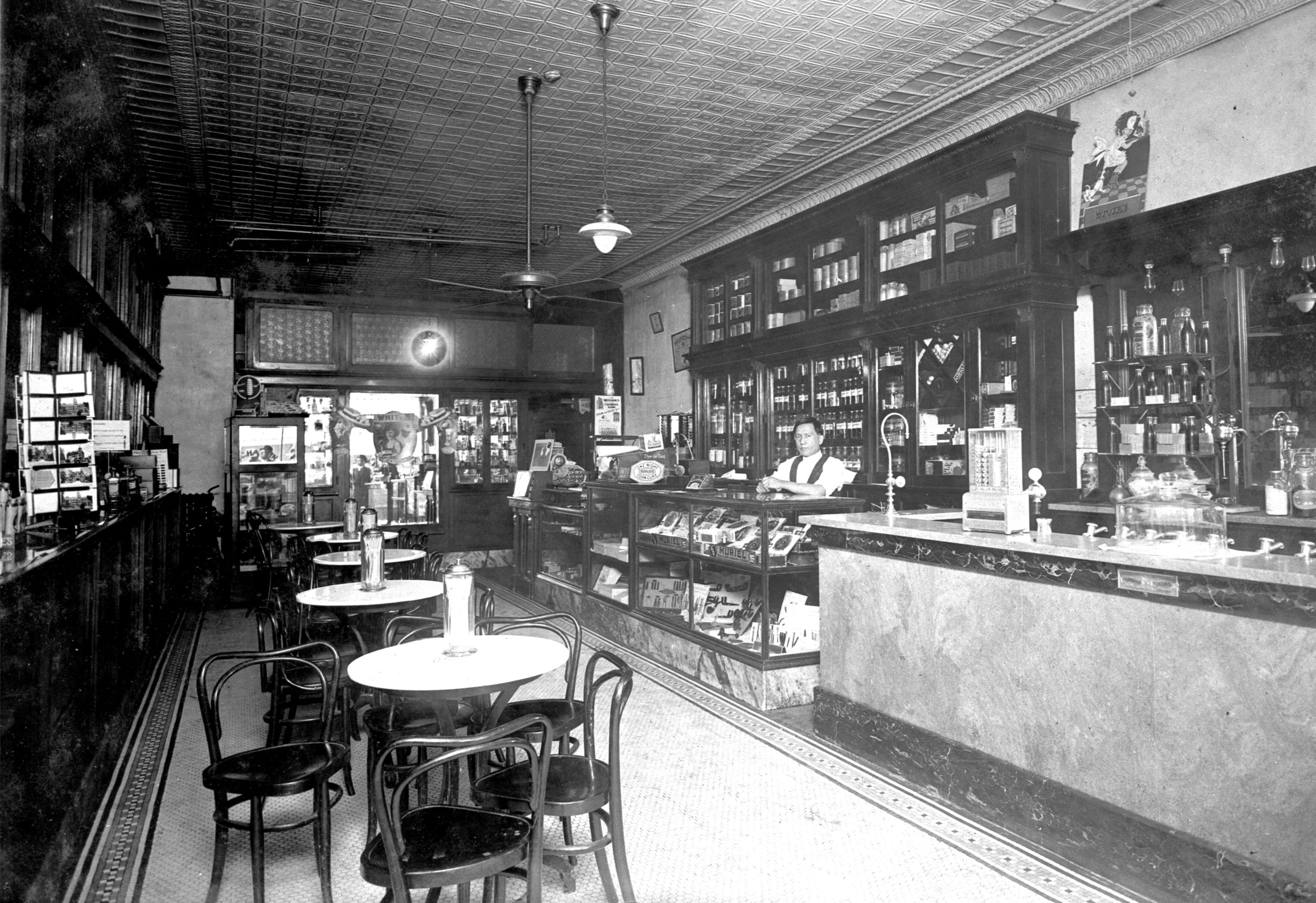
People's Drug Store, c. 1905

In 1898 Hamlin was mustered into Company B of the North Carolina 32nd Volunteers at Fort Macon to serve in the Spanish-American War. Governor of North Carolina Daniel Lindsay Russell accorded him the rank of captain in charge of the company on May 6. He requested leave later that year to attend to his businesses. The war quickly ended, but Hamlin decided to re-enlist. In October 1899, he was sent to Fort Thomas, Kentucky to recruit new soldiers. He then served two years in the Philippines, returning to North Carolina on July 8, 1901 with a Philippine boy he had adopted.

At the start of 1904 a new law came into effect which prohibited the distribution of liquor in Raleigh from any place other than a central dispensary. Hamlin responded by transforming his saloon on Wilmington Street into a restaurant and pool hall. That year Hamlin and Walter T. Harris opened People's Drug Store on East Hargett Street in Raleigh. The pharmacy filled prescriptions issued by black physicians and maintained a soda fountain which was popular with local students. It also maintained a lunch counter. In 1905 he co-founded the Capitol Building and Loan Association, a building society for black people. People's Drug Store was renamed Hamlin Drug two years later. In 1914 Hamlin was fined $1,000 by the Wake County Superior Court for illicitly selling whisky out of his drug store. Two years later Hamlin bought out Harris' share of the business, bringing it under his complete ownership. Hamlin also acquired a second drug store in Raleigh and held stock in a third one in Bluefield. He invested much of his earnings in real estate, having accumulated a farm and 14 houses for renting by 1919.

== Political career ==
Hamlin was a member of the Republican Party. He was hired as a general delivery clerk for the Raleigh post office as a patronage position in the 1880s. An avid supporter of organized labor, he acted as a leading black member of the local Knights of Labor branch, and when he traveled east to conduct business he also encouraged others to form Knights of Labor assemblies. In 1883 Hamlin was elected to the Raleigh Board of Aldermen, representing the 4th Ward. On May 15 the board sat to elect a mayor, but before this was done the Democrats on the board passed a resolution declaring several Republicans ineligible to hold their seats. Hamlin was denied his seat on the grounds that he worked at the post office. In the 1890s he joined with a group of black parents to lobby the public school superintendent to allow for their involvement in their children's education.

By 1899 Hamlin served on the Raleigh Board of Aldermen, representing the 4th Ward. Together with Charles Williams, Hamlin was one of two black men to vacate his position on the board in May 1901, amid the entrenchment of Jim Crow racial segregation in Raleigh. Later that year he became Recorder of Deeds in Washington in a temporary capacity. In 1917, he co-founded the Raleigh chapter of the National Association for the Advancement of Colored People. In 1919 he was the only black person in Raleigh to serve as a notary public.

== Later life ==
Following the intervention of U.S. Senator Lee Slater Overman, in February 1924, Hamlin was allowed to collect a pension of $30 per month for his military service. He died on October 19, 1924, and was buried in Mt. Hope Cemetery. His drug store was inherited by his family, who sold it in 1957. It closed in 2017.

== Works cited ==
- Beckel, Deborah (2010). Radical Reform: Interracial Politics in Post-Emancipation North Carolina. University of Virginia Press. ISBN 9780813930527.
- Rabinowitz, Howard N. (1994). "Race Relations in Southern and Northern Cities". Race, Ethnicity, and Urbanization: Selected Essays. University of Missouri Press. ISBN 9780826209306.
- Richardson, Clement, ed. (1919). The National Cyclopedia of the Colored Race. Vol. 1. Montgomery: National Publishing Company.
- Simmons-Henry, Linda, ed. (1990). The Heritage of Blacks in North Carolina. Vol. 1. North Carolina African-American Heritage Foundation. ISBN 9780912081120.
- Zogry, Kenneth Joel (2008). The house that Dr. Pope built: Race, politics, memory and the early struggle for civil rights in North Carolina (PhD thesis). University of North Carolina at Chapel Hill. doi:10.17615/vp95-m724.
