= Calvin E. Lightner =

American architect, building contractor, and mortician

Calvin E. Lightner c. 1950

Calvin Esau Lightner (March 31, 1878 – May 21, 1960) was an American architect, building contractor, and mortician. He was born in South Carolina and moved to Raleigh, North Carolina, to study architectural design at Shaw University. After graduation he took industrial courses at Hampton Institute and studied embalming in Tennessee. He and his brother established the C. E. Lightner and Brothers construction company and built numerous homes for members of Raleigh's black middle class.

Lightner established the first funeral home for black customers in Raleigh along East Hargett Street. He proceeded to construct numerous commercial buildings along the road, thus sparking a shift in the concentration of Raleigh's black-owned businesses to East Hargett, which became known as the city's "Black Main Street." In 1919 he and two other black men launched a political campaign for municipal offices with the goal of arousing political interest in the black community. Lightner sought the post of Commissioner of Public Works. Jim Crow restrictions prevented most black men from voting and all three lost their elections, though Lightner earned 142 votes. In 1921 he built the Mechanics and Farmers Bank Building in Durham and the Lightner Arcade and Hotel in Raleigh. The latter quickly became a center of social activity for Raleigh's black community and hosted musicians Cab Calloway, Count Basie, and Duke Ellington. Lightner sold his hotel in 1925 and in 1959 turned over his funeral business to his son, Clarence. Lightner died the following year. Clarence was elected as the first black Mayor of Raleigh in 1973. Most of Lightner's building projects no longer exist.

== Early life and education ==
Calvin Lightner was born on March 31, 1878, in Winnsboro, South Carolina, United States, to Frank and Daphney Lightner. His father had been born into slavery and following emancipation farmed and worked as a carpenter, building homes in Chester. His mother had been born as a free person of color. His maternal grandfather, Joseph Thompson, served in the South Carolina General Assembly during Reconstruction. According to census records, Frank was illiterate whereas Daphney could read. Daphney and her children were classified as mulatto in the 1880 United States census.

Lightner attended grade school in Winnsboro before moving to Chester. He briefly worked as a carpenter's apprentice under his father. He moved to Raleigh, North Carolina, in 1898 and enrolled at Shaw University, studying architectural design. He graduated in 1908 with a Bachelor of Science. He furthered his education with industrial courses at Hampton Institute. He married Mamie A. Blackmon, a fellow student at Hampton and a Raleigh home economics teacher on July 7, 1909, in Wake County. They had four children: Calvin, Lawrence, Clarence, and Margaret. In that year he completed embalming school in Nashville, Tennessee.

== Career ==
By 1906, Lightner had established the construction company of C. E. Lightner and Brothers in Raleigh with his brother Rayford. In 1907 he designed and built his own home in Raleigh. Upon graduation from Shaw, he served as an assistant teacher in the university's industrial shop for a year. His construction company proceeded to erect numerous homes for members of the black middle class in the east and southeast portions of the city. He also built at least one home for a white client in Boylan Heights. Various sources state that Lightner did all his own drawings and blueprints for his projects. His company used wooden trusses instead of steel in its buildings.

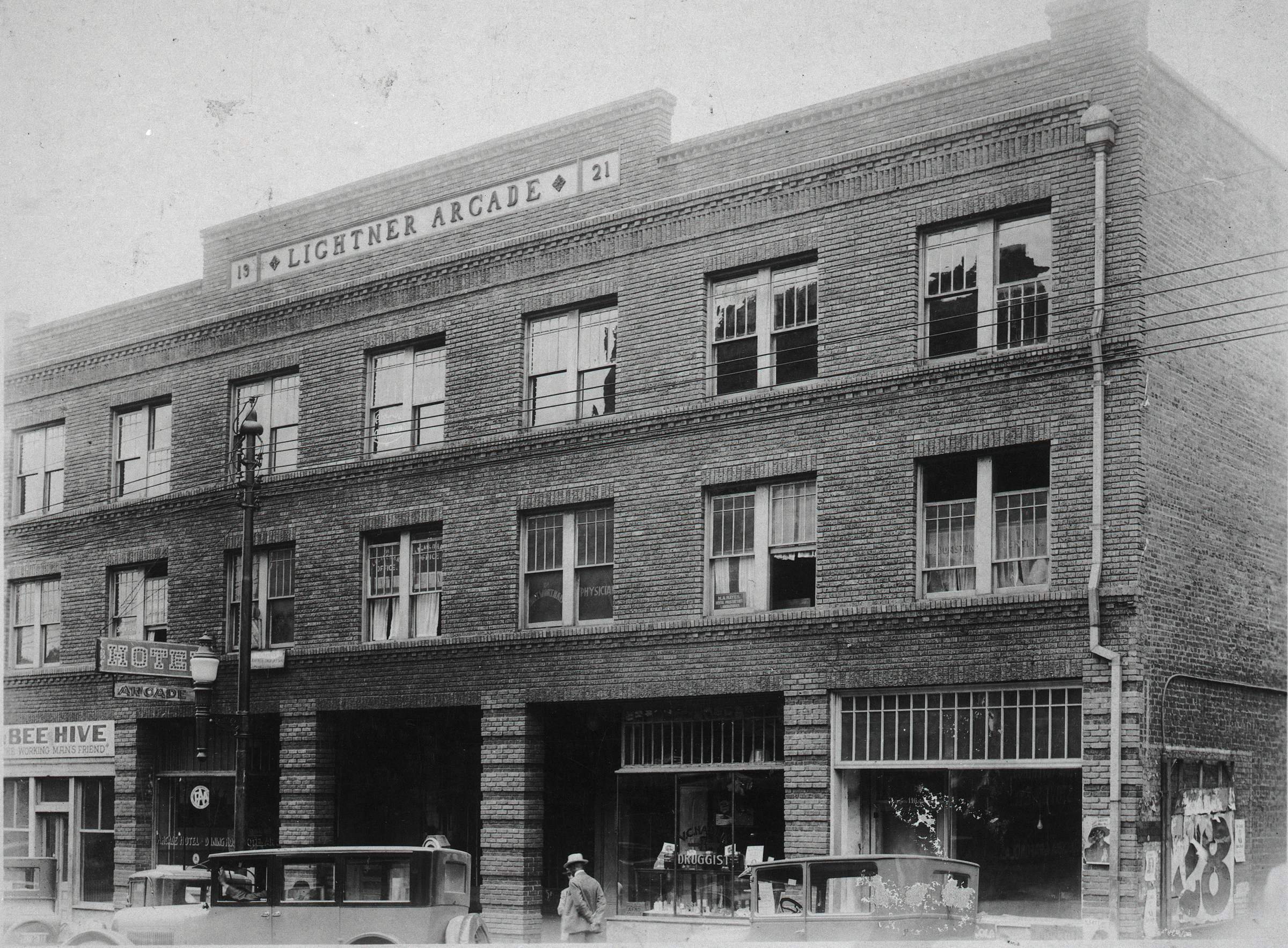
Lightner Arcade and Hotel

Following his graduation from college, Lightner worked as a mortician's apprentice before establishing his own funeral home—the first such business for black people in Raleigh—despite not having an official charter to do so. Lightner originally intended to establish a funeral business and office along Fayetteville Street, but when this proved unworkable he sought property on East Hargett Street. In 1909 he erected the Lightner Building there. In 1911 he received a state charter to set up a funeral business and founded the Lightner Funeral Home on October 1, operating it out of the first floor of the Lightner Building. He subsequently oversaw the construction of many businesses along East Hargett Street, and thus sparked a shift in the concentration of Raleigh's black-owned businesses from Wilmington Street to East Hargett, which became known as the city's "Black Main Street." In the 1910s Lightner and his brother Ralph, a mechanic, operated an automobile repair garage on the street. In 1912 he called for the creation of a North Carolina black undertakers association. During the Colored North Carolina State Fair, a group of undertakers met and formed such an association, electing Lightner its president. In the 1920s he established the private Hillcrest Cemetery for Raleigh's black residents on family property along Garner Road.

Lightner was a member of the National Association for the Advancement of Colored People. In 1919 he and two other black men, Laurence Cheek and Manassa Thomas Pope ran for municipal offices in Raleigh with the endorsement of the Twentieth Century Voters Club, a political organization for people of color. Lightner sought the post of Commissioner of Public Works. Jim Crow restrictions prevented most black men from voting and all three lost their elections. Lightner earned 142 votes, the most of any of the black candidates. Reflecting on the campaign, he said "Even if we had won we knew the whites wouldn't let us administer. But we just wanted to wake our people up politically." The campaign garnered the support of many blacks and provoked the ire of some white leaders, who as a result discouraged other white people from supporting black enterprises in Raleigh. In 1922 he was made a member of a new poverty relief committee, the Negro New Bern Relief Commission.

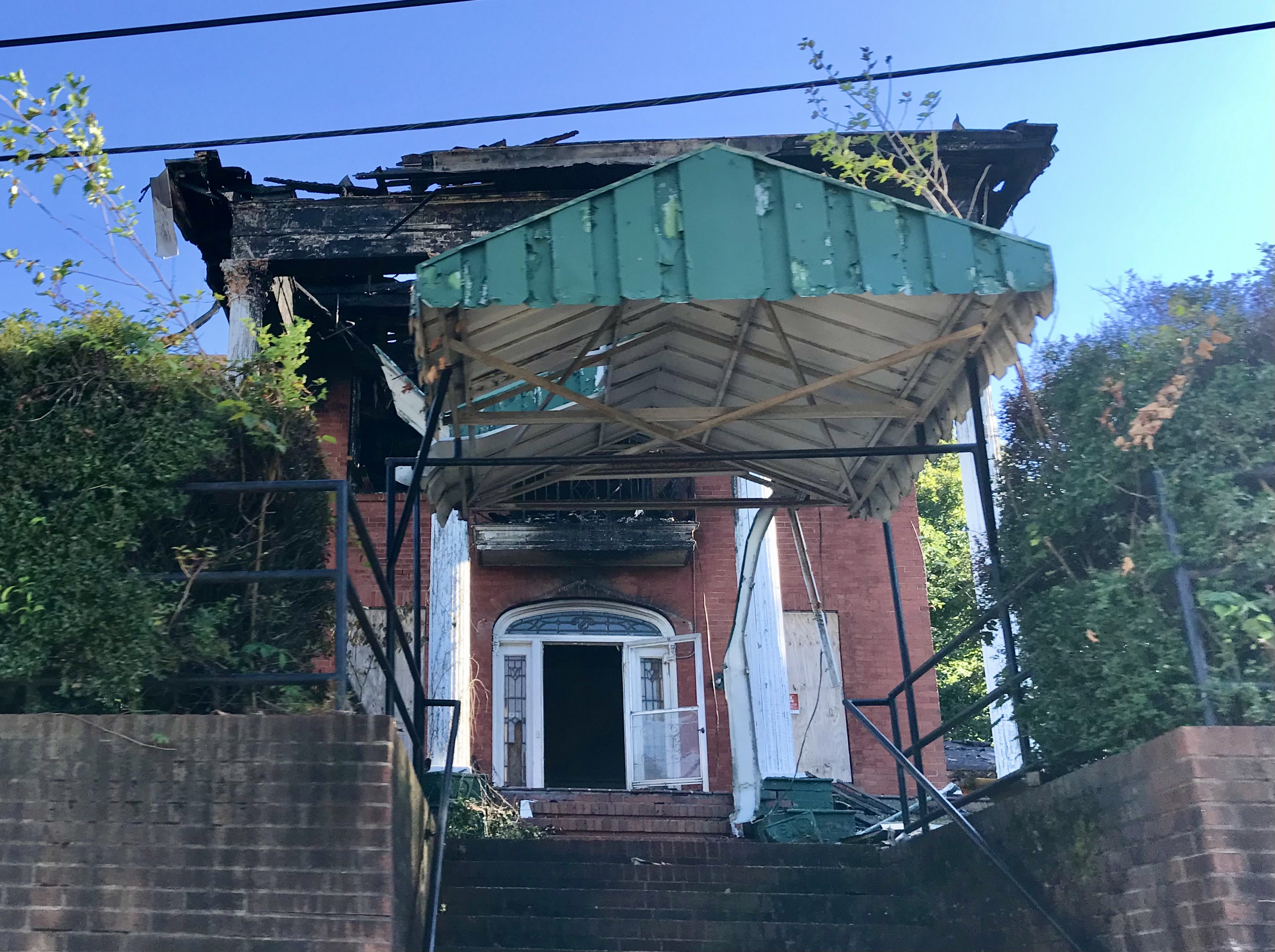
Lightner Funeral Home in Raleigh following 2023 fire

In 1921 Lightner built the Lightner Arcade and Hotel across the street from the Lightner Building, later joking that he decided to erect it after his wife had complained that he hosted too many friends from out of town at their home. The arcade quickly became a center of social activity for Raleigh's black community, and was considered one of the best hotels for black clientele along the East Coast of the United States. During its existence it was one of two hotels in Raleigh that would accept black customers and hosted musicians Cab Calloway, Count Basie, and Duke Ellington. The building also housed a restaurant, drug store, barbershop, and the offices of The Carolinian. Lightner also heavily remodeled Davie Street Presbyterian Church in 1922, where he became a parishioner, and in 1921 constructed the Mechanics and Farmers Bank Building in Durham. The following year he built a Mechanics and Farmers branch building on East Hargett Street in Raleigh. Lightner and his brother sold the hotel in May 1925 to the Household of Ruth for $108,000. In the 1930s he created the Wake County Burial League to sell burial insurance. In 1941 Lightner purchased the Capehart House and moved his funeral home there. He retired the following year. In 1959 he gave control of his funeral home to his son, Clarence.

== Later life and legacy ==
Lightner died on May 21, 1960, at St. Agnes Hospital in Raleigh. A funeral was held for him on May 25 at Davie Street Presbyterian Church, and he was buried in Mt. Hope Cemetery. The Lightner Arcade burned down in 1970. Lightner's son, Clarence, was elected as the first black Mayor of Raleigh in 1973. His family home was demolished in 1990. By 2020, most of Lightner's buildings were no longer extant, with the notable exceptions of Davie Street Presbyterian Church and the Mechanics and Farmers Bank Building in Durham. The Lightner Funeral Home was sold in 2022 and heavily damaged by fire the following year.

== Works cited ==
- Bunch-Lyons, Beverley. "'Ours is a Business of Loyalty': African American Funeral Home Owners in Southern Cities" (PDF). The Southern Quarterly. 53 (1) (Fall 2015 ed.): 57–71. ISSN 2377-2050.
- East Raleigh-South Park Historic District (PDF), National Register of Historic Places, United States Department of the Interior, 1990
- Kulikowski, Jennifer A.; Peters, Kenneth E. (2002). Historic Raleigh. Charleston: Arcadia Publishing. ISBN 9780738514406.
- Zogry, Kenneth Joel (2008). The house that Dr. Pope built: Race, politics, memory and the early struggle for civil rights in North Carolina (PhD thesis). University of North Carolina at Chapel Hill. doi:10.17615/vp95-m724.
