= Mount Hope Cemetery (Raleigh, North Carolina) =

Historic cemetery in North Carolina, US

- U.S. National Register of Historic Places
- U.S. Historic district
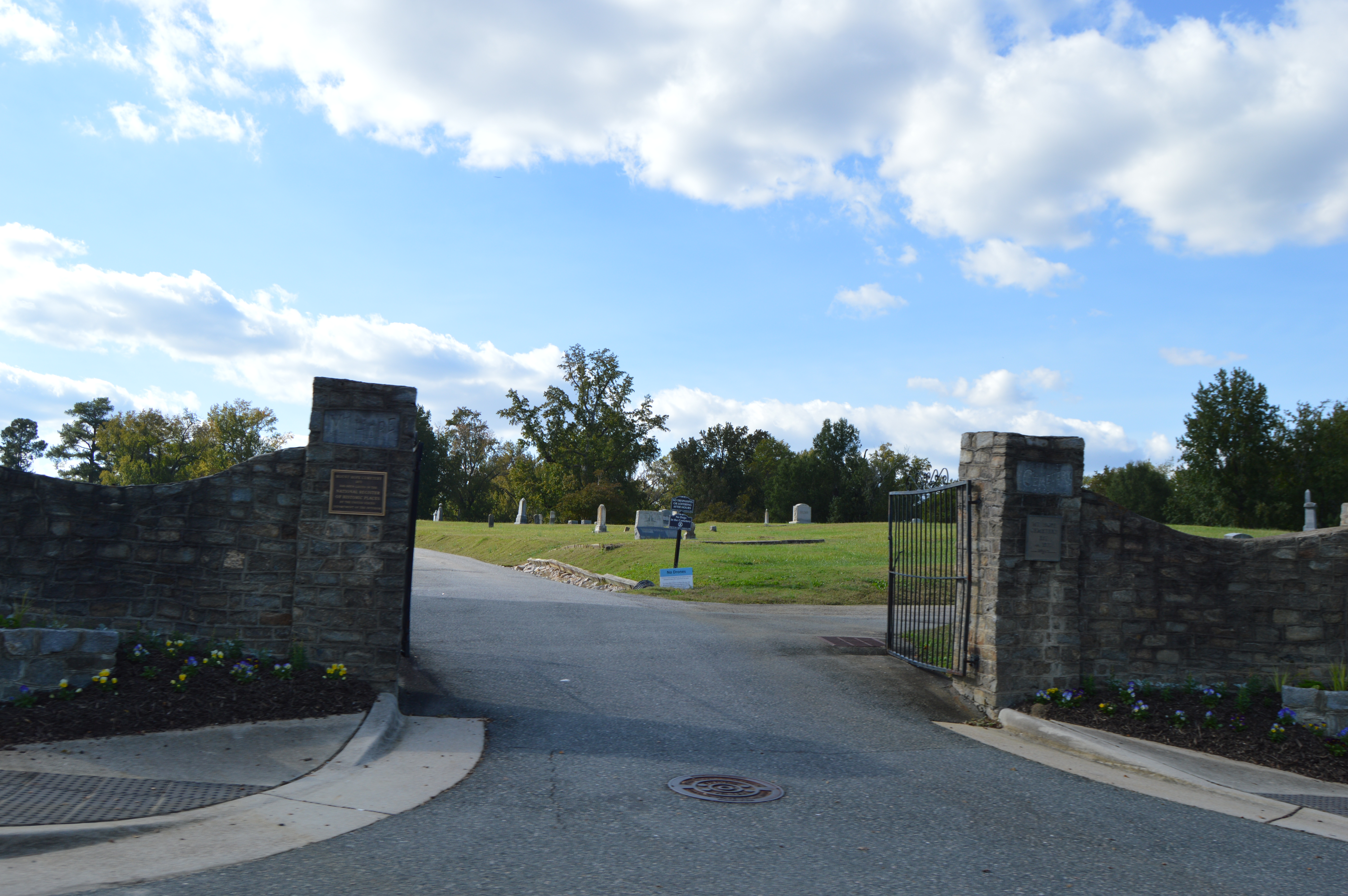
- Entrance

- Location within North Carolina Location within the United States
- Location: 1100 Fayetteville St., Raleigh, North Carolina
- Coordinates: 35.7647°N 78.6454°W
- Area: 29.3 acres (11.9 ha)
- Built: c. 1872
- Architect: C.A. Goodwin; et al.
- NRHP reference No.: 08001292
- Added to NRHP: January 8, 2009

Mount Hope Cemetery is a historic African-American cemetery and national historic district located at Raleigh, North Carolina. It was established about 1872. The approximate total number of monuments in the cemetery is 1,454, although interment records list over 7,000 individuals. Notable contributing resources include the W. H. Matthews (1828–1902) mausoleum, the front entrance gates and gate posts (c. 1930s), and the garden cemetery landscape design. Notable people buried include Gaston Alonzo Edwards.

It was listed on the National Register of Historic Places in 2009.

== History ==
The cemetery was established in 1872 after the city of Raleigh purchased approximately 11 acres to serve as burial grounds for blacks after the black section of City Cemetery was deemed full.

== Notable burials ==
- Henry Beard Delany (1858–1928), Episcopal bishop
- James Hamlin (1859–1924), businessman
- John Walcott Kay (1890–1927), physician and hospital founder
- Willie Otey Kay (1894–1992), dress maker
- Calvin E. Lightner (1878–1960), mortician
- Evelyn Pope (1908–1995), librarian
- Manassa Thomas Pope (1858–1935), physician
