= J.T. Williams Secondary Montessori =

Public magnet school in Charlotte, North Carolina

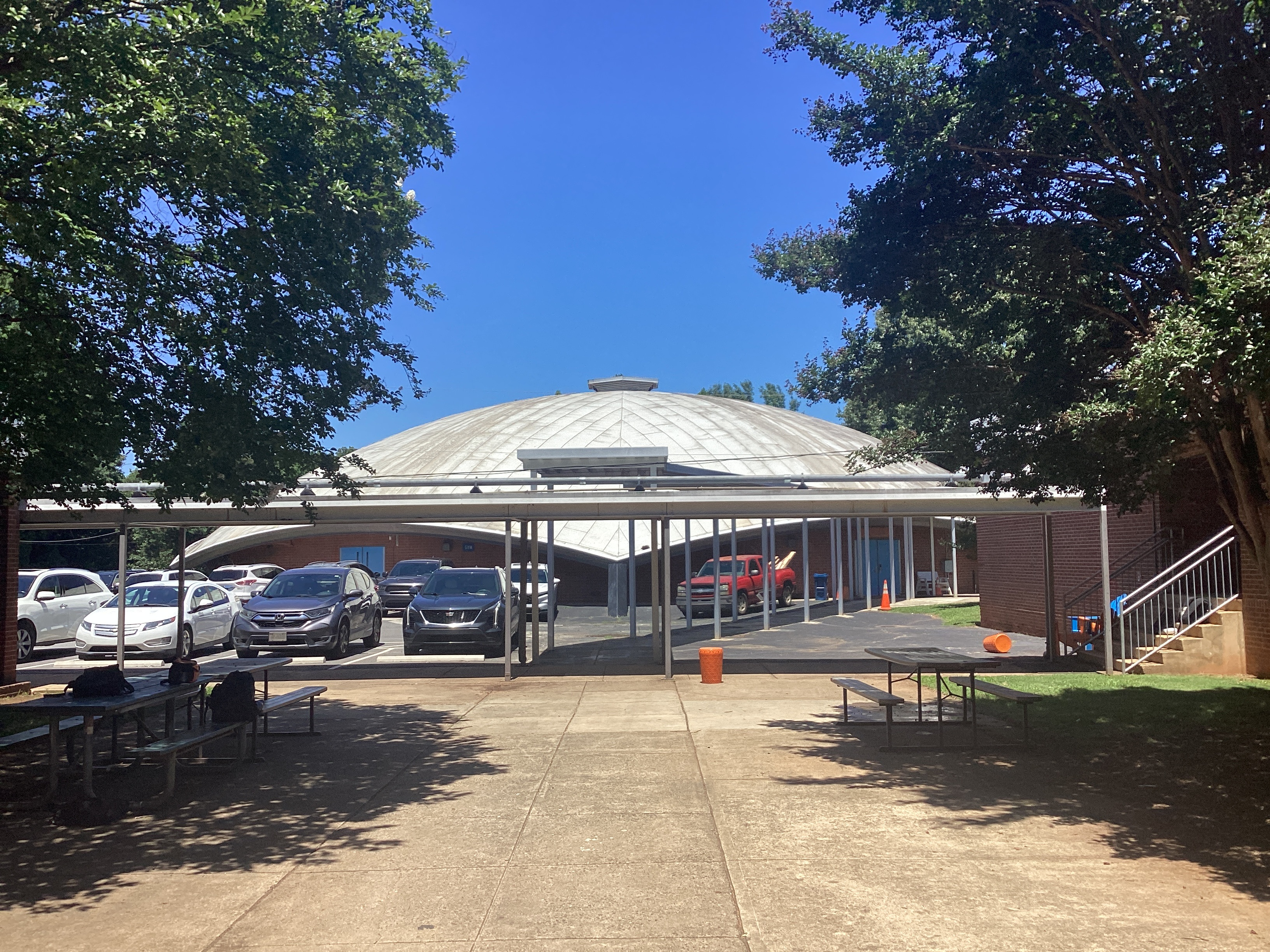
- The gym at this school is the shape of a dome.

Location
- 3351 Griffith Street; Charlotte, North Carolina 28206; United States; 35.26725°N 80.84156°W

Information
- Type: public magnet
- Established: c.2017
- Status: Active
- School district: Charlotte-Mecklenburg Schools
- Principal: Melanie Francis
- Staff: around 34
- Grades: 7-12
- Enrollment: 362 (2023-2024)
- Team name: Trailblazers
- National ranking: 1075
- Feeder schools: Chantilly Montessori, Lincoln Heights Montessori, Highland Milll Montessori, Sedgefeild Montessori
- Website: jtwilliamsms.cmsk12.org
- Last updated: June-1 2026

J.T. Williams Secondary Montessori is a public magnet school in Charlotte, North Carolina, serving students in grades 7 through 12. Part of the Charlotte-Mecklenburg Schools (CMS) district, it is the first program in the region to offer a continuous Montessori curriculum through the high school level. The school is named in honor of Dr. John Taylor Williams, a 19th-century physician, educator, and diplomat who was a prominent figure in Charlotte's African American history.

== History ==
=== Namesake ===
The school commemorates Dr. John Taylor Williams (1859–1924), one of the first three Black physicians licensed to practice medicine in North Carolina. Born in Cumberland County to free Black parents, Williams graduated at the top of his class from the State Normal School (now Fayetteville State University) in 1880 before earning his medical degree from Leonard Medical School in 1886. He served as a Charlotte City Alderman and was appointed by President William McKinley as the U.S. Consul to Sierra Leone, serving from 1898 to 1907.

=== Facility and transition ===
The current facility at 2400 Carmine Street previously operated the J.T. Williams Middle School. In 2017, CMS repurposed the site to house the district's expanding Montessori program, specifically to accommodate the secondary level (grades 7–12).

In 2024, the Charlotte-Mecklenburg Board of Education approved a plan to relocate the J.T. Williams Secondary Montessori program to the former Marie G. Davis campus at 3351 Griffith Street. This move was scheduled for the 2026–2027 school year following bond-funded renovations to the Davis facility. Currently it is located at 3351 Griffith Street 582, Charlotte, NC, 28203.

== Academics ==
The school follows the Montessori philosophy, which emphasizes student-led inquiry, independent work, and community responsibility. It serves as the "terminal" site for students who began their Montessori education at CMS elementary "feeder schools" such as Chantilly, Park Road, or Highland Mill.

=== Erdkinder philosophy ===
The secondary program is guided by Maria Montessori's "Children of the Land" (Erdkinder) principles, tailored for the developmental needs of adolescents. This model emphasizes practical life skills, community-based "field studies," and social responsibility alongside rigorous traditional academics such as Advanced Placement (AP) courses. For the 2023–2024 academic year, the school reported a math proficiency rate of 72% and a reading proficiency rate of 89%. The school has a greenhouse, chicken coop, pig pen, and goat pen for its Sustainable Agriculture and Animal Science programs.

== Admissions ==
As a magnet school, admission is primarily administered through the CMS School Choice Lottery. While the program is designed for students continuing from Montessori elementary schools, a "Late Entry" process is available for students in grades 7 through 10 who are new to the Montessori method, provided they satisfy specific admissions criteria.

== Position in the national landscape ==
While there are over 500 public Montessori schools in the United States, the vast majority serve only primary and elementary grades. J.T. Williams is one of a small number of public institutions nationwide (estimated at fewer than 50) that offer a complete Montessori curriculum for high school students. It is modeled after pioneering programs such as Clark Montessori High School in Cincinnati, Ohio.
