= Fred J. Carnage =

American attorney

Fred Jonathan Carnage (April 16, 1894 – March 5, 1988) was an American attorney.

== Early life ==
Fred Jonathan Carnage was born in Thomasville, Georgia, United States on April 16, 1894 to Caroline and Calvin Carnage. His father was a railway worker and his grandfather was enslaved. He received his primary and secondary education at the Allen Normal School in Thomasville. He attended Morgan State College in Baltimore, graduating in 1923, before studying law at Howard University in Washington D. C. He graduated with a Bachelor of Laws in 1926. He moved to Raleigh, North Carolina the following year and was hired as an agent by the North Carolina Mutual Life Insurance Company, eventually becoming an assistant manager. He married Mary E. Coleman on December 18, 1932 in Virginia. They had one daughter together.

== Career ==
=== Legal career ===
In 1932 Carnage passed the North Carolina bar examination and established a law practice in the Love Drug Store building in Raleigh, thus becoming the second black lawyer in the city. Later that year he moved his offices to East Hargett Street, where they remained for the rest of his career. Early on in his career the primarily black residents of the Lincoln Park and College Park neighborhoods in Raleigh were aggrieved that they were taxed the same rate as other city residents but did not receive sewage and water services. The residents signed a petition and Carnage lobbied before the North Carolina General Assembly to build the requisite facilities. The issue resolved when the municipal government agreed to lay water and sewage infrastructure in the area.

In the 1932 Carnage helped established a Negro Voters League, which successfully registered 1,500 black people to vote. The Wake County Board of Elections struck the names from its registration roles, and Carnage and another attorney sued for them to be restored before the North Carolina Supreme Court. This was done after some tests were administered to the prospective voters. In 1946 he secured the conviction of white grocer for assaulting a black woman whom he represented. Carnage was opposed to racial segregation in businesses, and once told a judge that he believed if an establishment advertised itself as open to the public, it could not claim to discriminate against customers on the grounds that it operated on private property. In 1961 he served as a defense council for three Shaw University students who had been arrested during a sit-in. On February 6, 1962 he was the first black person appointed to the North Carolina Advisory Committee to the Chief of Protocol.

=== School board and civic activities ===
As a member of the Negro Citizens Committee, Carnage and two others spoke before a committee of the General Assembly to secure land for the creation of a public black park in Raleigh. This succeeded, and John Chavis Memorial Park was opened in 1938. During World War II he created a United Service Organizations chapter to entertain black soldiers in Raleigh. In 1947 Raleigh abolished its city commission government in favor of a new council–manager system. Carnage and another black man launched unsuccessful candidacies for seats on the new Raleigh City Council, though Carnage obtained 1,920 votes.

On February 15, 1949, Carnage was appointed to a seat on the Raleigh Board of Education by the Raleigh City Council, thus becoming the first black person to serve on the body and the second black person to serve on a local school board in North Carolina. At the time, one third of Raleigh's public school students were black, and the appointment was made to give them representation. He participated in the groundbreaking ceremony for John W. Ligon Junior-Senior High School in November 1951. The United States Supreme Court later ruled that racial segregation in public schools was unconstitutional, and in February 1956 he became the first Raleigh school board member to voice support for the decision, saying, "Children should have a better understanding of each other. The American Negro has suffered under the current setup." When asked about black people's goals vis a vis integration efforts, Carnage said he thought blacks were primarily concerned with equal economic opportunity and did not support "forced integration". Raleigh's public schools began integrating in 1960, and the following year he was the only board member to vote in favor of a petition to allow a black student to be admitted to Broughton High School. He explained his decision to the board, saying, "The sooner a few Negro children enter these schools and the public finds they are just like other children, the sooner the whole thing will be settled." Carnage left the school board in 1962. The board unanimously named a junior high school after him in September 1965. In his later life he would visit the school annually as a guest speaker.

== Later life ==
Carnage continued to practice law until he died on March 5, 1988.

== Works cited ==
- Simmons-Henry, Linda, ed. (1990). The Heritage of Blacks in North Carolina. Vol. 1. North Carolina African-American Heritage Foundation. ISBN 9780912081120.
