= Paulette Dillard =

American academic administrator and medical technologist

18th President of Shaw University
- Incumbent
- Assumed office 2017
- Preceded by: Tashni-Ann Dubroy

Personal details
- Education: Barber–Scotia College; Belmont University; Tennessee State University; Clark Atlanta University
- Profession: College administrator

Paulette R. Dillard is an American academic administrator and medical technologist. She is the 18th president of Shaw University.

== Early life and education ==
Dillard is from Mount Airy, North Carolina. She graduated from Barber–Scotia College and completed a M.B.A. at Belmont University. Dillard earned a M.S. in biology at Tennessee State University. She completed a Ph.D. in cell biology at Clark Atlanta University.

== Career ==
Dillard began her career at International Clinical Laboratories in Nashville, Tennessee. She was a scientist for 25 years in the field of diagnostic laboratory medicine. She is a medical technologist certified by the American Society for Clinical Pathology. She held leadership positions at GlaxoSmithKline, Quest Diagnostics, and the Center for Cancer Research and Therapeutic Development at Clark Atlanta University. Dillard served as vice president for academic affairs and dean of the college of arts and sciences at Shaw University.In July 2025, she became chair of the Central Intercollegiate Athletic Association (CIAA) Board of Directors. The term will be two years long, ending in 2027. Dillard was also co-director of Shaw's enrichment programs for the National Institute on Minority Health and Health Disparities Research Infrastructure in Minority Institutions project. She became interim president in July 2017. On September 8, 2018, she succeeded Tashni-Ann Dubroy as the 18th president of Shaw University. In this role, she stands as a staunch advocate for her students and staff; in October 2022 Dillard publicly criticized the Spartanburg County, South Carolina police department after 18 students and 2 staff were unjustly stopped and searched at a traffic stop. In addition to her presidential duties at Shaw, Dr. Dillard is a member of various extracurricular associations, such as the Carolina Small Business Development Fund (CSBDF) and the Dorothea Dix Conversancy. Dr. Dillard serves on the boards for the Carolina Small Business Development Fund and the Dorothea Dix Conservancy.

== See also ==
- List of women presidents or chancellors of co-ed colleges and universities
