= Pocahontas Pope =

Pocahontas Kay
- Born: 1864; Halifax County, North Carolina, US
- Died: November 11, 1938 (aged 73–74); Washington, D.C., US
- Resting place: National Harmony Memorial Park Cemetery
- Spouse: John Pope
- Parents: John Kay (father); Mary Cha (mother)

Pocahontas Pope (1864–1938) was the first African American Baha'i convert to reside in Washington, D.C.

== Early life ==
Pocahontas was born in 1864 the daughter of John Kay and Mary Cha. Her parents married on January 11, 1861. She had three full-siblings: Willey "Billy", Roxanor, and Alexander Cha Kay. After John's death Mary remarried to Landy Grizzard on November 11, 1876. Pocahontas took her step-father's surname and she gained five step siblings Lindbel, Casy, Lessia, Ellick, and Mary Grizzard.

== Marriage and career ==
Pocahontas married Rev. John Pope on December 26, 1883. John and Pocahontas worked as teachers in various schools aimed at educating black youth and spreading their strong Baptist faith to the community.

The couple moved to Washington, D.C., in the summer of 1898. In 1906 Pocahontas was hired by Alma Knobloch (1864–1943) to do housework for her. There she met Alma's sister Pauline Hannen (1874-1939) who introduced her to the Baha'i faith. Pocahontas was revered in the Baha'i community in Washington and held private meetings with African-American leaders including Alain LeRoy Locke, Coralie Franklin Cook, and Harriet Gibbs Marshall. ‘Abdu’l-Bahá wrote praising her activism in Washington:

Render thanks to the Lord that among that race thou art the first believer, that thou hast engaged in spreading sweet-scented breezes, and hast arisen to guide others. … Although the pupil of the eye is black, it is the source of light. Thou shalt likewise be. The disposition should be bright, not the appearance. Therefore, with supreme confidence and certitude, say:

“O God!

Make me a radiant light, a shining lamp, and a brilliant star,

so that I may illumine the hearts with an effulgent ray from

Thy Kingdom of ‘Abhá.

== Later life and death ==
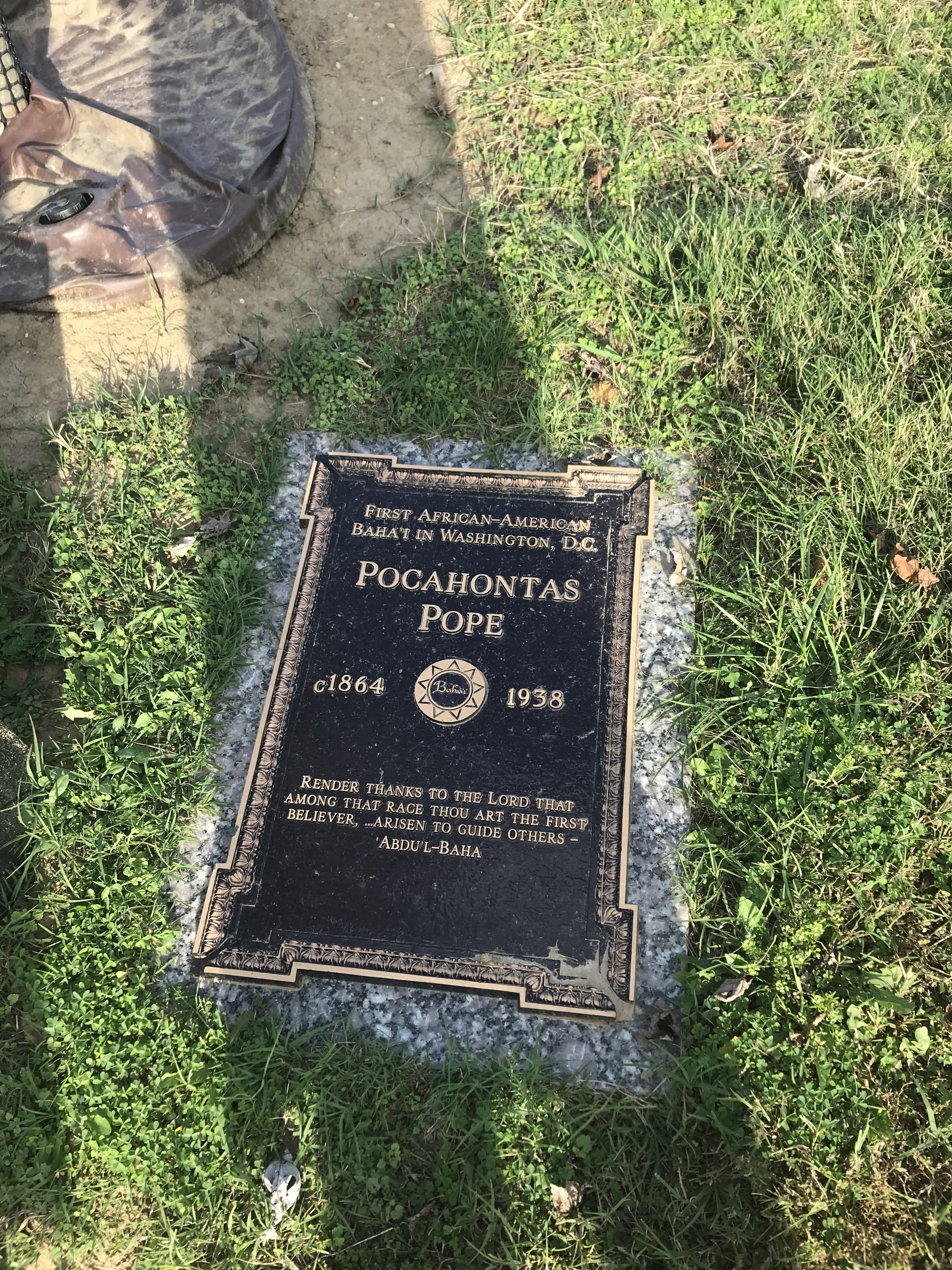
Pocahontas Pope marker

John Pope died on March 30, 1918. The couple had no children together and Pocahontas never remarried. Pocahontas would later reside at 1500 1st St NW from 1920 to 1930; during this time she worked as a seamstress and lived with lodgers. For the last two years of her life she was a patient in Saint Elizabeth's Hospital. Pocahontas died on November 11, 1938. Pocahontas's exact burial place might be unknown since many African-American cemeteries had their headstones taken away and were used along the Potomac River to prevent erosion. Her grave site in Maryland was discovered unmarked in 2017 and Baha’is raised money for a plaque which was placed on her grave in 2018.
