= Manassa Thomas Pope =

American physician and businessman (1858–1934)

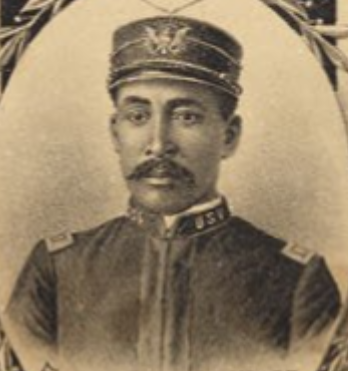
- Pope as a military surgeon in 1899

Personal details
- Born: 1858 Rich Square, North Carolina, U.S.
- Died: November 13, 1934 (aged 75–76) Raleigh, North Carolina, U.S.
- Resting place: Mount Hope Cemetery
- Spouses: Lydia Walden; Delia H. Phillips
- Children: 2 (including Evelyn Pope)
- Parents: Jonas Elias Pope; Permelia Phoebe Hall
- Relatives: Pocahontas Pope
- Education: Shaw University; Leonard Medical School
- Occupation: Physician; businessman

Military service
- Allegiance: United States
- Branch/service: United States Army
- Rank: first lieutenant
- Battles/wars: Spanish–American War

Manassa Thomas Pope (1858 – November 13, 1934) was an American physician, businessman, and politician. He was a prominent member of the African-American middle class in Raleigh, North Carolina and ran for mayor in 1919, at the height of the Jim Crow era. He owned a medical practice in Raleigh and was involved in the establishment of Queen City Drug Company in Charlotte, North Carolina and Mechanics and Farmers Bank in Durham, North Carolina.

== Early life, family, and education ==
Pope was born in Rich Square, North Carolina in 1858. He was of mixed-race ancestry through both of his parents. His father, Jonas Elias Pope (1827–1913), was a Quaker carpenter and landowner in Northampton County and Bertie County who rented some of his property to sharecroppers to grow cotton. Pope's mother, Permelia Phoebe Hall (1829–1889), was an educated woman of free birth who ran the house and excelled at needle work. They employed a farm hand, George Manly, and a maid, Mary Manly. Pope was a relative of Pocahontas Pope and Cleero Pope.

He graduated from Shaw University in Raleigh, North Carolina and earned a medical degree from Leonard Medical Center in 1886. He was a classmate and friend of James H. Young whose regiment he later served in during the Spanish-American War.

== Career and family life ==
Pope married Lydia Walden, of Winton, North Carolina, in 1887. They moved to Henderson in 1888. Pope served there as assistant postmaster, a position acquired by political appointment. He also worked in Charlotte, where he co-founded Queen City Drug Company in 1892. He also co-founded the People's Benevolent Association, an insurance business.

In 1898, he served as a first lieutenant and first assistant surgeon during the Spanish American War.

His home in Raleigh is listed on the National Register of Historic Places. He was a candidate for mayor of Raleigh in 1919 during the Jim Crow era.

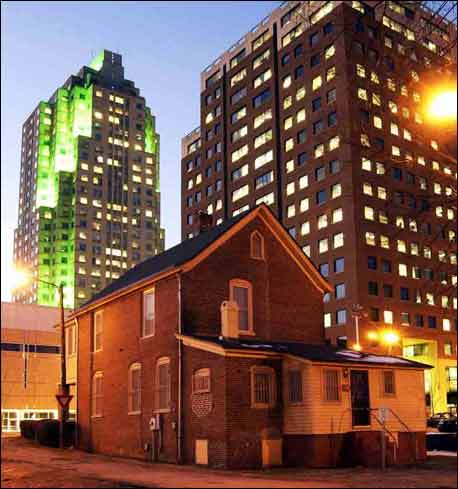
Pope House in 2008

Pope moved to Raleigh in 1899, establishing his medical practice on Fayetteville Street and later at 13 East Hargett Street. He built his two-story brick home at 511 South Wilmington Street in 1901. The last remaining home from a once segregated neighborhood of middle class African Americans, it is now the M. T. Pope House Museum.

His wife died in 1906 and he married a second time to Delia Haywood Phillips, an educator, the following year. They had two daughters: Evelyn and Ruth who graduated from Columbia University and became teachers.

Pope helped organize Mechanics and Farmers Bank in Durham, North Carolina.

Facing abuse and discrimination from a rising tide of restrictions from an organized movement for white supremacy, he ran for mayor of Raleigh in 1919.
