= Evelyn Pope =

American librarian

- Born: August 17, 1908; Raleigh, North Carolina, U.S.
- Died: September 14, 1995 (aged 87); Raleigh, North Carolina, U.S.
- Resting place: Mount Hope Cemetery
- Education: Shaw University (BA); Hampton University (BLS); Columbia University (MLS)
- Occupation: librarian
- Parent(s): Manassa Thomas Pope (father); Delia H. Phillips (mother)

Evelyn Bennett Pope (August 17, 1908 – September 14, 1995) was an American librarian. She worked as a law librarian at the North Carolina Central University School of Law before serving as Dean of Library Sciences at the university.

== Early life, family, and education ==
Pope was born in 1908 in Raleigh, North Carolina to Manassa Thomas Pope, a doctor and businessman who was the first Black man to receive a medical license in North Carolina, and Delia Haywood Phillips, an educator and representative for a company owned by Madam C. J. Walker. Pope's mother was the sister of Mary E. Phillips, an educator for whom Mary E. Phillips High School was named, and a cousin of educator and activist Anna Julia Cooper. Her maternal grandparents were formerly enslaved at the Haywood plantation and later became prominent members of Raleigh's black society. She was a great-great-granddaughter of the planter and enslaver John Haywood, who served as North Carolina State Treasurer and as the Raleigh's Intendant of Police.

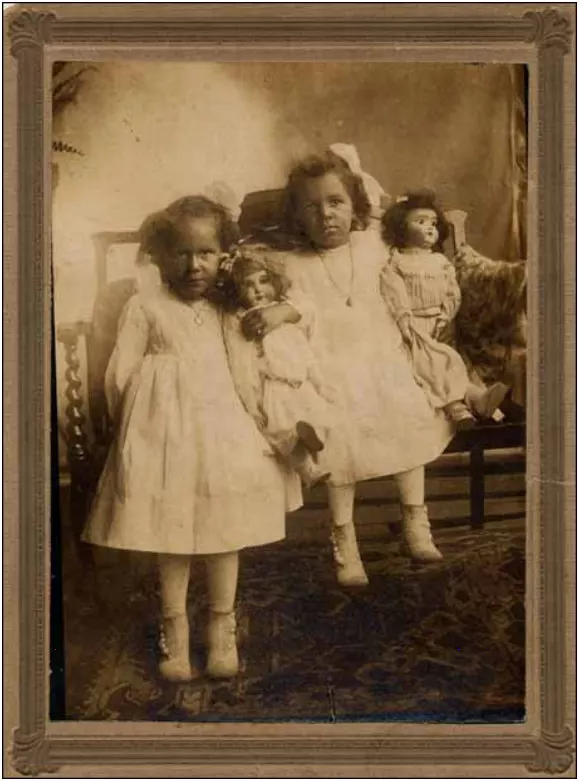
Ruth and Evelyn Pope circa 1913

Pope and her younger sister, Ruth, grew up at 511 S Wilmington Street, a large brick house in the Fourth Ward neighborhood that their father built in 1901. The Popes were a wealthy family that were leaders within the city's African-American middle class. In 1919, her father unsuccessfully ran for Mayor of Raleigh, although he did secure the majority of the Black residents' votes. The family were strict adherents to the Baptist faith.

She graduated with a bachelor of arts degree from Shaw University, where she was a charter member of the Omicron Zeta Chapter of Zeta Phi Beta, and a bachelor of library science degree at Hampton University. She earned a master's degree in library science from Columbia University.

== Career ==
Pope began her career working as a schoolteacher. She transitioned from teaching into library science, taking a job as a law librarian at the North Carolina Central University School of Law. She later became a professor at North Carolina Central University and was promoted to Dean of Library Sciences in the 1960s.

== Personal life ==
In her later years, Pope returned to her childhood home and died there in 1995.
