= Roger Demosthenes O'Kelly =

American lawyer (1880–1962)

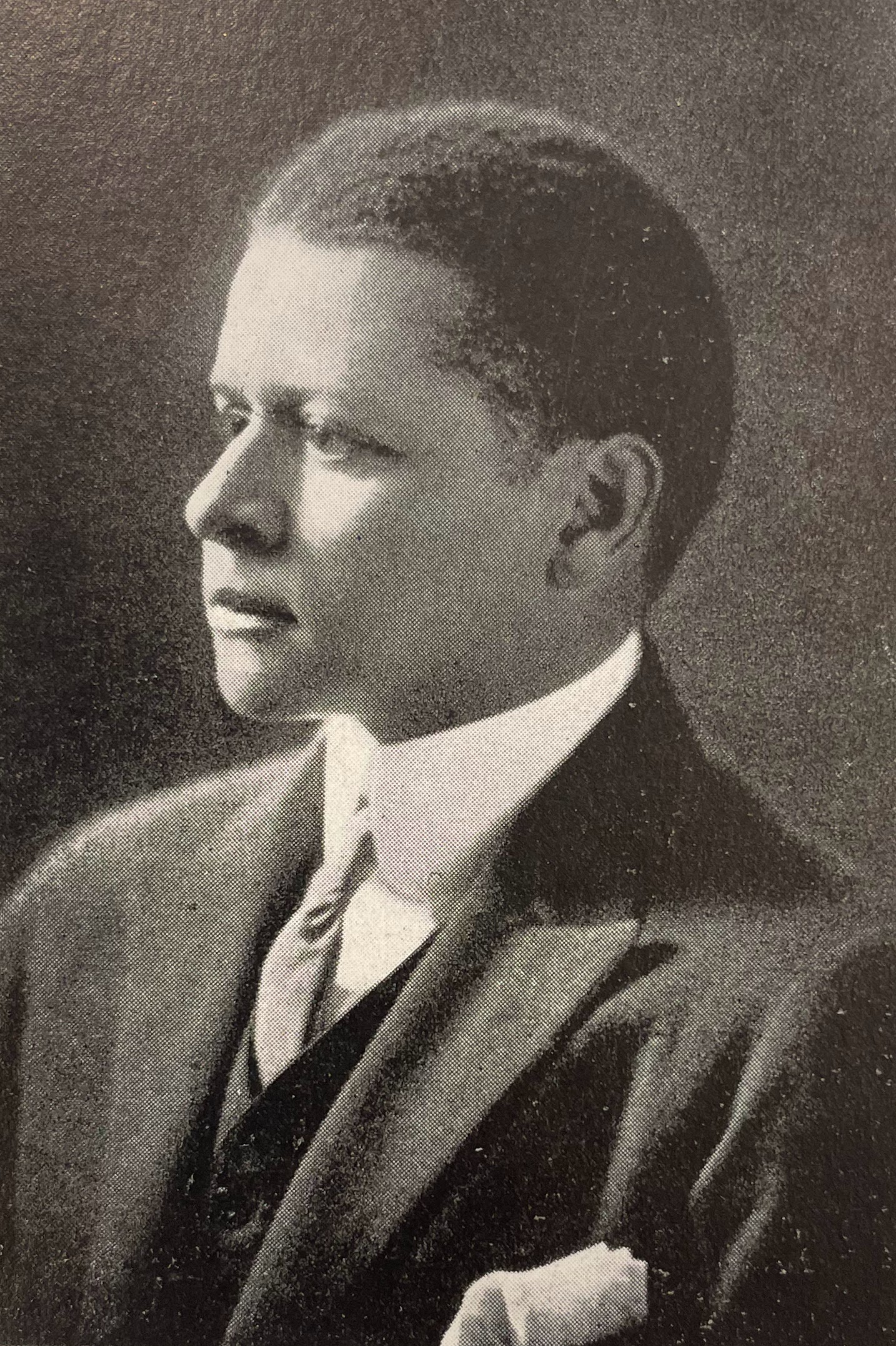
Image of Roger Demosthenes O'Kelly

Roger Demosthenes O'Kelly (October 25, 1880 – July 11, 1962) was a deaf, mute, partially-blind African-American lawyer.

"[O'Kelly] claimed the distinction of being the only Negro deaf lawyer in the United States and the second deaf person to graduate from Yale University in her history of over 250 years."

== Biography ==
Roger O'Kelly was born on October 25, 1880, in Raleigh, North Carolina. O'Kelly became deaf due to Scarlet fever when he was 9 years old, and was "practically mute" as an adult, being able to "speak only to utter brief exclamations." He attended the North Carolina School for Colored Deaf and Blind. He first applied for admission at Gallaudet University in 1898 but his admission was denied; Gallaudet didn't enroll Black students until 1948. He communicated with the hearing world through writing notes on pads, and eventually earned a degree from Shaw University. In 1908, he was licensed by the North Carolina Supreme Court. In 1912, he earned a Bachelor of Laws degree from Yale University. He eventually returned to Raleigh, North Carolina, and established a "lucrative" practice among the local African American community performing legal services relating to domestic relations, real estate, corporations, and abstracts of title. He succeeded as a lawyer while being deaf and living in a segregated state. Mr. O'Kelley was also blind in one eye from a football injury. O'Kelley remarked that he had "one good eye left and would make it anyhow."

After he graduated at Yale University, he opened his own legal service firm called O'Kelly's Legal Bureau in Raleigh, North Carolina, as a legal specialist to provide his legal services for local business people in Raleigh, NC and Granite Quarry, NC.

He married Goldie Weaver on February 25, 1920. They had no children. He died at age 82 on July 11, 1962, in Georgetown, South Carolina.
