= Tashni-Ann Dubroy =

Jamaican academic and university administrator

Executive Vice President, Chief Operating Officer Howard University
- Incumbent
- Assumed office October 2, 2017
- Appointed by: Wayne A.I. Frederick

17th President Shaw University
- In office July 1, 2015 – October 1, 2017
- Preceded by: Gaddis Faulcon
- Succeeded by: Paulette Dillard

Personal details
- Born: Mandeville, Jamaica
- Education: Kingsborough Community College; Shaw University; North Carolina State University; Rutgers University

Tashni-Ann Dubroy (nee Coote; born c. 1981) is a Jamaican academic and university administrator in the United States. She has been executive vice-president and chief operations officer (COO) of Howard University since 2017, having previously served as president of Shaw University from 2015 to 2017.

== Early life ==
Tashni-Ann Dubroy was born in Mandeville, Jamaica, the daughter of Emerson and Greta Coote. She was one of six siblings. Dubroy grew up in May Pen, attending Glenmuir High School. She later moved to the capital Kingston to attend Holy Childhood High and Wolmer's Girls' School.

Dubroy was accepted into the University of West Indies, but for family, reasons chose to move to the United States at the age of 18 to attend Kingsborough Community College in Brooklyn, New York. She was the class valedictorian in 2000, and subsequently pursued further studies at Shaw University (B.Sc. in chemistry, 2002), North Carolina State University (Ph.D. in chemistry, 2007), and Rutgers University (M.B.A. in marketing, 2010). Dubroy's first career was as a research scientist at BASF. She was hired as a global technology analyst within the polyolefin catalysts market sector, and later became a chemical procurement manager.

== Academia ==
=== Shaw University ===
After two years at BASF, Dubroy joined Shaw University – in Raleigh, North Carolina – as an associate professor in chemistry. She eventually became chair of the university's Department of Natural Sciences and Mathematics, and also served as a special assistant to the university president with responsibility for process optimization. In June 2015, the board of trustees announced that Dubroy would be replacing Gaddis Faulcon as university president. Aged 34 at the time, she became the second-youngest president in the university's history and the third woman to hold the post. In its first year, the Dubroy Administration effectively reversed six consecutive years of enrollment declines and yielded a 15 percent increase of new and returning students in 2015.

In 2016, the administration closed a $4 million fundraising gap which included an institutional record $630,000 raised during Shaw’s annual homecoming weekend, and earned positive change in net assets to counteract a two-year loss – all of which earned her honors as 2017 CEO of the Year in the Triangle region. She was named to the 40 Under 40: Excellence in Leadership list by the Triangle Business Journal.

=== Howard University ===
In July 2017, it was announced that Dubroy was resigning from Shaw University to become executive vice-president (EVP) and chief operations officer (COO) at Howard University in Washington, D.C. She began her appointment in October 2017, working under university president Wayne Frederick. Her portfolio includes oversight of the university's divisions of human resources, business auxiliary, enterprise technology, facilities and real estate management, environmental and emergency management, public safety and emergency management, and undergraduate admissions.

Under her leadership, Howard University improved its financial aid standing with the department of education, being removed from Heightened Cash Monitoring status in 2019. She has served as lead on several critical infrastructure recovery efforts, including the restoration of steam plant functionality following a historic winter storm in 2018 and a ransomware attack in 2021. In 2021, Dubroy was named among the Washington Business Journal's 'Women Who Mean Business' in the Washington-Metropolitan area. In 2022, the university announced a historic $785 million construction and real estate acquisition initiative, the largest in Howard's history.
