= The Carolinian (newspaper) =

African-American newspaper published in Raleigh, North Carolina, U.S.

The Carolinian. formerly the Carolina Tribune, is an African-American newspaper published in Raleigh, North Carolina, United States.

Paul R. Jervay Sr. took over the Tribune in 1940 and renamed it Carolinian. Paul R. Jervay Jr. eventually took over the paper from his dad. The Carolina Tribune was published from 1932 until 1940 by a person with the surname Nanton. Jervay's father Robert was also a publisher and his mother and brother, T. C. Jervay, were also in the business. T. C. Published a paper in Wilmington.

It is published twice-weekly. The paper has been described as prominent and politically independent.

== See also ==
- List of African-American newspapers in North Carolina
