= Martin Tupper =

Martin Tupper may refer to:

- Martin Farquhar Tupper, English writer and poet
- Martin Tupper (physician), English physician
- Martin Tupper, protagonist of the sitcom Dream On

== See also ==
- Henry Martin Tupper, American Baptist minister who founded Shaw University
