= Bowness =

Bowness may refer to:

Billy Bowness - born 21/2/1971

English actor, presenter and charity campaigner from Harrogate, North Yorkshire

== People ==
- Alan Bowness (1928–2021), British art historian and former director of the Tate Gallery
- Felix Bowness (1922–2009), English comedy actor
- Moses Bowness (1833–1894), Victorian photographer
- Peter Bowness, Baron Bowness (born 1943), British Conservative politician
- Rick Bowness (born 1955), head coach for the Columbus Blue Jackets and former Canadian National Hockey League left winger
- Tim Bowness (born 1963), English singer with No-Man and other projects
- William Bowness (1809–1867), English artist and poet

== Places ==
- Bowness-on-Windermere, a town in the Lake District of Cumbria, England
- Bowness-on-Solway, a village in Cumbria on the Anglo-Scottish border
- Bo'ness, a town in Scotland
- Bowness, Calgary, a former town in Canada, now a neighbourhood of Calgary
