= Henry Martin Tupper =

American army chaplain (1831–1893)

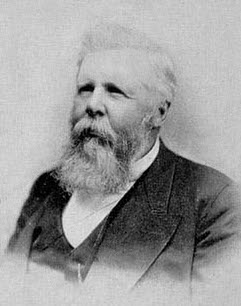
- Henry Martin Tupper, founder of Shaw University
- Born: April 11, 1831; Monson, Massachusetts
- Died: November 12, 1893 (aged 62); Raleigh, North Carolina
- Occupation: Baptist minister
- Known for: Founder and first president of Shaw University

Henry Martin Tupper (April 11, 1831 – November 12, 1893) was an American Baptist minister who founded Shaw University in Raleigh, North Carolina. Beginning with Bible and literacy classes in December 1865, it was the second university established for African Americans following the end of the civil war, and the oldest historically black college and university (HBCU) in the Southern United States, as well as one of the oldest co-educational universities in the country. When the institute moved into a new building in 1871, it was renamed as Shaw Collegiate Institute in honor of a major donor. Tupper served as the university's first president from its founding until his death in 1893.

== Early life and military career ==
Henry Martin Tupper was born on April 11, 1831, to Earl and Permellia Norris Tupper and raised on a farm in Monson, Massachusetts. He was the eldest of nine children. His grandfather, Ezra Tupper, and great-grandfather, William Tupper, had both fought for the colonies in the American Revolutionary War. His paternal ancestry has been linked to a family of prominent Lutheran dissenters who left Germany and settled in England during the reign of Henry VIII. He was a distant relative of Martin Farquhar Tupper, an English poet of the 19th century. Clergyman Thomas Tupper, an ancestor of Henry Martin Tupper, emigrated from England to Barbados in the early 17th century. He later helped found the town of Sandwich, Massachusetts.

Neither of his parents were practicing Christians nor did Martin attend church as a child. He received little formal education until he turned eighteen, when he enrolled in Monson Academy. He converted to Christianity while at the Academy. In order to fund his continuing education, he took a job as a school teacher in New Jersey, where he was baptised in a nearby Baptist church. Later he joined a congregation in Wales, Massachusetts, near his hometown of Monson.

Tupper attended Amherst College and graduated in 1859. He received his divinity degree from Newton Theological Institute in 1862. While at school, he organized bible studies for African-American youth. He also worked as a missionary among recent immigrants in Boston as part of his training. He had planned to serve as a missionary to Africa, however the Civil War intervened. Shortly after being ordained as a minister, he enlisted in the Union Army. Though his education would have qualified him for a military commission, there were no openings in the officer corps, so he enlisted as a soldier.

Tupper was assigned to the Army of the Potomac, Ninth Corps, under the command of Ambrose Burnside. He participated in the Battle of Fredericksburg. He was transferred to General Sherman's Fifteenth Corps in time for the Vicksburg Campaign. He was injured at the Battle of Jackson.

Though Tupper was not an officer, he frequently served as a chaplain, ministering to sick and injured soldiers, and organizing prayer meetings and bible studies among soldiers. While in the army, he became acquainted with the plight of African-American slaves. This inspired his later work.

== Marriage and family ==
On January 25, 1864, he married Sarah Baker Leonard of Stafford, Connecticut. She later joined him in his work, helping teach freedwomen as he taught the men. They had two children, Elizabeth Caroline and Edward Leonard Tupper. Sarah's older brother Judson Wade Leonard, a successful businessman in woolen textiles, helped support Shaw University financially. The medical school was named for him.

== Founder and president of Shaw University ==
After the Civil War, Tupper was commissioned by the Home Mission Society to act as a missionary to freed slaves in the American South. Discharged from the Union Army on July 14, 1865, he and his wife Sarah departed for Raleigh, North Carolina, on October 1 to begin his work. Traveling via train through Portsmouth, Virginia, they had delays due to extensive damage to the rail network caused by the Civil War; they arrived in Raleigh on October 10. The Tuppers began working among the freedmen. He procured food and clothing from the Freedman's Bureau to help support the many homeless black men in Raleigh.

On December 1, 1865, Tupper began teaching bible study classes to freedmen in the Guion Hotel (located where the North Carolina Museum of History is now located). This first bible class marks the traditional foundation date of Shaw University. He used the class as an opportunity to teach the freedmen to read and write, encouraging them to become Baptist ministers, and start their own congregations. In March 1866, Sarah Tupper began teaching freedwomen in similar classes.

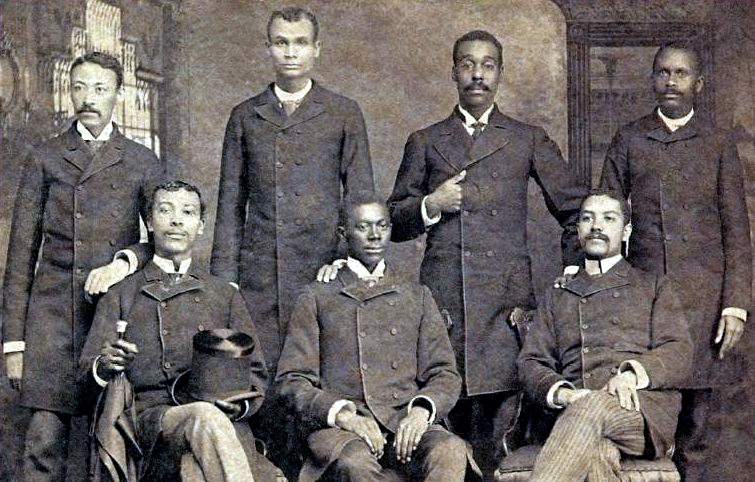
Shaw University medical students, 1889

Having outgrown his temporary location at the Guion Hotel, Tupper purchased a plot of land, using $500 saved from his military service. On the plot, located at the corner of Blount and Cabarrus streets in Raleigh, he constructed a two-story timber building to serve as both a school and church. He named this the Raleigh Institute; it was the first permanent home what would develop as Shaw University. The Home Mission Society and the Freedman's Bureau jointly provided funding for the Institute.

As the school grew, Tupper searched for more space. Nearby to the south was the estate of Paul Barringer, the patriarch of a prominent North Carolina political dynasty. When the land came up for sale, Martin Tupper raised $13,000 for its purchase, mostly from private donors solicited personally by Tupper. The largest single donor was Elijah Shaw, a resident of Wales, Massachusetts, who donated $5,000.

In his honor, the first building on the new campus was named Shaw Hall, and the school was renamed the Shaw Collegiate Institute. Tupper and his students and faculty moved into their new location in 1871. Expansion proceeded quickly, as the first men's dormitory opened in 1872, and the first women's dormitory, Estey Hall (named for another Northern benefactor, Jacob Estey of Brattleboro, Vermont), opened in 1874.

Under Tupper's leadership, the school became chartered by the state as a university in 1875. It added a medical and pharmacy program (Leonard Medical School) in 1881, and a law program in 1888. Each of these programs were the first of their kind for African-American students. Note: Howard University, a historically black university, dates its law school to 1869, when a law department was established by John Mercer Langston. Along with two students, Nicholas Franklin Roberts and Edward Hart Lipscomb, Tupper was an editor of the quarterly journal, African Expositor, founded in 1878.

Tupper's role as the founder of the first university dedicated to educating freedmen attracted opposition. During the Reconstruction era, his home was burned to the ground by the Ku Klux Klan. He and his wife fled and hid in a nearby cornfield. In 1870 the trustees of the local Second Baptist Church of Raleigh sued Tupper on charges of defrauding its members in relation to his fundraising for Shaw College. The suit was settled in his favor in 1875.

== Death ==
Tupper died on November 12, 1893, following a prolonged illness. His funeral was reportedly one of the most attended in the history of Raleigh to that time. Tupper was buried on the campus in front of Shaw Hall.
