= Edward Hart Lipscombe =

American educator and religious leader

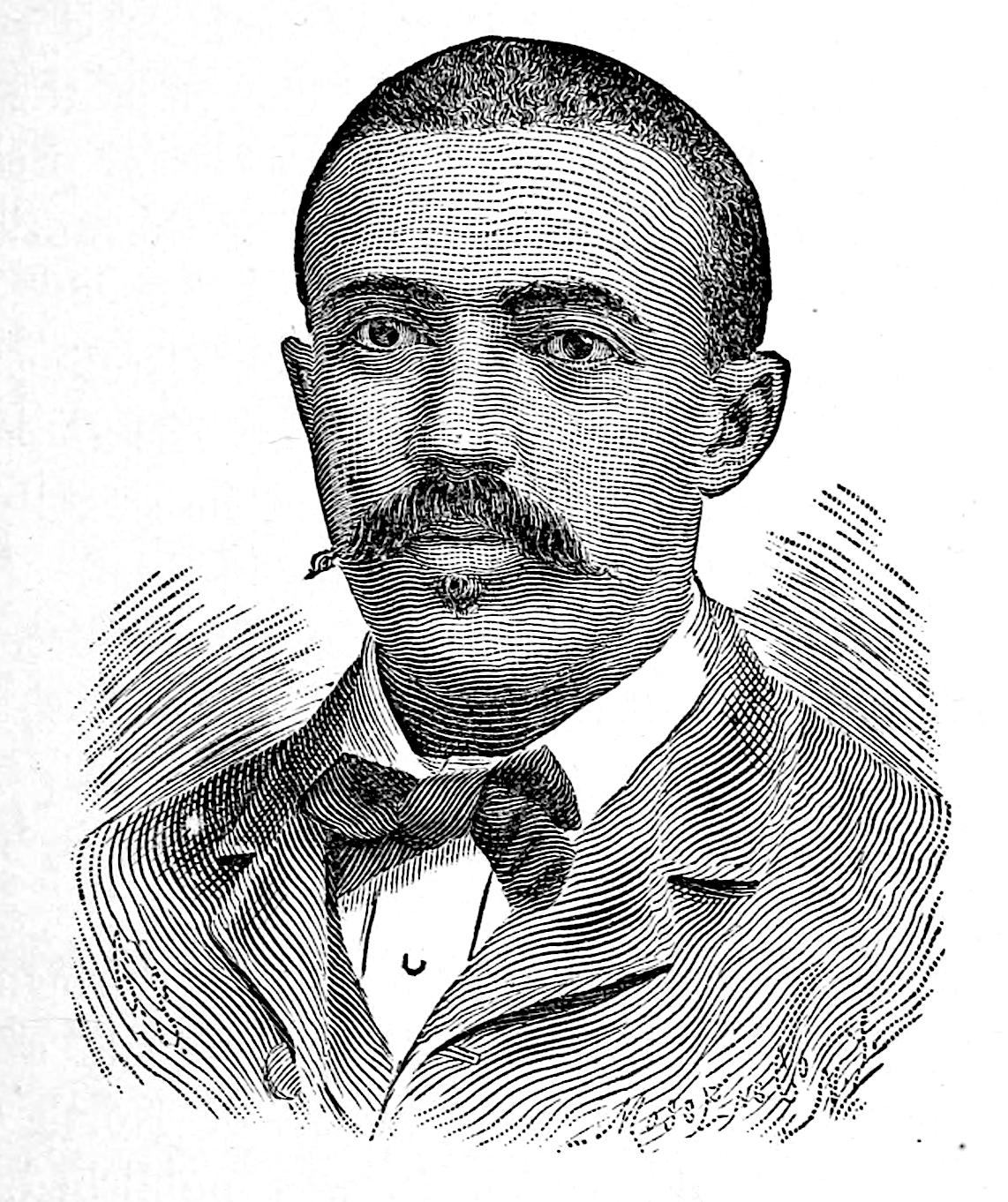
- Lipscombe in 1891
- Born: September 29, 1858; Orange County, North Carolina
- Education: Shaw University
- Occupations: Educator, journalist, minister, poet
- Political party: Republican

Religious life
- Religion: Baptist

Edward Hart Lipscombe (born September 29, 1858) was an educator and religious leader in North Carolina in the late 19th century. He was a professor at Shaw University and a co-founder of the journal, the African Expositor. Later, he became a professor of the Dallas Institute, which he developed into the Western Union Institute, a leading Baptist school in Asheville, North Carolina.

== Early life ==
Lipscombe was born September 29, 1858, in Orange County, North Carolina, the oldest of four children. In 1868 he moved to Raleigh to study in a school run by William Warrick, but in 1870 he returned to the farm where his mother lived to help her with her work. He resumed his studies for a short time in 1871, but soon returned to the farm. In the spring of 1873, Augustus Shepperd of Raleigh invited him to join the North Carolina Jubilee Singers led by Nettie M. Sage and managed by Henry Martin Tupper and preparing for a tour to raise money for Shaw University. Lipscombe joined the group for a tour of New England, Canada and Nova Scotia. After the tour he enrolled at Shaw Collegiate Institute, now Shaw University, where he graduated the youngest member of his class in 1879. As a student in 1877, at the age of 19, together with Shaw professors Tupper and Nicholas Franklin Roberts, he founded and became an editor of the journal, the African Expositor. After graduating he became professor of mathematics and languages at Shaw, a position he held from 1879 to 1881. In 1882 he would receive an A. M. from Shaw.

== Career ==
=== Educator ===
In 1881 he became principal of the Washington Graded School of Raleigh, the largest school in the city. In 1882 he was appointed by the Baptist State Convention of North Carolina as one of the editors of the bodies journal, the Baptist Standard. In 1883 he left the Washington Graded School to become professor of rhetoric and moral philosophy at Shaw, and he returned to edit the Expositor. That year he was also ordained to the ministry and elected clerk of the Baptist State Convention of North Carolina. He also became associated with the temperance movement and worked to gain support for the movement from the Republican Party. His connection with politics came to a head in 1884 when he was nominated as a candidate for the North Carolina General Assembly, but he did not accept it, preferring to remain involved in education.

In 1884 he was for a short time the principal of Durham Graded School, before becoming principal of the Dallas Academy in Dallas, Gaston County, North Carolina. The school was run by the Western Baptist Missionary Union, and Lipscombe was very successful at the school. His role at the school extended to the menial, and he even led students in collecting lumber for the school's heating and carpentry needs. In 1886, he was made educational adviser for the county of Gaston by the North Carolina State Teachers' Association. He also helped form a branch of the National Prohibition Party in Gaston County. In 1886, through the efforts of Lipscombe, the Dallas institute moved to Asheville and changed its name to the Western Union Institute with Lipscombe as president.

=== Community leader ===
In the 1890s and 1900s, Lipscombe became principal of the Catholic Hill School in Asheville. Lipscombe also became president of the Asheville Young Men's Institute. In 1898, during the buildup for the Spanish–American War, Lipscombe helped recruit black soldiers from the Institute, particularly for the Third Regiment at Fort Mason. In 1899, he was hired to be head of the department of civil government and United States History for the summer normal school (teachers college) at North Carolina Agricultural and Technical State University in Greensboro. In 1904 he became financial agent and principal of the Zion Academy. In 1906, he became pastor of the First Baptist Colored Church in Wadesboro, North Carolina.

=== Other activities ===
Along with being an editor, Lipscombe contributed a number of poems to the African Expositor and elsewhere. He was also co-founder and editor of the religious paper, the Light-House, which started in 1884 and in 1886 changed its name to the Mountain Gleaner.

== Family ==
In 1882 he married Lizzie L. Taylor of Lynchburg, Virginia, and they had three sons and one daughter. The daughter, the youngest, was the only child to survive to adulthood.
