= Nicholas Franklin Roberts =

Baptist minister and educator (1849–1934)

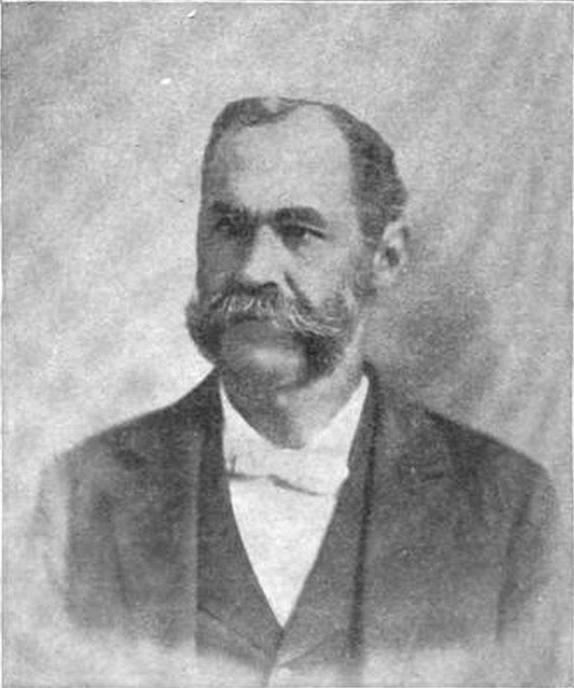
- Roberts from a 1902 publication
- Born: October 13, 1849; Seaboard, North Carolina, U.S.
- Died: June 25, 1934 (aged 84); Raleigh, North Carolina, U.S.
- Education: Shaw University
- Occupations: Teacher; mathematician; minister; journalist
- Political party: Republican

Religious life
- Religion: Baptist

Nicholas Franklin Roberts (October 13, 1849 – June 25, 1934) was a leading Baptist minister and educator in Raleigh, North Carolina. He was a faculty member and for a short time acting president at Shaw University. He was also a city alderman in Raleigh and served on the county board of education.

== Early life and education ==
Nicholas Franklin Roberts was born in Seaboard, Northampton County, North Carolina on October 13, 1849. As a child, he worked on a farm. He showed aptitude for mathematics at a young age and entered Shaw University (then Shaw Collegiate Institute) on October 10, 1871. He graduated in May 1878 and was then hired as a professor of Mathematics at Shaw.

Roberts was active in Republican politics, even as a student, serving as secretary of a Republican county meeting in July 1872. Along with Shaw University president, Henry Martin Tupper, and fellow student, Edward Hart Lipscombe, Roberts was an editor of the quarterly journal, African Expositor, founded in 1878 and was later the business manager of the Baptist Sentinel.

== Baptist church service ==
In March 1872, he converted to the Baptist religion and on May 20, 1877 he was ordained a minister. On July 2, 1882, he was made pastor of Blount Street Baptist Church in Raleigh, North Carolina. From 1873 to 1883, he was president of the State Sunday School convention, a position he served in many times. He was also elected president of the State Baptist Convention numerous times, first in October 1885. He was made general missionary among the poor in North Carolina by the American Baptist Home Mission Society in 1881. He resigned as pastor of the Blount Street Baptist Church in August 1891 to focus on his other activities.

== Public service ==
Roberts was heavily involved in political, educational, and religious organizations and served as an officer of many bodies. He was vice president of the state Colored Education Convention in 1877. In 1886, he was an alderman in Raleigh and a member of the street committee. He was elected to the county school board in 1897. He also led the Institute for Colored Teachers in the early 1900s.

In late 1897 and early 1898, Roberts hosted South African tribal nobility, including the grandson of Chief Kama (also called King Kama) of Kaffraria and the nephew of Chief William Shaw Kama, Alfred Impey, as Alfred attended Shaw University. However, Impey died of consumption in North Carolina in April 1898.

Shaw served as acting head of Shaw University for five months after Tupper died on November 12, 1893, serving from that date until March 14, 1894. He later held the positions of vice-president, dean of faculty, and dean of the theology department.

== Personal life and death ==
He married Mary S. Chavis of Union, North Carolina in 1904. He died on June 25, 1934. Roberts Lane in Oberlin Village was named for him.
