= John Close =

English doggerel poet

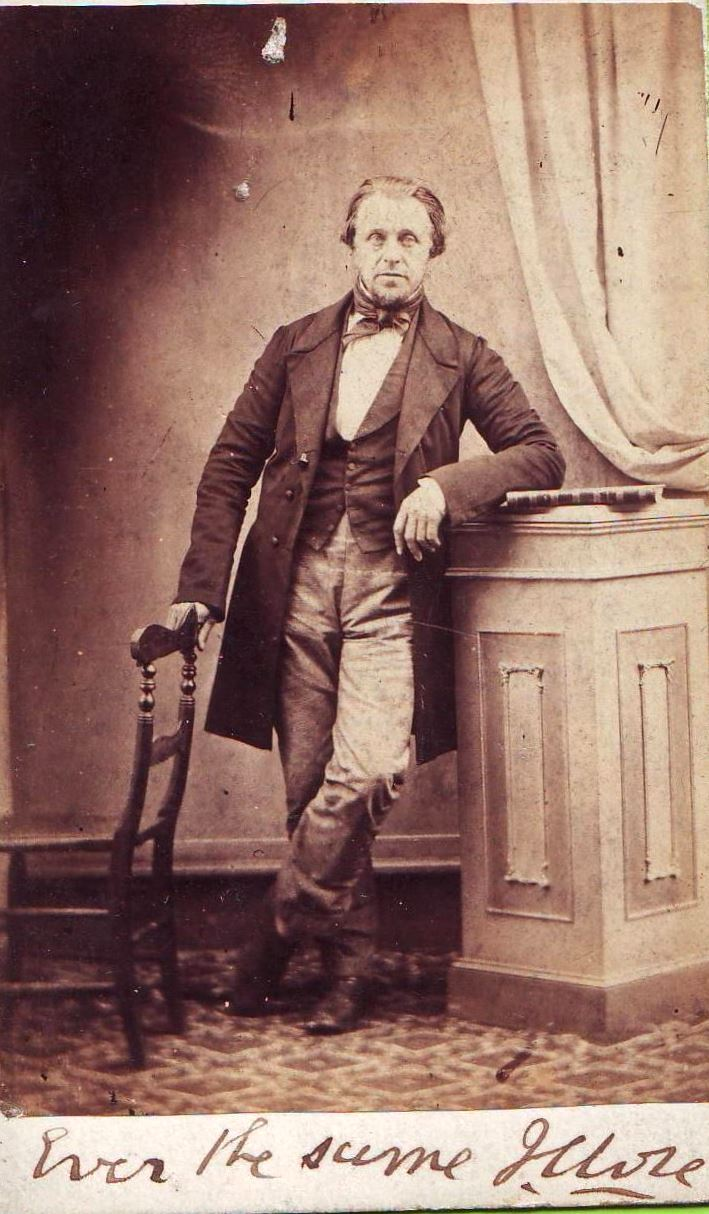
The poet's calling card, created by Moses Bowness and autographed with Close's motto, "Ever the same"

John Close, also known as Poet Close, was born on 11 August 1816 at Gunnerside and died at Kirkby Stephen on 15 February 1891. He was an enterprising and prolific writer of working class origin who catered to the English Lake District tourist trade. Of only local significance before 1860, what brought him national notoriety was his being granted and then stripped of a Civil List pension that year.

== Early life ==
'Poet Close' was born in the Yorkshire Swaledale as the son of Jarvis Close, a butcher who was well known as a Wesleyan local preacher. Soon after 1830, while still working for his father, Close began issuing fly-sheets of verse which he sold at markets, his first substantial prose work being The Satirist, written when he was sixteen. Both the 1841 and 1851 census record John as still living with his parents in Kirkby Stephen. In 1842 he published The Book of the Chronicles: Winter Evening Tales of Westmorland. This was a miscellany of prose and verse, featuring Kirkby Stephen under the name “Little-Town” and his own poems ascribed to one of his many aliases, Tom Dowell. It was printed in Appleby and the many typographical errors and omissions so annoyed him that in 1846 he established himself as a printer.

The Dictionary of National Biography remarked of Close that “he may be termed a survival of the old packman-poet” or itinerant ballad seller. His published broadsides and ballads on local subjects were not always appreciated, however. In 1856 he was sued for libel, resulting in £300 damages being awarded against him, leaving him in reduced circumstances. It was now his assiduity in including his friends and neighbours in his verse, and more especially the gentry of the district, bore fruit in a petition to remedy his poverty with a Civil List pension on the grounds of his contribution to literature. This was granted in April 1860 and resulted in questions being asked in Parliament about the bestowal of such recognition on a hitherto unknown Lake Poet and the pension was rescinded. Close received instead a royal grant of £100 in compensation and continued for the next thirty years to issue printed statements relating to his wrongs.

The case was widely reported, not only in Great Britain but also in the United States and in colonial papers, where he was attacked particularly on the basis of his recently published The Poetical Works of J. Close. The main accusations were that his poetry was no more than doggerel; that he wrote for venal reasons; and that his claim to be appointed laureate “Under Royal Patronage” by a West African chief made him appear a buffoon (as he was described in Punch) or, as The Caledonian put it, “the privileged idiot of a county”. According to his own account (writing under one of his aliases), Close's poem on “The Sorrows of Royalty” had so impressed King William Dappa Pepple, the temporarily deposed monarch of the West African Kingdom of Bonny, that he made Close his poet laureate and drew up an official paper to confirm it. Close's egalitarian sympathy was later manifested by his account of an amicable meeting with the former slave James Watkins during his lecturing tour of Britain in 1861.

One of the most detailed demonstrations that the poet's pen was for hire appeared in the American Harper's New Monthly Magazine, giving as evidence his endorsement of Dr Rooke’s ‘Oriental Pills’ and of the Kendal carpet manufacturer John Whitwell. Punch also wrote several burlesques of the poet's huckstering verse, including “The Laureate to his Princess of Bonny", hinting at the mercenary motive behind the poet’s dedications. Close himself naively admits that his effusions of gratitude stem from benefits received, nor was he slow to denounce those who did not respond upon receipt of his unsolicited publications:

Alas! our proud nobility
Have scarcely common sense;
Who coolly take the Poet’s Books
And grudge him thanks or pence!

== Poet to the tourist trade ==
What came to Close's rescue just in time was the growing tourist trade that followed the opening of Kirkby Stephen railway station in 1861. During the season he sold his books there and at a stall near the steamer landing stage at Bowness-on-Windermere. A sketch of the author going about his commercial business later reached the Confederate States of America through the medium of a travel report in the magazine The Land We Love.

At Kirkby Stephen, where the train stops for refreshments, there appears upon the platform, and at the window of the carriage, with unkempt hair and his arms full of books which he offers for sale at the lamentably small price of three and sixpence a copy, a middle aged man who is the minnersinger and troubadour of the border…He strews the express train with his handbills and recites his verses in the refreshment room. The handbills are adorned with the royal arms, with the Prince of Wales and “The Emperor of France” as supporters, and the array of royal, ducal and episcopal personages who are mentioned as his admiring patrons is quite overpowering.

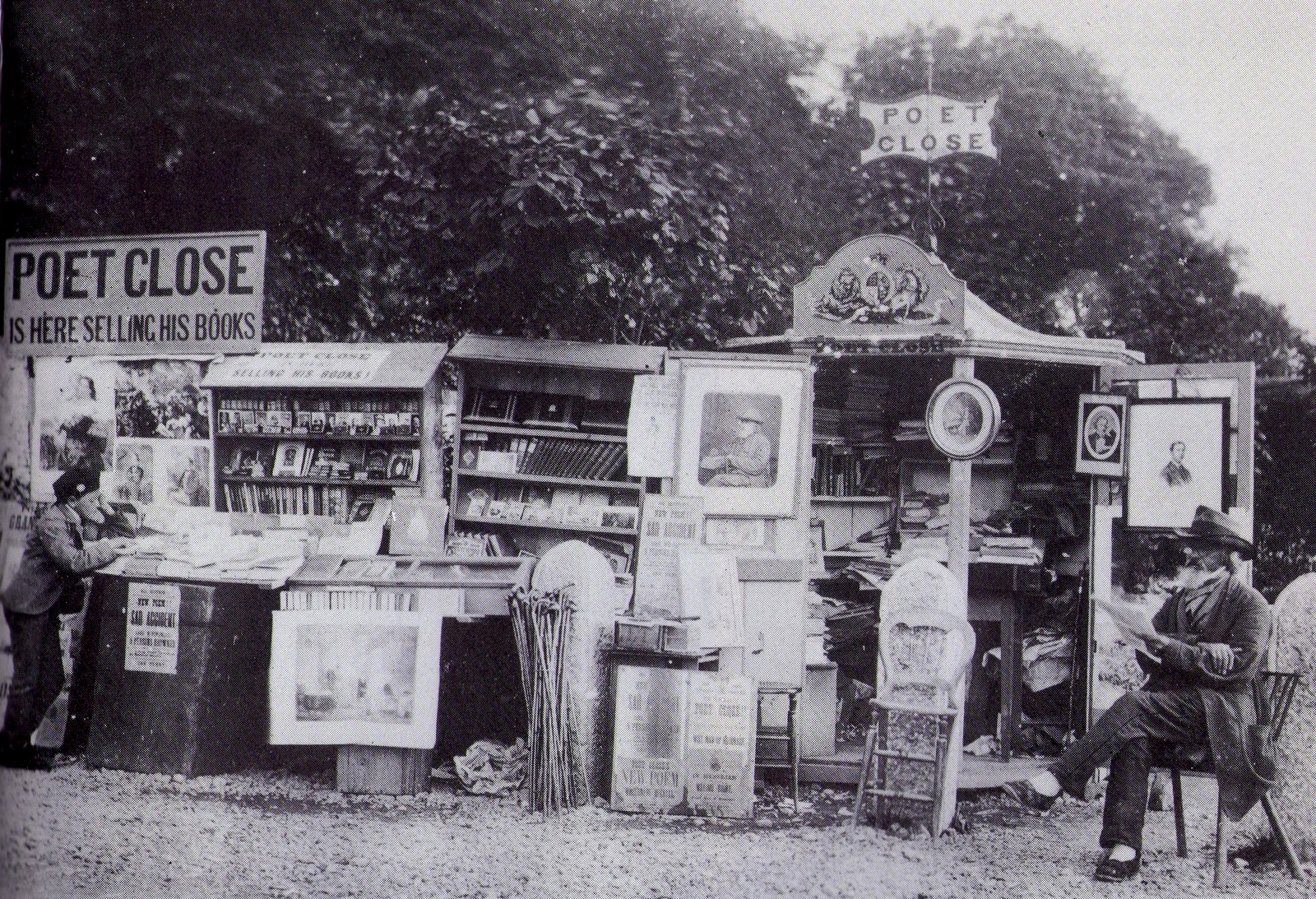
The poet at his Bowness bookstall in 1875

An indefatigable self-promoter and in a position to publish his own work regardless of quality, Close renamed his place of business 'Poet's Hall'. He also formed an alliance with local photographer Moses Bowness. While the latter mass-produced publicity photographs of him and sold his books, Close wrote about and advertised the Bowness studio in his publications. Those for tourist consumption ranged from the two-page “Impromptu Poem: On the Beauties of Windermere and Carver's Memorial Church” (1880) to the 64 illustrated pages of “Poet Close's Grand Lake Book” (1869). The breadth of local coverage included the 34 stanzas of “The Windermere Regatta” (1866), the three-page “Grand Marriage Poem on the Marriage of the Earl of Lonsdale” (1878) and the four-page blank verse “Grand Electioneering Poem” (1880).

As a local character, Close frequently included news of himself as well. 72 pages of correspondence, poems, and commentary were given to Poet Close and His Pension: Shewing how it was Got, who Took it from Him, and what the Queen Sent Him from the Royal Bounty (1861). More modestly, he devoted 15 pages to Poet Close's New Poem on the Late Awful Fire in His Bookstall: On August 26th, 1875, Bowness, Windermere, and just a single sheet to "Poet's Close's Sad Misfortune at the Lakes, and what the Rats Did” (1884). His prolific publications also included an annual "Christmas Book" which, in addition to his own verses, news and correspondence, reviewed the year's events in the district.

In 1858 Close had married Eliza Early, by whom he was to have four sons and a daughter. After his death in 1891, he was buried in Kirkby Stephen cemetery.

== Legacy ==
The memory of this colourful character survived in a number of ways. In 1887 a racehorse was named after him, no doubt because it had been sired by another called Laureate. There was also an amusing contemporary reference to 'Poet Close' in W. S. Gilbert's “Ferdinando and Elvira, or the Gentle Pieman”, later included in his Bab Ballads. In this Elvira's lover goes in search of the author of the rhymed mottos in crackers and approaches various popular poets of the day.

In the 20th century, Close's verse earned him a place among the great in The Stuffed Owl anthology of bad verse. He is now included in reference textbooks such as The Stanford Companion to Victorian Fiction (1990) and Mid-Victorian Poetry, 1860-1879, as well as appearing in the database of the Labouring-Class Writers Project.
