= Moses Bowness =

Victorian photographer, farmer, entrepreneur and poet

Moses Bowness (1833–1894) was a Victorian photographer, farmer, entrepreneur and poet.

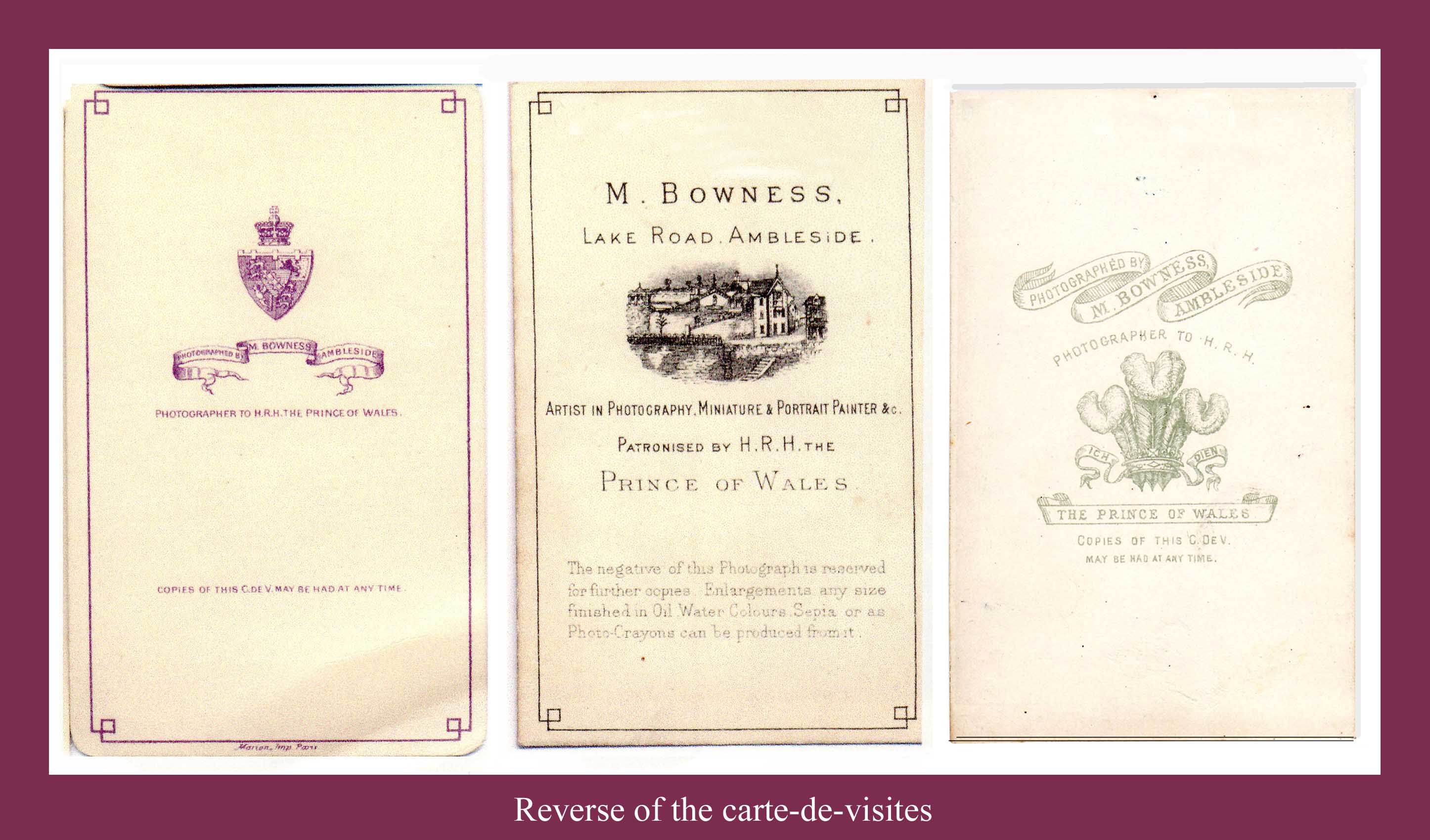
Various reverse designs of Moses Bowness' c-d-v

Born into a copper-miner's family, he built in Ambleside in the Lake District, England, the largest photographic business in Westmorland at that time. He photographed many notable people and visitors, as well as local views and residents. In May 1857 he photographed the visiting party of the young Prince of Wales, later King Edward VII. The Prince recorded this event in his diary. From then on the reverse of his carte-de-visite say "Photographer to HRH the Prince of Wales".

He trained a number of local photographers, including Charles Walmsley and Herbert Bell, whose family he photographed and who later bought his archive.

He took an active part in the development of the tourist trade; built shops and lodging-houses; farmed 500 acres at Low Wray, Wray Castle, and exhibited a few views at the Royal Photographic Society in 1877. He worked with the local people to save Stock Ghyll; and gave evidence to the Parliamentary Enquiry into the Railway extension, and used some of his views to support his argument. He still found time to write poetry for the Ambleside Herald.

His first wife was the widow of a local builder; his second the daughter and heiress of Josiah Hudleston, member of the East India Company and noted musician.

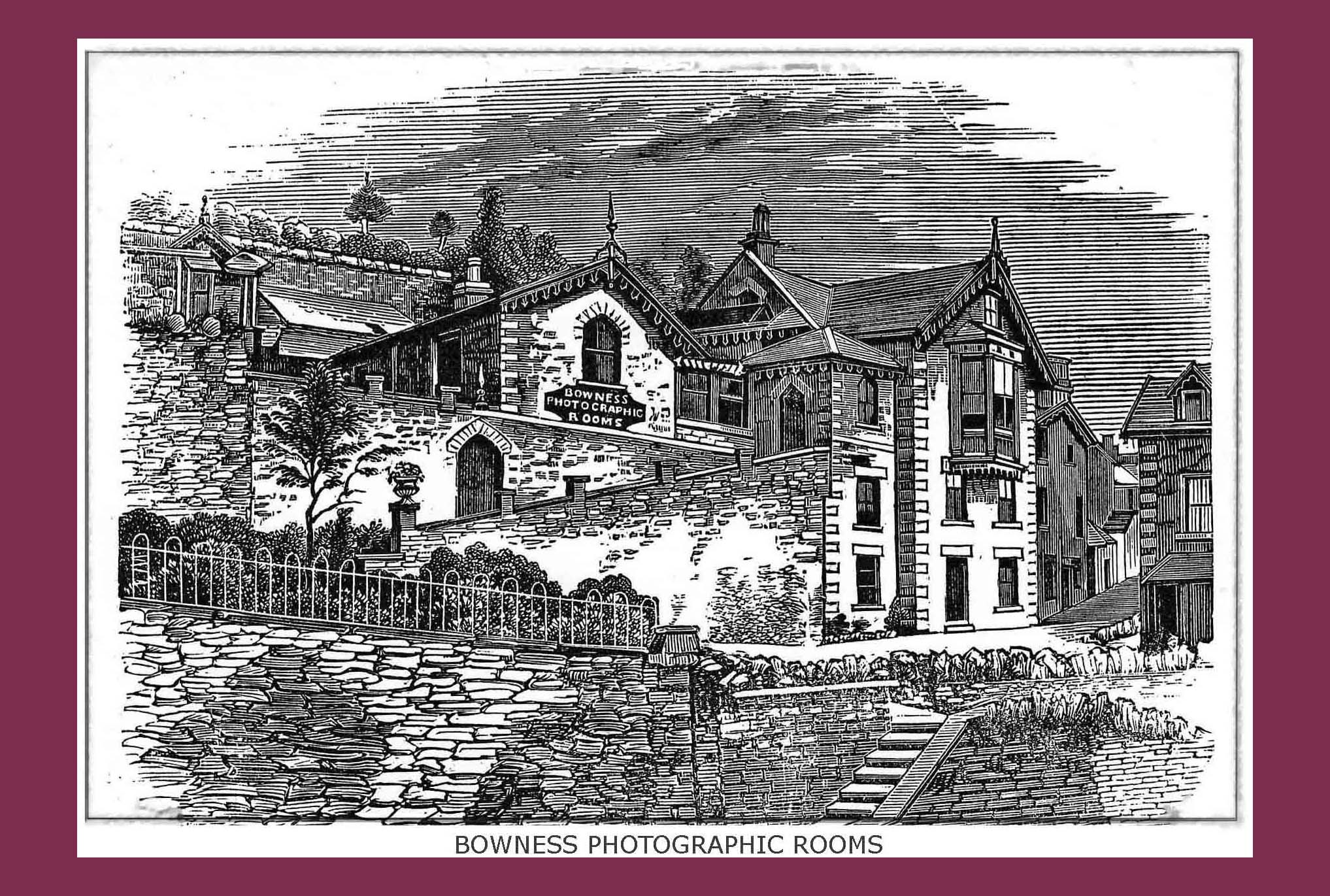
Moses Bowness Photographic Establishment

Moses became acquainted with the eccentric 'Poet Close' in 1860 and they helped each other's businesses in that Moses photographed him and sold his books, while John Close wrote about and advertised his studio in his various pamphlets and books.

The picture shows the many buildings connected with his business. He built his lodging house, Vale View - now The Churchill Hotel - on the land in the foreground .

Some of his sitters include Wordsworth's younger relatives and are now in the Wordsworth Trust;

William Edward Forster and Harriet Martineau are both in the National Portrait Gallery; and Charlotte Mason is in the Armitt

The National Portrait Gallery, The Wordsworth Trust at Grasmere; the Armitt Museum in Ambleside, and Kendal Local Studies Centre all own a number of his photographs. Others are in private hands.

Moses Bowness, Victorian Photographer 1834-1894

Moses Bowness Photographer, Farmer, Entrepreneur, Poet.

Born. 1833 in Coniston to John Bowness & Jane née Mossop.

Married. 1st Isabella Slater. 2nd. Helena Hudleston.

Died. 23 April 1894. Buried in his family grave in Coniston

Some Examples of his work

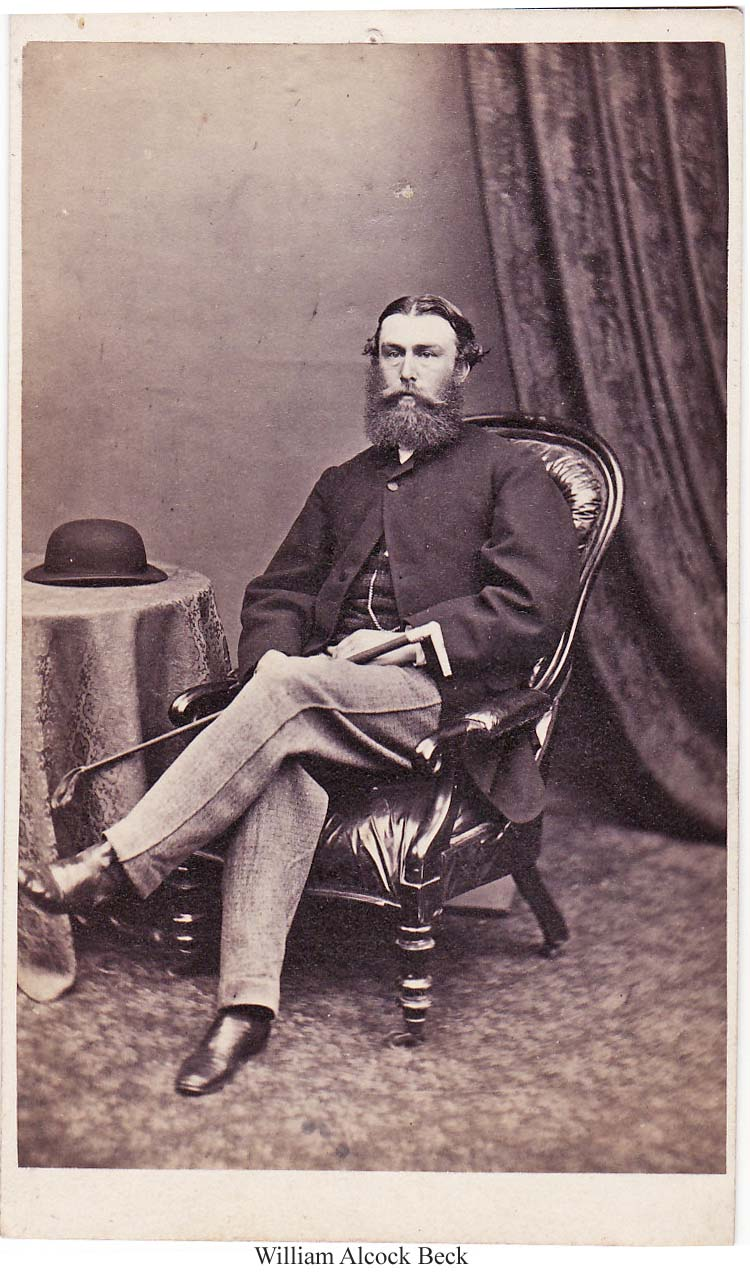
W A Beck

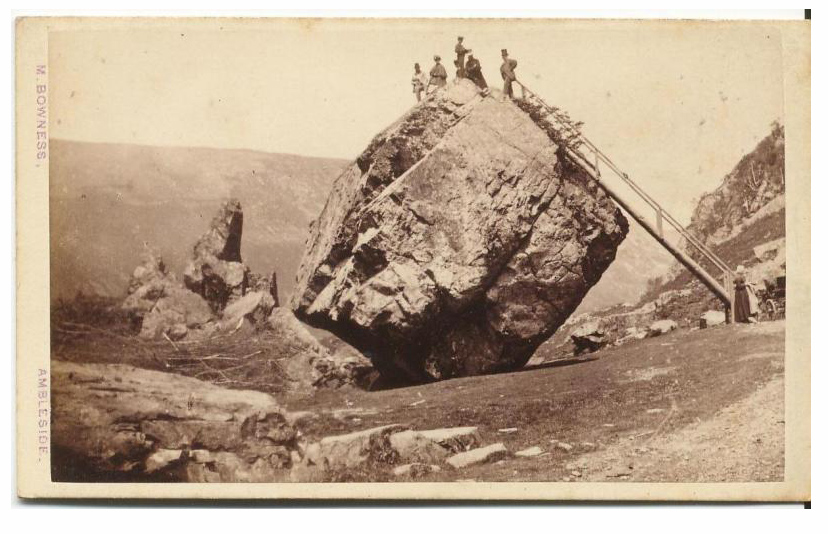
The Bowder Stone

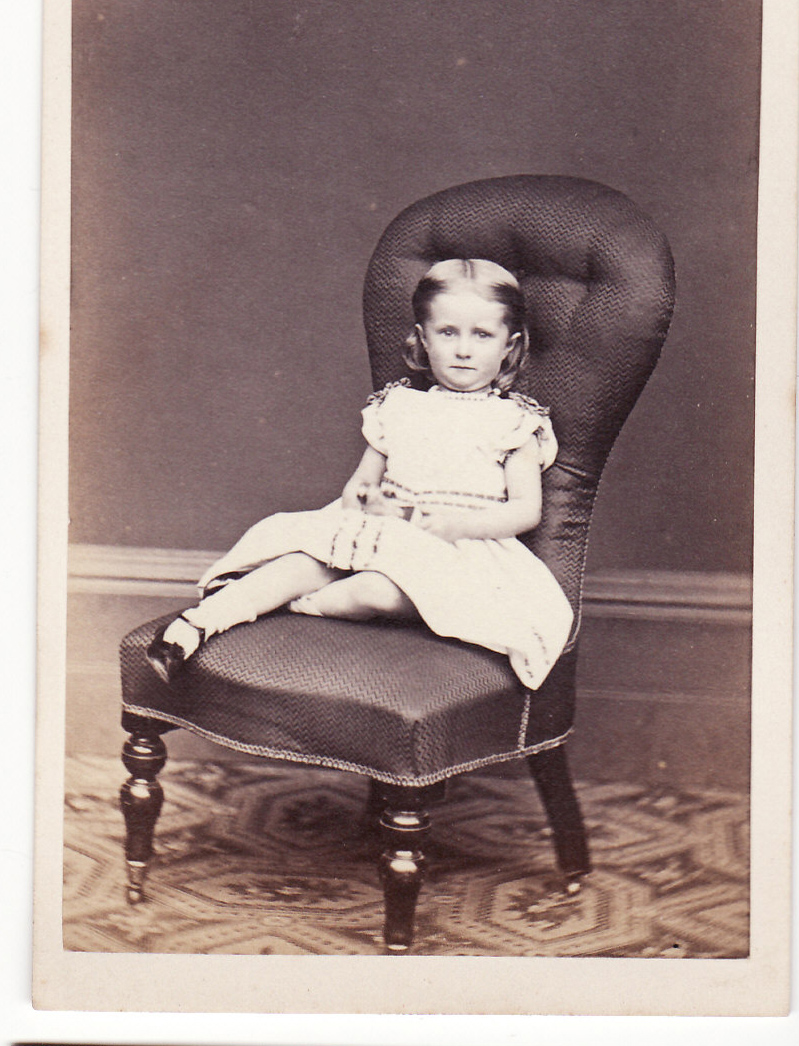
Frances Holden

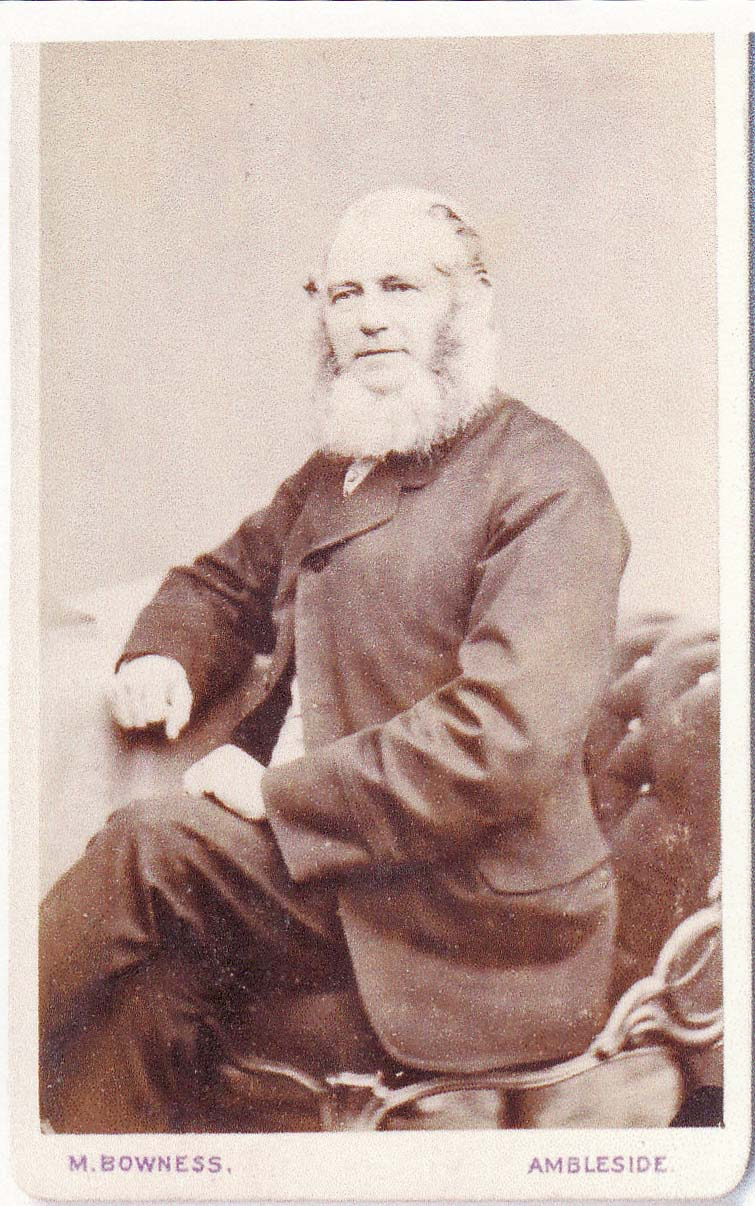
William Barratt

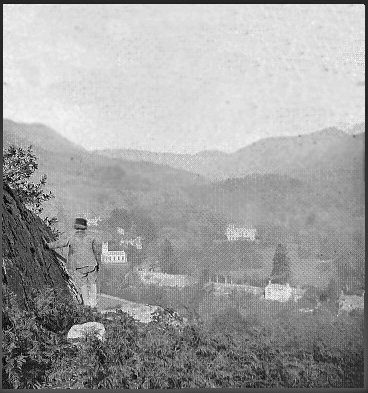
View Rydal church & hall cirra 1860.jpg

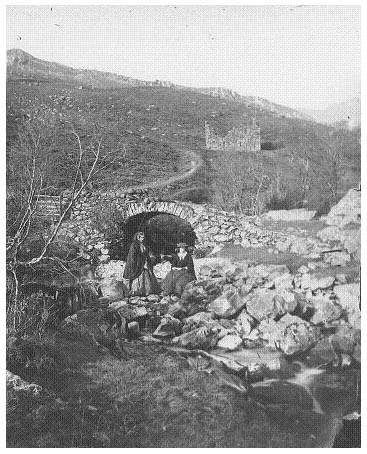
Bridge in Westmorland

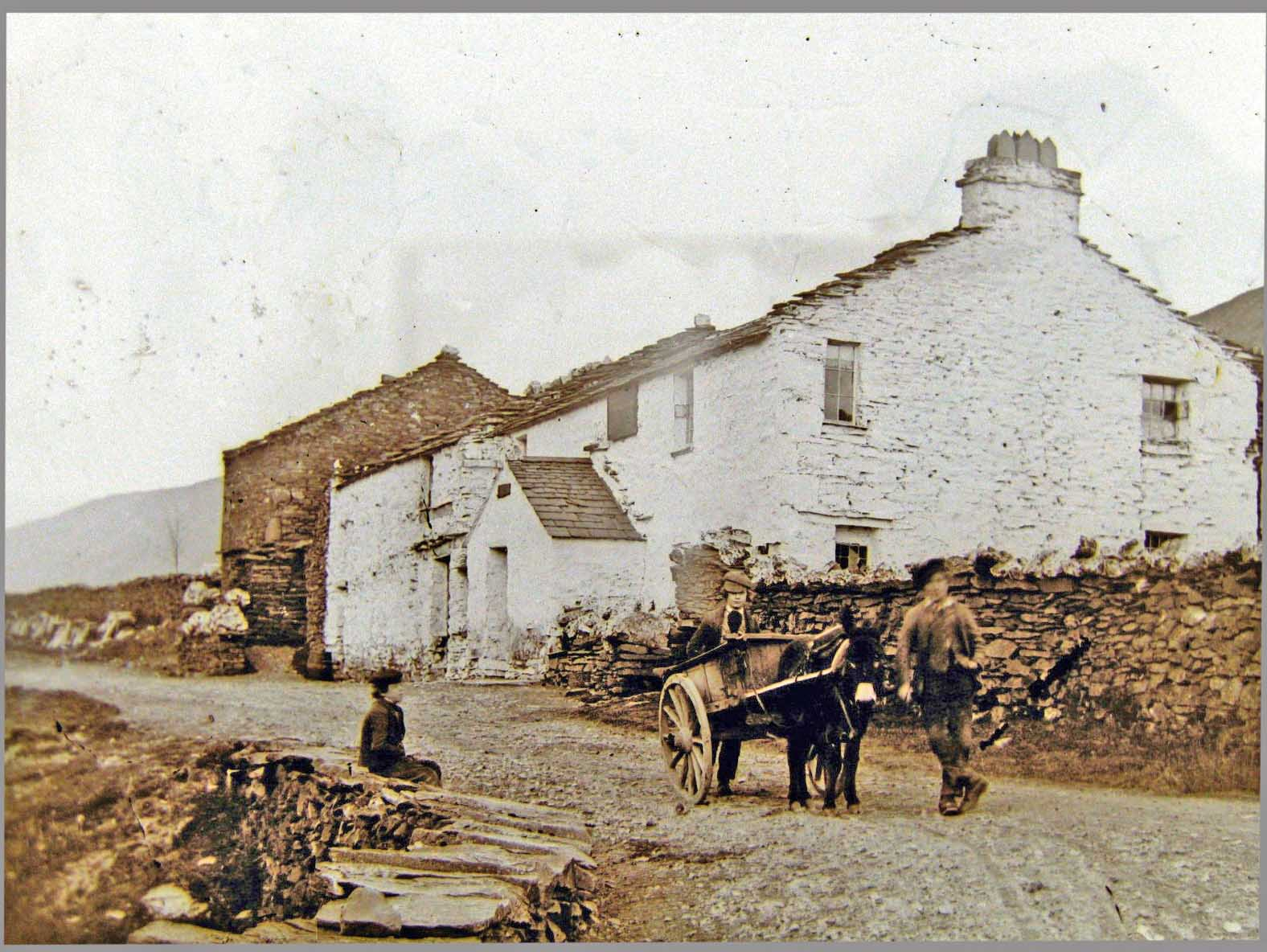
Kirkstone Inn cirra 1858

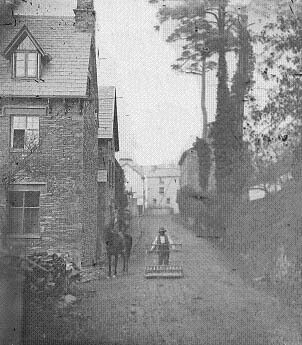
Ambleside road mender

== Printed references ==
- Academic article in the Transactions of the Cumberland & Westmorland Antiquarian & Archaeological Society. CWAAS 2009 Vol IX. pp 225–231. with footnotes and references.“Moses Bowness, Photographer, and the Promotion of Tourism in the Nineteenth Century.”.
- Ambleside Herald 1880 various weeks - poems by MB.
- "Poet Close Christmas Books" 1870,71,72 (Kirby Stephen. John Close)
- "Victorian Lakeland Photographers" by Stephen F.Kelly pub. Shrewsbury, Swan Hill 1991 "Says '. . that we shall never know, for instance, about Moses Bowness who trained a number of fine lakeland photographers'.
- Royal Windsor Archive RAVIC/MAIN/EV11D/1857 May 9–20.
- Westmorland Gazette 16th & 23 May 1857 The Prince of Wales in the Lake District.
- Westmorland Gazette 28 April 1894 Obituary & Inquest.
