= Martin Farquhar Tupper =

English poet and novelist (1810–1889)

Martin Farquahar Tupper FRS
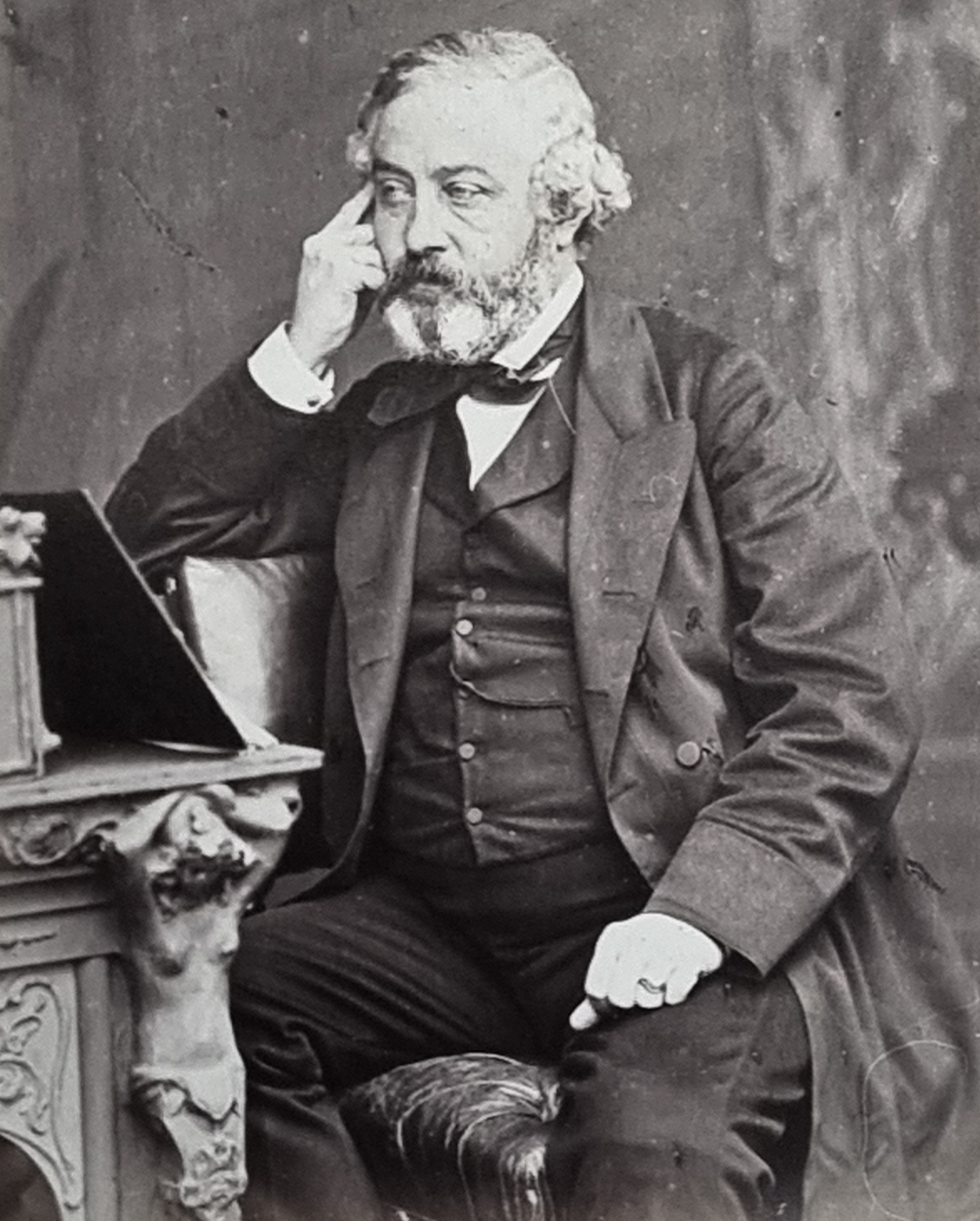
- Martin Farquhar Tupper, c. 1863
- Born: 17 July 1810; 20 Devonshire Place, London, England
- Died: 29 November 1889 (aged 79); Underhill, 13 Cintra Park, Upper Norwood, London, England
- Education: Christ Church, Oxford (BA, MA, DCL)
- Occupations: Poet; author
- Spouse: Isabella Devis (m. 1835; died 1885)
- Children: 8
- Relatives: Martin Tupper (father)
- Writing career
- Period: 1832–1886
- Genre: Victorian literature
- Notable work: Proverbial Philosophy

Martin Farquhar Tupper FRS (17 July 1810 – 29 November 1889) was an English poet and novelist. He was one of the most widely-read English-language authors of his day with the poetry collection Proverbial Philosophy, which was a bestseller in the United Kingdom and North America for several decades.

Tupper found great success in Victorian Britain at a relatively early age, with a second series of the poetry collection Proverbial Philosophy in 1842. The work's fame later spread to the US and Canada, and it continued to be popular for several decades. The author capitalised on this success with scores of editions in various formats and tours in his homeland and in North America, and as one of Queen Victoria's favourite poets he was once a serious contender for the position of Poet Laureate of the United Kingdom. However, Proverbial Philosophy eventually fell out of fashion, and its previous eminence made the poetry and its author popular targets for satire and parody.

Despite his prodigious output and ongoing efforts at self-promotion, Tupper's other work did not achieve anywhere close to the bestseller status of Proverbial Philosophy, and even towards the end of the poet's own lifetime he had become obscure. Nevertheless, the style of Proverbial Philosophy (which Tupper referred to as "rhythmics" rather than poetry) had an influence on admirer Walt Whitman, who was also experimenting with free verse. Considered by later generations to be artefacts of their time, Tupper's works have largely been forgotten, and as of 2002 had been out of print for over a century.

== Early life ==
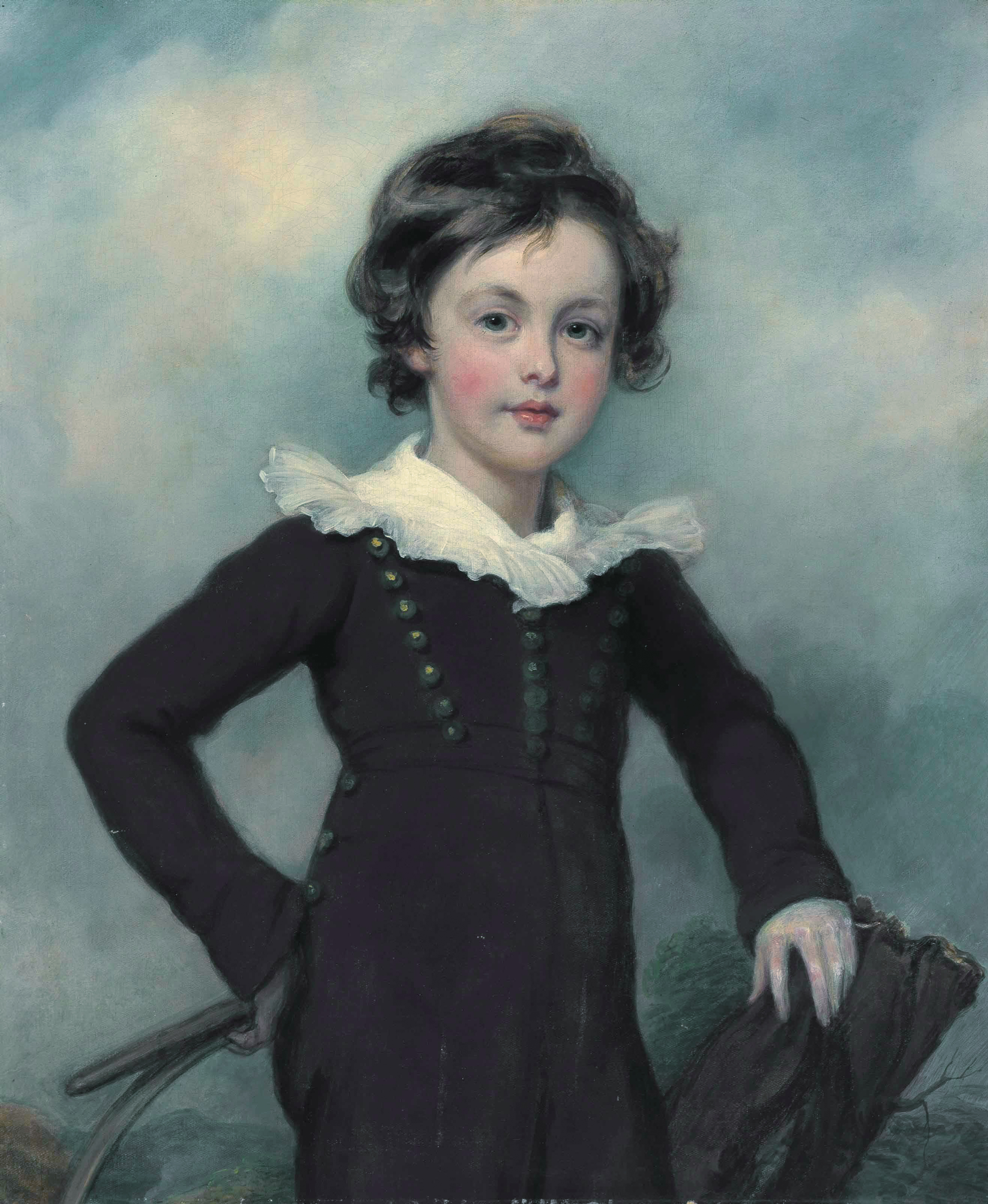
Martin F. Tupper aged 10 (Arthur William Devis)

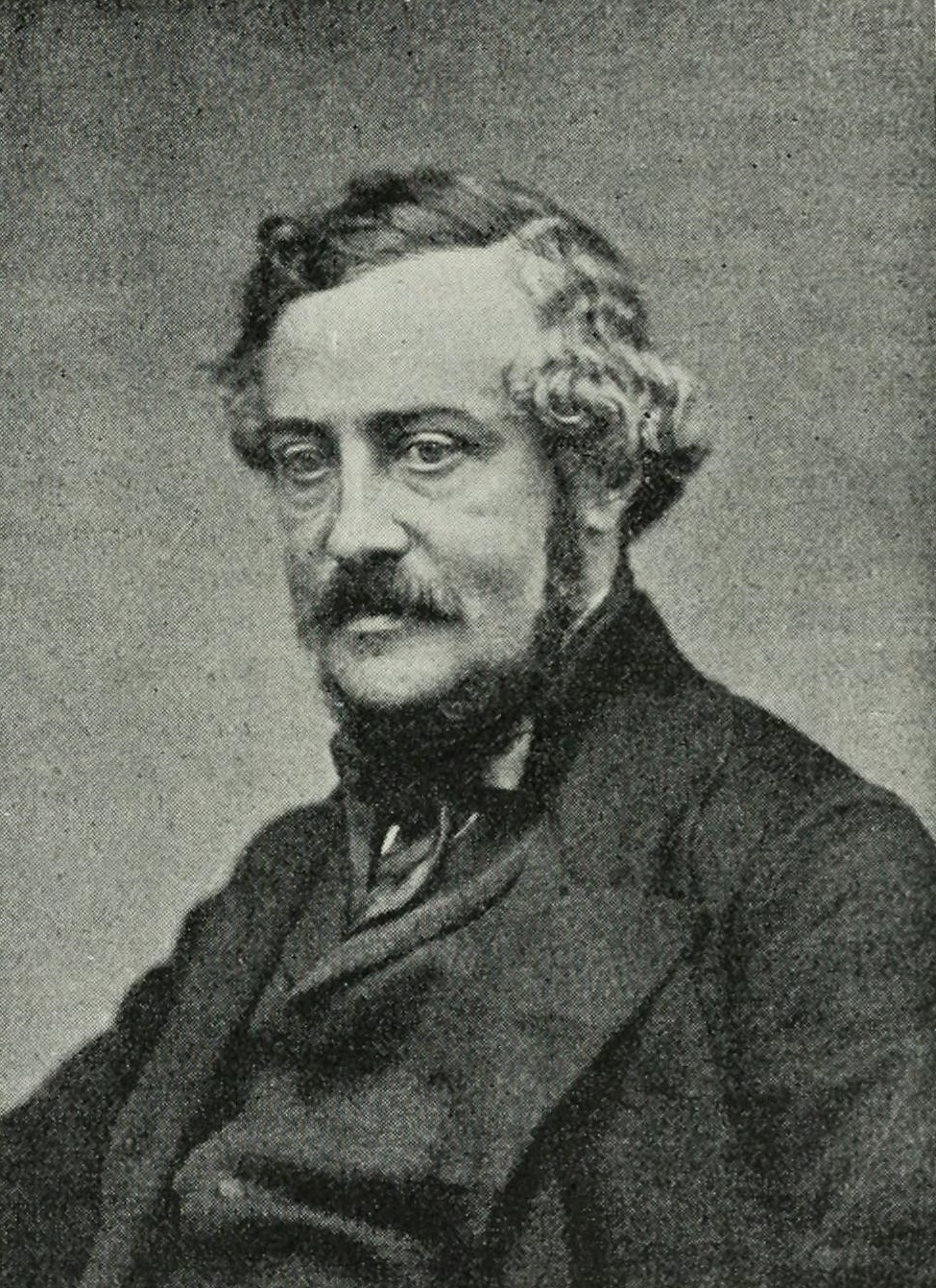
Photo of Martin Farquhar Tupper

Martin Farquhar Tupper was born on 17 July 1810 at 20 Devonshire Place, London. He was the eldest child of Dr. Martin Tupper, an esteemed doctor from an old Guernsey family, and his wife Ellin Devis Marris, the daughter of landscape painter Robert Marris (1749–1827) and granddaughter of Arthur Devis.

Martin F. Tupper received his early education at Eagle House School and Charterhouse, going on to attend Christ Church, Oxford where he received a BA in 1832. At university he was the classmate of many distinguished men, including future politicians James Broun-Ramsay, James Bruce, Henry Pelham-Clinton, Charles Canning, George Cornewall Lewis and William Ewart Gladstone, as well as literary figures Francis Hastings Doyle, Henry Liddell and Robert Scott. He maintained a close friendship with Gladstone until the final years of his life.

From a young age Tupper suffered from a severe stammer, which precluded him from going into the church or politics. Having taken the further degree of MA, Tupper became a student at Lincoln's Inn and was called to the bar in 1835, but did not ever practise as a barrister.

On 26 November of the same year Tupper married his first cousin Isabella Devis, (Note: Also known as Isabelle, Tupper's preferred name for her, or "Issy".) daughter of Arthur William Devis, in St Pancras Church, having proposed to her before leaving for university seven years previously. He acquired a house on Park Village East, near Regent's Park, and the couple was financially supported by his father. While living here, Tupper attended St James' Chapel on Hampstead Road (now demolished), where he became acquainted with its minister Henry Stebbing. An author and former editor of the literary magazine the Athenaeum, Stebbing's encouragement of Tupper's writings eventually led to the publication of Proverbial Philosophy.

== Career ==
=== Early works ===
While at Oxford, Tupper's literary career commenced; his first important publication was a collection of 75 short poems entitled Sacra Poesis (1832). In the same year he wrote a long poem partially in blank verse, "A Voice from the Cloister", but this was only published, anonymously, in 1835.

In the summer of 1838 Tupper penned a continuation of Samuel Taylor Coleridge's Christabel, naming it Geraldine and publishing it alongside various other pieces in the latter half of that year in the collection Geraldine, a sequel to Coleridge's Christabel: with other poems. The poem Geraldine itself met with some critical reprobation, although in his contemporary notes Tupper attributes this largely to it being a continuation of an early version of Coleridge's poem: "When Coleridge first published Christabel ... it was positively hooted by the critics ... Coleridge left behind him a very much improved and enlarged version of the poem, which I did not see till years after I had written the sequel to it: my Geraldine was composed for an addition to Christabel, as originally issued." The other poems in the collection were more warmly received.

=== Proverbial Philosophy ===
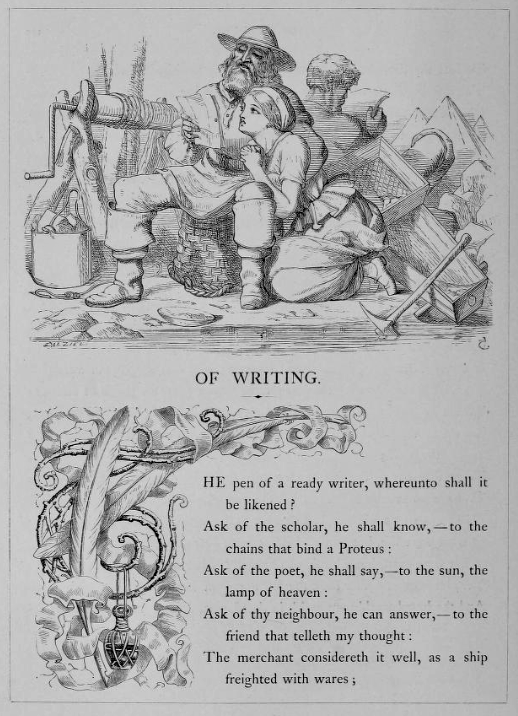
The first page of "Of Writing" from the first illustrated edition. Illustrations by John Tenniel.

Tupper's most successful work had its genesis in 1828, shortly before his Oxford matriculation. At this time he was engaged to Isabella, and he decided to write his "notions on the holy estate of matrimony" for her, "in the manner of Solomon's proverbs". Isabella showed them to Hugh M'Neile, who suggested seeking publication, but Tupper chose not to do so at the time.

In 1837, on the encouragement of Henry Stebbing, Tupper began to revise these writings and expand them into a book, working on them at home and in his workplace, Lincoln's Inn, over the subsequent 10 weeks. The work takes the form of free verse meditations on morality ("Of Humility", "Of Pride"), religion ("Of Prayer", "The Train of Religion"), and other aspects of the human condition ("Of Love", "Of Joy"). Tupper did not refer to the pieces as poetry, preferring his own description of "rhythmics".

Stebbing referred Tupper to the publisher Joseph Rickerby, who agreed to publish the work on a profit-sharing basis, and this first official version appeared on 24 January 1838 entitled Proverbial Philosophy: A Book of Thoughts and Arguments, originally treated, by Martin Farquhar Tupper, Esq., M.A. at a price of 7s. It met with moderate success in Britain; a second edition was commissioned, to which Tupper added more material, and sold for 6s. A third edition emerged, but this failed to sell well; the unsold copies were sent to America, where it was received poorly. "Americans scarcely knew what to make of it at all; one of the few stateside reviewers to read Proverbial Philosophy, the powerful editor N.P. Willis, was so perplexed by the form of the book that he guessed it to have been written ... in the seventeenth century."

Introductory to the second series (excerpt)

Come again, and greet me as a friend, fellow-pilgrim upon life's highway,
Leave awhile the hot and dusty road, to loiter in the greenwood of Reflection.
Come unto my cool dim grotto, that is watered by the rivulet of truth,
And over whose time-stained rock clime the fairy flowers of content;
Here, upon the mossy bank of leisure fling thy load of cares,
Taste my simple store, and rest one soothing hour.

Behold, I would count thee for a brother, and commune with thy charitable soul;
Though wrapt within the mantle of a prophet, I stand mine own weak scholar.
Heed no disciple for a teacher, if knowledge be not found upon his tongue;
For vanity and folly were the lessons these lips untaught could give.

Despite the lack of interest in the third edition, in 1841 Tupper was spurred to write a second series of Proverbial Philosophy at the suggestion of John Hughes, who he had met in a chance encounter in Windsor two years previously. This series was to be serialised in the new publication Ainsworth's Magazine, William Harrison Ainsworth being a friend of Hughes. Tupper and his family temporarily moved to Brighton where he produced some initial pieces for the magazine, as well as some essays. However, being "too quick and too impatient to wait for piecemeal publication month by month", Tupper collated his new "rhythmics" and had the second series of Proverbial Philosophy published as a whole, on 5 October 1842 by John Hatchard.

The second series was sold alongside the fifth edition of the first series, and proved to be immediately popular. The two were soon combined into one collection, still entitled Proverbial Philosophy, and this iteration became an enormous success over the subsequent decades:

For an era of moralizing ... Tupper's truisms were a comforting balm. He was not a mad, bad, and dangerous-to-know Romantic poet; he could be safely pressed into the hands of any young person or spouse in need of Lessons in Life. During the 1840s and 1850s, Proverbial Philosophy appeared in a bewildering variety of guises — cheap reading editions, gilt gift books, even lavish presentation editions meant to be given to young couples on their wedding day. Copies were given on the birth of children, on anniversaries, on any occasion of importance at all.

In the 1850s the work was translated into several languages, including German, Swedish, Danish, Armenian, and a French version by George Métivier. By 1866 it had sold over 200,000 copies in the United Kingdom, through forty editions.

Tupper did go on to write a third and fourth series in 1867 and 1869 respectively, published by Edward Moxon in his Moxon's Popular Poets series (which had previously included luminaries such as Byron, Wordsworth, Coleridge, Keats and Milton). However, by this time Tupper had fallen out of fashion, and these latter series did not sell well. Moxon had already been in bad financial straits, and Tupper's new works did not change his fortunes; the publisher was shortly taken over.

Over the course of the author's lifetime it is estimated that between one quarter and half a million copies were sold in England, and over 1.5 million in the United States, across 50 editions. Due to the lack of international copyright laws, the US market was dominated by pirated copies; consequently, Tupper made almost no money from the work's enormous American sales. However, he did manage to capitalise on his fame in North America by undertaking two tours of the US and Canada, in 1851 and 1876-1877.

=== Candidate for Poet Laureate ===
Upon the death of William Wordsworth in 1850, Tupper began to suggest his willingness to fill the now-vacant position of Poet Laureate to influential friends and acquaintances such as William Gladstone and James Garbett, who further gathered support. He continued to write poems for public events in order to demonstrate his capability, marking occasions such as the deaths of Robert Peel and the Duke of Cambridge, as well as the Great Exhibition, for which he published Hymn to the Exhibition in over sixty languages (set to music by Samuel Sebastian Wesley). It appears that his candidacy had popular support, from both sides of the Atlantic. However, the eventual selection was Alfred, Lord Tennyson, partly due to Prince Albert's admiration of the poem In Memoriam A.H.H.

=== First tour of America ===
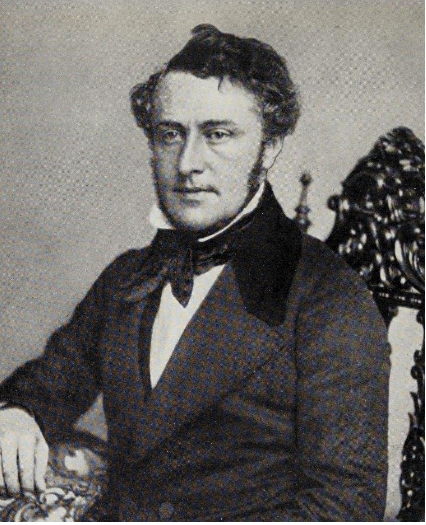
Image of Martin Farquhar Tupper during his first American tour (aged 40)

Despite making almost no money from his written works in North America, Tupper recognised the potential of his enormous popularity on the other side of the Atlantic. Having overcome his stammer at the age of 35, (Note: "I cured myself; ... God answered constant prayer, and granted stronger bodily health, and gave me good success in my literary life, and made me to feel I was equal in speech, as now, to the most fluent of my fellows") he embarked on a "wildly successful" reading tour of the Eastern USA and Canada, setting off from Liverpool on 2 March 1851 and landing in New York City two weeks later. His arrival was announced in American newspapers, and while based in the city he met a variety of literary figures including William Cullen Bryant, Nathaniel Parker Willis, James Gordon Bennett Sr., James Fenimore Cooper, and Washington Irving. He was generally warmly received by the people he met, although his tendency to quote his own poetry was "deemed unseemly at the time" and criticised in the press, as was his perceived "patronising attitude and sentimentalism" towards Americans.

An indication of Tupper's popularity in the US is given by his dealings with one of his publishers in Philadelphia:

Butler showed him part of a new book he had in the press, "The Proverbialist and the Poet" by James Orton, which even Tupper found somewhat embarrassing. It consisted of quotations from three authors – and "the three authors, I am ashamed to say ... are Solomon!— Shakespeare!— and Martin F. Tupper!" [...] The frontispiece and title-page contained illustrations of Solomon's temple, [...] [Tupper's home] Albury House, and Shakespeare's birthplace at Stratford. Adulation could hardly go further.

The highlight of the American tour was a dinner at the White House on 8 May with President Millard Fillmore and members of his cabinet, Fillmore himself being an admirer of the poet. In his autobiography Tupper quotes his contemporaneous notes:

President Fillmore invited me to meet his Cabinet at dinner in the White House, and that I there "met and conversed immensely with Daniel Webster, a colossal unhappy beetle-browed dark-angel-looking sort of man, with a depth for good and evil in his eye unfathomable; also with Home Secretary Corwen [sic], a coarse but clever man, who had been a waggon-driver; and with Graham, Secretary of the Navy, and with Conrad, Secretary at War, both gentlemen and having lofty foreheads; and with many more, including above all the excellent President," &c. &c. It was no small honour to meet such men on equal terms.

After stops in Pittsburgh and Philadelphia, Tupper returned to New York, where he was noticed in a concert crowd by its promoter P. T. Barnum and brought backstage to meet Jenny Lind. The Swedish Nightingale was an admirer - "she sat holding Tupper's hand and crying with emotion while the management of the theatre frantically tried to get her on stage for a bow." He set off on his return trip to Liverpool on 24 May 1851, seen off by a group of admirers and "regretful paragraphs" in the New York newspapers.

=== Middle years ===
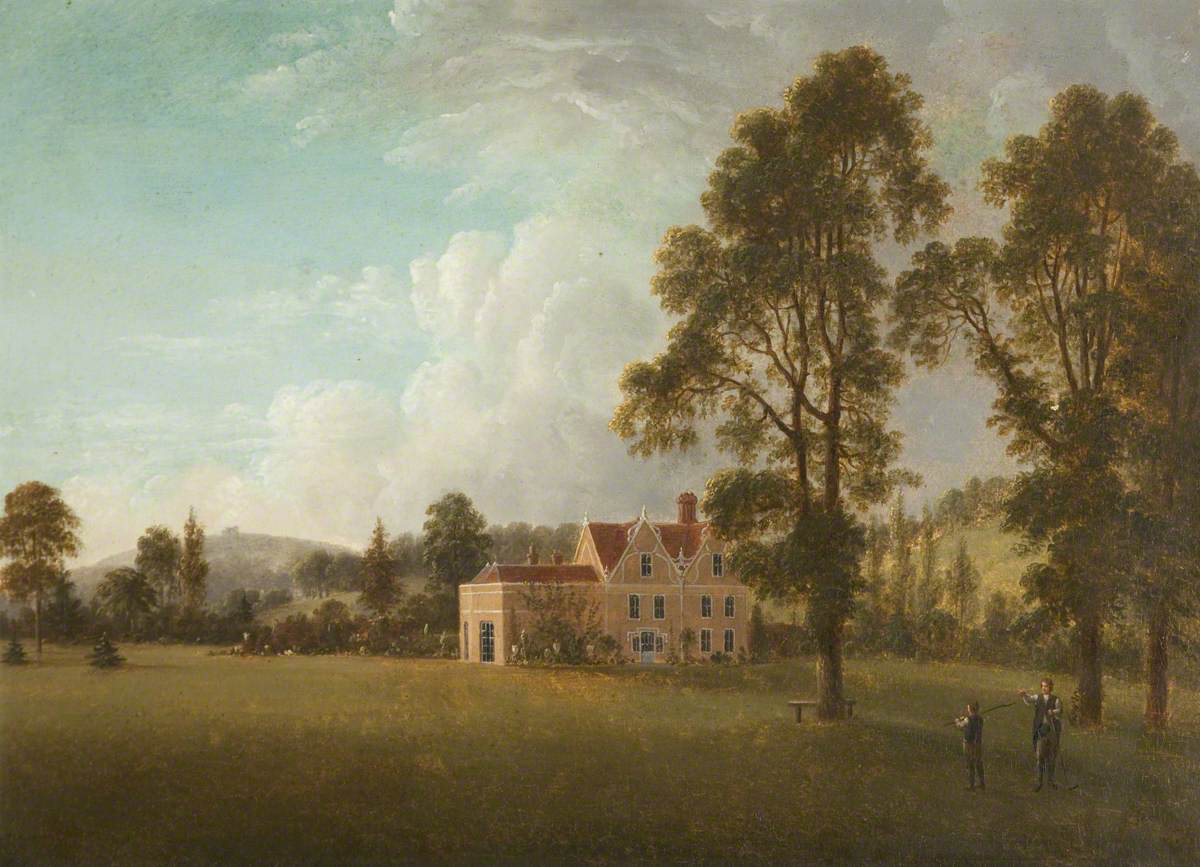
Albury House in 1792

By 1851 Tupper had fathered eight children, and had moved his large family into the spacious Albury House in Albury, Surrey approximately ten years previously. (Note: Not to be confused with Albury Park Mansion, this was a house bought by Anthony Devis in 1780 and eventually passed down to Isabella.) However, his financial position became precarious by the mid-1850s. His wife Isabella had fallen ill, and he wrote to Gladstone (then Chancellor of the Exchequer) to request an office or public pension, to no avail. (Note: Tupper eventually received a civil list pension in 1873.) His eldest son, Martin Charles Selwyn (born 1841), was made the youngest Captain in the British Army by purchase in 1864, but it fell upon his father to settle his many drinking and gambling debts, and fund a spell in an asylum in St John's Wood, until he was relocated to Rio de Janeiro in 1868. (Note: Captain Tupper died eleven years later, back in London, of typhoid fever or cholera.) These financial strains were compounded by a series of poor investments. Tupper managed to stay afloat by continuing to publish poetry, and bringing out new editions of Proverbial Philosophy, including an illustrated version, but he was compelled to let out Albury House from 1867 to generate additional income.

Tupper was already a favourite poet of Queen Victoria, and in June 1857, having written sonnets for each of the engaged couple Victoria, Princess Royal and Prince Frederick, was granted the honour of being "summoned to Buckingham Palace, to be received by the Queen herself and Prince Albert, and to present special copies of 'Proverbial Philosophy' with his own hands to the young betrothed." The circumstances of this audience were highly unusual, as Tupper was instructed to meet the Royal Family on a Sunday after church – "the Royal Family had never entertained a private individual in this way since George III had summoned Dr Johnson." (Note: Presumably 1767: Johnson's "being honoured by a private conversation with his Majesty, in the library at the Queen's house.") Tupper's work was already well known to the family, having been appreciated by the children's governess and their drawing master Edward Henry Corbould (who also happened to be Tupper's friend), and he had written pieces for the children to perform for their parents previously.

Tupper continued to write poetry for periodicals and publications of his own work, but none of these came close to the popularity of Proverbial Philosophy. By the mid-1860s he and his work were being persistently satirised by a new generation of Victorians, the victims of changing tastes (see § Proverbial Philosophy in later years).

=== British and second American tours ===
Deciding to focus on readings of his works instead of continuing to pen new material to be satirised or ignored, Tupper began touring south-west England in April 1873. These events were somewhat popular, although apart from the "fair-sized audiences, largely composed of ladies" there were also "many who only came to satisfy themselves that such a fabulous being as Martin Tupper really existed". The most popular of his works were "Love" and "Marriage" from Proverbial Philosophy, as well as the poems "Never Give Up" and "All's for the Best". Later in the year he also toured Scotland, to a warmer reception.

After his Scottish success, Tupper decided to undertake a second American tour; delayed by illness, he arrived in October 1876 and stayed in New York as the guest of Thomas De Witt Talmage, an admirer of Proverbial Philosophy. Much like in Britain, this tour was filled with public readings of his works; while his American popularity had also declined, it was not to the extent that it had in his home country, and he delivered a reading of "Immortality" to his largest-ever audience, between five and six thousand – the congregation of Talmage's church. However, Tupper often failed to attract large crowds on the merit of his readings alone; he performed to several thousand at one event in Philadelphia, but only a few hundred at various events in New York State and Canada. After the huge success of his first American tour, this one "proved a pale shadow". Nevertheless, it was profitable, and his stature was such that he was invited to the inauguration and White House reception of President Hayes.

== Later life and death ==
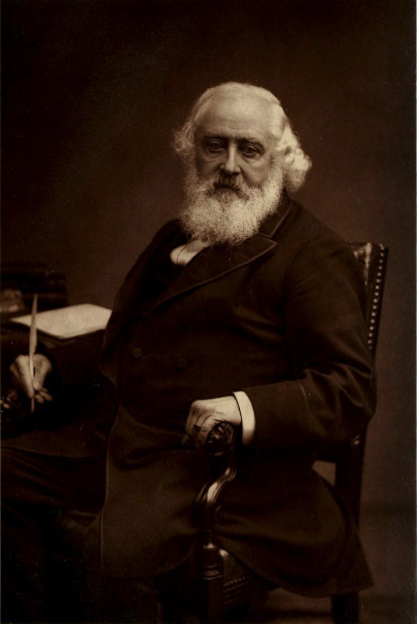
Photograph of Martin Farquhar Tupper from his 1886 autobiography

By the time of his return from his second American tour on 16 April 1877, Tupper had fallen into obscurity in his home country. His attempts to publish a complete collection of his works failed; each of the 26 publishers he approached had declined. Continually short of money, in 1880 was obliged to mortgage his longtime home of Albury House to the Duke of Northumberland. He and his family moved to a small rental property in Upper Norwood.

Tupper made a final attempt at a new printing of Proverbial Philosophy in 1881, a large illustrated quarto, but this failed to sell. He continued to write articles and plays, managing to publish Dramatic Pieces in 1882, and he also delivered occasional lectures and readings. Around this time he and Gladstone, friends since childhood, fell out over Gladstone's views on the circumstances that led to the Oaths Act 1888, and his refusal to continue to support the author financially.

In late 1885 Tupper started to write an autobiography, which was published in May 1886 under the title My Life as an Author. His wife Isabella had died during its composition, in December 1885, from apoplexy, and he included a tribute to her in the work. It received fairly warm reviews, but never ran to a second edition, despite the author working on improvements and corrections after publication.

Tupper's last published work was the booklet "Jubilate!", which contained new poems for the Golden Jubilee of Queen Victoria as well as the work he had written in honour of her coronation fifty years earlier.

In November 1886 Tupper suffered an illness of several days which robbed him of the ability to read and write. He remained in a fragile state for his remaining three years, being cared for by his children, never learning that during that period Albury House had been foreclosed by the Duke of Northumberland. Eventually he died, on 29 November 1889, and was buried in Albury churchyard in the same grave as his wife and son Martin Charles Selwyn, with an epitaph reading "He being dead yet speaketh".

== Personal beliefs ==
=== Religion ===
Tupper was a passionate lifelong Protestant:

Ever since in my boyhood, under the ministerial teaching of my rector, the celebrated Hugh M'Neile, at Albury for many years, I closed with the Evangelical religion of the good old Low Church type, I have by my life and writings excited against me the theological hatred of High Church, and Broad Church, and No Church, and especially of the Romanizers amongst our Established clergy.

The contrast between his beliefs and those of his close friend William Gladstone, who was raised Evangelical but sympathised with the Oxford Movement later in life, became a frequent source of friction between the two. Tupper at one point challenged him with the question "are you a hearty friend of the Protestant Reformation?", and the difference of views was a contributing factor to their eventual falling out.

Tupper's religion played a large role in his works, both in terms of the genesis and reception of Proverbial Philosophy ("There was room for a work of moral principle, and of Evangelical temper, that would have a wide appeal"), as well as later in life, when he wrote "extreme Protestant ballads" for the Church of England paper The Rock. Additionally, he was an early supporter of the Student Volunteer Movement, which was founded to encourage missionary work abroad.

=== Colonialism ===
During a time of increasing concern about the state of the British Empire's military forces, Tupper was a key voice in creating the Volunteer Force, a movement which bolstered the army and helped lead to its professionalisation; he himself became the secretary of the "Blackheath Rifles" in 1859. He wrote jingoistic poems in support of the allied troops in the Crimean War and, controversially, urging severe punishment of those responsible for the Indian Rebellion of 1857. His ballads in the Globe captured a popular mood of outrage at the delay in relief for General Gordon at the Siege of Khartoum, and earned the appreciation of Gordon's family.

=== Race and abolitionism ===
Tupper had an interest in the legacy of the Anglo-Saxons; he arranged an event to mark the thousandth anniversary of the birth of Alfred the Great in the king's birthplace of Wantage, and was an erstwhile contributor to the short-lived magazine Anglo-Saxon (1849-1851), which was "devoted to the cause of friendship between the English-speaking peoples". However, this interest has overtones of racial superiority, as evinced by his 1850 ballad "The Anglo-Saxon Race": "Break forth and spread over every place / The world is a world for the Anglo Saxon race!". Critic Kwame Anthony Appiah argues that Tupper's views on race were informed and limited by their time, quoting this poem as an example of the predominant colonialist understanding of "race" in the nineteenth century. Appia calls Tupper a "racialist": "He believed, as did most educated Victorians by the mid-century, that we could divide human beings into a small number of groups, called "races," in such a way that all members of these races shared certain fundamental ... characteristics with each other that they did not share with members of any other race."

Tupper was a proponent of abolitionism. While studying at Oxford he refused to eat sugar "by way of somehow discouraging the slave trade", and in 1848 he wrote a national anthem for Liberia and advocated for the republic in communications with Lord Palmerston and President Fillmore. He received presidents Roberts and Benson in his home as they came to thank him for his support. In addition he created a specific prize in order to encourage African literature, "biennially to be competed for by emancipated slaves".

Regarding the American Civil War, however, he was not entirely supportive of the anti-slavery Union. While he wrote to President Lincoln in May 1861 with the sentiment "May this Revolution bear the good fruit of total abolition of slavery all over the American continent ...!" and to Gladstone that "The South are responsible for this civil war", his later works demonstrate a sympathy for the Southern cause. During his second American tour, Tupper published a sympathetic "Ode to the South", beginning

The world has misjudged you, mistrusted, maligned you,
And should be quick to make honest amends;
Let me then speak of you just as I find you,
Humbly and heartily, cousins and friends!
Let us remember your wrongs and your trials,
Slander'd and plunder'd and crush'd to the dust,
Draining adversity's bitterest vials,
Patient in courage and strong in good trust.

Tupper's autobiography, written towards the very end of his life, recounts visiting a formerly slave-owning friend during the same tour:

I next paid a visit on my old Brook Green school-friend, Middleton, at his burnt and ruined mansion near Summerville: once a wealthy and benevolent patriarch, surrounded by a negro population who adored him, all being children of the soil, and not one slave having been sold by him or his ancestors for 200 years. According to him, that violent emancipation was ruin all round: in his own case a great farm of happy dependants was destroyed, the inhabitants all dead through disease and starvation, a vast estate once well tilled reverted to marsh and jungle, and himself and his reduced to utter poverty,—all mainly because Mrs. Beecher Stowe had exaggerated isolated facts as if they were general, (Note: Tupper had met Stowe when she travelled to England to lecture on slavery in 1853. She admired his poetry, but he "was critical of Mrs Stowe, whom he declared 'too taciturn ... to realise one's expectation of a famous lioness.' When her book on Byron [Lady Byron Vindicated: A History Of The Byron Controversy] enraged [Byron's] sympathisers in 1869, Tupper attacked her in two of his most vehement poems.") and because North and South quarrelled about politics and protection. ... I lamented over the desolation of my friend's mansion and estate, and in particular to have seen how outrageously the Federals had destroyed his family-mausoleum, scattering the sacred relics of his ancestors all round and about. This was simply because he had been a Confederate magnate, and had owned patriarchally a multitude of slaves, born on the spot through two centuries. He and his kind brother, the Admiral,—my friendly host at Washington,—have joined the majority elsewhere; but I heard from him and others down South the truth about American slavery.

== Legacy ==
Tupper had no doubts as to his place in the pantheon of English literature. As Murphy (1937) notes, the closing lines of his autobiography are a confident indication of this, quoting from the epilogue of Ovid's Metamorphoses:

Now have I done my work: which not Jove's ire
Can make undone, nor sword nor time nor fire.
...
My name shall never die, but through all time
Whenever Rome shall reach a conquer'd clime,
There, in that people's tongue, shall this my page
Be read and glorified from age to age:—
Yea, if the bodings of my spirit give
True note of inspiration, I shall live! (Note: This is an original translation by Tupper, so may differ from other translations of the work.)

=== Proverbial Philosophy in later years ===
Having enjoyed huge success for almost two decades, by the end of the 1850s Proverbial Philosophy started to fall out of favour in Britain as tastes and social attitudes changed. The first sign of this was an article by the influential National Review in its 1858 article "Charlatan Poetry: Martin Farquhar Tupper". Acknowledging that the poet's popularity was "one of the most unquestionable facts of the day ... We are quite aware that it would be utterly beyond our strength to displace him from his stronghold in public favour", the article proceeds with a lengthy criticism of his poetry: "[we] belong to that small but respectable minority who regard Mr. Tupper's versicular philosophy as superficial and conceited twaddle".

Although it remained popular for many years, the ultimate challenge to the work's further longevity was that Proverbial Philosophy presents a style and viewpoint that are inextricably linked and of interest only to those who lived during the early-to-mid Victorian period. In his biography of Tupper, Hudson (1949) contends that "the success of 'Proverbial Philosophy' ... sprang primarily from the moral and religious movement of early Victorian days which gradually lost its impetus as the reign proceeded. It was the belief that art must be linked with morality that furthered the astonishing advance of Tupper's book". Dingley (2004) agrees: "He presented as vatic wisdom the established convictions of his readership, which responded by venerating him as a sage. But as those convictions themselves began to crumble in the 1860s, under the pressure of scientific advance and social change, so Tupper’s status declined and he came to seem an embarrassing survival from a superseded past, a victim of the progress he had so earnestly celebrated." Collins (2002) adds that the work was a victim of its own success: "The children who had once received gift book editions of Tupper for their birthdays were heartily sick of the man." As a piece of art that spoke only to people of its own time, the work has never experienced a revival of interest: "It put the weight of tradition and common sense behind social values and interpretations which were in reality peculiar to Victorianism."

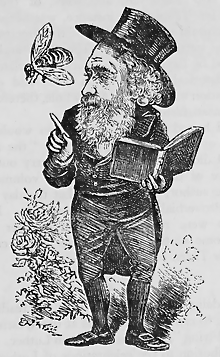
Caricature of Martin F. Tupper published in Moonshine (1883)

Given that Proverbial Philosophy was published by the author when he was a young man, who went on to live a long life and write prolifically, he was an easy target for satire from new generations and changing tastes – "Tupper's visage was everywhere ... His very generosity and omnipresence worked against him. By the 1870s, each week began to bring fresh pummelings by clever young men in humor magazines like Punch, Figaro and The Comic." Hudson (1949) quotes examples dating from 1864:

In a spoof series of literary announcements, "Philerbial Provosophy, by M. F. Tupper, A.S.S." is published by "I. Dyott, Colney Hatch"; while a series of alleged testimonials to patent medicines includes: "No. 101,486—M. F. Tupper, Esq., poet, of confirmed vacuity of mind, wandering thoughts, and general softness of brain. An almost hopeless case." ... "What's the difference between Tupper's stuff and pork stuffing?" asks another hack. "The one is good enough for the sage's saws, and the other for sausages." "To dream that you have written all Mr Tupper's Works (and on waking to find you haven't) is very lucky," declares "Professor Punch's Dream-Book". Another paper says that it is forbidden to bring Tupper's works or Parliamentary Blue-books aboard a steamboat, as their "excessive weight" made them dangerous to passengers. And so it goes on, and on, and on...

Once the satire was played out, Tupper's work was forgotten. As of 2002, none of his works have been in print since the final edition of Proverbial Philosophy in 1881, although digital transcriptions and facsimiles can now be found.

=== Influence on Walt Whitman ===
Renowned American poet Walt Whitman was an enthusiastic supporter of Tupper while acting as editor for the Brooklyn Eagle (1846–1848) – for example, in his 1847 review of Probabilities: An Aid to Faith he commends the work's "lofty ... august scope of intention! ... The author ... is one of the rare men of the time. He turns up thoughts as with a plough ... we should like well to go into this book ... but justice to it would require many pages." Contemporary readers noted similarities between Proverbial Philosophy and Whitman's writings (not always intending this to be a flattering comparison), and it seems likely that the work influenced the style of Whitman's Leaves of Grass, although the two had many ideological differences. Coulombe (1996) suggests that Whitman also

probably saw Tupper as both a positive and negative example of how a poet 'secures success.' Tupper's trip was essentially an effort to publicize his Complete Works. His impetuosity is echoed in Whitman's well-known efforts to promote himself. Both poets reveal an intrepid determination to gain popular recognition and success

In later years, however, Whitman distanced himself from Tupper; Tupper had by then become highly unfashionable, and Whitman was seeking to create a separate style of art for the New World: "His disagreement with Tupper, who considered the States as a literary adjunct to England, underscores his desire to create a distinctly American poetry." The influence from Britain continued, however, as Snodgrass (2008) notes that Whitman's style in later works such as Out of the Cradle Endlessly Rocking "was less influenced by homiletic writers such as Martin Tupper in favor of the more musical efforts of such poets as Tennyson."

=== In other literature ===
W. S. Gilbert alludes to Tupper in Bab Ballads. In the poem Ferdinando and Elvira, or, The Gentle Pieman (c. 1866), Gilbert describes how two lovers are trying to find out who has been putting mottoes into "paper crackers" (a sort of 19th Century fortune cookie). Gilbert builds up to the following lines, eventually coming up with a spoof of Tupper's own style from Proverbial Philosophy:

"Tell me, Henry Wadsworth, Alfred, Poet Close, or Mister Tupper,
Do you write the bon-bon mottoes my Elvira pulls at supper?"
But Henry Wadsworth smiled, and said he had not had that honour;
And Alfred, too disclaimed the words that told so much upon her.
"Mister Martin Tupper, Poet Close, I beg of you inform us;"
But my question seemed to throw them both into a rage enormous.
Mister Close expressed a wish that he could only get anigh to me;
And Mr. Martin Tupper sent the following reply to me:
"A fool is bent upon a twig, but wise men dread a bandit,"—
Which I know was very clever; but I didn't understand it. (Note: The three other references are Henry Wadsworth Longfellow, Lord Tennyson and John Close.)

Such was Tupper's fame that the 1933 Oxford English Dictionary contains an entry Tupperian: "Of, belonging to, or in the style of Martin F. Tupper's Proverbial Philosophy", or "An admirer of Tupper. So Tupperish a., Tupperism, Tupperize v.". The entry attests references dating from 1858.

== Awards and recognition ==
On 10 April 1845 Tupper was elected a Fellow of the Royal Society on merit of being "the author of 'Proverbial Philosophy' and several other works", and "eminent as a literary Man, and for his Archaeological attainments". (Note: At the time, the Royal Society was "open to anyone 'eminently distinguished in one of the learned professions'", as opposed to its modern narrower remit of the sciences.) A key contribution to archaeology was his excavation of Farley Heath on Farley Green, Surrey, done piecemeal at periods between 1839 and 1847, and as an organised project in 1848, which uncovered a Romano-Celtic temple as well as a number of "coins, brooches and other metal objects". Tupper's interpretation of what he found, however, was of questionable accuracy.

He received the 1844 Gold Medal for Science and Literature from the King of Prussia as a mark of the King's admiration for Proverbial Philosophy.

== Selected works ==
- Sacra Poesis (1832)
- "A Voice from the Cloister" (1835)
- Geraldine (1838)
- Proverbial Philosophy (1838, 1842, 1867, 1869)
- A Modern Pyramid (1839)
- An Author's Mind (1841)
- The Crock of Gold (1844)
- Heart (1844)
- A Thousand Lines (1844)
  - "The Song of Seventy"
  - "Never Give Up"
- The Twins (1844)
- Probabilities: An Aid to Faith (1847)
- "A Loving Ballad to Brother Jonathan" (1848)
- "A Prayer for the Land" (1848)
- Hactenus (1848)
  - "The Dead"
- A Railway Glance at the County of Surrey (1849)
- Alfred, the Great, King of England: King Alfred's Poems (1850)
- "The Anglo-Saxon Race" (1850)
- Complete Poetical Works (1850)
- Complete Prose Works (1850)
- "Hymn to the Exhibition" (1850)
- Ballads for the Times (1851)
- The Complete Works of Martin F. Tupper (1851)
- "A Hymn for All Nations" (1851)
- "Niagara" (1851)
- "A Dirge for Wellington" (1852)
- "Things to Come: A Prophetic Ode" (1852)
- Half-a-dozen Ballads about Australia (1853)
- War Ballads (1854)
- Lyrics of the Heart and Mind (1855)
- "The Atlantic Telegraph" (1856)
- Paterfamilias's Diary of Everybody's Tour (1856)
- Alfred: A Patriotic Play, in Five Acts (1858)
- Stephen Langton, or, The Last Days of King John (1858)
- The Rides and Reveries of the Late Mr Aesop Smith (1858)
- Rifle Ballads (1859)
- Three Hundred Sonnets (1860)
- Cithara (1863)
- "A Lyric of Congratulation" (1864)
- "Shakspeare: An Ode For His Three-Hundredth Birthday" (1864)
- "Ode to the South" (1871)
- Protestant Ballads (1874)
- Washington: A Drama, in Five Acts (1876)
- Three Five-Act Plays (1882)
- My Life as an Author (1886)
- "Jubilate!" (1886)
