= Martin Tupper (physician) =

English physician (1780–1844)

Martin Tupper, FRS, FGS (17 April 1780 – 8 December 1844) was an English physician originally from Guernsey. The son of John Tupper and Catherine Bowden, he became a respected medical doctor whose patients included the Duke of Wellington.

== Education and career ==
Tupper attended Exeter College, Oxford, matriculating on 15 January 1802, but left two years later without achieving a degree. As well as becoming a Fellow of the Medical and Chirurgical Society of London in 1819 he was an amateur geologist and a Fellow of the Geological Society. He was also elected a Fellow of the Royal Society in February 1835.

== Personal life ==
Tupper married Ellin Devis Marris, the daughter of landscape painter Robert Marris (1749–1827) and granddaughter of Arthur Devis, on 7 August 1809. They had five sons, including the poet Martin Farquhar Tupper.

== Death ==
He died in 1844 at South Hill Park, the Berkshire home of the dying Edmund Pery, 1st Earl of Limerick, while attending him in a medical capacity.
