= David Fulton =

David Fulton may refer to:

- David Fulton (English cricketer) (born 1971), British cricketer
- David Fulton (New Zealand cricketer) (born 1983), New Zealand cricketer
- David Bryant Fulton (1863–1941) American writer
- David C. Fulton (1838–1899), Wisconsin legislator
- David L. Fulton (born 1944), American musician, computer scientist, violinist and collector of rare instruments

== See also ==
- David Fulton Publishers, a British publishing house
