= Gregory Normal School =

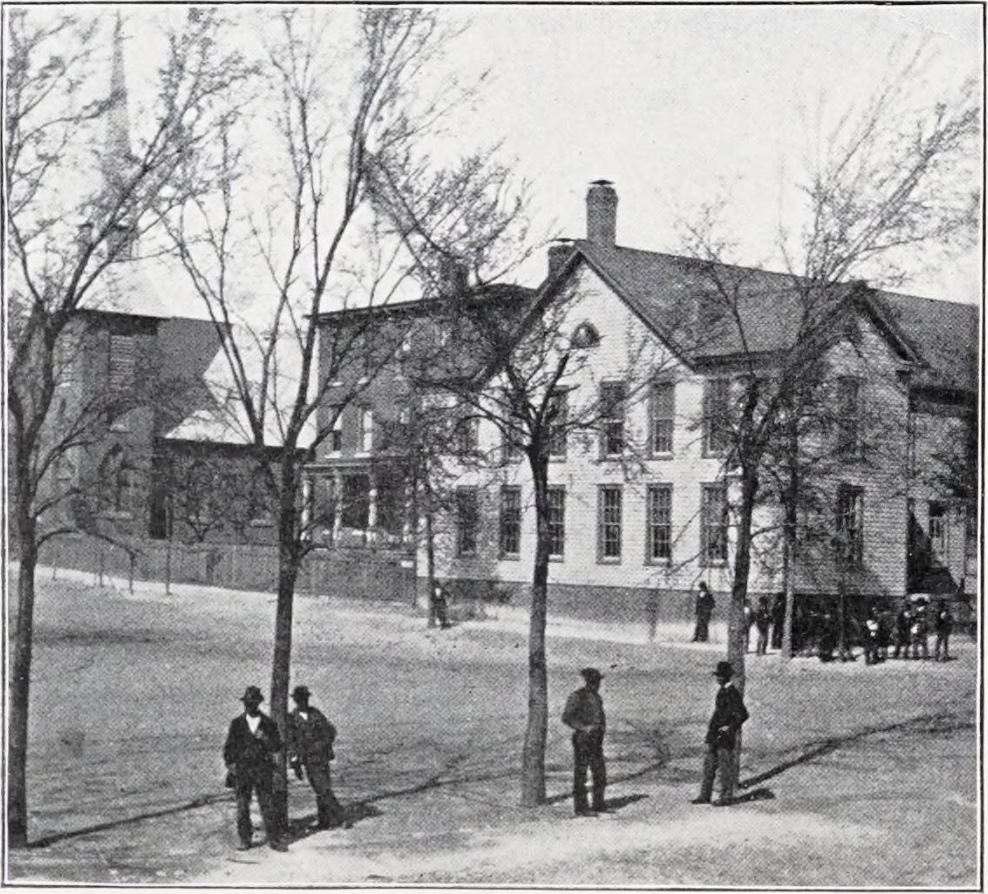
The school's campus, c. 1910

Gregory Normal School was an American segregated high school in Wilmington, North Carolina for African American students, that operated from 1868 to 1921. It was the first school admitting African American students in Wilmington after the American Civil War. It had been named the Wilmington Normal School, and the Gregory Normal Institute.

== History ==
Originally known as Wilmington Normal School when it was organized by a group of eight Protestant missionaries from New England who were sponsored by the American Missionary Association, it was a high school-level school that sought to prepare its students for studying in colleges and universities elsewhere.

It was renamed the Gregory Normal Institute in 1883 in honor of James J. H. Gregory of Marblehead, Massachusetts, who made a substantial donation to the school's operations.

In 1921, the classes ceased at this site. The Gregory Congregational Church (now Gregory Congregational United) that stood next to the school is still active. A public elementary school located a few blocks away from the former site is named the Gregory School.

== Alumni ==
- George E. Davis, professor at Biddle University and later supervisor of Rosenwald School building in North Carolina
- Addie Whiteman Dickerson (1878–1940), businessperson, politician, clubwoman, suffragist, and peace activist
- David Bryant Fulton, writer
- Caroline Sadgwar Manly, one of the Fisk Jubilee Singers, and wife of Alexander Manly
- Bertha McNeill (1887–1979), activist and educator

== Additional sources ==
- History of Education in North Carolina, p. 329
