= Dorothy Cowser Yancy =

American academic, born 1944

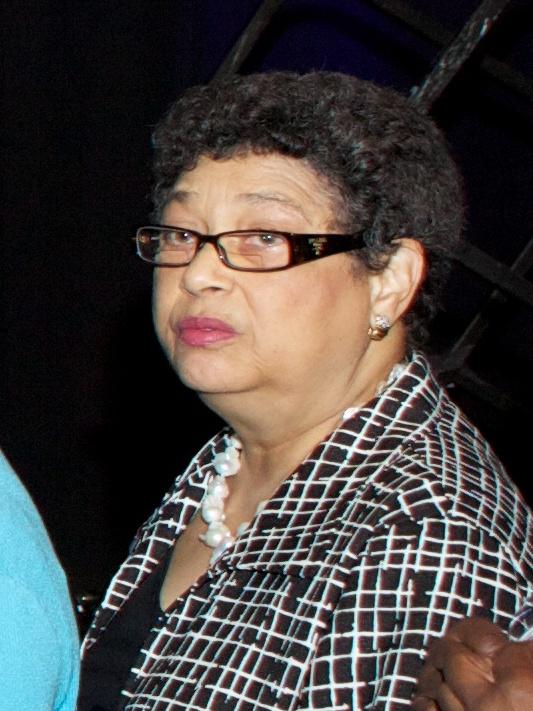
- Pictured at the 2014 HBCU National Conference.

16th President of Shaw University
- In office September 2011 – December 2013
- Preceded by: Irma McClaurin
- Succeeded by: Gaddis Faulcon

14th President of Shaw University
- In office June 2009 – September 2010
- Preceded by: Clarence G. Newsome
- Succeeded by: Irma McClaurin

12th President of Johnson C. Smith University
- In office October 1994 – June 2008
- Preceded by: Robert Albright
- Succeeded by: Ronald L. Carter

Personal details
- Born: Dorothy Cowser; April 18, 1944 (age 82) Cherokee County, Alabama
- Spouse: Robert James Yancy (m. 1994; div. 1999)
- Children: Yvonne Cowser Yancy
- Parents: Howard Cowser (father); Linnie Bell Covington Cowser (mother)
- Education: Johnson C. Smith University (BA); University of Massachusetts (MA); Atlanta University (PhD)
- Occupation: Professor, academic, and university administrator

Dorothy Cowser Yancy (born April 18, 1944) is an American academic, professor, and administrator. Her contributions to academia established her legacy of scholarship among African-American women. During college, Yancy participated in civil rights organizations, earned several degrees, including a Ph.D. in political science, and completed the Fulbright Program. She went on to teach at the School of Social Sciences at Georgia Institute of Technology, becoming the first African-American to become a tenured full professor. She left Georgia Tech in 1994 to become the president of Johnson C. Smith University, in Charlotte, North Carolina. In 2009, Yancy became the 14th president of Shaw University and was elected to the position again in 2011 as the 16th president. She received many awards and honors for her dedication to higher education.

== Early life ==
Dorothy Cowser Yancy was born on April 18, 1944, and raised alongside her 3 siblings on their family-owned farm in Cherokee County, Alabama, to parents Howard Cowser and Linnie Bell Covington Cowser. Her parents did not complete school, but they encouraged all of their children to get college degrees. After graduating from the segregated Hatcher High School in 1960, Yancy matriculated to Johnson C. Smith University (JCSU) in Charlotte, North Carolina.

While attending JCSU, she was an active member of the Southern Christian Leadership Conference, Student Nonviolent Coordinating Committee, and the Student Government Association. Yancy also joined Alpha Kappa Alpha, the first historically African-American Greek-lettered sorority. In addition to these groups, she was a participant in the civil rights movement in North Carolina, attending protests in the area.

Originally intending to become a research chemist, Yancy would later discover a passion for history and go on to receive a Master of Arts in History from the University of Massachusetts in 1965, while studying to receive a management development certificate from Harvard University. In 1978, she earned her Ph.D. in political science from Atlanta University on the same weekend as her daughter's kindergarten graduation.

== Career ==
Yancy served as instructor of history at Albany State College in Albany, Georgia, from 1965 to 1967. She continued teaching history at Hampton Institute in Hampton, Virginia, as an instructor from 1965 to 1967. From 1971-1972, Yancy served as director of the Afro-American Studies program at Barat College in Lake Forest, Illinois. In 1972, Yancy moved to the Georgia Institute of Technology where she served as professor of history, technology and society and in the School of Management. Yancy became Georgia Tech's first African-American full professor. In 1988 and 1990, she assisted with labor delegations for the Soviet Union as well as Europe.

In 1994, Yancy became interim president at Johnson C. Smith University, making her the university's first woman president. At JCSU, she helped rebuild Biddle Hall and raised over $145 million for the university, which contributed to her recognition as a financial champion for Historically Black Colleges and Universities (HBCUs). Yancy also started the technology program and in 2000 testified before Congress about technology's importance in higher education. Through her work, applications to JCSU increased, and the United Negro College Fund Technology Initiative was able to lease laptops, computer servers, and hardware for the university through the IBM ThinkPad program. As of 2003, the only historically black institution in the IBM ThinkPad program was Johnson C. Smith University.

Yancy became the first female member of the Central Intercollegiate Athletic Association board (CIAA) and served as its first woman president. She compared her work in the CIAA to being a member of a basketball team where she and the other members must work together for the board to function.

Yancy retired from JCSU in 2008 and began to work with the Federal Mediation and Conciliation Service as an arbitrator and as a consultant in higher education. Yancy appeared before the Committee on Education and Labor on March 13, 2008, to discuss HBCUs, in particular Johnson C. Smith University, and the importance of university funding from the government. In 2009, Yancy became the 14th president of Shaw University and was named to that position again in 2011, after a tornado damaged the campus. During her final tenure at Shaw, she helped the school get five accreditation reviews.

In 2017, she was appointed as senior adviser to the Morehouse College interim president, Harold Martin Jr. by the Morehouse Board of Trustees. Yancy also worked at the Florida Public Employee Relations Commission as Special Master, being the first African American to serve in this position. Throughout her career, she has written more than 40 articles for academic journals such as the Journal of Negro Education and the Labor Studies Journal.

== Honors ==
Throughout her career, she has garnered multiple awards and honors. Yancy received Outstanding Teacher of the Year from the Georgia Institute of Technology in 1985. In 1988, Newsweek on Campus named her one of the six best teachers in the United States. Yancy was honored in 1980 and 1987 as Who's Who Among African American Women. In 2001, the U.S. Department of State honored Dr. Yancy for being an African American Fulbright Scholar Alumna, after she completed the exchange program in Singapore. One year later in 2002, she was inducted into the Delta of Georgia Chapter of Phi Beta Kappa.

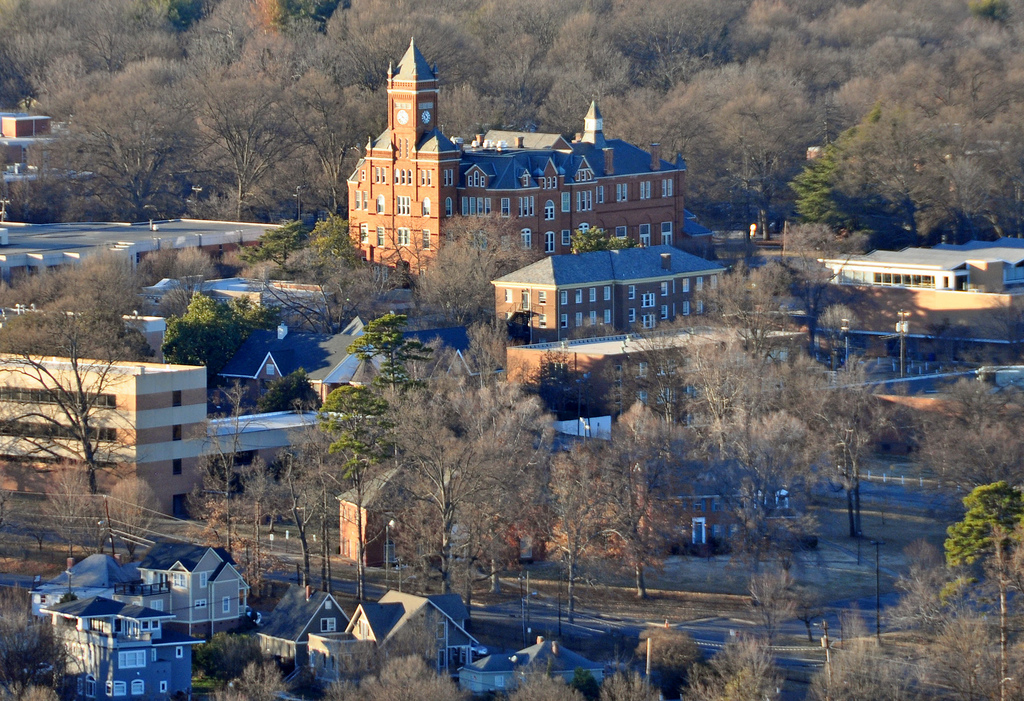
Skyline view of Johnson C. Smith University where the Dorothy Cowser Yancy Hall is located.

Yancy received the Honorary Alumni Award by the Georgia Tech Alumni Association in 2011. In 2013, she received the Dr. Dorothy I. Height Leadership Award and was listed in the Hall of Fame in Education in "The Atlanta Tribune". The following year she received the Co-Founders Links Award of the 39th Links Assembly. In 2015, WSB-TV recognized her as "a pioneer in higher education". That same year, an information technology building at JCSU was named after her. During a CIAA tournament in 2018, Yancy was recognized by CIAA commissioner, Katrice A. Albert, for her contributions to education and the community.

== Personal life ==
During her time in high school, Yancy was a member of the varsity basketball team. In 1974, she married Robert James Yancy, who she divorced 25 years later. She has one daughter named Yvonne, her namesake. Yancy now owns the family farm she was raised on and leases it to her brother. In her spare time, she loves to garden, cook, and travel.

== Works cited ==
- Bates, Gerri (Summer 2007). "These Hallowed Halls: African American Women College and University Presidents". Journal of Negro Education. 76 (3): 373–390. JSTOR 40034579.
- "Contemporary Black Biography". Encyclopedia.com.
- Dodd, Aileen (June 26, 2017). "Morehouse Board of Trustees Appoints New Interim President". PR Newswire.
- "Dorothy Cowser Yancy Honored by Johnson C. Smith University". The Journal of Blacks in Higher Education. April 4, 2015.
- "Dr. Dorothy Cowser Yancy of Johnson C. Smith & Shaw University to be honored in 2018 CIAA Hall of Fame". The Tom Joyner Foundation.
- Espinosa, Lorelle L.; Jackson, Leigh Miles; McGuire, Kent, eds. (2019). Minority Serving Institutions: America's Underutilized Resource for Strengthening the STEM Workforce. United States: National Academies Press. pp. 193–194. doi:10.17226/25257. ISBN 9780309484442. S2CID 169699591.
- Fields, Cheryl D. (August 29, 2002). "Secrets of the Presidential Turn Around Artist". Black Issues in Higher Education. 19 (14): 24.
- Gilbert, Marsha (February 2003). "The CIAA's President Of The Board". Ebony. Vol. 8, no. 54. Johnson Publishing Company. p. 100.
- Hawkins, Carol Hooks (2009). American Women Leaders. United States: McFarland Incorporated Publishers. p. 376. ISBN 9780786438471.
- Hayes, Dianne (February 28, 2013). "The Shoulders on Which We Stand". Diverse: Issues in Higher Education. 30 (2): 8–13.
- Huddleston, Dave (June 15, 2015). "Local leaders honor a pioneer in higher education". WSB-TV.
- Miller, George (March 13, 2008). "America's Black Colleges and Universities: Models of Excellence and Challenges For the Future". U.S. House of Representatives.
- "MLK Keynote Speaker 2020". Clemson University. 2020.
- Perlmutt, David (June 30, 2008). "Formidable leader bids JCSU farewell". The Charlotte Observer.
- Pluviose, David (June 26, 2008). "Presidential Memoirs". Diverse: Issues in Higher Education. 25 (10): 7.
- Smith, Jessie Carnie (December 2012). Black Firsts: 4,000 Ground-Breaking and Pioneering Historical Events. United Kingdom: Visible Ink Press. pp. 147–148. ISBN 9781578594252.
- Stearns, Catherine L. (February 28, 2001). "U.S. Department of State Recognizes Contributions of African-American Fulbright Program Alumni". U.S. Department of State.
- Sturdivant, Christina (March 31, 2014). "Simply Put, Dorothy Yancy Has a History of Leading the Way". Diverse Education.
- Wright, Mark W. (March 3, 2018). "CIAA shows love, respect to its 2018 Hall of Fame class". Andscape.
- Yancy, Dorothy Cowser (June 20, 2007). "The History Makers Video Oral History Interview with Dorothy Cowser Yancy" (Interview). Interviewed by Cheryl Butler. Charlotte, North Carolina.
- Yancy, Dorothy Cowser (May 19, 2009). "Dr. Dorothy Yancy". Georgia Tech Alumni Living History (Interview). Interviewed by Marilyn Somers. Georgia Tech Alumni Living History.
