= Jimmie McKee =

James Robert McKee (December 16, 1912, Charlotte, North Carolina – July 25, 1985) was an American night club owner.

McKee's parents died when he was fourteen forcing him to quit school and take care of his brothers and sisters. McKee married Minnie Jackson in 1939 and went to work as the head mail clerk with Horton Motor Lines. He also began tending bar at various restaurants around Charlotte, where he eventually got the idea to start the Excelsior Club, the first night club for African Americans in the Charlotte area.

In 1944 the first African American club became a reality when McKee bought a house on Beatties Ford Road. He renovated the house in new Art Moderne style complete with a dining and banquet room as well as a bar. The club became a favorite place for civil rights activists to meet during the 1950s and 1960s. The club hosted many famous musicians including Nat King Cole and local player Wilbert Harrison who started out at the Excelsior Club before rising to national fame. The club became the leading private black social club in the Southeast and the largest one on the East Coast.

Community leader "Genial Gene" Potts, the WGIV radio host, made the club his informal base of operations. A variety of men and women's social clubs also called the Excelsior home as well as African American fraternities and sororities.

After McKee started the club, he became a successful Charlotte businessman, contributing to Johnson C Smith University, NAACP, Colored NC Police Association, Democratic Party and YMCA. McKee was awarded man of the year in 1957 by the Charlotte Post newspaper.

McKee died from cancer on July 25, 1985 at the age of 72.

Upon his death Ken Koontz made sure the club continued. Representative William "Pete" Cunningham purchased the Club becoming the sole owner of the Historic Excelsior Club between 1988 and 2006. He sold it in 2006 to the civil rights attorney James Ferguson and his family bought the club and continues to run and maintain it. As of May 2017 the wife of former Rep. Pete Cunningham, Carla Cunningham has become the sole proprietor. The Club was designated as a historic property in 1986.
