= Spingarn Medal =

NAACP award for the highest achievement of an American of African descent

The Spingarn Medal is awarded annually by the National Association for the Advancement of Colored People (NAACP) for an outstanding achievement by an Black American. The award was created in 1914 by Joel Elias Spingarn, chairman of the board of directors of the NAACP. It was first awarded to biologist Ernest E. Just in 1915, and has been given most years thereafter.

At its annual convention, the NAACP presents the award after deciding from open nominations. Should the organization end, it would be managed by Howard or Fisk Universities. The gold medal is valued at $100, and Spingarn left $20,000 (equivalent to $463,000 in 2025) in his will for the NAACP to continue giving it indefinitely.

== List of recipients ==
Year	Picture	Name	Rationale
1915	Ernest Everett Just	Ernest E. Just	"Head of Physiology, Howard University Medical School for research in biology."
1916	Charles Young	Charles Young	"Services in organizing the Liberian Constabulary and roads in the Republic of Liberia."
1917	Harry Burleigh	Harry T. Burleigh	"Excellence in the field of creative music."
1918	William Braithwaite	William Stanley Braithwaite	"Distinguished achievements in literature."
1919	Archibald Grimké	Archibald H. Grimké	"U.S. Consul in Santo Domingo; President of American Negro Academy; for seventy years of distinguished service to his race and country."
1920	W. E. B. Du Bois	William Edward Burghardt (W. E. B.) Du Bois	"Author, Editor Crisis Magazine; founding and calling of Pan-African Congress."
1921	Charles Sidney Gilpin as Brutus Jones	Charles S. Gilpin	"Notable performance in the title role of The Emperor Jones and for excellence as an actor."
1922	Mary Burnett Talbert	Mary B. Talbert	"Former President of the National Association of Colored Women and for continued service to women of color."
1923	George Washington Carver	George Washington Carver	"Head of Department of Research and Director of the Experiment Station of Tuskegee Inst. For researching Agricultural Chemistry."
1924	Roland Hayes	Roland Hayes	"Singer; for artistry through interpreting Negro folk song; soloist with the Boston Symphony Orchestra."
1925	James Weldon Johnson	James Weldon Johnson	"Former U.S. Consul in Venezuela and Nicaragua; former editor and secretary of NAACP."
1926	Carter G. Woodson	Carter G. Woodson	"Historian and Founder of the Association for the Study of Negro Life and History; editor, Negro Orators and Their Orations for his outstanding work as an historian."
1927		Anthony Overton	"President of Victory Life Insurance Company, the first black company certified by the state of New York."
1928	Charles W. Chesnutt	Charles W. Chesnutt	"Author; for his pioneer work as a literary artist, depicting the life and struggle of Americans of Negro descent."
1929	Mordecai Wyatt Johnson	Mordecai Wyatt Johnson	"President of Howard University. For distinguished leadership as first black president."
1930	Henry A. Hunt	Henry Hunt	"Principal of the Fort Valley High and Industrial School, Fort Valley, GA. For twenty-five years of service in the education of black students."
1931		Richard Berry Harrison	"For his fine and reverent characterization of the Lord in Marc Connelly's Play – The Green Pastures."
1932	Robert Russa Moton	Robert Russa Moton	"Principal of the Tuskegee Institute. For excellent leadership and service in the field of education."
1933	Max Yergan	Max Yergan	"American Y.M.C.A. Secretary; missionary of intelligence, tact and self-sacrifice. For the excellence of his work in Africa."
1934		William Taylor Burwell Williams	"Dean of Tuskegee Institute, long service as field agent of the Slater and Jeanes Funds and the General Education Board."
1935	Mary McLeod Bethune	Mary McLeod Bethune	"Founder and President of Bethune Cookman College. For outstanding leadership and service to education."
1936	John Hope	John Hope (awarded posthumously)	"President of Atlanta University; distinguished leader of his race."
1937	Walter Francis White	Walter White	"Executive Secretary of NAACP. For his personal investigation of more than forty-one lynchings."
1938	No award given		
1939	Marian Anderson	Marian Anderson	"Chosen for her special achievement in music."
1940		Louis T. Wright	"Surgeon; chosen for his contribution to the healing of mankind and for his courageous position in the face of bitter attack."
1941	Richard Wright	Richard Wright	"Author; Uncle Tom's Children and Native Son. For his outstanding contributions to literature."
1942	A. Philip Randolph	A. Philip Randolph	"International President of the Brotherhood of Sleeping Car Porters. For his role in securing the presidential order to establish the FEPC in 1941."
1943	William H. Hastie	William H. Hastie	"Jurist and Educator; chosen for his distinguished career as a jurist and uncompromising champion of equal justice."
1944	Charles R. Drew	Charles Drew	"Scientist; chosen for his outstanding work in blood plasma; research led to establishment of blood plasma bank."
1945	Paul Robeson	Paul Robeson	"Singer and Actor chosen for distinguished achievement in the theatre and concert stage."
1946	Thurgood Marshall	Thurgood Marshall	"Special Counsel for NAACP. For distinguished service as a lawyer before the U.S. Supreme Court."
1947	Percy Julian	Dr. Percy Julian	"Research Chemist chosen for many important discoveries that have saved many lives."
1948	Channing Heggie Tobias	Channing H. Tobias	"In recognition of his consistent role as a defender of fundamental American liberties."
1949	Ralph Bunche	Ralph J. Bunche	"International civil servant; acting UN mediator in Palestine. For singular service to the United Nations."
1950		Charles Hamilton Houston	"Chairman, NAACP Legal Committee and stalwart defender of democracy."
1951		Mabel Keaton Staupers	"Leader of the National Association of Colored Graduate Nurses."
1952		Harry T. Moore	"NAACP leader in the state of Florida and a martyr in the crusade for freedom."
1953	Paul Williams	Paul R. Williams	"Distinguished architect, for his pioneer contributions as a creative designer of livable, attractive modern dwellings."
1954		Theodore K. Lawless	"Physician, educator and philanthropist. For pioneering achievements in dermatology."
1955		Carl J. Murphy	"Dedicated editor, publisher and farsighted civic leader."
1956	Jackie Robinson	Jack Roosevelt Robinson	"Brilliant and versatile athlete; for superb sportsmanship and for his singular role in athletics."
1957		Martin Luther King, Jr.	"Dedicated and selfless clergyman; for leadership role in the Montgomery bus protest movement."
1958		Daisy Bates and the Little Rock Nine	"For their pioneer role in upholding the basic ideals of American democracy in the face of continuing harassment and constant threats of bodily injury."
1959	Duke Ellington	Edward Kennedy (Duke) Ellington	"Composer and orchestra leader. For outstanding and unique musical achievements."
1960	Langston Hughes	Langston Hughes	"Poet, author and playwright."
1961		Kenneth B. Clark	"Professor of Psychology at the College of the City of New York; founder/director of the Northside Center for Child Development. For his dedicated service and inspired research in the field of psychology."
1962	Robert C. Weaver	Robert C. Weaver	"Administrator, Housing and Home Finance Agency; for his long years of dedicated public service at municipal, state and federal levels."
1963	Medgar Evers	Medgar Wiley Evers	"NAACP field secretary for the state of Mississippi. For his dedication and steadfast courage in the face of continued death threats."
1964	Roy Wilkins	Roy Wilkins	"Executive Director, NAACP. For his leadership, integrity and his dedicated service."
1965	Leontyne Price	Leontyne Price	"Metropolitan Opera star, in recognition of her divinely inspired talent."
1966		John H. Johnson	"Founder/President of the Johnson Publishing Company of Chicago."
1967	Edward Brooke	Edward W. Brooke, III	"First African American to win popular election to the United States Senate since Reconstruction."
1968	Sammy Davis Jr.	Sammy Davis, Jr.	"Broadway/Hollywood star and civil rights activist."
1969	Clarence Mitchell Jr.	Clarence M. Mitchell, Jr.	"Director, Washington Bureau, NAACP and civil rights lobbyist. For his pivotal role in the enactment of civil rights legislation."
1970		Jacob Lawrence	"Artist, teacher and humanitarian."
1971		Leon Howard Sullivan	"Clergyman, activist and prophet."
1972	Jacob Lawrence	Gordon Parks	"In recognition of his unique creativity, as exemplified by his outstanding achievements as photographer, writer, film maker and composer."
1973		Wilson C. Riles	"Educator, in recognition of the stature he has attained as a national leader in the field of education."
1974	Damon Keith	Damon J. Keith	"Jurist; in tribute to his steadfast defense of constitutional principles."
1975	No award given		
1976	Hank Aaron	Hank Aaron	"Athlete, in recognition of his singular achievement in the sport which symbolizes America – baseball; his impressive home run record."
1977 (Note: Two separate medals were awarded this year.)	Alvin Ailey	Alvin Ailey	"Innovative dancer, choreographer and artistic director."
1977	Alex Haley	Alex Haley	"Author, biographer and lecturer; exhaustive research and literary skill combined in Roots."
1978	No award given		
1979	Andrew Young	Andrew Young	"Minister plenipotentiary and extraordinary United States Ambassador to the United Nations."
1979		Rosa L. Parks	"In recognition to the quiet courage and determination exemplified when she refused to surrender her seat on a Montgomery, Alabama bus."
1980		Rayford W. Logan	"Educator, historian, author for his prodigious efforts to set before the world the black American's continuing struggle against oppression."
1981	Coleman Young	Coleman Alexander Young	"Mayor, City of Detroit; public servant, labor leader."
1982	Benjamin Mays	Benjamin Elijah Mays	"Educator, theologian and humanitarian."
1983	Lena Horne	Lena Horne	"Artist humanitarian and living symbol of excellence."
1984	No award given		
1985	Tom Bradley	Tom Bradley	"Government executive, public servant, humanist; Mayor of Los Angeles for 20 years."
1985	Bill Cosby	Bill Cosby	"Humorist, artist, educator, family man and humanitarian."
1986		Benjamin Lawson Hooks	"Executive Director, NAACP. In tribute to his precedent-setting accomplishments."
1987		Percy Ellis Sutton	"Public servant, businessman, community leader."
1988		Frederick Douglass Patterson	"Educator, doctor of veterinary medicine, visionary and humanitarian."
1989	Jesse Jackson	Jesse Louis Jackson	"Clergyman, political leader, civil rights activist; first American of African descent to become a major presidential candidate."
1990	Douglas Wilder	Lawrence Douglas Wilder	"Governor, public servant, attorney and visionary in tribute to an extraordinary life of accomplishment."
1991	Colin Powell	Colin L. Powell	"General of the U.S. Army, 12th Chairman, Joint Chiefs of Staff, U.S. Department of Defense."
1992	Barbara Jordan	Barbara Jordan	"Lawyer, educator, political leader and stateswoman."
1993	Dorothy Height	Dorothy Irene Height	"National Council of Negro Women; National YWCA; The Center for Radical Justice; President, Delta Sigma Theta sorority. For extraordinary leadership in advancing women’s rights."
1994	Maya Angelou speaking at the first inauguration of President Bill Clinton	Maya Angelou	"Poet, author, actress, playwright, producer, educator and historian."
1995	John Hope Franklin	John Hope Franklin	"Historian, scholar and educator; in recognition of an unrelenting quest for truth and the enlightenment of Western Civilization."
1996	A. Leon Higginbotham Jr.	A. Leon Higginbotham, Jr.	"Jurist, Scholar, teacher and humanitarian; in honor of a distinguished jurist who emerged a giant of jurisprudence during a three-decade tenure as the nation’s longest serving active Federal Judge."
1997		Carl T. Rowan	"Journalist, publicist, civic leader and public servant."
1998	Myrlie Evers-Williams	Myrlie Evers-Williams	"Civil rights activist, risk-taker, mother, true believer."
1999	Earl G. Graves Sr.	Earl G. Graves, Sr.	"Founder, Black Enterprise Magazine; Businessman, publisher, educator, advocate, entrepreneur, family man."
2000	Oprah Winfrey	Oprah Winfrey	"Actress, producer, educator, publisher and humanitarian."
2001	Vernon Jordan	Vernon E. Jordan	"Lawyer, Advisor to Presidents, Champion of Civil Rights and Human Rights, Exemplar and True Believer."
2002	John Lewis	John Lewis	"Public servant, protector of civil and human rights, community leader and inspirer of youth."
2003	Constance Baker Motley	Constance Baker Motley	"Civil rights pioneer, jurist, public official, for her commitment and pursuit of the goal of equal opportunity and justice for all Americans."
2004	Robert L. Carter	Robert L. Carter	"Attorney, educator, federal judge and guardian of civil rights; for his extraordinary achievement of winning twenty-one cases argued before the Supreme Court."
2005	Oliver Hill (attorney)	Oliver W. Hill	"For his key role in the United States Supreme Court Case, Brown v. Board; for his determined, quiet and persistent pursuit of justice."
2006	Ben Carson	Benjamin S. Carson, Sr.	"In tribute to a lifetime of growth and singular achievement, from the bottom of his fifth grade class, to become the youngest ever Chief of Pediatric Neurosurgery in the United States."
2007	John Conyers	John Conyers, Jr.	"Guardian of Civil Rights and Civil Liberties, consummate legislator and public servant."
2008	Ruby Dee	Ruby Dee	"Actress, poet, playwright and civil rights activist"
2009	Julian Bond	Julian Bond	"Former Chairman of the NAACP Board of Directors and legendary civil rights activist"
2010	Cicely Tyson	Cicely Tyson	"Actress and civil rights activist"
2011	Frankie Muse Freeman	Frankie Muse Freeman	"Attorney and civil rights activist."
2012	Harry Belafonte	Harry Belafonte	"Singer, song writer, actor and social activist."
2013	Jessye Norman	Jessye Norman	"Opera singer, Grammy Award winner."
2014	Quincy Jones	Quincy Jones	"Composer, Producer, Grammy Award winner."
2015	Sidney Poitier	Sidney Poitier	"Actor and Social activist, Oscar Winner."
2016	Nathaniel R. Jones	Nathaniel R. Jones	"Lawyer, Jurist, Academic and Public Servant"
2018	Willie L. Brown	Willie L. Brown	Former mayor of San Francisco and former speaker of the California Assembly
2019	Patrick Gaspard	Patrick Gaspard	a lifelong community activist, a former American diplomat, and the current president of the Center for American Progress
2021		Cato T. Laurencin	Van Dusen Distinguished Endowed Professor at the University of Connecticut
2022	Jim Clyburn	Jim Clyburn	House Majority Whip
2023	Hazel Dukes	Hazel Dukes	8th National President of the NAACP
2024	Henry Louis Gates	Henry Louis Gates Jr.	"Esteemed historian and literary scholar."
2025	Kamala Harris	Kamala Harris	Vice President of the United States
2026	Amos Brown	Amos Brown	Pastor and civil rights activist

== Notes ==
Footnotes

Specific references

General references

- "The Spingarn Medal". NAACP. Archived from the original on July 6, 2017.
- "Spingarn Medal Winners: 1915 to Today". NAACP. Archived from the original on November 1, 2017.
