= Valerie Kinloch =

American writer and academic administrator

15th President of Johnson C. Smith University
- Incumbent
- Assumed office August 1, 2023
- Preceded by: Clarence D. Armbrister

Personal details
- Born: January 30, 1974 (age 52)
- Education: Johnson C. Smith University; Wayne State University (PhD)
- Occupation: Writer, educator, academic administrator

Valerie Kinloch (born 1974) is an American writer, educator, and academic administrator. She is the president of the Johnson C. Smith University as of August 2023. She also served as the Renée and Richard Goldman Dean of the University of Pittsburgh School of Education.

== Life ==
Kinloch is from Charleston, South Carolina. She earned a bachelor's degree in English and literature from the Johnson C. Smith University (JCSU) in 1996. She earned a master's degree (December 1998) in English and African-American literature and a Ph.D. in English from Wayne State University.

For three and a half years, Klinoch was an assistant professor of English focusing on composition and rhetoric at the University of Houston–Downtown. She later worked as an associate professor of English education at the Teachers College, Columbia University. She was an associate dean and professor at the Ohio State University. In July 2017, Kinloch became the Renée and Richard Goldman Dean of the University of Pittsburgh School of Education.

In June 2023, she was named the 15th president of JCSU, effective August 1. She succeeds Clarence D. Armbrister.

== Selected works ==
- Kinloch, Valerie (2006). June Jordan: Her Life and Letters. Bloomsbury Academic. ISBN 978-0-275-98241-6.
- Kinloch, Valerie (2010). Harlem on Our Minds: Place, Race, and the Literacies of Urban Youth. Teachers College Press. ISBN 978-0-8077-5023-0.
- Kinloch, Valerie (2012). Crossing Boundaries-teaching and Learning with Urban Youth. Teachers College Press. ISBN 978-0-8077-5294-4.
