= Johnson C. Smith University =

Historically black university in Charlotte, North Carolina, US

- Former names: Biddle Memorial Institute (1867–1876); Biddle University (1876–1923)
- Motto: Sit Lux
- Motto in English: Let There Be Light
- Type: Private historically black university
- Established: 1867; 159 years ago
- Affiliations: UNCF
- Religious affiliation: Presbyterian Church (USA)
- Endowment: $51.1 million (beneficiary of the Duke Endowment, 1924)
- President: Valerie Kinloch
- Faculty: 159
- Students: 1,102
- Location: Charlotte, North Carolina, U.S. 35.243°N 80.856°W
- Campus: Urban, 105 acres (42 ha)
- Colors: Gold and navy blue
- Nickname: Golden Bulls
- Sporting affiliations: NCAA Division II – Central Intercollegiate Athletic Association
- Mascot: The Golden Bull
- Website: jcsu.edu

Johnson C. Smith University (JCSU) is a private historically black university in Charlotte, North Carolina, United States. It is affiliated with the Presbyterian Church (USA) and accredited by the Southern Association of Colleges and Schools (SACS).

== History ==
Johnson C. Smith University was established on April 7, 1867, as the Biddle Memorial Institute at a meeting of the Catawba Presbytery in the old Charlotte Presbyterian Church. Mary D. Biddle donated $1,400 to the school. The school was then named after her late husband, Henry Jonathan Biddle, who had died after the Battle of Glendale in 1862. The corresponding women's school was Scotia Seminary (now Barber-Scotia College).

In 1876, the charter was changed by the legislature of the State of North Carolina and the name became Biddle University, under which name the institution operated until 1923.

In 1891, Biddle University elected Daniel J. Sanders as the first African-American as president of a four-year institution in the South.

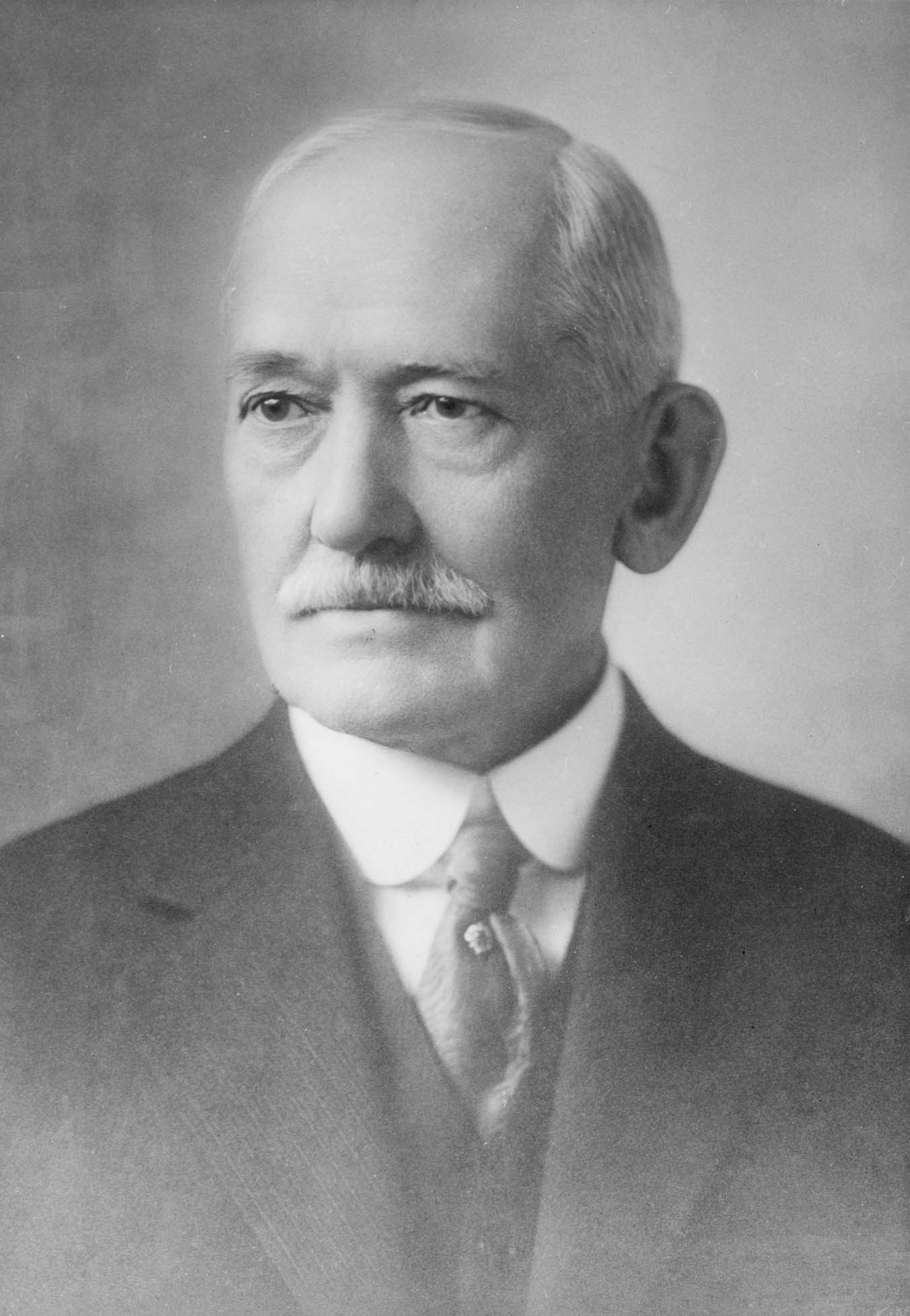
Johnson Crayne Smith

From 1921 to 1922, Jane Berry Smith donated funds to build a theological dormitory, a science hall, a teachers' cottage, a memorial gate, and an endowment in memory of her late husband, Johnson C. Smith. She later donated funds for five more buildings and a campus church. In recognition, Biddle University's president Dr. H. L. McCrorey announced on February 3, 1922, that the institution would refer to itself as The Johnson C. Smith University. A newspaper at the time noted that "While the name will be used at once, unofficially, an application for the charter changes necessary cannot be accomplished until the meeting of the next general assembly," and the charter was amended to make the name change official on March 1, 1923.

In 1924, James B. Duke established the Duke Endowment. While the largest share of that the endowment's earnings are allocated to support Duke University, Duke's donation required that 4% of its earnings be given to Johnson C. Smith University.

In 1932, the university's charter was amended, providing for the admission of women. The 65-year-old institution for men then became partially coeducational. The first residence hall for women, named in memory of James B. Duke, was dedicated in 1940. In 1941, women were admitted to the freshman class. In 1942, the university was a fully coeducational institution.

JCSU joined the United Negro College Fund in 1944 as a founding member. This fund was organized primarily to help church-related schools of higher learning to revamp their training programs, to expand their physical plants, to promote faculty growth and to create new areas of service.

In 1994, Dorothy Cowser Yancy became the first woman president of the university.

In June 2025 the university was placed on Probation for Good Cause status by its educational accreditor, the Southern Association of Colleges and Schools, after the accreditor's board found significant non-compliance with its standards for financial controls. Probation for Good Cause is the most serious sanction the accreditor can apply to a university short of revoking its accreditation.

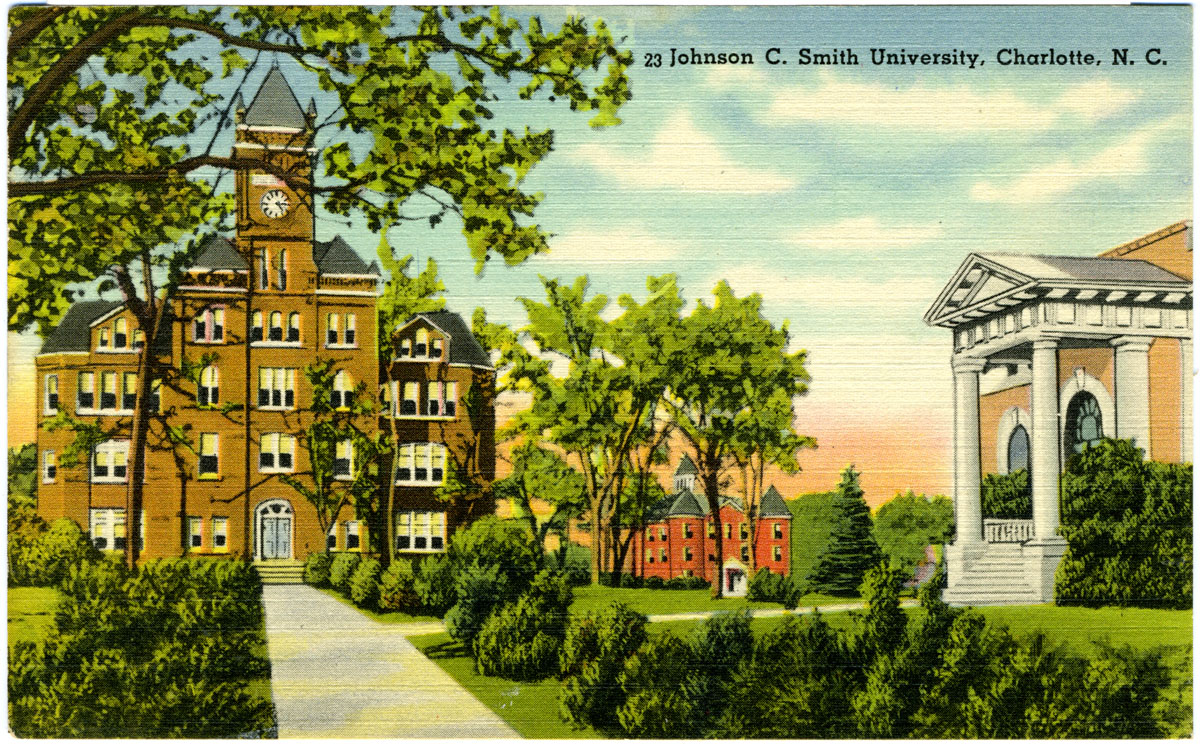
Biddle Hall (left) and Carnegie Library (right), c. 1930s–1940s

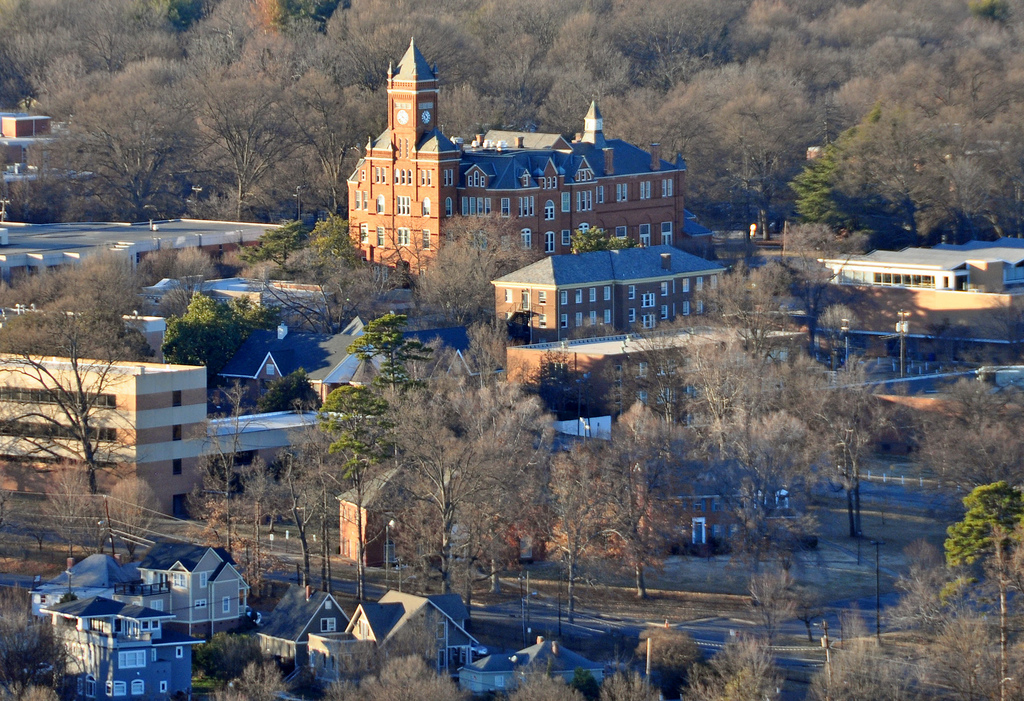
Biddle Memorial Hall

== Campus ==
The university is located on Beatties Ford Road and West Trade Street in Charlotte, North Carolina. It consists of 105 acres in an urban setting. Its Biddle Memorial Hall dates to 1883 and was added to the National Register of Historic Places on October 14, 1975.

== Academics ==
The university awards Bachelor of Science, Bachelor of Arts, Bachelor of Social Work, and Master of Social Work degrees. Johnson C. Smith University has 25 degree programs for undergraduate students and one for graduate students. These are typically organized into three colleges: the College of Business and Professional Studies; the College of Liberal Arts; and the College of Science, Technology, Engineering, and Mathematics (STEM).

The Robert L. Albright Honors College is also available to qualified high-achieving undergraduate students at JCSU. The college is named after the 11th president of the university.

Metropolitan College offers accelerated undergraduate degree programs to adults with courses available on-campus and online.

=== James B. Duke Memorial Library ===
The James B. Duke Memorial Library was built in 1967 in memory of Duke, a major benefactor to the university. Carnegie Library, the existing library at that time, was not large enough to meet the expanding academic programming and increasing enrollment. In 1998, the library completed a $7 million yearlong modernization and reconstruction to allow the building to serve as an information hub in a digital age.

The James B. Duke Memorial Library is also the home of a 8.5 by 20 feet (2.6 by 6.1 m). mural created by Philadelphia artist Paul F. Keene Jr. The mural illustrates the university's founding and development.

== Student life ==
The Office of Student Leadership and Engagement (SLE) oversees the Student Government Association (SGA), Royal Court, Greek Life Organizations (National Pan-Hellenic Council and United Greek Council), Golden Bulls Activities Committee (GBAC), and over 30 Student Clubs and Organizations. The JCSU Intramural and Recreation Program offers opportunities for students to participate in intramural sports, club sports, fitness programs, and informal recreational activities.

=== Fraternities and sororities ===
All nine of the National Pan-Hellenic Council organizations currently have chapters at Johnson C. Smith University.

== Athletics ==
Student-athletes currently compete in 13 NCAA sports. JCSU is a member of Division II, Central Intercollegiate Athletic Association (CIAA). Its intercollegiate sports programs include basketball, bowling, cross-country, football, golf, softball, volleyball, tennis, and track and field. Its teams are nicknamed the Golden Bulls.

== Notable people ==
=== Presidents ===
Name	Term	References
Stephen Mattoon	1870–1884	
William Alexander Holliday	1884–1885	
William F. Johnson	1886–1891	
Daniel J. Sanders	1891–1907	
Henry Lawrence McCrorey	1907–1947	
Hardy Liston	1947–1956	
James W. Seabrook	1956–1957	
Rufus P. Perry	1957–1968	
Lionel Newsom	1968–1972	
Wilbert Greenfield	1973–1982	
Robert Albright	1983–1994	
Dorothy Cowser Yancy	1994–2008	
Ronald L. Carter	2008–2018	
Clarence D. Armbrister	2018–2023	
Valerie Kinloch	2023–present	

=== Faculty ===
Name	Department	Notability	Reference
Kelly Alexander	professor	Democratic member of the North Carolina General Assembly	
George Edward Davis	professor of natural science	Davis taught at Biddle University (now Johnson C. Smith University) for 35 years, and later organized and fundraised for Rosenwald schools in North Carolina	
Henry A. Hunt	professor	Winner of the Spingarn Medal award. In the 1930s Hunt was invited to participate in President Franklin D. Roosevelt's Black Cabinet	
Edward Jackson	football coach	One of the greatest HBCU football coaches of all-time. His all-time coaching record is 141–62–12. His record at JCSU is 30–14–4.	
Mary Jackson McCrorey		Counselor of women, wife of president H. L. McCrorey.	
Jimmie McKee	contributor	Founder of Johnson C. Smith University athletic booster program the 100 Club. He became a successful Charlotte businessman, contributing to Johnson C Smith University, NAACP, Colored NC Police Association, Democratic Party and YMCA.	
Mike Minter	football assistant coach	Professional football player.	
Pinckney Warren Russell	professor	was an American classics scholar, Presbyterian pastor, and educator.	
Steve Wilks	football assistant coach	Professional football coach.	
