= William T. B. Williams =

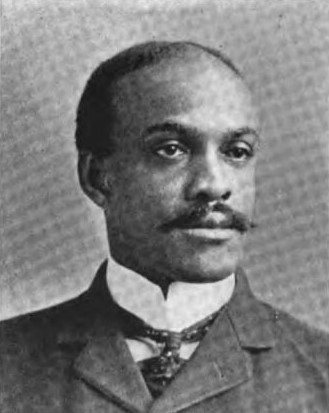
- Born: William Taylor Burwell Williams; July 3, 1869 near Stone Bridge, Virginia, U.S.
- Died: March 26, 1941 (aged 71)
- Education: Harvard University; Phillips Academy; Hampton Institute

William Taylor Burwell Williams (July 3, 1869 – March 26, 1941) was an American educator. He was Dean of the College Department at Tuskegee Institute and two-time president of the National Association of Teachers in Colored Schools (later renamed the American Teachers Association, it merged with the NEA in 1966). He was a member of U.S. Commissions on Education in Haiti and the Virgin Islands, and a member of the U.S. War Department Committee on Education and Special Training. Williams worked as a field agent of the Slater and Jeanes Funds and the General Education Board. He taught at Hampton Institute and was a member of the editorial staff of its journal Southern Workman. In 1934, he was the recipient of the NAACP's Spingarn Medal.

Williams was born on a farm near Stone Bridge, Virginia. He graduated from Hampton Institute in 1888, Phillips Academy in 1893 and Harvard University in 1897. He received an LL. D. from Morehouse College in 1923.
