= James J. H. Gregory =

American educator and businessman (1827–1910)

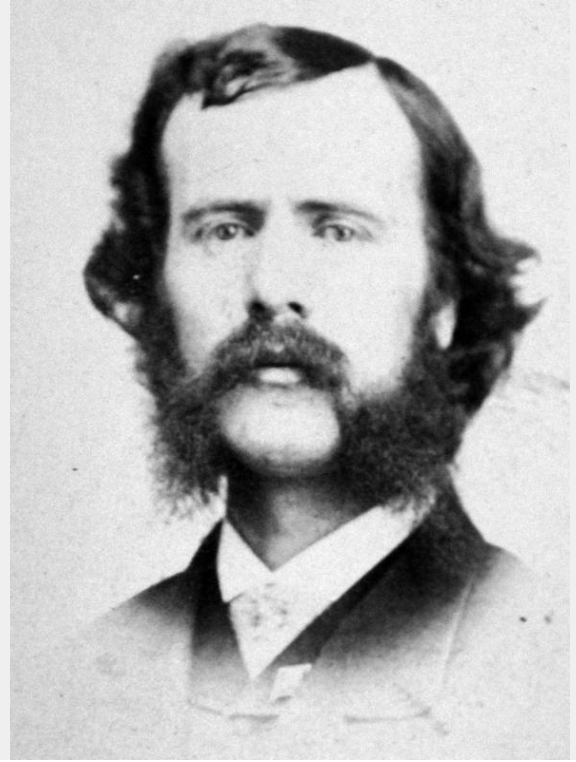
- Gregory at Amherst College, class of 1849
- Born: James John Howard Gregory; November 7, 1827; Marblehead, Massachusetts, U.S.
- Died: February 20, 1910 (aged 82); Marblehead, Massachusetts, U.S.
- Burial place: Waterside Cemetery, Marblehead, Massachusetts
- Other name: "Seed King of Marblehead"
- Education: Middlebury College; Amherst College
- Occupations: Educator; businessman; writer; politician; philanthropist
- Known for: Seed company; Philanthropy
- Title: Massachusetts State Senator
- Term: 1876–1877
- Spouses: Eliza Candler Bubier (m. 1863; died 1876) Harriet Roundey (m. 1878; died 1894) Sarah Lydia Caswell (m. 1895)
- Children: 4, adopted

James John Howard Gregory (November 7, 1827 – February 20, 1910) was an American educator, horticultural businessman, writer, politician and philanthropist from Marblehead, Massachusetts. After working as a teacher and school principal, he founded the seed company James J. H. Gregory & Son in 1854. The business sold vegetable and flower seeds and was associated with the Hubbard squash, the cherry tomato and the Danvers onion. Gregory was known as the "Seed King of Marblehead".

Gregory served as a Marblehead selectman and as a Massachusetts State Senator from 1876 to 1877. He wrote practical works on vegetable gardening and soil fertility. Through his philanthropy he supported local projects in Marblehead and education for African Americans, including the Gregory Normal School in Wilmington, North Carolina, and the Marblehead Libraries, a travelling library service for African-American schools and colleges in the southern United States.

== Biography ==
=== Early life ===
James John Howard Gregory was born in Marblehead, Massachusetts, on November 7, 1827, to James Adams Gregory and Ruth Gregory (née Roundey). His father worked as a justice of the peace and customs officer in Marblehead.

=== Education and teaching ===
Gregory attended public schools in Marblehead and studied for two years at Middlebury College. He taught at Marblehead Academy and the Farm School before graduating from Amherst College in 1850. After graduating, he taught in Marblehead and Lunenburg. From 1851 to 1854, he was principal of Derby Academy in Hingham, Massachusetts.

=== Seed business ===
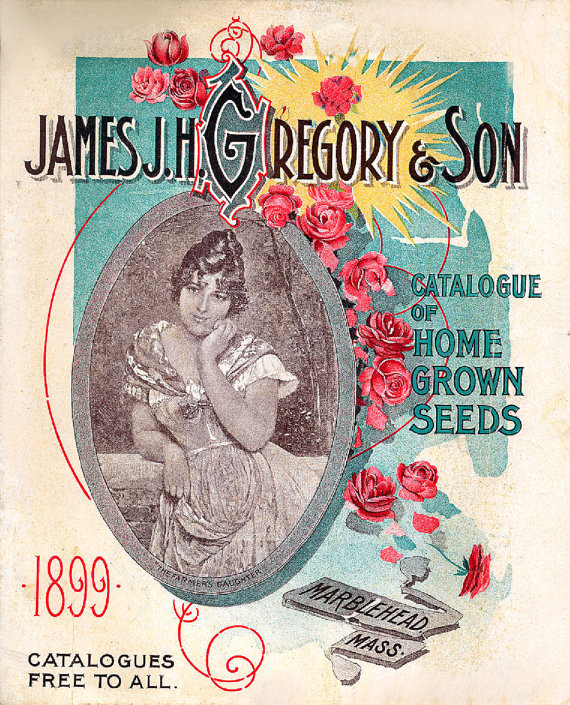
1899 seed catalogue

In 1854, Gregory began operating James J. H. Gregory & Son from his home. According to a local account, he responded to an advertisement in New England Farmer seeking squash seed. He sent seed that his father had received from their neighbour Elizabeth "Marm" Hubbard. The variety was named the Hubbard squash and became popular.

Gregory was an early user of seed catalogues in his business. He packaged seeds in paper envelopes, with illustrations used to identify the contents. According to the Victory Horticultural Library, he developed the first cherry tomato and was a distributor of the Danvers onion. He also developed other vegetable and plant varieties. He was among the leading seed sellers in the United States and was known as the "Seed King of Marblehead".

As the business grew, Gregory moved a fish-drying house from Gerry Island to 59 Elm Street in Marblehead for use as a seed-drying warehouse. Known as the "Squash House", the building survived into the 21st century.

=== Writing ===
Gregory wrote practical guides on vegetable gardening. His books included Squashes: How to Grow Them (1867), Fertilizers: Where the Materials Come From (1886), and Cabbages and Cauliflowers: How to Grow Them (1908). He also wrote for horticultural magazines.

=== Politics ===
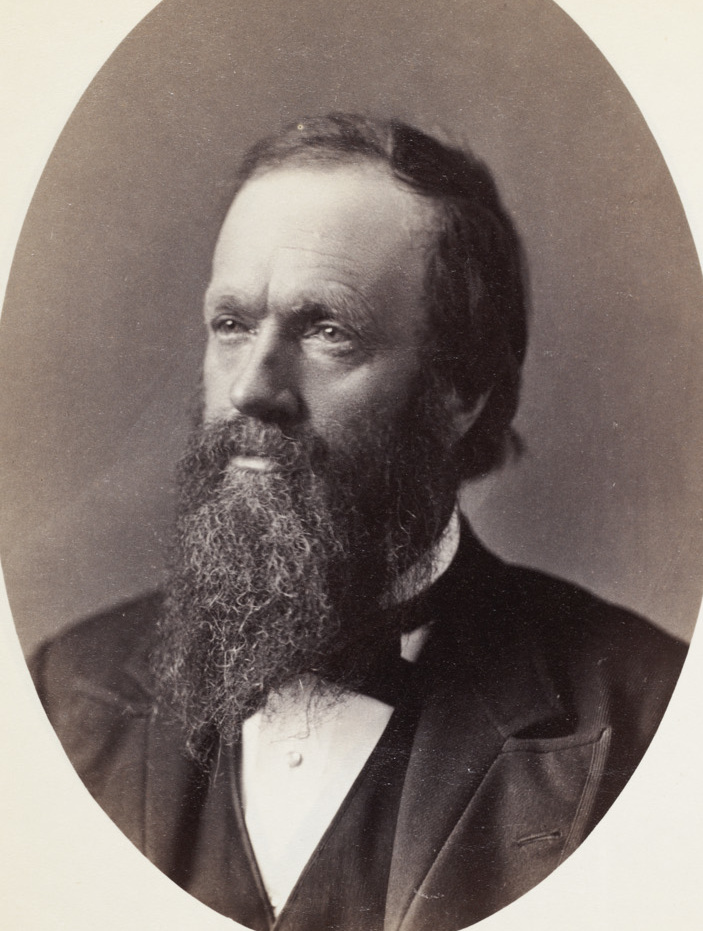
Gregory, c. 1878

Gregory was elected to the Board of Selectmen in Marblehead in 1861 and 1868. He was a Republican and served as a Massachusetts State Senator from 1876 to 1877, representing the 2nd Essex district. He was elected by the joint vote of the Republican and Prohibition parties.

=== Philanthropy ===
Gregory limited his annual personal expenses to $300 and donated the rest of his income. In 1907, he retired and devoted his time to philanthropy.

Gregory gave art to local schools and churches, provided the land that became Fountain Park, and donated the bell and clock for Abbot Hall when it became Marblehead's town hall.

In 1880, Gregory anonymously gave funds under the name "Howard" for a predominantly Black Congregational church in Wilmington, North Carolina. His support followed his involvement with the American Missionary Association and his interest in the needs of freedpeople after the American Civil War. His identity was disclosed during the church's 1881 dedication. The church, originally named Christ's Congregational Church, later became known as Gregory Congregational Church.

Gregory also supported African-American education. In 1883, he made a donation to the Wilmington Normal School, a high school for African Americans in Wilmington. The school was renamed the Gregory Normal School after his contribution.

==== Marblehead Libraries ====
In 1910, Gregory founded the Marblehead Libraries, a travelling library service for more than 50 African-American schools and colleges in the southern United States. The service continued for 20 years with funds donated by Gregory. In the same year, Gregory funded a librarian apprentice program at the Louisville Free Public Library in Louisville, Kentucky, which operated until 1929.

=== Personal life and death ===
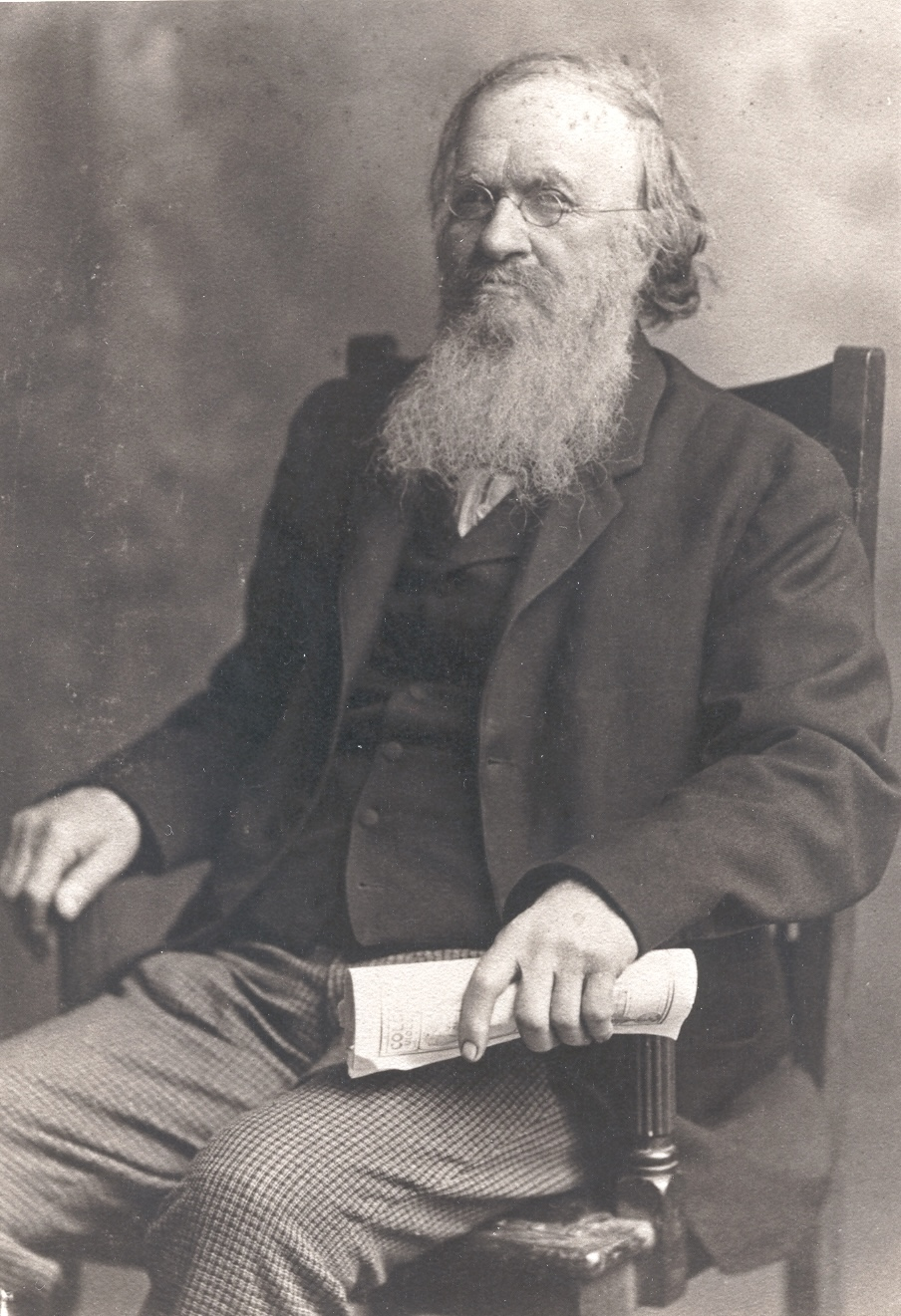
Gregory in later life

Gregory married three times and had four adopted children. He married Eliza Candler Bubier on December 30, 1863. They adopted three children, James, Edgar and Annie, from a South Boston orphanage. After Eliza's death, he adopted a second daughter, Laura. In 1878, Gregory married Harriet Roundey, who died in 1894. In 1895, he married Sarah Lydia Caswell, who died in 1922.

Gregory wrote poetry, some of which was published in Essex Antiquarian. His poem "Ode to Evelyn" was written in memory of his granddaughter, Evelyn Burroughs. Gregory also collected Native American artefacts and wrote an article about the collection for Essex Antiquarian.

Gregory built a coastal house on Peach's Point in Marblehead. He invited President James A. Garfield to use the house during the summer of 1881, but Garfield declined.

Gregory died on February 20, 1910. He was buried in Waterside Cemetery in Marblehead. His will established a fund in Marblehead to provide payments to new mothers of twins born during the year. Gregory Street, on the Townside Harbor Front in Marblehead, was named for him.

== Publications ==
- Onion Raising: What Kinds to Raise, and the Way to Raise Them (Boston: A. Williams & Company, 1865)
- Squashes: How to Grow Them (New York: Orange Judd Company, c. 1867)
- Pamphlets on Vegetable Gardening (Marblehead, Mass: Messenger Steam Printing House, 1867–1883)
- Cabbages: How to Grow Them (New York: Orange Judd Company, c. 1870)
- Carrots, Mangold Wurtzels and Sugar Beets (Marblehead, Mass: N.A. Lindsey & Co., c. 1877)
- Fertilizers (Boston: Rand, Avery & Company, 1885)
- Cabbages and Cauliflowers: How to Grow Them (Boston: S. J. Parkhill & Co., 1908)
