= Johnson C. Smith =

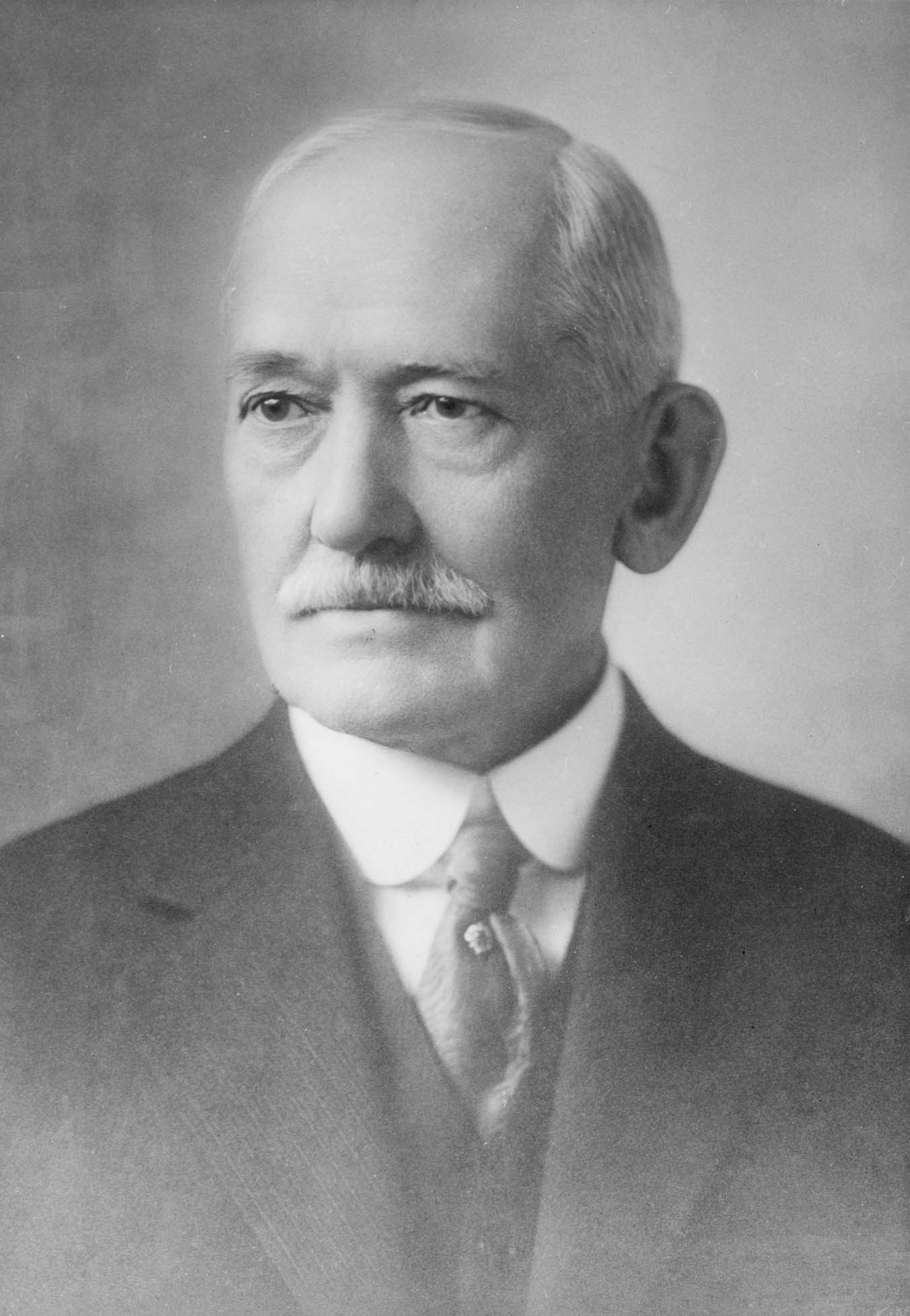
- Born: October 27, 1844; Amwell, Pennsylvania
- Died: August 20, 1919 (aged 74); Pittsburgh, Pennsylvania
- Occupation: Businessman
- Known for: Street railway construction, namesake of Johnson C. Smith University

Johnson Crayne Smith (October 27, 1844 – August 20, 1919) was an early 20th-century businessman from Pittsburgh and the namesake of Johnson C. Smith University.

== Early life and education ==
Smith was a son of James and Margaret (Johnson) Smith, of one of Washington county's early families, the grandfather, Dennis Smith, a soldier of the Revolution, being one of the pioneer settlers. Johnson C. Smith, was born in Amwell township, Washington county, Pa., Oct. 27, 1844.

Smith attended Washington and Jefferson College in Washington, Pennsylvania. On Oct. 24, 1883, Smith married Jane Morrow Berry, daughter of James H. and Jane (Morrow) Berry.

== Career ==
Smith operated a drug store in McKeesport, Pennsylvania. His establishment was known as the Hiawatha Drug Store. He was chairman of the executive committee of the McKeesport Tin Plate Company, second vice-president of the People's Bank of McKeesport, an organizer and president of the McKeesport Street Railway Company, and an officer and director of the McKeesport Gas Company. He also owned a real estate and co-founded the McKeesport Tin Plate Company.

Mr. Smith moved to Pittsburgh in 1910, and joined the Third Presbyterian Church. He served on the board of the Association for the Improvement of the Poor.

== Death ==
Smith died in Pittsburgh in 1919. After his death, his wife, Jane Berry Smith of Pittsburgh, gave funds to build a theological dormitory, a science hall, a teachers' cottage, and a memorial gate at the Biddle University, an historically black university in Charlotte, North Carolina. She also donated significant sum to the endowment in memory of her late husband.

In appreciation, the Biddle University trustees changed the name of the university to Johnson C. Smith University. The change was made official on March 1, 1923. The university's seminary, the Biddle Memorial Institute, was also renamed the Johnson C. Smith Theological Seminary.
