= George E. Davis (educator) =

American educator (1862–1959)

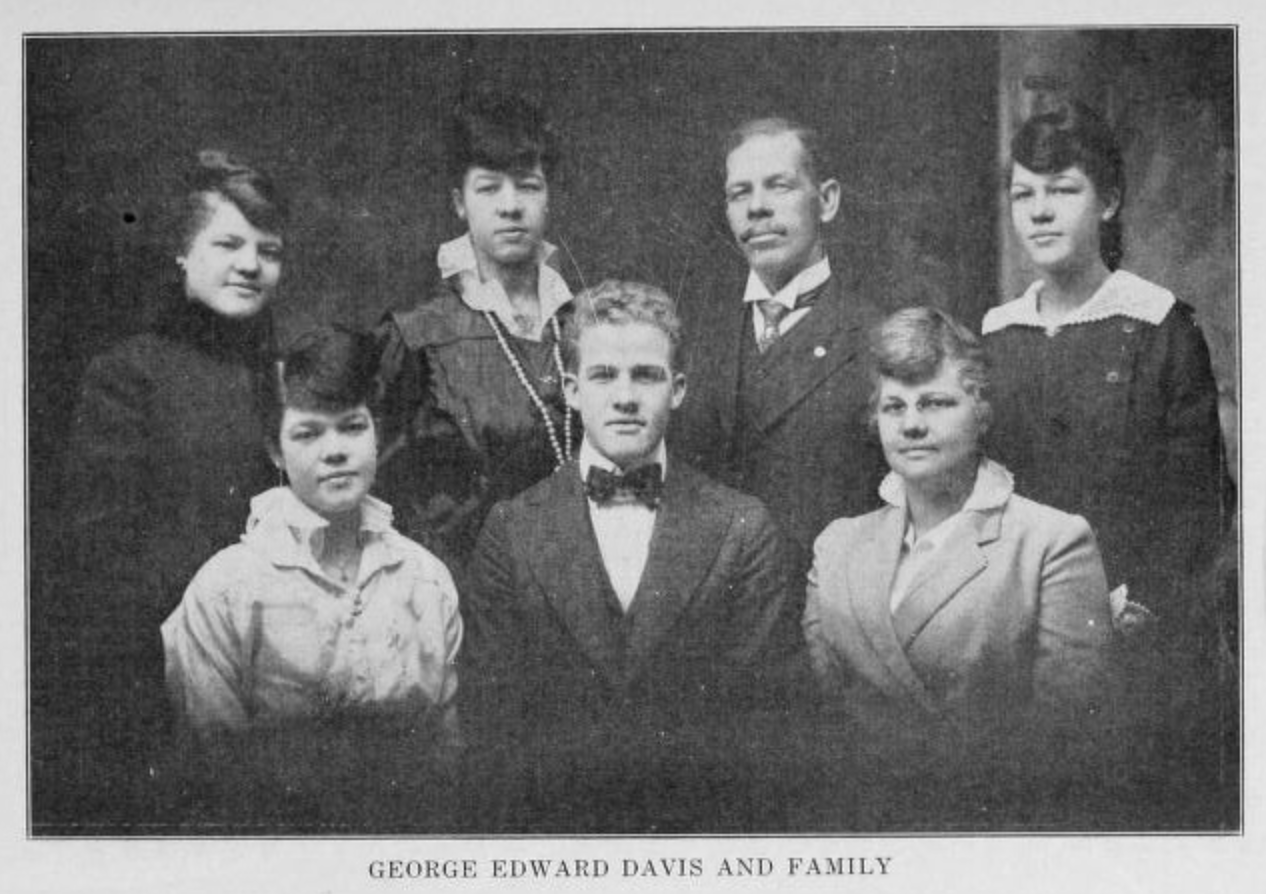
- George E. Davis and his family, c. 1917
- Born: George Edward Davis; March 24, 1862; Wilmington, North Carolina, U.S.
- Died: January 11, 1959 (aged 96); Greensboro, North Carolina, U.S.
- Burial place: West Pinewood Cemetery, Charlotte, North Carolina, U.S.
- Education: Biddle University, Howard University
- Occupations: Educator, Black community leader
- Spouse: Marie Elizabeth Gaston (m. 1891)
- Children: 7

George Edward Davis (1862–1959) was an American educator, and Black community leader in North Carolina. He served as a professor of natural science at Biddle University (now Johnson C. Smith University) a historically black university, and was involved in the building of Rosenwald schools. A historical marker near his home site commemorates his history.

== Early life and education ==
George Edward Davis was born in March 24, 1862, in Wilmington, North Carolina. His parents were Hester Ann (née Price) and Edward Alexander Davis. Davis attended school at Gregory Normal Institute in Wilmington, North Carolina.

Davis graduated in 1883 from Biddle University (now Johnson C. Smith University) in Charlotte, North Carolina. He received a doctorate from Howard University. Davis had honorary degrees from Biddle University (PhD), and Lincoln University (LLD) in Pennsylvania.

He was married to Marie Elizabeth "Mamie" Gaston in 1891, and they had 7 children.

== Career ==
In 1885 he became Biddle University's first Black professor, where he remained for the next 35 years as a teacher. In 1905 he became Dean of Faculty. He is listed in the school's 1914–1915 catalogue.

In 1921, he left Biddle to organize and fundraise for Rosenwald schools in North Carolina. His appointment as supervisor of Rosenwald buildings in 1921 was by Nathan Carter Newbold, the first director of the Division of Negro Education in North Carolina. He retired in 1935. The program built 795 schools for African Americans in North Carolina.

He served as the president (1930–1932) and executive secretary (1932–1943) of the North Carolina Teachers Association (NCTA).

== Death and legacy ==
Davis died on January 11, 1959, in Greensboro, North Carolina, and was buried at West Pinewood Cemetery.

Davis was profiled in the book, History of the American Negro and His Institutions, Vol. 4 North Carolina (1917), edited by Arthur Bunyan Caldwell.
