= Marblehead Libraries =

Former traveling library

- Location: Southern United States, United States
- Type: Mobile library
- Established: 1910
- Dissolved: c. 1930

Marblehead Libraries were collections of books that comprised a traveling library service for African-Americans and poor rural whites in the Southern United States beginning in 1910. The libraries, funded by James J. H. Gregory of Marblehead, Massachusetts, traveled primarily to schools; the service often provided the only access to library books for African Americans in the South.

== History ==
Because municipalities in the South provided little to no public library service to African Americans through the 1910s, philanthropic efforts often provided their only access to library books. James J. H. Gregory, a white seed salesman who had seen the plight of southern blacks during his time as a Union Civil War soldier, recognized the harm done when they were denied access to public libraries; Gregory believed everyone should have access to "character-forming books". In addition to his other philanthropy, Gregory sought to send books to "schools intended for the children of the poor, particularly the Negroes and the mountain white people".

In cooperation with George Sherwood Dickerman, Gregory solicited suggestions in 1908 for appropriate titles from black colleges and universities, as well as Southern public libraries that had collections for African Americans. Gregory selected and purchased each of the 2,000 titles in the collection and stamped the books "Marblehead Libraries"; the libraries began circulating in 1910.

The Marblehead Libraries consisted of 60 separate libraries with approximately 48 titles each; they were available to any institution or individual that would agree to be responsible for the collection. Each collection could be kept for up to one year and then exchanged for a different collection. The program was administered by Atlanta University, which encouraged circulation and kept track of the collections. The libraries visited black schools and organizations throughout the South.

Gregory died February 20, 1910, shortly after funding the Marblehead Libraries. The program continued for twenty years with the administrative funds provided by Gregory.
