= Mary Jackson McCrorey =

American educator and mission worker

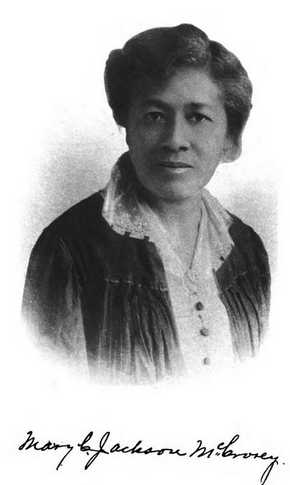
Mary Jackson McCrorey, from a 1921 publication.

Mary Jackson McCrorey (November 9, 1867 – January 13, 1944) was an American educator, mission worker, and leader in the Young Women's Christian Association (YWCA).

== Early life ==
Mary C. Jackson was born in Athens, Georgia, the daughter of Alfred Jackson and Louisa Terrell Jackson. She was the Jacksons' eighth child and their first free-born child, born after the end of the American Civil War and Emancipation. Mary C. Jackson attended Atlanta University.

== Career ==
Jackson taught school in Athens, after college. She was also a school principal in Orlando, Florida for four years. From 1896 to 1916, Mary Jackson was associate principal at Haines Normal and Industrial Institute in Augusta, Georgia, working closely with the school's founder Lucy Craft Laney. She wrote a profile of Lucy Craft Laney for The Crisis in 1934.

After her marriage, McCrorey was based in Charlotte, North Carolina, where she worked in various capacities at Johnson C. Smith University. She served as president of the Baptist Division of Missions for Colored People, and was active in bringing the first YWCAs for black women in the American South. She was an officer of the International Council of Women of the Darker Races. She was part of a network of Southern black women at universities who were also involved with the YWCA and the National Association of Colored Women's Clubs (NACW), including Juliette Derricotte, Jennie B. Moton, Margaret Murray Washington, and Nettie Langston Napier. From 1920 to 1944, Mary Jackson McCrorey served on the National Commission on Interracial Cooperation.

In 1941, McCrorey was awarded an honorary doctorate by Benedict College.

== Personal life ==
Mary C. Jackson married Henry Lawrence McCrorey, a widower and the president of Johnson C. Smith University, in 1916. She died in 1944, aged 76 years. After Henry's death in 1951, the black YMCA in Charlotte, North Carolina was renamed the McCrorey Family YMCA.
