= Biddle Memorial Hall =

Historic school building in North Carolina, US

- Biddle Memorial Hall, Johnson C. Smith University
- U.S. National Register of Historic Places
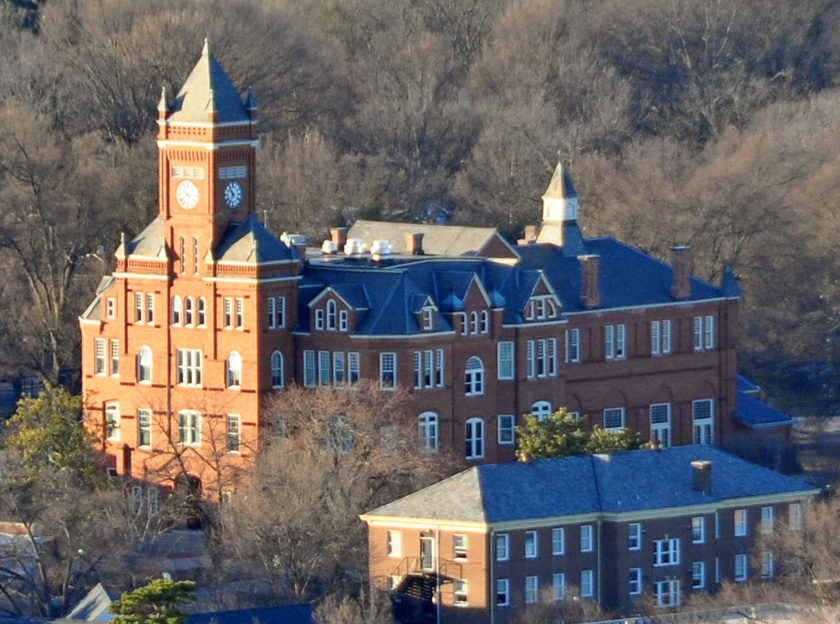

- Location within North Carolina Location within the United States
- Location: Beatties Ford Rd. and W. Trade St., Charlotte, North Carolina
- Coordinates: 35°14′37″N 80°51′25″W
- Area: less than one acre
- Built: 1883
- Architectural style: Romanesque
- NRHP reference No.: 75001281
- Added to NRHP: October 14, 1975

Biddle Memorial Hall is a historic building on the campus of Johnson C. Smith University in Charlotte, Mecklenburg County, North Carolina. It was built in 1883, and is a 3 1/2-story, five bay Romanesque-style brick and stone building on a raised basement. It features an elaborate clock tower named Big Johnson, known as the tallest clock tower that plays the Westminster Chimes every 15 minutes to mark the passing of time in the Charlotte Uptown area. Which can be heard a mile away. With a pyramidal slate roof and baritizans at each corner. It was built as the main building for the school established in 1867 by the Presbyterian church for the education of African-American students. It was named in 1923 to honor Mary D. Biddle who donated $1,400 to the school.

It was listed on the National Register of Historic Places in 1975.
