= David Bryant Fulton =

American writer (1863–1941)

David Bryant Fulton (1863 – November 14, 1941) was an American writer, who wrote about the experiences and aspirations of African Americans. He also used the pseudonym Jack Thorne.

== Life and career ==
David Bryant Fulton was born in 1863, in Fayetteville, North Carolina, to parents Benjamin and Lavinia Robinson Fulton. He attended Williston School in Wilmington, North Carolina. Fulton also attended Gregory Institute. He moved to New York City and worked as a porter for the Pullman Palace Car Company. The New York Public Library has a collection of papers related to him. He wrote about his experiences as a porter for Pullman.

Fulton wrote for the Wilmington Record. He moved to the Brooklyn neighborhood of Charlotte, North Carolina.

Fulton wrote several poems. In 1912 the Negro Society for Historical Research published one of his writings. Virginia Moore Fulton was his first wife. His second marriage was to Katie Gummer.

== Writings ==
- Recollections of a Sleeping Car Porter, using the pseudonym Jack Thorne
- Hanover, or the Persecution of the Lowly, A Story of the Wilmington Massacre (1900), a novel
- Eagle Clippings
- A Plea for Social Justice for the Negro Woman, an 11-page pamphlet
- "Race Unification; How It May Be Accomplished", published in a British periodical (1913)
- Henry Berry Lowery, the North Carolina Outlaw, published in The Citizen

== See also ==
- Wilmington massacre
