= David Fulton Publishers =

David Fulton Publishers is a book publisher in the United Kingdom, founded in 1987 that specialises in education. It publishes a portfolio of textbooks for trainee teachers, practical books for classroom practitioners, and research and scholarly books for the international academic community.

This company was acquired by Routledge (part of the Taylor & Francis Group) in 2006.
