= Fort Valley High and Industrial School =

School in Fort Valley, Georgia (1890–1939)

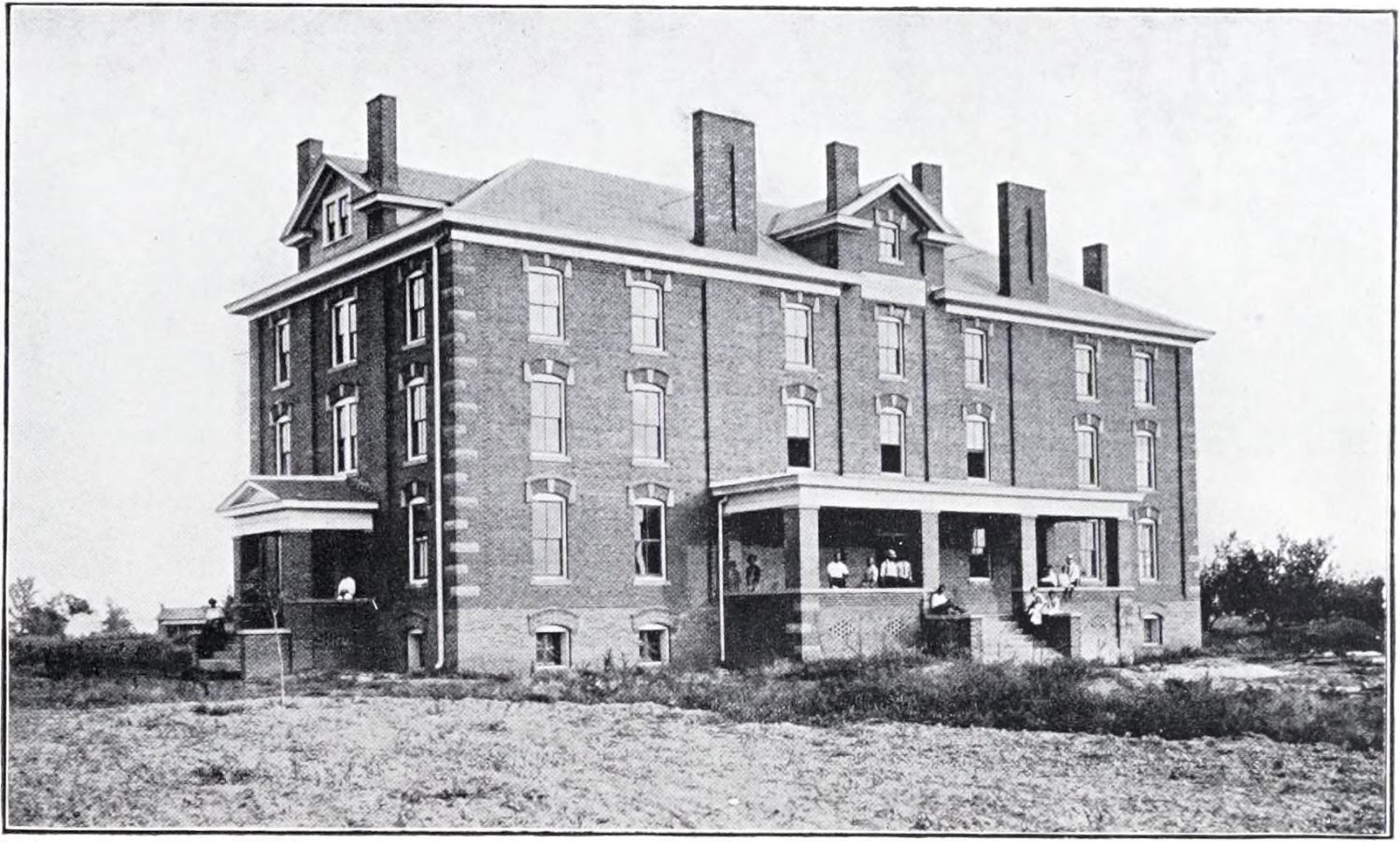
- Collis P. Huntington Memorial Hall
- Fort Valley, Georgia, United States

Information
- Other name: Fort Valley Normal and Industrial School
- School type: Private Black elementary, secondary, normal school, industrial school
- Religious affiliation: Episcopal Church
- Founded: 1890
- Founder: J. W. Davison
- Closed: April 1939
- Followed by: Fort Valley State College

Fort Valley High and Industrial School (1890 – 1939), also known as Fort Valley Normal and Industrial School, was a private elementary, secondary and normal school for African American students in Fort Valley, Georgia, affiliated with the American Church Institute of the Protestant Episcopal Church. It was a Rosenwald school.

In 1939, the school was consolidated into Fort Valley State College (now Fort Valley State University) by the State of Georgia.

== History ==
Fort Valley High and Industrial School was opened in 1890, and chartered in 1896. It was founded by J. W. Davison. Some of the school's financial endowment was donated by the Slater Fund. In 1931, the Rosenwald Fund also donated to the school.

The first school building was completed in 1895 and also used as an Odd Fellows' Hall, and was a two-story frame structure built and paid for by the local Black community. By 1910, the campus sat on 35 acres (14 ha) and consisted of 8 buildings, the largest of which was Collis P. Huntington Memorial Hall.

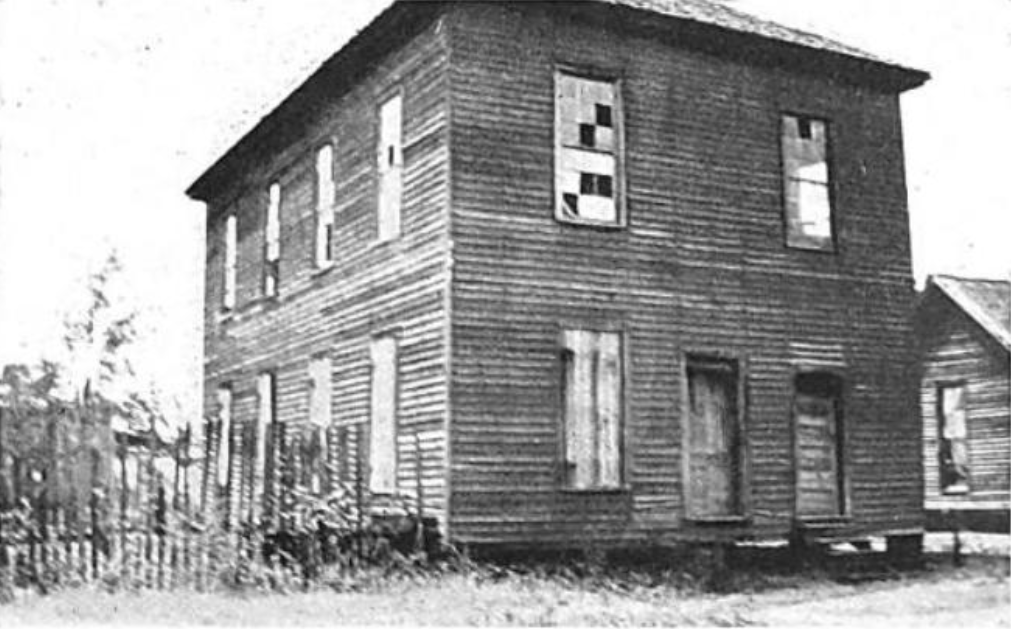
Original building for Fort Valley High and Industrial School, and Odd Fellow's Hall (1895–1925)

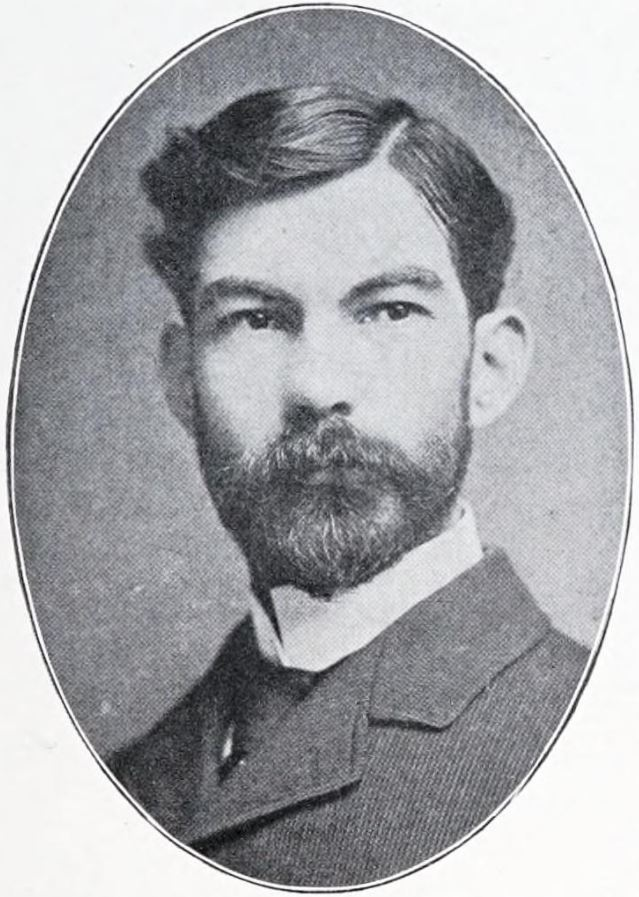
Henry Alexander Hunt, the principal from 1904 to 1938

The programs offered included grammar school-level primary education, teaching education (normal school), and industrial school coursework including sewing, handicrafts, cooking, printmaking, carpentry, blacksmithing, and farming.

Student enrollment varied seasonally based on the local cotton farms' schedule.

The early years of the Fort Valley High and Industrial School involved financial struggle, and they had difficulties with staffing teachers. During the first two years of the school, the student enrollment was around 250 students, with only two teachers. In order to hire more teachers, the school posted the teaching roles and fundraised in New England, New York, and Chicago. Notable teachers included J. H. Torburt, Inez P. Brockway, and C. B. Johnson.

Principals of the school included John W. Davison (J. W. Davison), and Henry Alexander Hunt (H. A. Hunt). Hunt served as the second principal from 1904 to 1938. He was born in 1886 in Sparta, Georgia, and was a 1890 graduate of Atlanta University.

== Closure and legacy ==
Principal Hunt died on October 1, 1938, in Washington, D.C. He was buried on the campus, and a painted portrait of Hunt by artist Dean Aaron Brown was donated to the school in his honor a few months after.

In April 1939, the State of Georgia took over the leadership of the school, and by October 1939 it was transformed into a college campus. The Fort Valley High and Industrial School and the State Teachers and Agricultural College for Negroes in Forsyth, Georgia were both consolidated at the same time to form the Fort Valley State College (now Fort Valley State University) with Horace Mann Bond as its president.

== See also ==
- List of Rosenwald schools
