= List of African American newspapers in North Carolina =

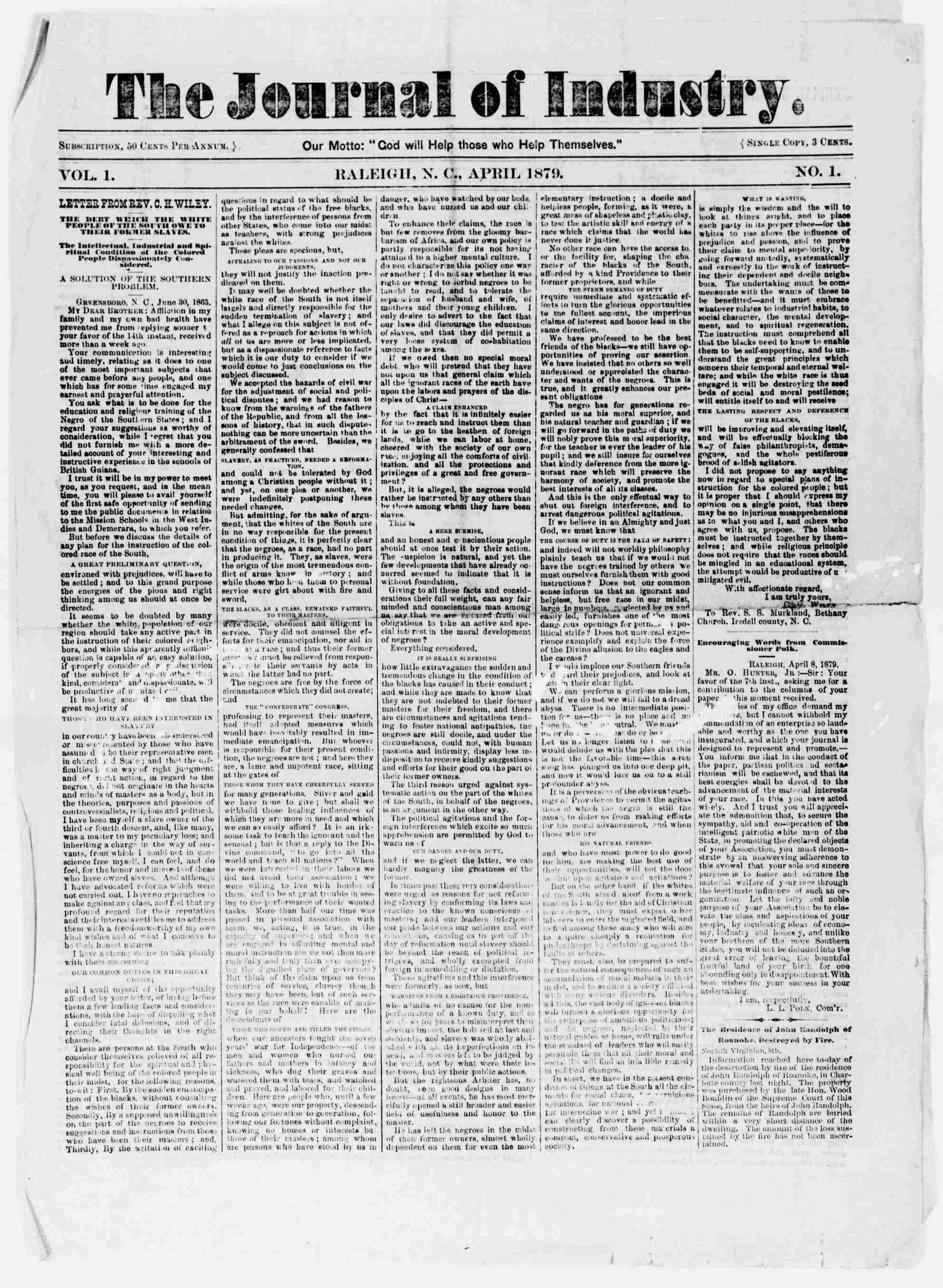
Inaugural issue of the Raleigh Journal of Industry in 1879.

This is a list of African American newspapers that have been published in North Carolina. It includes both current and historical newspapers. The first such newspaper in North Carolina was the Journal of Freedom of Raleigh, which published its first issue on September 30, 1865. The African American press in North Carolina has historically been centered on a few large cities such as Raleigh, Durham, and Greensboro.

== Newspapers ==
City	Title	Beginning	End	Frequency	Call numbers	Remarks
Asheville	The Asheville Advocate	1987	?	Weekly or biweekly	LCCN sn97064608; OCLC 38532791, 26377080	Published by Clarence Benton. Edited by Angelyn Benton and Tony Brown.; Extant through at least 1992.
Asheville	The Church Advocate	1943	1940s	Unknown	LCCN sn98058952; OCLC 38214827	Edited by E.W. Dixon.
Asheville	Freedom's Advocate	1879	Weekly			
Asheville	The Southern News	1936 or 1938	1974	Weekly or monthly	LCCN sn98058951; OCLC 41242346	Published by Eugene Smith.
Asheville	The Southland Advocate	1942	?	Weekly	LCCN sn98058953; OCLC 38214859	Published by F.D. Fitzgerald Home.; Attested from at least 1950.
Asheville	West Asheville News	1942?	?	Weekly	LCCN sn91068042; OCLC 609WESTVIRGINIADIGEST23986937	Published by Walter A. Ward.
Chapel Hill	Black Ink : Black Student Movement, University Of North Carolina At Chapel Hill	1969	2000s	Frequency varies	LCCN 2015236558; OCLC 756860265	Billed as the "Black Student Movement official newspaper".
Chapel Hill	The Protean Radish; Radish (1968–1969)	1968	1970s	Weekly	LCCN sn93065769; OCLC 17736505; Radish: LCCN sn93065768; OCLC 20838455	
Wilmington / Charlotte (1897–)	Africo-American Presbyterian	1879	1939 or 1938	Weekly	LCCN sn84025826; OCLC 10354392	
Charlotte	Messenger	1882			Edited by William Caswell Smith until 1890, and then by A.M. Houston.	
Charlotte	The Metrolinian	1971	1900s	Weekly	LCCN sn99061509; OCLC 38214772	
Charlotte	The Charlotte Post	1918	current	Weekly	LCCN sn88063138; OCLC 17635192, 21337679	Official site; Published by Gerald O. Johnson.
Charlotte	The Queen City Gazette	1963?	1900s	Weekly	LCCN sn99061510; OCLC 38214729	
Charlotte	The Weekly Journal	1978	1900s	Weekly	LCCN sn99061508; OCLC 38214893	Edited by Carnell Midgett.
Concord	Twin-City Weekly	1972	1900s	Weekly	LCCN sn99061511; OCLC 38214687	
Durham	Carolina Times; The Carolina Times	1919	current	Weekly	LCCN sn83045120; OCLC 2259007	Founded by Louis E. Austin.; Known for its outspoken stance against racial injustice and the Ku Klux Klan.
Durham	The Triangle Tribune	1998	current	Weekly	LCCN sn98058877; OCLC 40565647	Official site
Fayetteville	The Fayetteville Black Times	1981?	?	Weekly		Attested through at least 1986.
Fayetteville	The Challenger	1987?	1900s	Weekly	LCCN sn98058918; OCLC 38214520	Published by Sabrina Quatrice Atkinson.; "A people without a voice cannot be heard."; A Wilmington edition was also published.
Fayetteville	The Educator	1874	1875	Weekly	LCCN 2019236894; OCLC 1108754279	Free online archive; Edited by William Caswell Smith.
Fayetteville	The Fayetteville Press	1990	current	Monthly newspaper	LCCN sn98058919; OCLC 38214563	Official site; Published by J.J. Jones.
Forest City	The Carolina News	1952	1900s	Twice monthly	LCCN sn98058906; OCLC 38214323	Founded and edited by M.B. Robinson.
Goldsboro	The Carolina Enterprise	1880s	1883	Weekly	LCCN sn98058832; OCLC 39369829	
Greensboro	African World	1971	1975	Monthly newspaper	LCCN sn92021226; OCLC 5151054	Distinguished by its militant Pan-Africanist politics.
Greensboro	The Carolina Peacemaker	1967	current	Weekly	LCCN sn93065763; OCLC 27183769, 9636324	Official site; Founded by John Marshall Kilimanjaro.
Greensboro	The Future Outlook	1941	1972	Weekly	LCCN sn97064597; OCLC 38214459	Free online archive; Published by J.F. Johnson.; Known for its conservative political stance.
Greenville	The 'M' Voice	1987	1994	Weekly	LCCN sn98058958; OCLC 34374790	Published by Jim Rouse Jr.
Harris	The Harris Herald	1946	1949	Monthly newspapers	LCCN sn98058907; OCLC 38214369	Founded and edited by M.B. Robinson.
High Point	The Tribunal Aid	1973	1976	Weekly	LCCN sn97064595; OCLC 38214189	
Laurinburg	The Laurinburg Post	1895	?	Weekly	LCCN sn91068174; OCLC 24532239	
Lincolnton	The Colored Industrial	1890s	1900s	Semimonthly newspaper	LCCN sn98058874; OCLC 40413138	Attested through at least 1901.
Littleton	The True Reformer	1899	1909	Weekly	LCCN 2013254353, sn83025849; OCLC 848077194, 9841956	Published by The Afro Union Club.
Maxton	The Maxton Blade	1890	1900s	Weekly	LCCN sn92074099; OCLC 26832908	Published by M.B. Company.
New Bern	The Peoples' Advocate	1886	1880s	Weekly	LCCN sn84025895; OCLC 10587961, 14512227	
Raleigh	African Expositor	1800s	1800s	Quarterly	LCCN sn97064613; OCLC 38892755	Attested from at least 1886.
Raleigh	Banner; The Banner-Enterprise (1883–)	1881	1800s	Weekly	LCCN 2018218527; OCLC 1021049893; ISSN 2576-6910	Free online archive; Founded by John H. Williamson.; Official newspaper of the North Carolina Industrial Association.; Absorbed the Goldsboro Enterprise in 1883.
Raleigh	The Carolina Tribune	1928	1941? or 1940	Weekly	LCCN sn92072999; OCLC 25587012	
Raleigh	The Carolinian	1941 or 1940	current	Twice weekly	LCCN sn80008926, sn8008926, 2019236980, sn99061519; OCLC 41401361, 1128868198, 14183143, 2259008; ISSN 0045-5873	Official site
Raleigh	Dispatch: A Carolinian Newspaper	1991	Weekly or twice weekly	LCCN 2011254299; OCLC 747984007, 27977908	Attested through at least 1993.	
Raleigh	Enterprise	1866	1866	Weekly		Founded by L. Branson.
Raleigh	The Gazette	1800s	?	Weekly		
Raleigh	North Carolina Gazette; The Gazette	1884 or 1885	1800s	Weekly	LCCN 2016271219, sn92073076; OCLC 25959539, 962326627; ISSN 2475-0638, 2475-0646; The Gazette: LCCN 2011254384, sn83027097; OCLC 10033391, 764798124; ISSN 2474-3143, 2474-3151	Free online archive (North Carolina Gazette); Free online archive (The Gazette); Published by the North Carolina Industrial Association.; Founded by John H. Williamson. Editorship changed to James H. Harris in 1891 and James H. Young in 1894.
Raleigh	The Raleigh Independent	1916	1900s	Weekly	LCCN sn92072995; OCLC 25587202	
Raleigh	Journal of Freedom	1865	1867	Weekly		Edited by Edward P. Brooks.
Raleigh	The Journal of Industry	1879	?	Weekly	LCCN 2016271218, sn92072981; OCLC 25557526, 962306177; ISSN 2475-0654, 2475-0662	Free online archive; Official newspaper of the North Carolina Industrial Association until 1898.; Edited by brothers Charles N. and Oliver Hunter.
Raleigh	North Carolina Republican	1879	1880	Weekly	LCCN 2016271182, sn85038643; OCLC 12862727, 959404612; ISSN 2474-4492, 2474-4506	Free online archive; Edited by James H. Harris.
Raleigh	The Union Reformer	1926?	?	Twice monthly		Published by the General Baptist State Convention of North Carolina.
Raleigh	The Weekly Republican; Republican	1867	1867	Weekly	LCCN sn85026883; OCLC 12714100	Published by Daniel Battle or by Frank S. Pearson, Jr.
Rocky Mount	Justice Speaks	1982	1990s	Monthly newspaper (except August)	LCCN sn90003614; OCLC 21573844; ISSN 1050-687X	
Salisbury / Charlotte	Star of Zion	1876	current	Weekly		Official site; Official newspaper of the African Methodist Episcopal Zion Church.; Early editors included John C. Dancy and James Walker Hood.; Moved from Charlotte to Salisbury in 1882.
Statesville	Iredell County News; The County News	1982? or 1980	1997	Weekly	LCCN sn89080097; OCLC 24123714	Published by Mason McCullough.
Statesville	The County News	1997	current	Weekly	LCCN sn97064592; OCLC 38255440	Official site
Statesville	Iredell County Post; The Iredell County Post	1980	1980	Weekly	LCCN sn97064596; OCLC 38214087	
Weldon	The N.C. Republican, and Civil Rights Advocate; North Carolina Republican	1884	?	Weekly	LCCN sn83025842; OCLC 9839433	Published and edited by D. McD. Lindsey.; Known for its extensive coverage of international news.
Whiteville	The Afro-chronicle	1972	?	Weekly	LCCN sn98062570; OCLC 40157836	Attested through at least 1975.
Wilmington	Africo-American Presbyterian	1879	1938 or 1939	Weekly	LCCN 2011254019, sn94093044; OCLC 32783035, 707512087	Published at Charlotte from December 1899 to July 1906.
Wilmington	The Banner-Enterprise	1883	1800s	Weekly	LCCN sn87070090, 2015236952; OCLC 16502293, 16117652; ISSN 2576-6902	Official newspaper of the North Carolina Industrial Association.; Published in Wilmington starting March 17, 1884.; Free online archive
Wilmington	The Cape Fear Journal	1900s	1900s	Weekly	LCCN sn98058847; OCLC 40227483	
Wilmington	The Challenger	1988	?	Weekly	LCCN sn99061536; OCLC 29302317; ISSN 1528-7327	Published by Peter Grear and Kathy Davis Grear; edited by Leonard Johnson.; Also published a Fayetteville edition.
Wilmington	The Daily Record	1890s	?	Daily (except Sunday)	LCCN sn92073929, sn94087730; OCLC 25278042, 32423148	Large statewide circulation.
Wilmington	The Wilmington Journal; Cape Fear Journal (1901–1945); The Journal (1994–1996)	1901	current	Weekly	LCCN sn78001825, sn7801825, sn97064584; OCLC 3962050, 34259815; ISSN 0049-7649; The Journal: LCCN sn97064583; OCLC 29748312	Official site; Founded by Robert S. Jervay.
Wilmington	Wilmington Record	1890s	?	Weekly	LCCN sn92074045; OCLC 25911393	
Winston-Salem	Winston-Salem Chronicle	1974	current	Weekly	LCCN sn85042324; OCLC 12156348	Official site
Winston-Salem	The People's Spokesman	1940s	?	Weekly	LCCN sn88063139; OCLC 17635238	
Winston-Salem	The AC Phoenix	1982	current	Monthly newspaper	LCCN 2018236525, 2019236850; OCLC 1062418403, 1082356235	Official site
Winton	The Baptist Pilot	1887	Weekly		Published by the North Carolina Ministerial Union. Edited by Calvin S. Brown.	

== See also ==
- List of African American newspapers and media outlets
- List of African American newspapers in Georgia
- List of African American newspapers in South Carolina
- List of African American newspapers in Tennessee
- List of African American newspapers in Virginia
- List of newspapers in North Carolina

== Works cited ==
- Danky, James Philip; Hady, Maureen E., eds. (1998). African-American newspapers and periodicals : a national bibliography. Harvard University Press. ISBN 9780674007888.
- Suggs, Henry Lewis; Duncan, Bernardine Moses (1983). "North Carolina". In Suggs, Henry Lewis (ed.). The Black Press in the South, 1865–1979. ISBN 9780313222443.
