= NCIA =

NCIA can stand for:

- National Cannabis Industry Association, established in 2010
- NATO Communications and Information Agency, established in 2012
- National Correctional Industries Association, established in 1996
- North Carolina Industrial Association, a civic organization of African Americans in Raleigh, North Carolina that published a newspaper and presented the North Carolina Colored Fair
- Northern Corridor Implementation Authority, responsible for implementing the Northern Corridor Economic Region in Malaysia
