= The Future Outlook =

Newspaper in Greensboro, North Carolina

The Future Outlook was a newspaper for African Americans in Greensboro, North Carolina from 1941-1972. J. F. Johnson was the publisher. The paper covered local people and events in Greensboro, the surrounding area of Guilford County, and subjects of national and international interest. The paper covered the area's schools and colleges including North Carolina A&T and Bennett College. Many editions have been digitzed and are available online.

Around the time the Carolina Times and Wilmington Journal were established, J. F. Johnson launched The Future Outlook. In 1971 its address was listed as 1301 Market Street.

== See also ==
- African American newspapers
- List of African-American newspapers in North Carolina
