= Berry O'Kelly =

American businessman

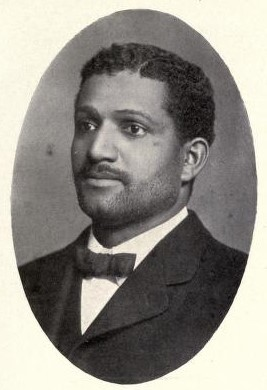
- Berry O'Kelly c. 1919
- Born: c. 1861; Chapel Hill, North Carolina, United States
- Died: March 14, 1931 (aged 69–70); Raleigh, North Carolina
- Occupations: Businessman, postmaster, and philanthropist
- Known for: Development of black commerce in Raleigh

Berry O'Kelly (c. 1861 – March 14, 1931) was an American businessman and philanthropist. He helped spur the development of black commerce in Raleigh and served as the first postmaster of Method. He also donated land for the Berry O'Kelly School.

== Early life ==
Berry O'Kelly was born in Chapel Hill, North Carolina in about 1861. His mother, Frances Stroud, was an enslaved woman who died shortly after his birth. He assumed his name from maternal relatives who oversaw his care. He was educated in a school in Orange County before moving to join relatives in Mason Village, a freedmen's community outside of Raleigh. He continued his education there and worked as a youth driving goods for a white family.

== Career ==
When he was about 22 years of age, O'Kelly was hired as a clerk at a general store in Mason's Village operated by C. N. Woods. Over time he saved $100 and purchased an interest in the business, leading the store to be renamed Woods and O'Kelly. O'Kelly bought out the entire enterprise from Woods when the latter moved to Oklahoma in 1889. The store prospered under his ownership, serving the residents of the local community while also catering to commerce and traffic which flowed along the adjacent Norfolk and Southern Railroad line and Raleigh–Durham road. O'Kelly eventually constructed two warehouses to support the store.

O'Kelly's business interests grew to expand throughout Method and Raleigh. Over the course of his life he acquired significant real estate holdings in both locales. In particular, his real estate development activities along East Hargett Street in Raleigh helped to spur the development of black commerce along the thoroughfare. In about 1910 he joined with grocer John T. Turner in opening the Raleigh Shoe Company along the street. After about 1925, the business was under his sole ownership. He also purchased a building at the corner of East Hargett and Wilmington Street and leased it to various black businesses. Among his other business activities, he served as president of the Acme Realty Company, chaired the board of the Eagle Life Insurance Company, and held stock in the Raleigh Independent, a black community newspaper published between 1917 and 1926. He also supported efforts of the Mechanics and Farmers Bank to establish a branch in Raleigh and thereafter served as the branch manager.

In 1890, the U.S. federal government established a post office at O'Kelly's store in Mason Village, renamed Method. O'Kelly was appointed the first postmaster of the office on October 9 and continuously served in that capacity until his death. While politically nonpartisan, he involved himself in public affairs and supported various candidates and bond issues. Additionally, O'Kelly was a member of St. James's African Methodist Episcopal Church in Method, serving as a teacher in the Sunday school and a lay member of the North Carolina General A.M.E. Conference.

O'Kelly developed an interest in educational issues. As chair of a local school committee, he worked with Charles Norfleet Hunter to support efforts at modernizing the school facilities in Method. Securing funds for new construction from Julius Rosenwald, O'Kelly donated 10 acres of land and new facilities were built. The institution eventually became known as the Berry O'Kelly School.

== Later life ==
O'Kelly grew ill in February 1931. He died on March 14, 1931 at St. Agnes Hospital in Raleigh and was buried in the St. James A.M.E. Church's graveyard. His store buildings were later demolished. The school bearing his name operated until 1966.

== Works cited ==
- Cauthen, Carmen (2023). Historic Black Neighborhoods of Raleigh (American Heritage ed.). Arcadia Publishing. ISBN 9781439676806.
- Clement, Richardson, ed. (1919). The National Cyclopedia of the Colored Race. Montgomery, AL: National Publishing Company.
- Haley, John H. (2014). Charles N. Hunter and Race Relations in North Carolina. Chapel Hill: The University of North Carolina Press. ISBN 9781469617060.
- Justesen, Benjamin R. (2005). "Black Tip, White Iceberg: Black Postmasters and the Rise of White Supremacy in North Carolina, 1897–1901". The North Carolina Historical Review. 82 (2): 193–227. JSTOR 23523507.
- Parramore, Thomas C. (1983). Express Lanes & Country Roads: The Way We Lived in North Carolina, 1920-1970. Vol. 5. North Carolina Department of Cultural Resources. ISBN 9780807815533.
