= Daniel J. Sanders =

African American educator, editor, and pastor

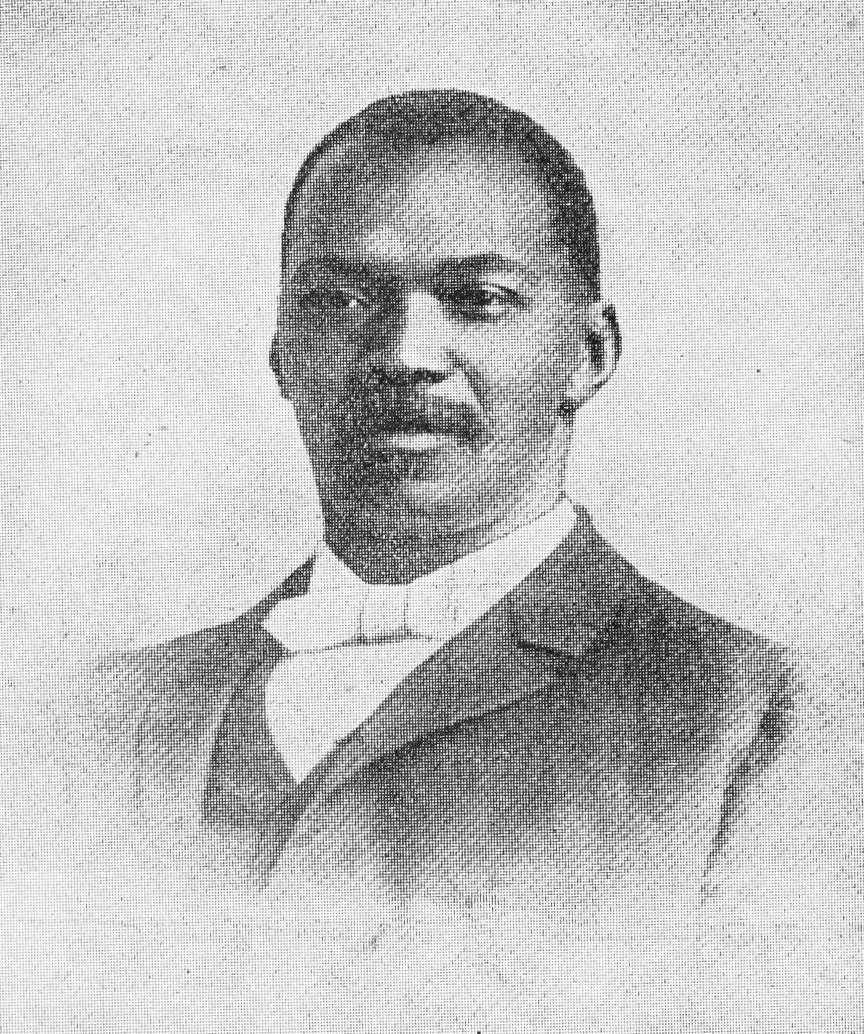

President of Johnson C. Smith University
- In office October 12, 1891 – March 6 1907
- Preceded by: Rev. William F. Johnson
- Succeeded by: Dr. Henry L. McCrorey

Personal details
- Born: Daniel Jackson Sanders; February 15, 1847 Winnsboro, South Carolina, U.S.
- Died: March 6, 1907 (aged 60) Charlotte, North Carolina, U.S.
- Education: Brainerd Institute; Western Theological Seminary
- Occupation: Clergyman, newspaper publisher, educator

Daniel Jackson Sanders (February 15, 1847 – March 6, 1907) was an American clergyman, academic administrator, and newspaper publisher. He served as president of Biddle University (now Johnson C. Smith University) in North Carolina for seventeen years, becoming one of the most prominent Black educators in the South. He had various positions of importance with the Presbyterian Church of the United States and was considered the leading Black Presbyterian minister in the United States when he died. Sanders also established, edited, and published the Africo-American Presbyterian newspaper.

== Early life ==
Sanders was born a slave near Winnsboro, South Carolina on February 15, 1847. His parents were Laura and William Sanders, who were enslaved by Reverend Thomas Hall and Major Samuel Barkley, respectively. When Barkley died, he left his estate, including enslaved people, to Barkley. Barkley allowed Sanders to learn the alphabet and also taught him his trade of shoemaking, starting at the age of nine years. When Sanders was freed by the Emancipation Proclamation in 1863, he could read and spell.

When he was nineteen years old, Sanders left Winnsboro in March 1866 and worked as a shoemaker in Chester, South Carolina. He enrolled in the Red Oak Academy. There, he met John and William Knox, white brothers who were a teacher and student at Red Oak Academy; the brothers tutored Sanders in arithmetic, geography, grammar, Greek, history, and Latin. This prepared Saunders to enroll in the Brainerd Institute, a Presbyterian normal and industrial school for Blacks that that opened in Chester in 1868. Sanders graduated from the institute after two years and started working as a tutor there in 1870. Later, he was the principal of a public school for Black students in Chester.

In 1870, the Fairfield Presbytery licensed Sanders as a minister in the northern branch of the Presbyterian Church of the United States. He enrolled in the Western Theological Seminary in Allegheny, Pennsylvania in 1871, graduating with honors in Hebrew and Sanskrit in 1874.

== Career ==
Sander became a pastor at the First Presbyterian Church (Colored), also known as the Chestnut Street Presbyterian Church, in Wilmington, North Carolina in 1874. He was appointed temporary clerk of the Atlantic Synod in December 1874. From 1875 to 1890, he also worked as the principal of Wilmington's school for Black children. He left both positions in 1876 to become a fundraiser for the Presbyterian Board of Missions for Freedmen in Scotland and England. He returned to Wilmington after more than a year having secured $6,120.17 for to Biddle University, which was located in Charlotte, North Carolina. In 1878, Sander was appointed to the board of directors of Biddle University, serving in this capacity for the next fourteen years. He also resumed his position as the pastor at the Chestnut Street Presbyterian Church in 1878.

On January 1, 1879, Sanders established the Africo-American Presbyterian newspaper and served as its editor and publisher until he died. The newspaper was initially published twice month but expanded to weekly. Sanders published articles and editorials that highlighted racial injustice and violence, while endorsing the teachings of the Presbyterian Church. Africo-American Presbyterian was published until 1939 when it merged with The Southern Evangelist.

In 1891, Sanders left Wilmington and became the pastor of the Pilgrims' Chapel Church and Chadbourn Presbyterian Church. Sanders became the first Black president of Biddle University (now Johnson C. Smith University) on October 12, 1891, and served in that capacity for seventeen years. Under his leadership, the campus expanded by sixty acres, the first Black intercollegiate football game was played (between Biddle and Livingstone College), and the number of annual graduates increased threefold. One of his efforts was to address the university library, most of which had been lost in a fire. In 1904, Sanders contacted his friend, Booker T. Washington, who connected him with Andrew Carnegie. After Sanders and Washington visited Carnegie in Pittsburgh, Carnegie donated $12,500 for to build a library for the university. Sanders also established an academic relationship with eighteen affiliate schools, which served as "feeder schools" for the university. While he was president of Biddle, Sanders taught Hebrew, systematic theology, and church government in the university's theology school. He became one of the most prominent Black educators in the South.

Sanders served on the Presbyterian Assembly three times and was appointed to the Detroit Assembly. He was a delegate to the Presbyterian Ecumenical Council that met in Toronto, Canada in September 1892. He was a delegate to the Pan-Presbyterian Alliance in England in 1895. He was also the first Black moderator of the Yadkin Presbytery and the Cape Fear Presbyterian and was also the clerk of the Atlantic Presbytery, the Yadkin Presbytery, and the Catawba Synod. He was considered the leading Black Presbyterian minister in the United States when he died.

== Honors ==
Sanders received an honorary Master of Arts and Doctor of Divinity from Lincoln University of Pennsylvania. He also received an honorary Doctor of Divinity from Biddle University.

== Personal life ==
Sanders married Fannie Price on September 16, 1880. The couple had nine children.

Sanders became ill with gastritis and la grippe on December 1, 1906. He died at his home on the Biddle University campus on March 6, 1907, at the age of 61 years. His funeral was held at Biddle University on March 8, 1907. Sanders was buried in Pinewood Cemetery (now the Ninth Street Cemetery) in Charlotte. The Color Minister's Union of Charlotte held a memorial service for Sanders on March 19, 1907. Sanders' estate was valued at $25,000 ($895,833 in 2024 dollars), including real estate, personal property, furniture, stocks, and life insurance.
