= Carolina College (Maxton, North Carolina) =

- Motto: "We can and we will"
- Type: Private
- Active: 1912–1926
- Location: Maxton, North Carolina, United States; 34.736°N 79.358°W
- Colors: Purple and white

Carolina College was a Methodist college for women which operated in Maxton, North Carolina, from 1912 to 1926. The college offered the Bachelor of Arts (B. A.) degree until 1919, at which time it became a junior college offering only the Associate of Arts (A. A.) degree. Financial difficulties forced the closure of the institution in 1926. The property later became Presbyterian Junior College (which moved to Laurinburg, North Carolina and became St. Andrews Presbyterian College) and then Carolina Military Academy. A 1973 fire at the then-closed Carolina Military Academy destroyed the main building.

== History ==
As early as 1906 the North Carolina Conference of the Methodist Episcopal Church, South, recommended that a "seminary for girls" should be established in Maxton, North Carolina. Not until the Annual Conference meeting in November 1909, however, did the church actually declare the following:

A. P. Tyer introduced the following resolution which was adopted.
... WHEREAS, we believe in the equal education of our daughters with our sons;
AND WHEREAS, among the many excellent schools which we have for our daughters in the bounds of Southern Methodism, but few of them have standards equal to our colleges for our sons: therefore, be it
RESOLVED, that a commission consisting of seven members of our church be appointed by the Conference to take into consideration the founding of a high-grade college for women, the same to be the property of the Methodist Episcopal Church, South and under the control of this Conference.
And the said Commission is hereby authorized to hear propositions and to prepare plans and to report to this Conference at its next session.

(Signed)

J. F. Bruton
R. B. John
J. G. Brown, J. F. Bruton, R. B. John, G. F. Smith, H. M. North, J. N. Cole, J. S. Wynne were appointed members of the commission called for in the above resolution.

In 1911 Rev. S. E. Mercer was appointed president. In 1912, after years of fundraising by devoted Methodists in the North Carolina cotton belt, the college opened with 40 students. A year later the school had fourteen teachers and eighty-seven students. Courses were offered in literature, music, voice, art, business, Bible, and physical culture.

In 1916 Rev. Mercer resigned and Rev. R.B. John was appointed president of Carolina College. The first years of World War I had taken a toll on enrollment but by 1918 the number of students rebounded. In 1919 Carolina College began offering only the A. A. degree, rather than a B.A. In 1922 Rev. John was succeeded by Mr. Ernest J. Green.

Mr. Green resigned in the summer of 1926, and the North Carolina Christian Advocate reported that Dr. J. Allen Hunter had been appointed to replace him (August 5, 1926). However, in November 1926 the Journal of the North Carolina Conference (of the Methodist Episcopal Church, South) reported that "When the trustees canvassed the situation in August, they found it too late to secure a president and faculty, so they decided not to open the doors for this year."

The institution subsequently went into receivership. The property was purchased by the Synod of the Presbyterian Church and became Presbyterian Junior College (PJC). PJC merged with Flora MacDonald College in 1958 and moved to Laurinburg to become St. Andrews Presbyterian College. Carolina Military Academy later purchased the site. A 1973 fire at the then-closed Carolina Military Academy destroyed the main building.
