= Journal of Freedom =

Defunct African American newspaper in North Carolina

The Journal of Freedom was the first African American newspaper in North Carolina. It was founded on September 30, 1865, and dissolved the next month. Edward P. Brooks, a white journalist and former member of the Union Army, was its editor.

== Background and publication ==
Edward P. Brooks was a white journalist who worked at the Daily Progress of Raleigh and as a correspondent for The New York Times and served in the Union Army during the American Civil War.

The Journal of Freedom was first published as a weekly newspaper on September 30, 1865, by Edward P. Brooks in Raleigh. The paper was established for the freedpeople of the state – black North Carolinans who were recently freed from slavery in the aftermath of the Civil War – and it was the first African American newspaper in North Carolina. It advocated for the civil rights of African Americans, especially universal suffrage for men. It was Republican in its political orientation. The political mission of the paper was opposed by the Daily Progress; the writer of one article stated "we are opposed to the extension of the right of suffrage to the blacks", while it also wished Brooks financial success "as a friend".

Subscriptions to the paper cost $4 per year, and it had perhaps 1,000 subscribers. It was supported by those attending the 1865 North Carolina freedmen convention. The convention called for freedpeople to support the paper, but it dissolved on October 28, 1865. It was succeeded by several other newspapers for North Carolina's black community, including the Raleigh Enterprise (founded in 1866), the African Expositor (1877), and the Journal of Freedom (1879).
