= Maxton, North Carolina =

Town in North Carolina, United States Maxton

- Town
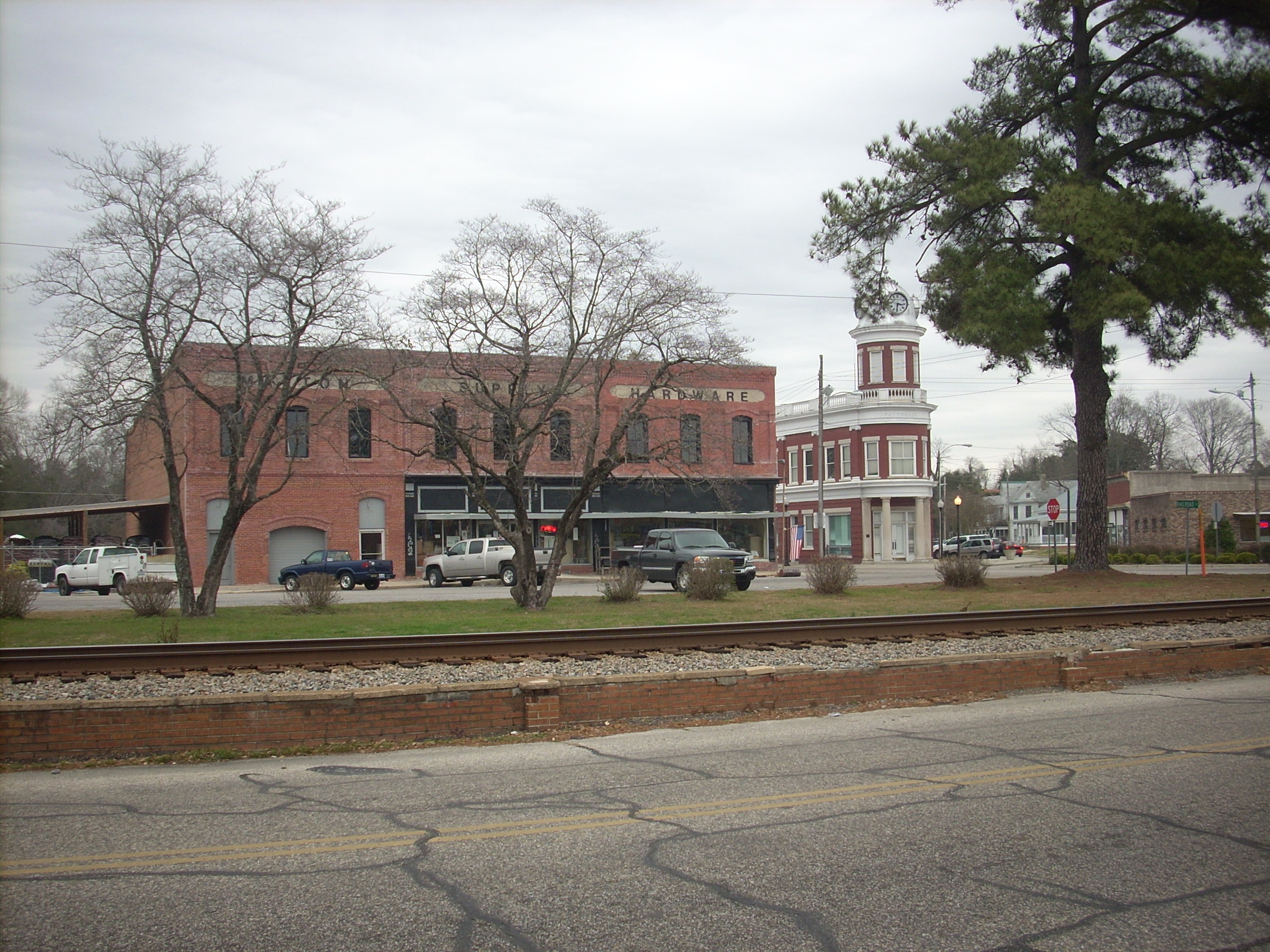
- Downtown Maxton

- Location within the state of North Carolina
- Coordinates: 34°44′9″N 79°20′57″W
- Country: United States
- State: North Carolina
- Counties: Robeson, Scotland
- Incorporated: 1874

Government
  - Type: Town Council
  - Mayor: Christopher Bethea-McDougal

Area
  - Total: 2.70 sq mi (6.99 km^{2})
  - Land: 2.70 sq mi (6.99 km^{2})
  - Water: 0 sq mi (0.00 km^{2})
- Elevation: 197 ft (60 m)

Population (2020)
  - Total: 2,110
  - Density: 782.0/sq mi (301.94/km^{2})
- Time zone: UTC-5 (Eastern (EST))
  - Summer (DST): UTC-4 (EDT)
- ZIP code: 28364
- Area codes: 910, 472
- FIPS code: 37-42020
- Website: www.ci.maxton.nc.us

Maxton is a town in Robeson and Scotland counties, North Carolina, United States. The population was 2,110 at the 2020 census.

== History ==
The Maxton area was first settled in the 18th century. The community was incorporated in 1874 under the name of Shoe Heel. The name changed to Tilden, in honor of 1876 U.S. President candidate Samuel J. Tilden. The name reverted to Shoe Heel in 1881, before finally settling on Maxton in 1887.

As the agriculture industry consolidated into larger corporate ventures in the 1960s, Maxton's status as a local market town declined. Located west of Interstate 95, its economy continued to wane in the following decades without the arrival of new industry. White people began leaving in search of better prospects, leading Maxton to become a majority-black town by 2000. With a newly elected government comprising many black officials, the town began expanding its incorporated limits to include many old black neighborhoods. In 2004, a highway bypass around the town was completed, depriving local businesses of the spending of travelers they had previously enjoyed.

The Maxton Historic District was listed on the National Register of Historic Places in 1999.

=== Educational institutions ===
Maxton is the location of several former, but historically important schools.

Charles N. Hunter a famous African-American educator who would go on to found the North Carolina Industrial Association opened his first school in Maxton.

Carolina College was a Methodist college for women which operated in Maxton, North Carolina, from 1912 to 1926.

Carolina Military Academy was a military school for boys (7th - 12th grade + post graduate) which operated in Maxton, North Carolina, from 1963 to 1972. The school opened it doors to female day students during the 1970 - 1971 school year.

=== Battle of Hayes Pond ===
In January 1958, the Ku Klux Klan burned crosses on the lawns of two Lumbee families. A few nights later, on January 18, 1958, the Lumbee surrounded and disrupted a public Klan rally near Maxton, dispersing the Klansmen, some of whom left under police protection while others escaped into the woods. The confrontation made national headlines, and the Klan never again held a public rally in Robeson County, even as they gained influence over the next decade in North Carolina. The Lumbee refer to the event as the Battle of Hayes Pond and celebrate it as a holiday.

== Geography ==
According to the United States Census Bureau, the town has a total area of 2.2 square miles (5.7 km^{2}), all land.

== Demographics ==
Historical population
Census	Pop.	Note	%±
1890	694		—
1900	935		34.7%
1910	1,321		41.3%
1920	1,397		5.8%
1930	1,386		−0.8%
1940	1,656		19.5%
1950	1,974		19.2%
1960	1,755		−11.1%
1970	1,885		7.4%
1980	2,711		43.8%
1990	2,373		−12.5%
2000	2,551		7.5%
2010	2,426		−4.9%
2020	2,110		−13.0%
U.S. Decennial Census

=== 2020 census ===
As of the 2020 census, Maxton had a population of 2,110. The median age was 38.5 years. 25.6% of residents were under the age of 18 and 19.3% of residents were 65 years of age or older. For every 100 females there were 79.6 males, and for every 100 females age 18 and over there were 75.7 males age 18 and over.

0.0% of residents lived in urban areas, while 100.0% lived in rural areas.

There were 858 households in Maxton, of which 32.1% had children under the age of 18 living in them. Of all households, 26.2% were married-couple households, 19.3% were households with a male householder and no spouse or partner present, and 48.1% were households with a female householder and no spouse or partner present. About 32.7% of all households were made up of individuals and 13.4% had someone living alone who was 65 years of age or older.

There were 1,061 housing units, of which 19.1% were vacant. The homeowner vacancy rate was 5.2% and the rental vacancy rate was 9.9%.

Maxton racial composition
Race	Num.	Perc.
White (non-Hispanic)	357	16.92%
Black or African American (non-Hispanic)	1,287	61.0%
Native American	352	16.68%
Asian	9	0.43%
Pacific Islander	1	0.05%
Other/Mixed	73	3.46%
Hispanic or Latino	31	1.47%

=== 2000 census ===
As of the census of 2000, there were 2,551 people, 985 households, and 676 families residing in the town. The population density was 1,145.3 inhabitants per square mile (442.2/km^{2}). There were 1,073 housing units at an average density of 481.7 units per square mile (186.0 units/km^{2}). The racial makeup of the town was 25.52% White, 64.09% African American, 7.02% Native American, 0.31% Asian, 0.16% Pacific Islander, 1.10% from other races, and 1.80% from two or more races. Hispanic or Latino of any race were 1.61% of the population.

There were 985 households, out of which 31.7% had children under the age of 18 living with them, 36.3% were married couples living together, 28.4% had a female householder with no husband present, and 31.3% were non-families. 27.9% of all households were made up of individuals, and 11.7% had someone living alone who was 65 years of age or older. The average household size was 2.58 and the average family size was 3.16.

In the town, the population was spread out, with 29.3% under the age of 18, 9.1% from 18 to 24, 26.0% from 25 to 44, 22.7% from 45 to 64, and 12.9% who were 65 years of age or older. The median age was 34 years. For every 100 females, there were 84.1 males. For every 100 females age 18 and over, there were 78.0 males.

The median income for a household in the town was $23,143, and the median income for a family was $30,039. Males had a median income of $27,259 versus $20,218 for females. The per capita income for the town was $12,783. About 23.7% of families and 28.5% of the population were below the poverty line, including 43.4% of those under age 18 and 22.3% of those age 65 or over.

== Notable people ==
- Allen LaGrant "Mickey" Bowers (1949–), retired American professional baseball player, scout, coach and manager
- Effie Neal Jones (1919–2002), civil rights activist, Food Services Director, and Counselor for the Four County Head Start Program
- Angus McLean (1870–1935), Governor of North Carolina 1924–1928
- Malcolm ("Malcom") McLean (1913–2001), trucking industry innovator and "father of containerization"
- Gilbert Brown Patterson (1863–1922), American politician and a member of the United States House of Representatives from North Carolina
- Alice B. Russell (1889–1985), singer and actress, married to Oscar Micheaux

== Works cited ==
- Sider, Gerald M. (2015). Race Becomes Tomorrow: North Carolina and the Shadow of Civil Rights. Duke University Press. ISBN 978-0-8223-7504-3.
