= Charles Norfleet Hunter =

American journalist

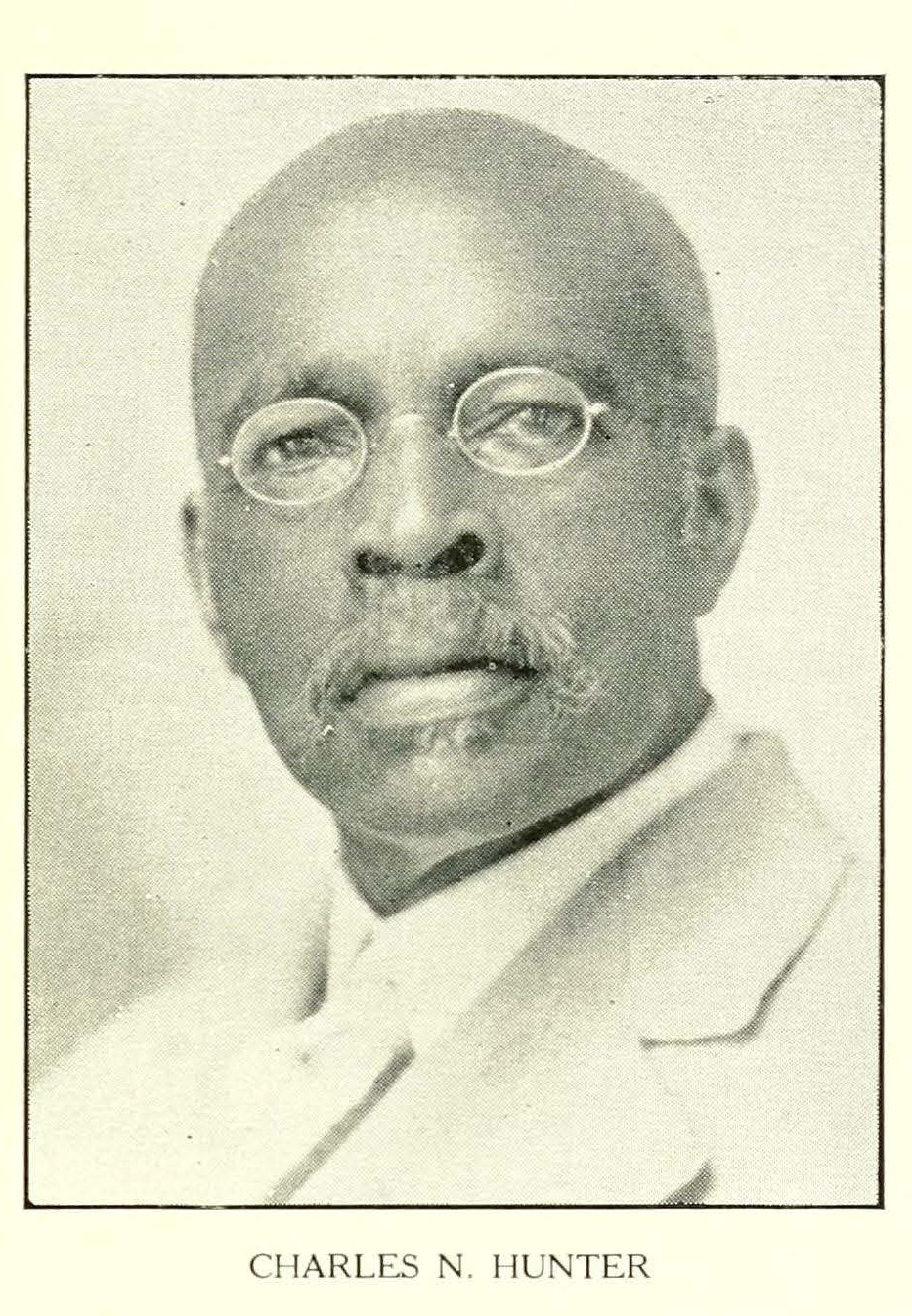
Black educator, journalist, and historian

Charles Norfleet Hunter (January 9, ca. 1852 – September 4, 1931) was an American educator, journalist, and historian. Hunter actively engaged in several late nineteenth-century reform movements. In the 1870s, he participated in the Temperance movement. Beginning in his twenties, Hunter played a significant role as a teacher or principal at the "Colored Graded Schools" in Durham, Goldsboro, and Raleigh as well as at rural schools in Robeson, Chatham, Cumberland, and Johnston Counties. Hunter also helped lead an initiative to build the Berry O'Kelly Training School (previously known as the Method School) in Method, North Carolina.

A prolific writer, Hunter authored numerous letters to the editor, and he frequently corresponded with local and national political figures and family members. He was a pioneering publisher of newspapers for Black North Carolinians. In the late 1870s, he created the North Carolina Industrial Association with his brother Osborne Hunter, Jr. and together they produced the Journal of Industry. Later, he edited the Progressive Educator for the N.C. State Teachers' Association, an organization that supported Black educators. When he moved to Goldsboro, he edited The Appeal for African American readers. Additionally, he wrote letters to the editor for The New National Era (Washington, D.C.) and authored content for the Gazette (Raleigh) and Independent (Raleigh), two papers targeted towards a Black audience. Throughout his life, Hunter used his journalistic voice to illuminate the challenges emancipated Blacks experienced during Reconstruction and in the early-twentieth century with regard to voting rights, lynching, economic progress, and education.

== Early life ==
Charles Norfleet Hunter was born on January 9, circa 1852 in Raleigh, North Carolina. He was about 12 years old when he and his family experienced emancipation from slavery. In the antebellum years, Charles’ father Osborne Hunter, Sr. was an artisan, carpenter and millwright who “hired his own time” from his master and his wife's master, William Dallas Haywood, one-time Raleigh mayor and prominent land and slave owner. While his mother was living, Hunter, his brother Osborne, and two sisters lived with their parents on the northwest corner of Jones and Dawson Streets, Raleigh, North Carolina. After his mother's death in 1855, Hunter's family moved into the “family home of our owners” where Charles and his siblings received care from their enslaved Aunt Harriet. Charles remembered his Aunt Harriet as a “exceptionally intelligent woman” who like several other family members on his maternal side, had become a “fluent reader” and a good writer “before the surrender.” This achievement of literacy was especially remarkable given that the North Carolina statutes from 1832 through the 1854 revision (R.S. c.34, s.74) stated that it was a crime to teach "or attempt to teach'" a slave to read or write or "sell or give him any book or pamphlet.”

After the Civil War, Hunter received an education in the Freedmen's schools in Raleigh. In 1874, he became the Assistant Cashier at the Raleigh branch of the Freedman's Saving Bank. After the bank failed, Hunter served as chief clerk in the assessor's office of the Internal Revenue Service for several southern states. In 1875, Hunter began his teaching career by teaching Black students in Shoe Heel, North Carolina (now called Maxton, NC) in Robeson County. Eventually, Hunter would teach in the city schools of Durham, Goldsboro and Raleigh and rural schools in Wake, Chatham, and Johnston counties. He served as Principal of the Garfield School in 1890. For a brief period, Hunter worked as mail carrier for the post office. With the assistance of Republican congressman James Edward O’Hara from North Carolina's "Black second district," Hunter assumed the position of Postmaster of Raleigh and was the first Black man to hold this post. After President Grover Cleveland took office, Hunter resigned his Postmaster position and went to work as a traveling agent for the textbook publisher A.S. Barnes where he focused his sales work on schools for African American children.

== Career ==
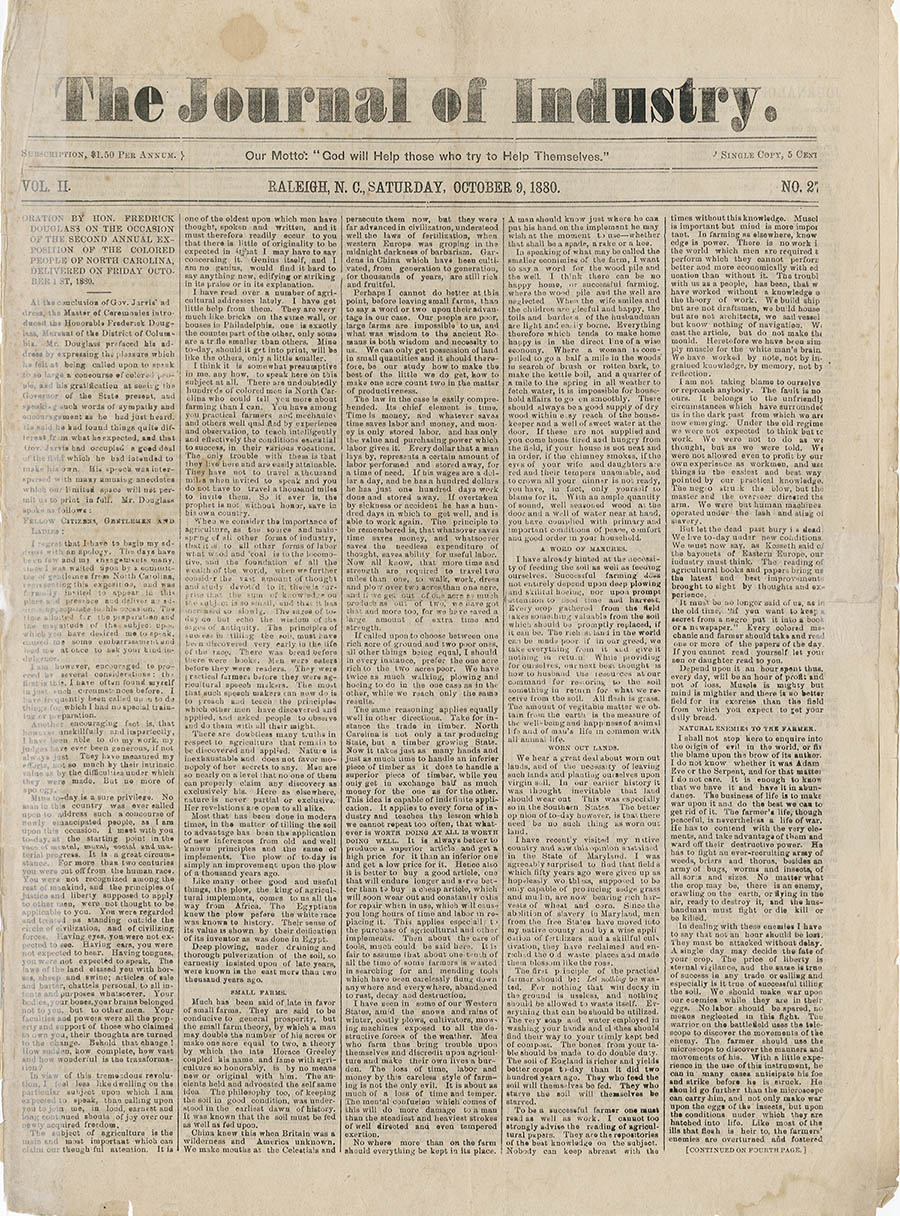
The 9 October 1880 issue of the Journal of Industry edited by Charles Hunter and his brother Osborne Hunter, Jr.. The issue features Frederick Douglass' "Oration on the occasion of the Second Annual Exposition of the Colored People of North Carolina." delivered on October 1, 1880.

Hunter's early venture in newspaper editing was tied to his efforts to create a "State Fair" in North Carolina that would celebrate the economic achievements of Black farmers, homemakers, inventors and entrepreneurs. Together with his brother Osborne Hunter, Jr., the two men created the North Carolina Industrial Fair, an exposition to mark the progress of African Americans in North Carolina. The Journal of Industry, with its motto "God will Help those who try to Help Themselves," promoted the work of the North Carolina Industrial Association. Governor Thomas Jordan Jarvis gave the keynote speech at the "Colored State Fair" in 1879, the first year of the fair, while noted anti-slavery advocate and U.S. Ambassador to Haiti Frederick Douglass served as keynote speaker the following year. In later years, Hunter served as a contributor for the Raleigh Gazette and Raleigh Independent (ca 1917), two papers geared to a Black audience. In the early twentieth century, Charles Hunter began researching the history of the Black community in Raleigh. He published his memoir privately in 1928 under the title Review of Negro Life in North Carolina with My Recollections.

== Personal life ==
Charles Hunter's birthdate varies in the primary sources. The 1870 census suggests he was born in 1851, the 1880 census gives 1852 as a birth year while the 1900 census lists January 1854. Hunter married his wife Eliza Hawkins of Warrenton, N.C. and they had five children four of whom appear in the 1900 census: Emma (b. 1883), Eva (b. 1887), Lena (b.1889), and Charles (b. 1892). Eliza died in 1923. Hunter died in Raleigh on September 4, 1932, and was buried there.
