= Africo-American Presbyterian =

American weekly newspaper (1879–1939)

- Type: Weekly
- Publisher: Africo-American Presbyterian Publishing Company
- Editor: Daniel J. Sanders
- Founded: January 1, 1879
- Ceased publication: September 29, 1938
- Language: English
- Headquarters: Charlotte, North Carolina
- Country: United States
- ISSN: 2835-8759
- OCLC number: 707512087

Africo-American Presbyterian was an American religious weekly newspaper for African American Presbyterians. It was published from 1879 until 1938 by the Africo-American Presbyterian Publishing Company in Charlotte, North Carolina. Its founding editor and publisher was Daniel J. Sanders, a Black Presbyterian minister. The newspaper was not an official publication by the Presbyterian Church; however, it did provide a needed Black perspective and covered many social issues of the era.

== History ==
Africo-American Presbyterian was first published on January 1, 1879. Its founding editor, publisher, and owner was Daniel J. Sanders, a Black Presbyterian minister and educator in Wilmington, North Carolina. Sanders was the editor of the newspaper until his death in 1909.

Africo-American Presbyterian was initially published twice month and consisted of twenty broad columns. By 1892, Africo-American Presbyterian was published weekly by the Africo-American Presbyterian Publishing Company out of Charlotte, North Carolina. The publication moved to Charlotte when Sanders became president of Biddle University.

Africo-American Presbyterian was not an official publication by the Presbyterian Church (PCUSA); however, its content focused on the needs and interests of Black Presbyterians. The church encouraged all Black Presbyterians to subscribe. Africo-American Presbyterian tended to have a "conservative theological stance" and supported loyalty to the standards defined by the Presbyterian Church. Editorially, the newspaper supported missions in Africa, while criticizing the PCUSA for failing to assign a Black missionary to Africa. (Note: PCUSA did not assign a Black missionary to Africa until 1920.)

The Africo-American Presbyterian published articles that highlighted racial injustice and violence. In April 1925, Tuskegee Institute (now Tuskegee University) conducted research and gathered statistics on Black lynchings. In response to the Tuskegee Institute's work, the newspaper's editorial page strongly condemned such acts of violence, meanwhile the PCUSA General Assembly did not take as strong stance at that time. Africo-American Presbyterian also supported Black voting rights, many decades before the 1965 Voting Rights Act. In April 1925, the newspaper provided extensive coverage of racial tensions in Hampton, Virginia.

Africo-American Presbyterian ceased published with volume 59, number 34 on September 29, 1939 and merged with The Southern Evangelist. Digitized versions of the newspaper's issues are available online through the DigitalNC of the University of North Carolina at Chapel Hill, the Chronicling America archives of the Library of Congress, and the Pearl Digital Collection by the Presbyterian Historical Society.

== See also ==
- List of African American newspapers and media outlets
- List of African American newspapers in North Carolina
