= Berry O'Kelly Historic District =

Historic district in North Carolina, United States

- U.S. National Register of Historic Places
- U.S. Historic district
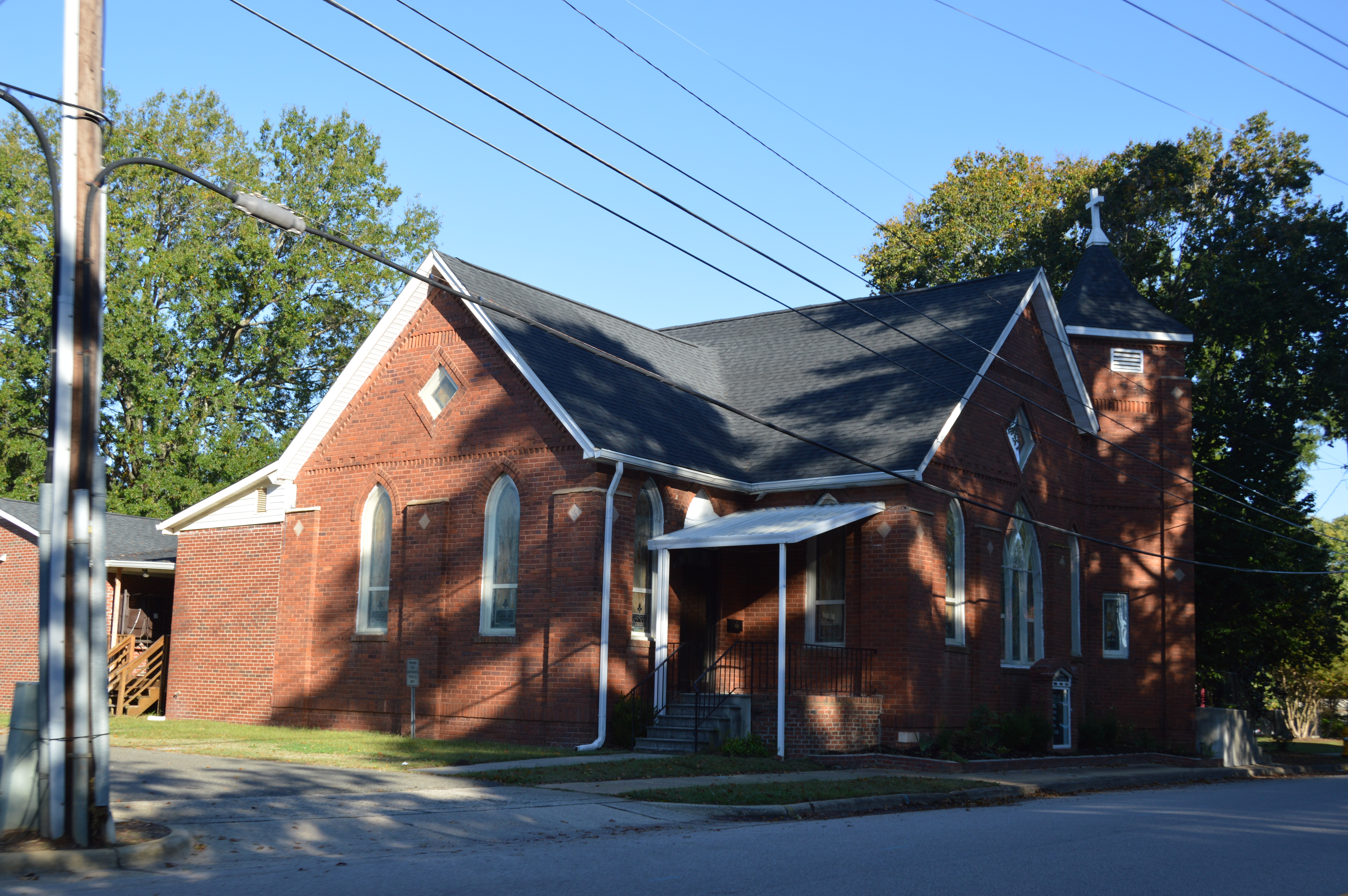
- St. James AME Church

- Location within North Carolina Location within the United States
- Location: 512, 514, and 520 Method Rd., Raleigh, North Carolina
- Coordinates: 35°47′34″N 78°41′40″W
- Area: 8.4 acres (3.4 ha)
- Built: 1860
- NRHP reference No.: 100000941
- Added to NRHP: May 1, 2017

Method is a neighborhood in Raleigh, North Carolina. A former village it was established by emancipated African Americans after the American Civil War. It contains several historic buildings. It includes the Berry O'Kelly Historic District an 8.4 acres (3.4 ha) historic district listed on the National Register of Historic Places in 2017.

== History ==
The settlement which became Method was founded by two half-brothers, Jesse Mason and Isaac O'Kelly in 1872, based on a purchase of 69 acres outside Raleigh. The largely wooded area was sold in plots to Black families, with more than fifty households settled by 1900. The village had by then retail and postal facilities, and two railway stops on the Norfolk and Southern Railroad. The area was initially known as "Mason's Village" and later also known as Slab Town or Planktown (these latter names given by nearby white community members) and Masonville. The name "Method Village" was promoted by local business leader Berry O'Kelly, who had moved from Chapel Hill at the age of 10 and grew up there. As of 1894, there were three schools, and in that year O'Kelly sponsored the development of what became the Berry O’Kelly Training School, an eight-building complex covering elementary to high school, which attracted support from the Sears-Roebuck Foundation (it is now a community center). There was also a church, Saint James A.M.E. O'Kelly served as the Method postmaster from 1890 to 1931.

Method Road was built in 1923. The village was annexed by Raleigh in 1960. A plan to widen a highway through the school site was defeated and the school and then the community received historic designation. A park in the community is named for educator and civil rights leader Harveleigh Monte Rivera White.

== Historic District ==
The Historic District includes the St. James African Methodist Episcopal Church, built in 1923 and extended to the rear in 1999. It is a red brick Gothic Revival building, with brick laid in running bond.

It includes the grave of Berry O'Kelly, with a gravestone giving March 14, 1931 as date of death.

== See also ==
- List of Registered Historic Places in North Carolina
