= John H. Williamson =

American politician

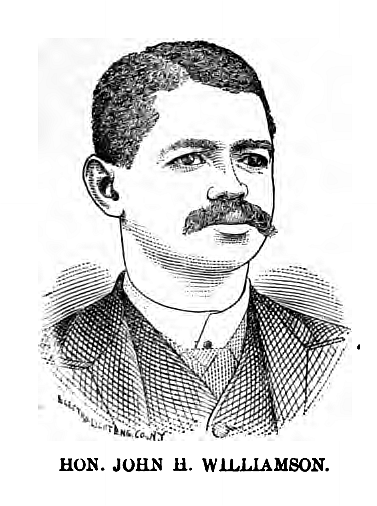
Engraving of John H. Williamson

John H. Williamson (c. 1846–1911) was an African American politician and newspaper publisher in North Carolina. Born in Covington, Georgia, Williamson grew up in Louisburg, North Carolina. He served six terms in the North Carolina General Assembly from 1866 to 1888. In addition to his career as a state politician, Williamson served as justice of the peace, a member of the Franklin County Board of Education. Between 1881 and 1884 Williamson founded two newspapers: The Banner and The North Carolina Gazette. The former was the newspaper of the North Carolina Industrial Association, of which Williamson served as secretary.

Williamson died in Goldsboro, North Carolina on January 9, 1911.

A profile of him is included in the books The Afro-American Press and Its Editors (1891).

== See also ==
- African American officeholders from the end of the Civil War until before 1900
