= Wilmington Journal =

- Type: Weekly newspaper
- Founded: 1927
- City: Wilmington, North Carolina
- Website: wilmingtonjournal.com

The Wilmington Journal is a newspaper in Wilmington, North Carolina. It is North Carolina's oldest existing newspaper for African Americans. R. S. Jervay established the paper in 1927. It continued under his son Thomas C. Jervay Sr.

== History ==
It succeeded the Daily Record, which was destroyed in the Wilmington massacre of 1898. It was established in 1927. Fundraising efforts in 2021 helped save the newspaper's building at 412 South 7th Street.

Mary Alice Thatch served as editor and covered the Wilmington 10.
