= North Carolina Industrial Association =

The North Carolina Industrial Association (NCIA) was an American civic organization devoted to promoting the economic advancement of black people in North Carolina in the late 1800s and early 1900s.

== Creation ==
In early 1879, Raleigh black civic leaders Charles Norfleet Hunter and Osborne Hunter Jr.—brothers—and several associates met in the barbershop of Alexis Long to discuss the social condition of blacks in North Carolina. They concluded that total commitment to political efforts would not lead to success and prosperity for the black community and would generate "disastrous disappointment". They decided that instead it would be best for the black community to focus their energies on work and moral and intellectual advancement.

Both Charles and Osborne subsequently claimed to have come up with the idea for the North Carolina Industrial Association (NCIA). Charles drafted the incorporating legislation, which was passed by the North Carolina General Assembly on March 14, 1879. The incorporating act stated that it was "to encourage and promote the development of the industrial and educational resources of the colored people of North Carolina." It had 22 charter members and a capital stock of $20,000.

The NCIA's membership grew over subsequent years. By the 1890s, it represented black people of the state from all social classes and included both men and women. The organization's officers were solely men. NCIA members tended to be involved in other fraternal, civic, religious, or political organizations.

== Newspapers ==
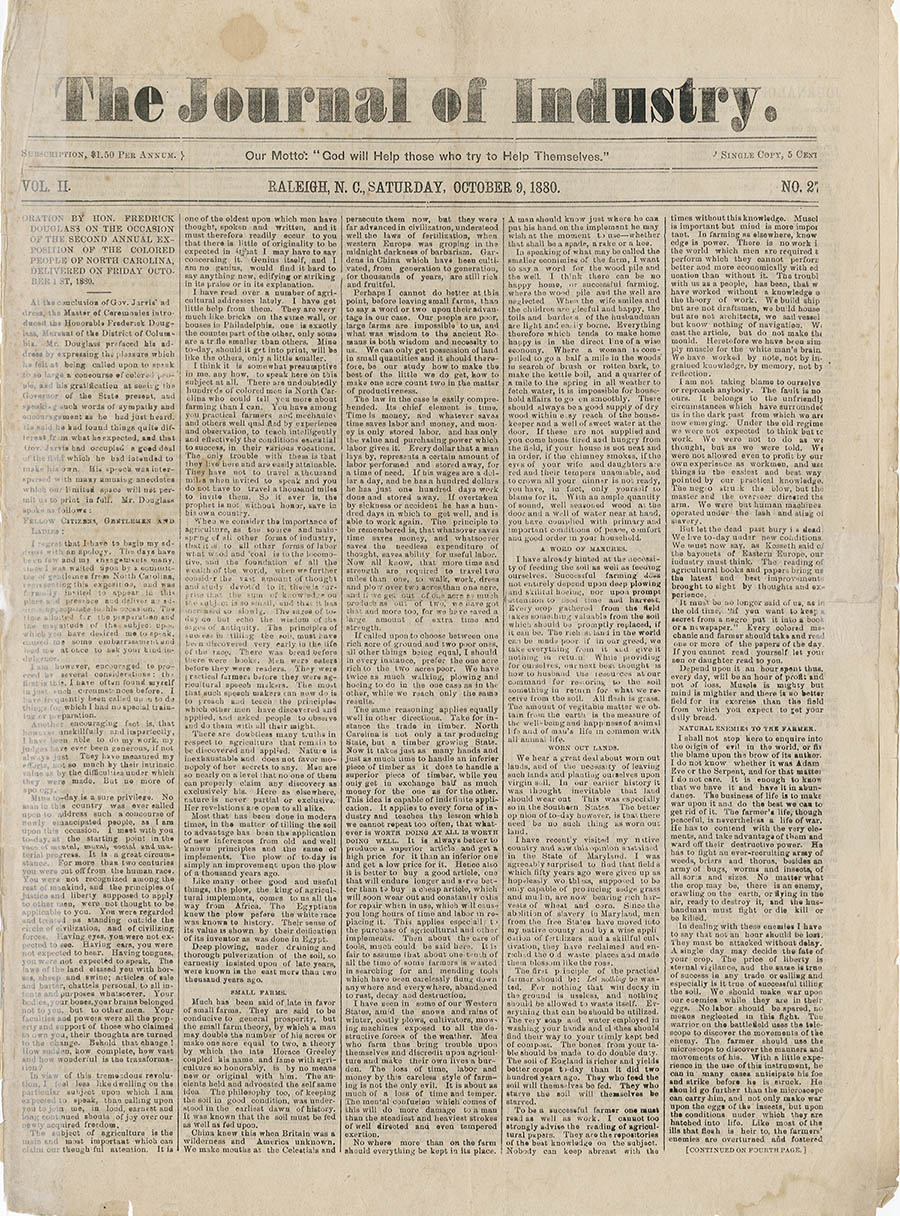
The 9 October 1880 issue of the Journal of Industry edited by Charles Hunter and his brother Osborne Hunter, Jr..

On April 1, 1879, the Journal of Industry entered print in Raleigh as the official newspaper of the NCIA, edited by Charles and Osborne Hunter. The Hunters sought to secure the support of prominent whites in their efforts for the NCIA. North Carolina Commissioner of Agriculture Leonidas L. Polk advised that the Journal should eschew politics and closely commit towards advancing black moral and economic improvement. The inaugural edition of the paper directly appealed to North Carolina's white ruling class, reprinting an 1865 letter from former State Superintendent of Common Schools Calvin H. Wiley encouraging white people to set aside grievances of the American Civil War and work to uplift the black population. It also included an editorial which implored white people to return the favor paid by the loyalty of former slaves by supporting the NCIA. For these kinds of appeals, the Hunters were accused by some other blacks of selling out to white Democrats. Historian Deborah Beckel characterized this stance as posturing, writing, "Underlying this benign appearance [they] sought to reorder political and economic condititions to benefit their race." The paper initially existed as a monthly periodical before transforming into a weekly publication by October 1880.

By April 1883, the Journal of Industry had been succeeded by The Banner–Enterprise as the NCIA's official media publication. The Banner–Enterprise of Wilmington was the result of a merger between The Banner of Raleigh and The Carolina Enterprise of Goldsboro, led by Ezekiel Ezra Smith, George Allen Mebane, and John H. Williamson. By 1884 or 1885, the official newspaper of the NCIA was the North Carolina Gazette, edited and published by Williamson. Under this title, publication appears to have ended by 1887 or 1888. As early as 1888, a publication known variously as the Gazette, the Weekly Gazette, and the Raleigh Gazette, edited by Williamson, was published as the NCIA's official newspaper. Charles Hunter served on its staff from 1891 to 1893. James H. Young purchased the paper in 1893 and it remained in circulation until 1898.

== State fairs ==
The main activity of the association—and its most well-known—was its organizing of an annual state fair, known variously as the "Negro State Fair," the "Colored State Fair," or the "State Fair of the Colored People of North Carolina." The NCIA secured the permission of the U.S. federal government to hold the first fair in 1879 at Camp Russell, east of Raleigh. The fair continued to be hosted there until the land was acquired to establish the North Carolina Confederate Soldiers' Home in 1890. Thereafter, the fair was held at the North Carolina State Fairgrounds, usually in October in the week following the official state fair.

The fairs opened with processions from Fayetteville Street in Raleigh to the grounds and usually closed with a ball. Social events, including fundraisers, were often held as companion events to the fair. Over time, it became tradition for North Carolina's governor to deliver an opening address at the beginning of each fair. Governor Thomas J. Jarvis spoke at the opening of the inaugural event in 1879. The fair organizers devoted significant energy towards the selection of guest speakers, especially those of national prominence; they hosted Frederick Douglass in 1880, Booker T. Washington in 1903, Maggie L. Walker in 1915, and various state officials and U.S. Congressmen over the years. The fair quickly became the most popular statewide event for North Carolina's black population, and other statewide black organizations scheduled their annual meetings to coincide with it. White people sometimes visited the fair and hosted exhibitions within it. White popular reception of the fair was generally positive and helped to enhance the status of the NCIA. In 1887, the fair began receiving financial support from the state government.

Conflicts with the state's white leadership over the use of the state fairgrounds led to the association's failure to host fairs in 1926, 1927, and 1929, and subsequent loss of state funding. The last fair organized by the NCIA was held in October 1930. The planning of a fair in 1931 was cut short by the death of Charles Hunter and additionally hampered by the lack of state funds. Black people's access to the North Carolina Sate Fair remained restricted for years thereafter, with a black section of the state fair allocated in 1948 before the event was desegregated in 1965.

== Works cited ==
- Beckel, Deborah (2011). Radical Reform: Interracial Politics in Post-Emancipation North Carolina. Charlottesville: University of Virginia Press. ISBN 978-0-8139-3002-2.
- Haley, John H. (2014). Charles N. Hunter and Race Relations in North Carolina. Chapel Hill: The University of North Carolina Press. ISBN 9781469617060.
- Logan, Frenise A. (January 1957). "The Colored Industrial Association of North Carolina and its Fair of 1886". The North Carolina Historical Review. 34 (1): 58–67. JSTOR 23517244.
