= Raleigh, North Carolina =

Capital city of North Carolina, U.S.

Raleigh
- State capital city
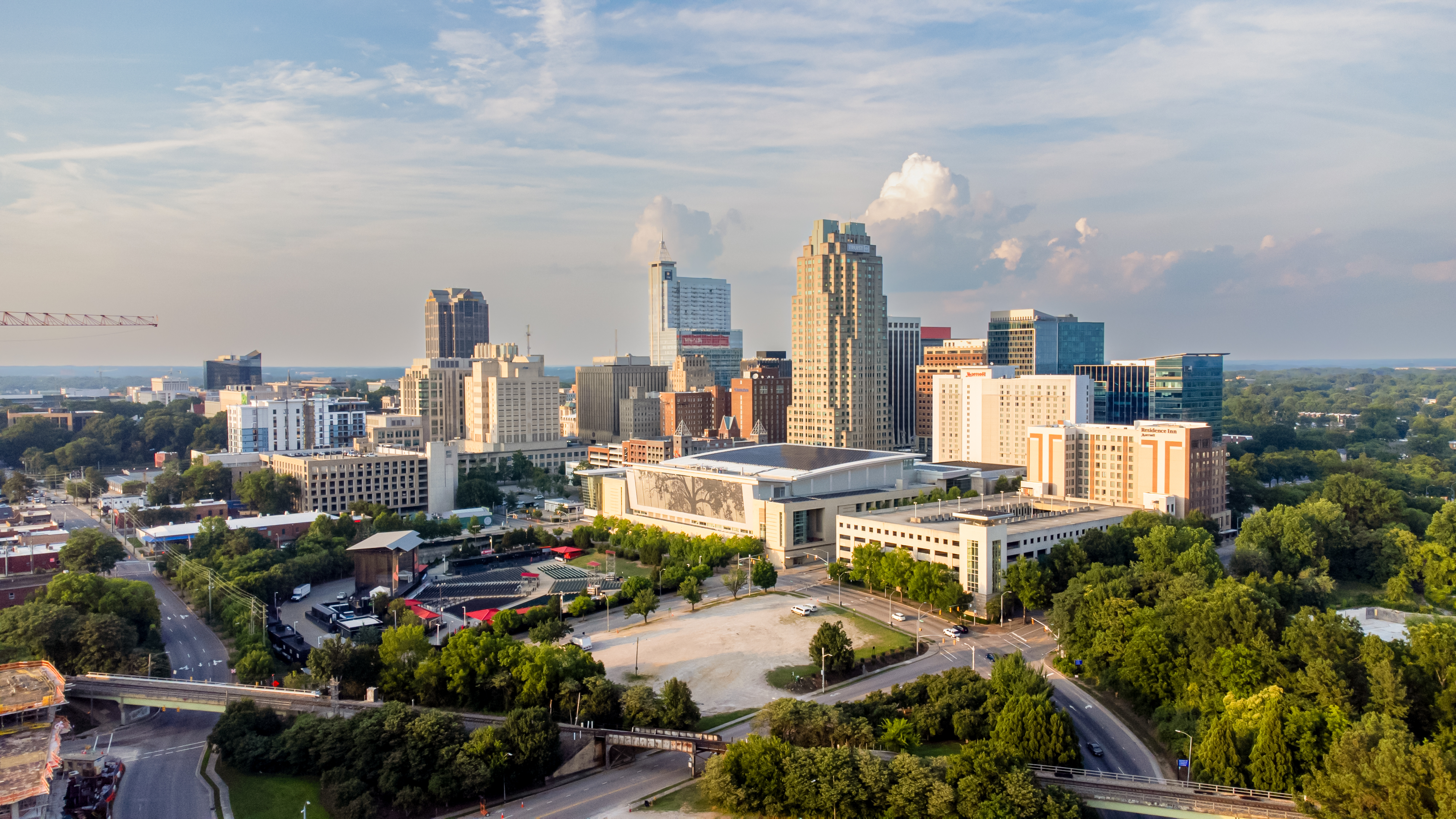
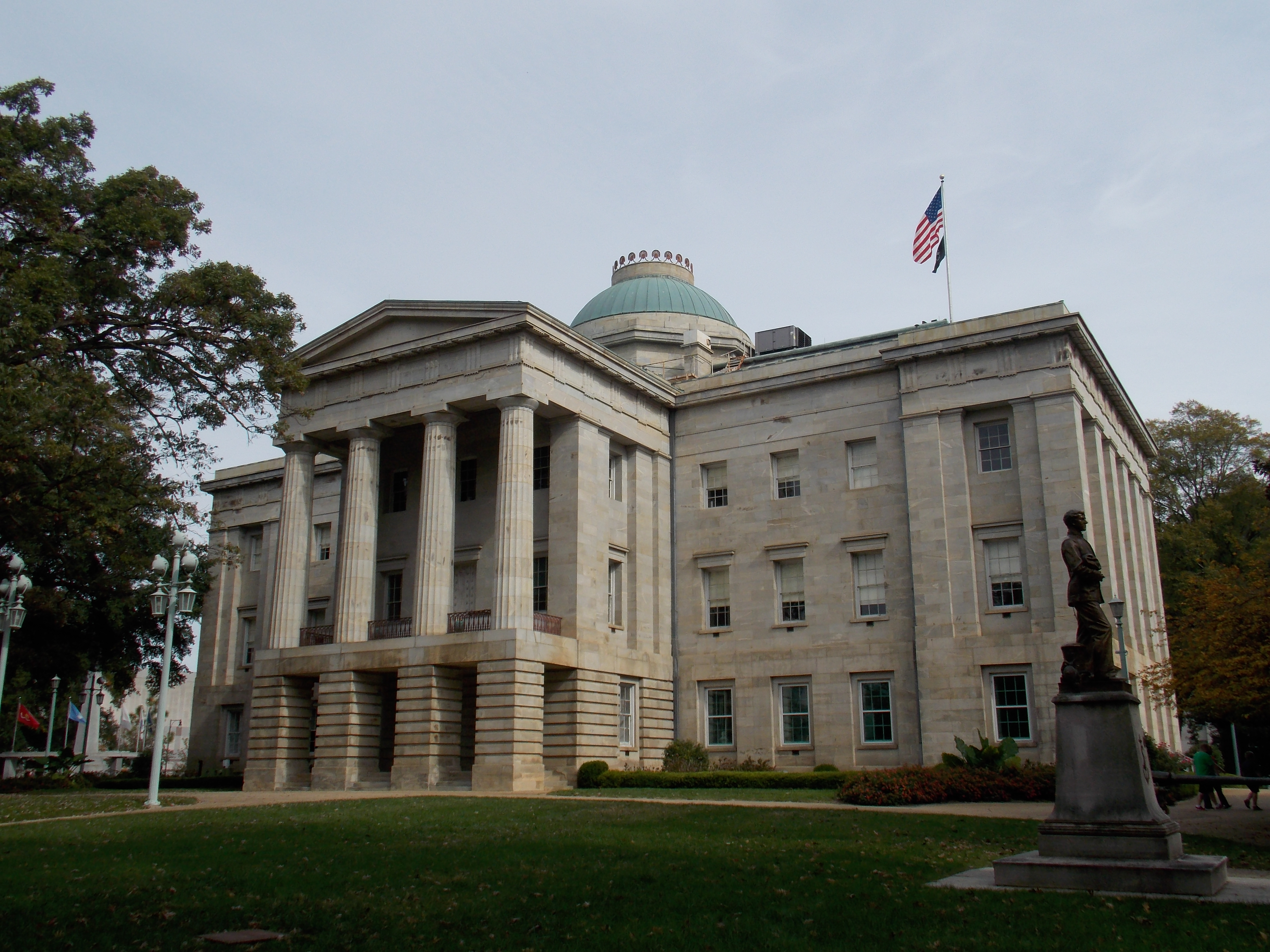
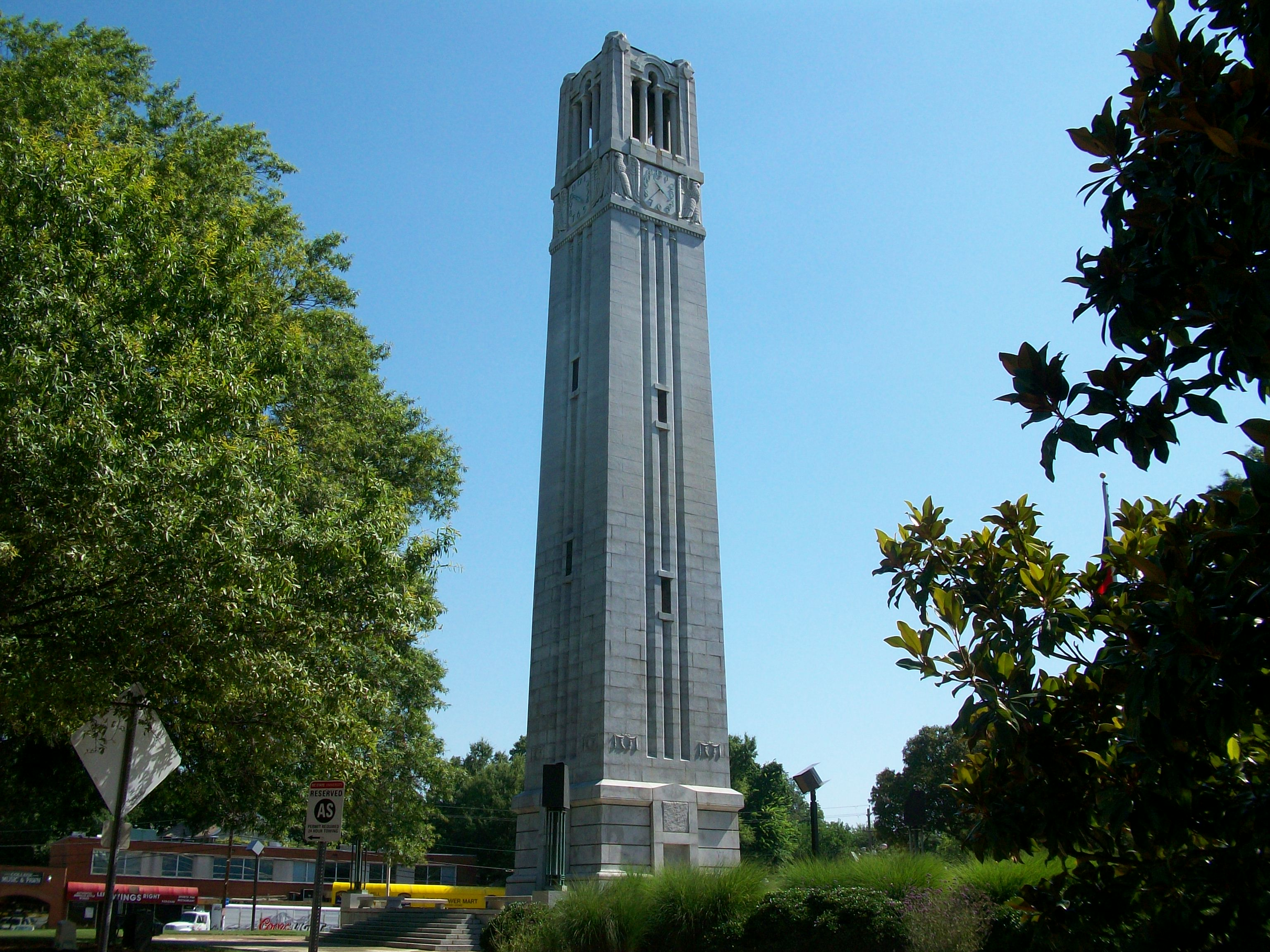
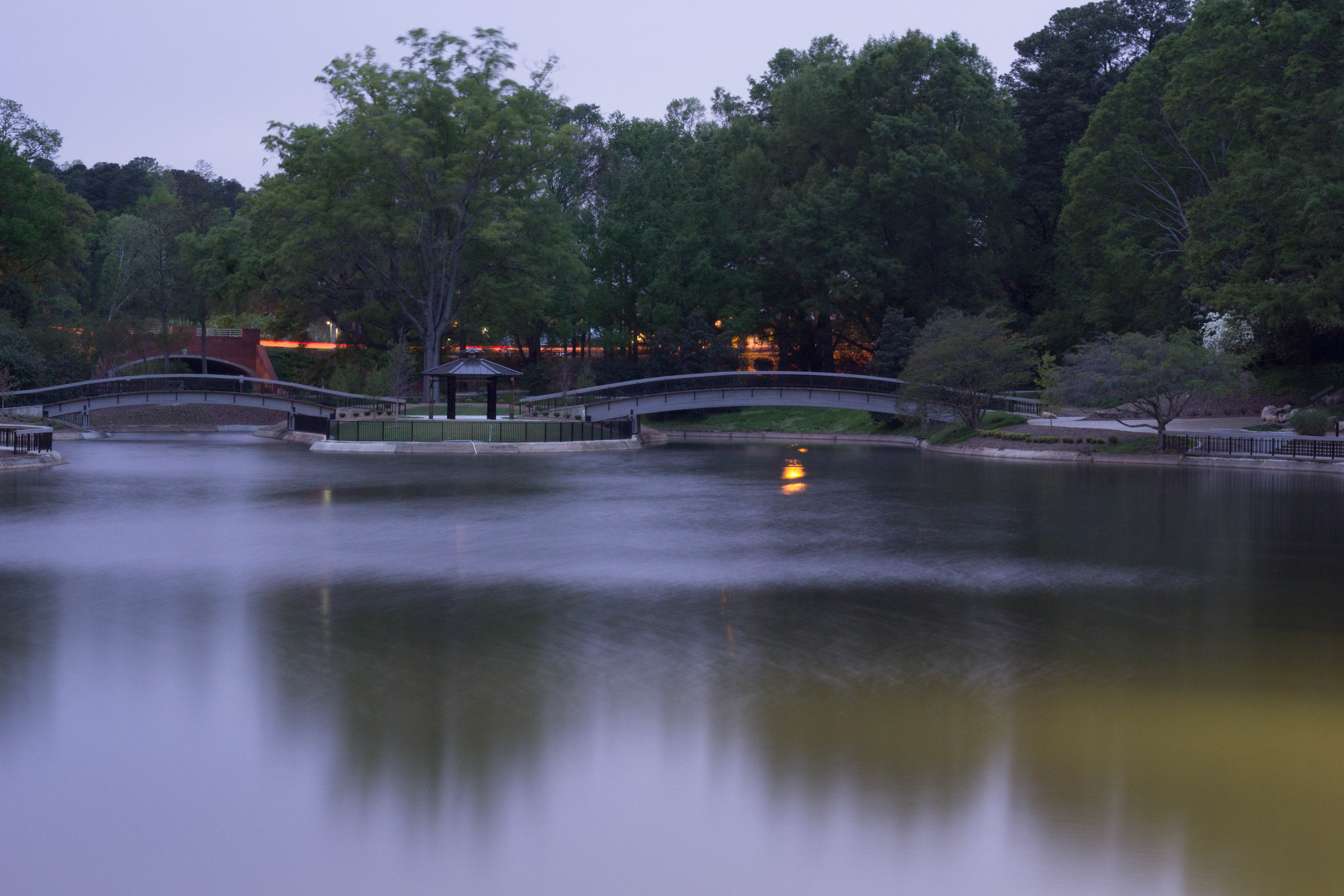
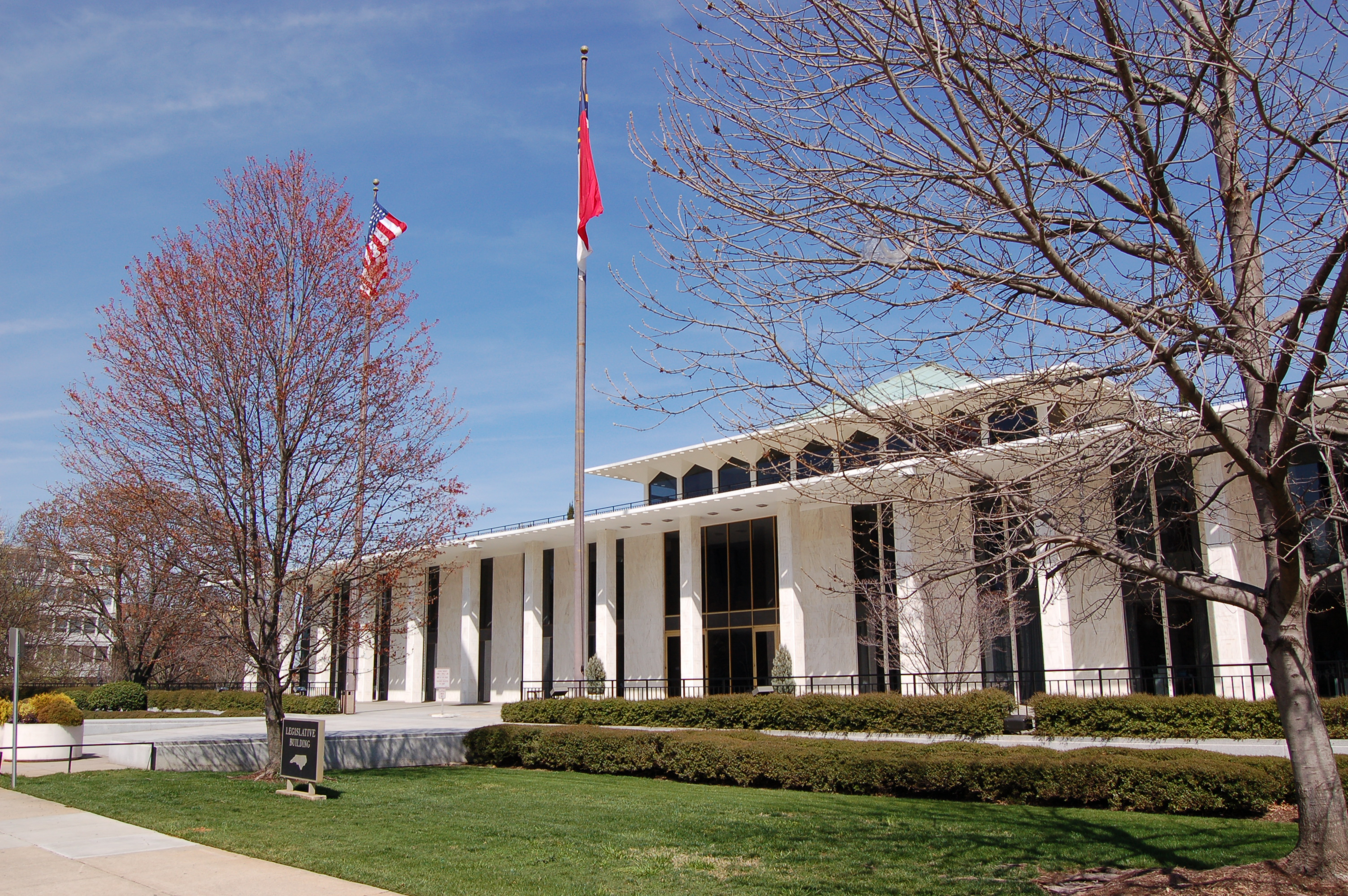
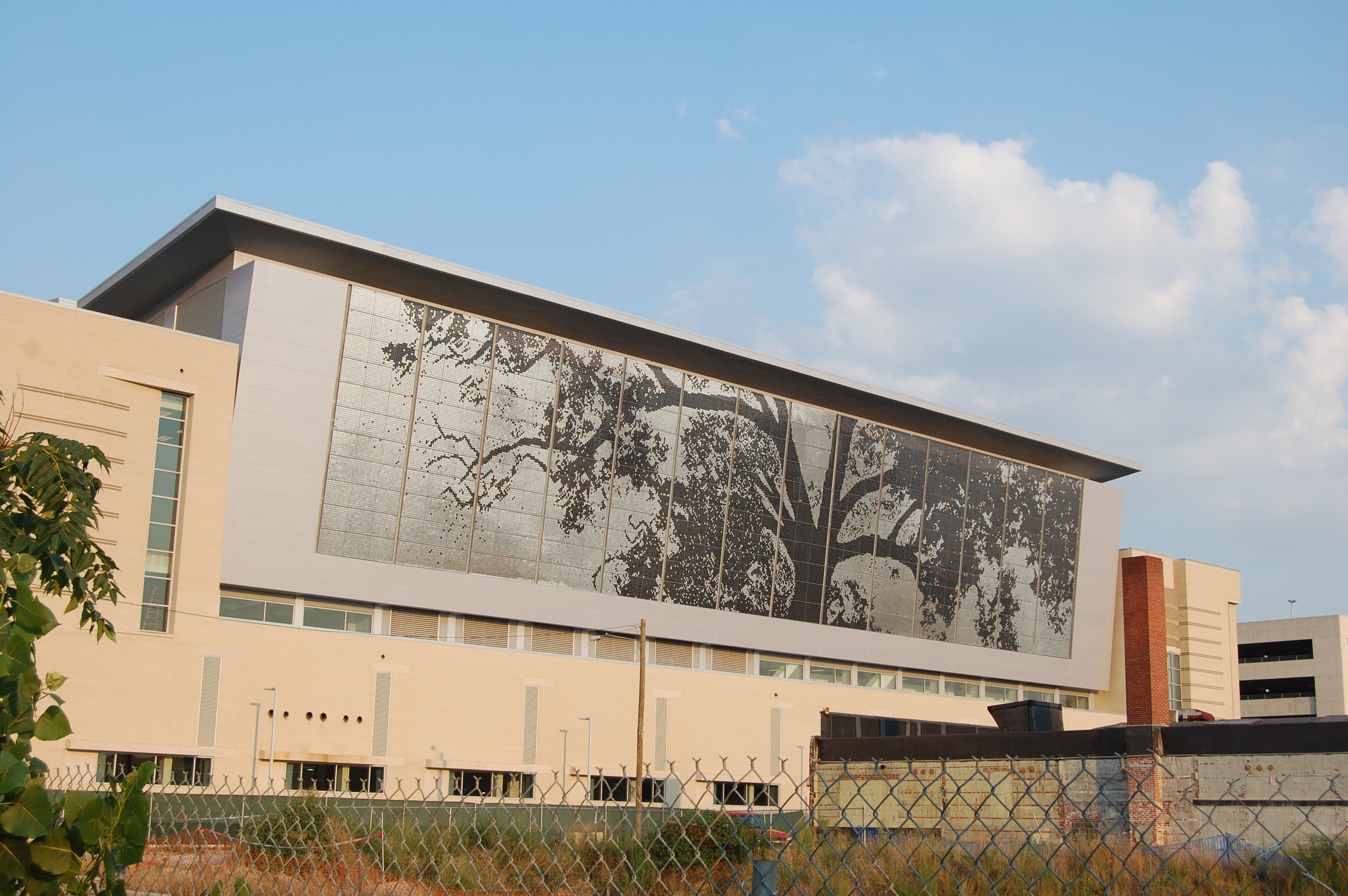
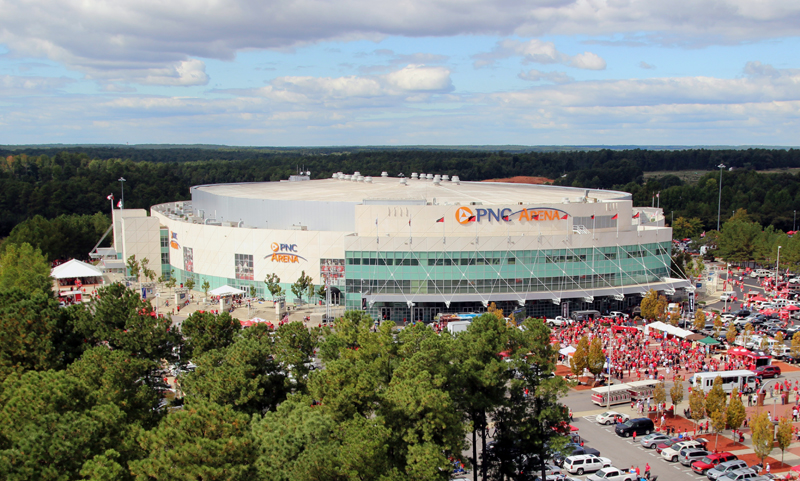
- Downtown Raleigh skyline North Carolina State Capitol North Carolina State University Pullen Park Legislative Building Raleigh Convention Center Lenovo Center

- Flag Seal Logo
- Nicknames: City of Oaks, Raleigh Wood, Oak City, Capital City
- Motto: Amore et Virtute (Latin for "by Love and Virtue")
- Interactive map of Raleigh
- Location within North Carolina Location within the United States Location within North America
- Coordinates: 35°51′15″N 78°45′43″W
- Country: United States
- State: North Carolina
- Counties: Wake, Durham
- Chartered: December 31, 1792
- Named for: Sir Walter Raleigh

Government
  - Type: Council–manager
  - Body: Raleigh City Council
  - Mayor: Janet Cowell (D)

Area
  - Total: 149.61 sq mi (387.50 km^{2})
  - Land: 148.55 sq mi (384.73 km^{2})
  - Water: 1.07 sq mi (2.77 km^{2}) 0.72%
- Elevation: 331 ft (101 m)

Population (2020)
  - Total: 467,665
  - Estimate (2026): 516,807 ▲
  - Rank: 39th in the United States; 2nd in North Carolina
  - Density: 3,148.3/sq mi (1,215.57/km^{2})
  - Urban: 1,106,646 (US: 43rd)
  - Urban density: 1,995/sq mi (770.1/km^{2})
  - Metro: 1,509,231 (US: 41st)
- Demonym: Raleighite
- Time zone: UTC−5 (EST)
  - Summer (DST): UTC−4 (EDT)
- ZIP Codes: 276XX: 27601-27617, 27619-27620, 27622-27629, 27634-27640, 27650, 27656, 27658, 27661, 27668, 27675-27676, 27690, 27695, 27697-27699
- Area code(s): 919, 984
- FIPS code: 37-55000
- GNIS feature ID: 2404590
- Primary Airport: Raleigh–Durham International Airport
- Website: raleighnc.gov

Raleigh (/ˈrɑːli/ RAH-lee) is the capital city of the U.S. state of North Carolina. It is the second-most populous city in the state (after Charlotte), tenth most populous city in the Southeast, the largest city in the Research Triangle area, and the 39th-most populous city in the U.S. Known as the "City of Oaks" for its oak-lined streets, Raleigh covers 148.54 square miles (384.7 km^{2}) and had a population of 516,807 as of the 2026 estimate. It is the county seat of Wake County and is named after Sir Walter Raleigh, who founded the lost Roanoke Colony.

Raleigh is home to North Carolina State University and is part of the Research Triangle, which includes Durham (home to Duke University and North Carolina Central University) and Chapel Hill (home to the University of North Carolina at Chapel Hill). The Research Triangle area, centered around Research Triangle Park, has a population of over 2.37 million people. The Raleigh–Cary metropolitan statistical area alone has an estimated population of 1.51 million. Raleigh lies primarily in Wake County, with a small portion of the city extending into Durham County. Nearby suburbs include Apex, Cary, Clayton, Fuquay-Varina, Garner, Holly Springs, Knightdale, Morrisville, Rolesville, Wake Forest, Wendell, and Zebulon.

Raleigh is an early example in the United States of a planned city. Following the American Revolutionary War when the U.S. gained independence, the area was chosen as the site of the state capital in 1788 and incorporated in 1792 as such. The city was originally laid out in a grid pattern with the North Carolina State Capitol at the center, in Union Square. During the American Civil War, the city was spared from any significant battle. It fell to the Union in the closing days of the war and struggled with the economic hardships in the postwar period, related to the reconstitution of labor markets, over-reliance on agriculture, and the social unrest of the Reconstruction Era. The establishment of the Research Triangle Park in 1959 helped create thousands of jobs in the fields of science and technology.

== History ==
=== Earlier capitals ===
Bath, the oldest town in North Carolina, was the first nominal capital of the colony from 1705 until 1722, when Edenton took over the role. The colony had no permanent institutions of government until the new capital, New Bern, was established in 1743.

=== 18th century ===
In December 1770, Joel Lane successfully petitioned the North Carolina General Assembly to create a new county. On January 5, 1771, the bill creating Wake County was passed in the General Assembly. The county was formed from portions of Cumberland, Orange, and Johnston counties, and was named for Margaret Wake Tryon, the wife of Governor William Tryon. The first county seat was Bloomsbury.

New Bern, a port town on the Neuse River 35 mi (56 km) from the Atlantic Ocean, was the largest city and the capital of North Carolina during the American Revolution. When the British Army laid siege to the city, that site could no longer be used as the capital. From 1789 to 1794, when Raleigh was being built, the state capital was Fayetteville.

Raleigh was chosen as the site of the new capital in 1788, as its central location protected it from attacks from the coast. It was officially established in 1792 as both county seat and state capital. The city was incorporated on December 31, 1792, and a charter granted January 21, 1795. The city was named for Sir Walter Raleigh, sponsor of Roanoke, the "lost colony" on Roanoke Island.

No known city or town existed previously on the chosen city site. Raleigh is one of the few cities in the United States that was planned and built specifically to serve as a state capital. Its original boundaries were formed by the downtown streets of North, East, West and South. The plan, a grid with two main axes meeting at a central square and an additional square in each corner, was based on Thomas Holme's 1682 plan for Philadelphia. The city was developed on the land of various plantations including Crabtree, Mordecai, Oak View, Pine Hall, Pullen, Spring Hill, and Wakefield.

The North Carolina General Assembly first met in Raleigh in December 1794, and granted the city a charter, with a board of seven appointed commissioners and an "Intendant of Police" (which developed as the office of Mayor) to govern it. After 1803, city commissioners were elected. In 1799, the N.C. Minerva and Raleigh Advertiser was the first newspaper published in Raleigh. John Haywood was the first Intendant of Police.

=== 19th century ===
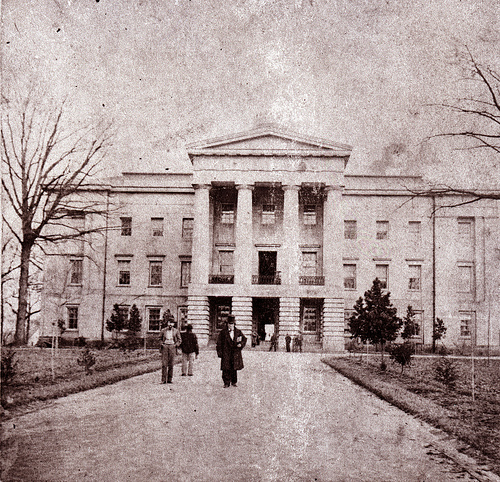
North Carolina State Capitol, c. 1861; Governor David Settle Reid is in the foreground

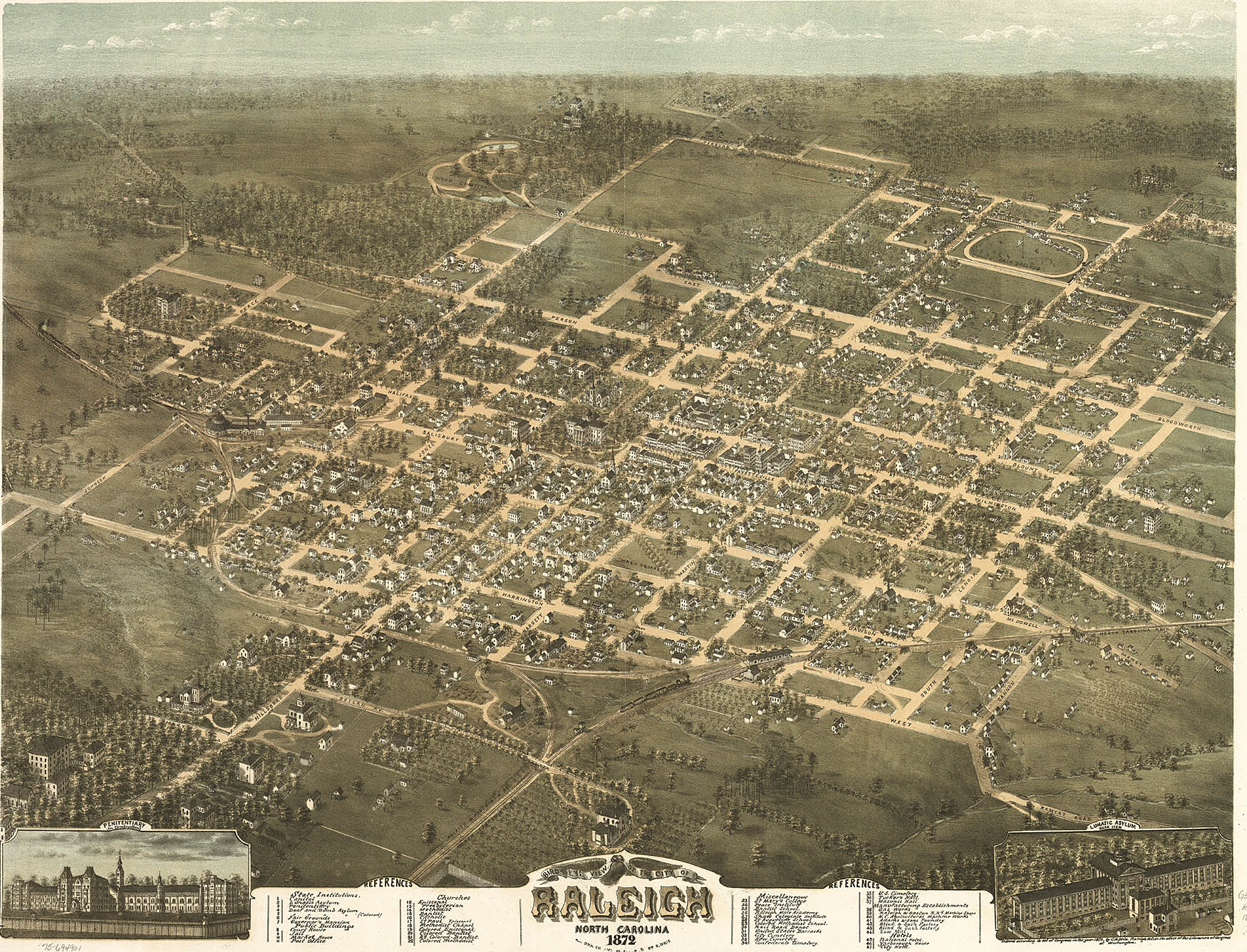
Raleigh in 1872

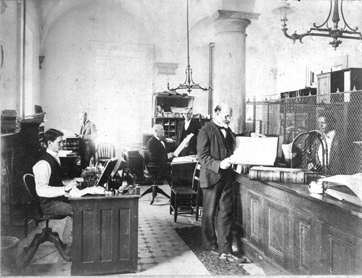
North Carolina State Treasurers Office in State Capitol, c. 1890s

In 1808, Andrew Johnson, the United States' future 17th President, was born at Casso's Inn in Raleigh. The city's first water supply network was completed in 1818, although due to system failures, the project was abandoned. In 1817, the Episcopal Diocese of North Carolina was established and headquartered in Raleigh. In 1819, Raleigh's first volunteer fire company was founded, followed in 1821 by a full-time fire company.

In 1831, a fire destroyed the North Carolina State House. Two years later, reconstruction began with quarried gneiss being delivered by the first railroad in the state. Raleigh celebrated the completion of the new State Capitol and new Raleigh & Gaston Railroad Company in 1840. The first State Fair was held near Raleigh in 1853. The first institution of higher learning in Raleigh, Peace College, was established in 1857. Raleigh's Historic Oakwood contains many houses from the 19th century that are still in good condition.

North Carolina seceded from the Union during the American Civil War on May 20, 1861. After the war began, Governor Zebulon Baird Vance ordered the construction of breastworks around the city as protection from Union troops. The North Carolina State School for the Blind and Deaf, currently known as the Governor Morehead School, served as Raleigh's arsenal. Near the end of the Civil War, Governor Vance arranged his evacuation to avoid capture as Union General William Sherman's forces approached the city. Before leaving, Vance met with former governors Graham and Swain to draft a letter of surrender for Raleigh. Their intention was to protect Raleigh from the destruction inflicted on other cities by Union troops. Graham and Swain departed to meet the advancing Federal forces on the morning of April 12, 1865, and were to return by that evening. The evening struck, but Graham and Swain had not returned due to train delays and their temporary capture by Sherman. Governor Vance left the evening after Graham and Sherman failed to return, leaving behind a letter giving Mayor William H. Harrison the authority to surrender.

On the morning of April 13, Mayor Harrison among others went to the southern Wake County area to meet General Hugh Judson Kilpatrick and propose surrender. Kenneth Rayner, a long-time resident of Raleigh, delivered the proposal including a promise of no resistance. Kilpatrick agreed to accept the surrender and protect Raleigh from destruction. Kilpatrick's cavalry occupied Raleigh and removed the flagpole from the state capitol, replacing it with a United States Flag above the dome. Sherman arrived shortly after and established his headquarters in the governor's mansion. The city was spared significant destruction during the war. As Confederate cavalry retreated west, Union soldiers followed, leading to the Battle of Morrisville nearby.

Due to the economic and social problems of the postwar period and Reconstruction, with a state economy still heavily dependent on agriculture, the city grew little over the next several decades.

Shaw University, the South's first African American college, began classes in 1865 and was chartered in 1875. Its Estey Hall was the first building constructed for the higher education of Black women, and Leonard Medical Center was the first four-year medical school in the country for African Americans.

In 1867, Episcopal clergy founded St. Augustine's College for the education of freedmen. The biracial Reconstruction legislature created new welfare institutions: in 1869, it approved the United States' first school for blind and deaf Black people, to be located in Raleigh. In 1874, the federal government constructed the Federal Building in Raleigh, the first federal government project in the Southern U.S. following the Civil War.

In 1880, the newspapers News and Observer combined to form The News & Observer. It continues to be Raleigh's primary daily newspaper. The North Carolina College of Agriculture and Mechanic Arts, now known as North Carolina State University, was founded as a land-grant college in 1887. The city's Rex Hospital opened in 1889 and included the state's first nursing school. The Baptist Women's College, now known as Meredith College, opened in 1891, and in 1898, The Academy of Music, a private music conservatory, was established.

In the late nineteenth century, two Black Congressmen were elected from North Carolina's 2nd district, the last in 1898. George Henry White sought to promote civil rights for Black citizens and to challenge efforts by White Democrats to reduce Black voting by new discriminatory laws. He and his allies were unsuccessful. Based on a White supremacy campaign that returned Democrats to dominance, in 1900 the state legislature passed a new constitution, with a suffrage amendment that raised barriers to voter registration, resulting in the disenfranchisement of most Black citizens and many poor White citizens. Loss of the ability to vote also disqualified Black men (and later women) from sitting on juries and serving in any office—local, state or federal. The rising Black middle-class in Raleigh and other areas was politically silenced and shut out of local governance, and the Republican Party was no longer competitive in the state.

It was not until after federal civil rights legislation was passed in the mid-1960s that the majority of Black citizens in North Carolina would again be able to vote, sit on juries and serve in local offices. By that time, many African Americans had left the state in the Great Migration to northern industrial cities for more opportunities. No African American was elected to Congress from North Carolina until 1992.

=== 20th century ===
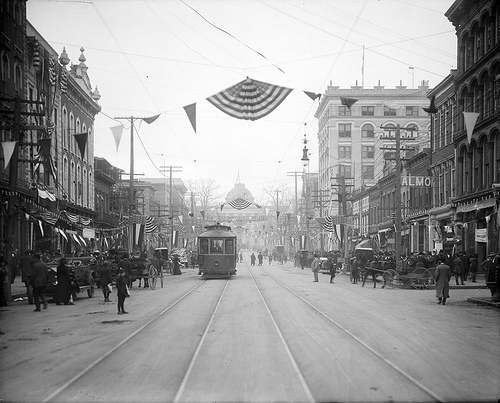
Fayetteville Street during the 1910s

In 1912, Bloomsbury Park opened, featuring a popular carousel ride. Relocated to Pullen Park, the Pullen Park Carousel is still operating. From 1914 to 1917, an influenza epidemic killed 288 Raleighites.

In 1922, WLAC signed on as the city's first radio station, but lasted only two years. WFBQ signed on in 1924 and became WPTF in 1927. It is now Raleigh's oldest continuous radio broadcaster. In 1923, the Raleigh Fall Festival was formed, which was reorganized as the North Carolina Debutante Ball in 1927. Following immigration by Catholics, on December 12, 1924, the Roman Catholic Diocese of Raleigh was officially established by Pope Pius XI. The Sacred Heart Cathedral became the official seat of the diocese with William Joseph Hafey as its bishop. The city's first airport, Curtiss-Wright Flying Field, opened in 1929. That same year, the stock market crash resulted in six Raleigh banks closing.

During the difficult 1930s of the Great Depression, government at all levels was integral to creating jobs. The city provided recreational and educational programs, and hired people for public works projects. In 1932, Raleigh Memorial Auditorium was dedicated. The North Carolina Symphony, founded the same year, performed in its new home. From 1934 to 1937, the federal Civilian Conservation Corps constructed the area now known as William B. Umstead State Park. In 1939, the State General Assembly chartered the Raleigh-Durham Aeronautical Authority to build a larger airport between Raleigh and Durham, with the first flight occurring in 1943.

In 1947, Raleigh citizens adopted a council–manager form of government, which is still the city's current form of government. The Dorton Arena, a 7,610-seat multi-purpose arena designed by Matthew Nowicki, was opened in 1952 on the grounds of the North Carolina State Fair. It was listed in the National Register of Historic Places in 1973.

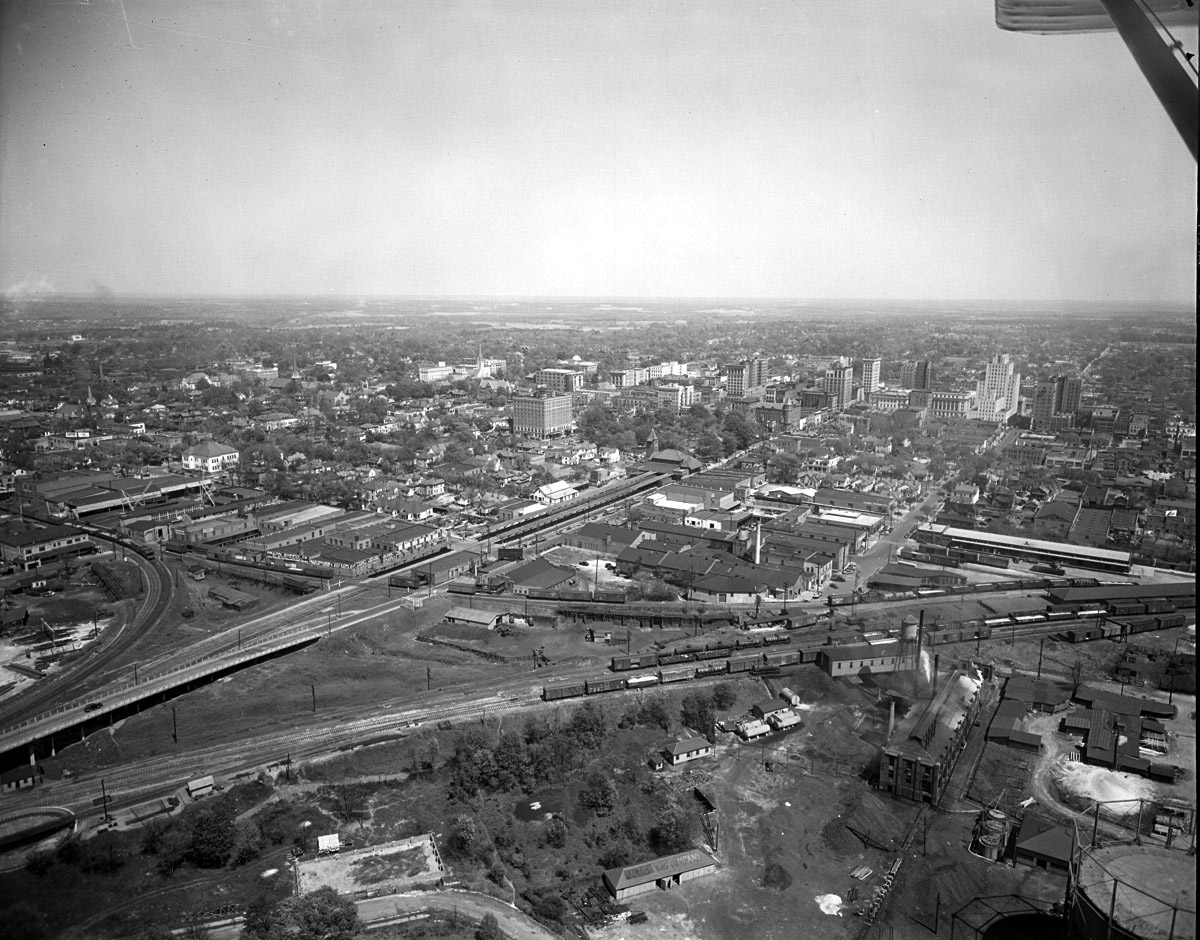
Downtown Raleigh c. 1949

In 1953, WNAO-TV, channel 28, became the city's first television station, though it folded in 1957. Raleigh experienced significant damage from Hurricane Hazel in 1954.

With the opening of the Research Triangle Park in 1959, Raleigh began to experience a population increase, resulting in a total city population of 100,000 by 1960. In 1960, the Census Bureau reported Raleigh's population as 76.4% White and 23.4% Black.

Following the passage of the federal Voting Rights Act of 1965, one of the main achievements of the Civil Rights Movement and the Lyndon B. Johnson presidency, political participation and voting by African Americans in Raleigh increased rapidly. From the early to mid-20th century, East Hargett Street was known as Raleigh's "Black Main Street" and hosted numerous Black-owned businesses. The area declined after the city desegregated its establishments. Another of Raleigh's oldest Black neighborhoods, Fourth Ward, was demolished starting in 1971, with about 600 homes and 60 businesses south of downtown gone as a result of urban renewal, and 1,600 people forced to move. It was claimed that housing was substandard and the area had a lot of crime.

By the early 1970s, people in Raleigh were growing increasingly concerned about growth and urban sprawl. Community organizations felt that municipal offices were being too heavily influenced by business interests when the city's population was rapidly growing and various development projects were being proposed. At their behest, the municipal elections were altered so that the mayor was to be directly elected, instead of being selected by the city council. Most city council seats were then made responsible to districts, instead of being held at-large. The 1973 elections were the first contests affected by the reforms. City councilman Clarence Lightner defeated Raleigh Merchants Bureau executive director G. Wesley Williams to become Raleigh's first Black mayor, and thus the first Black mayor in a major White-majority city in the South.

In 1976, the Raleigh City and Wake County schools merged to become the Wake County Public School System, now the largest school system in the state and 19th largest in the country. During the 1970s and 1980s, the I-440 beltline was constructed, in an attempt to ease traffic congestion and provide access to most major city roads.

The first Raleigh Convention Center (replaced in 2008) and Fayetteville Street Mall were both opened in 1977. Fayetteville Street was turned into a pedestrian-only street in an effort to help the then-ailing downtown area, but the plan was flawed and business declined for years to come. Fayetteville Street was reopened in 2007 as the main thoroughfare of Raleigh's downtown.

During the 1988 Raleigh tornado outbreak of November 28, 1988, the city was affected by the most destructive of the seven tornadoes reported in Northeastern North Carolina and southeastern Virginia between 1:00 am and 5:45 am. The Raleigh tornado produced over $77 million in damage, along with four fatalities (two in the city of Raleigh, and two in Nash County) and 154 injuries. The damage path from the storm was measured at 84 mi (135 km) long, and .5 mi (0.8 km) wide at times. The tornado was rated F4.

In 1991, two large skyscrapers in Raleigh were completed, First Union Capitol Center and Two Hannover Square, along with the popular Coastal Credit Union Music Park at Walnut Creek in southeast Raleigh. In 1996, the Olympic Flame passed through Raleigh while on its way to the 1996 Summer Olympics in Atlanta. Also in 1996, Hurricane Fran struck the area, causing massive flooding and extensive structural damage. In addition, WRAL-TV became the first High-Definition broadcast station in the world. In 1997, the Hartford Whalers of the National Hockey League announced their intention to move to Raleigh as the Carolina Hurricanes, becoming the city's first major league professional sports franchise.

In 1999, the Raleigh Entertainment and Sports Arena (later renamed the RBC Center and now called Lenovo Center), opened to provide a home for the Hurricanes and the NC State Wolfpack men's basketball team, as well as an up-to-date major concert venue.

=== 21st century ===
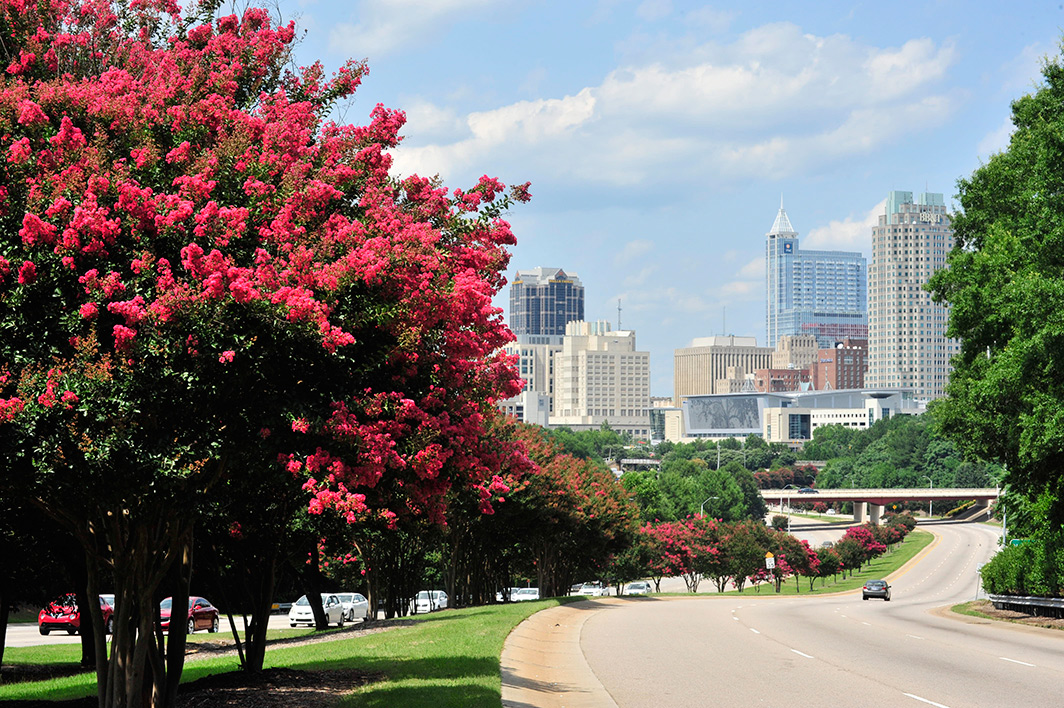
The Raleigh skyline with crepe myrtle trees in bloom, 2017

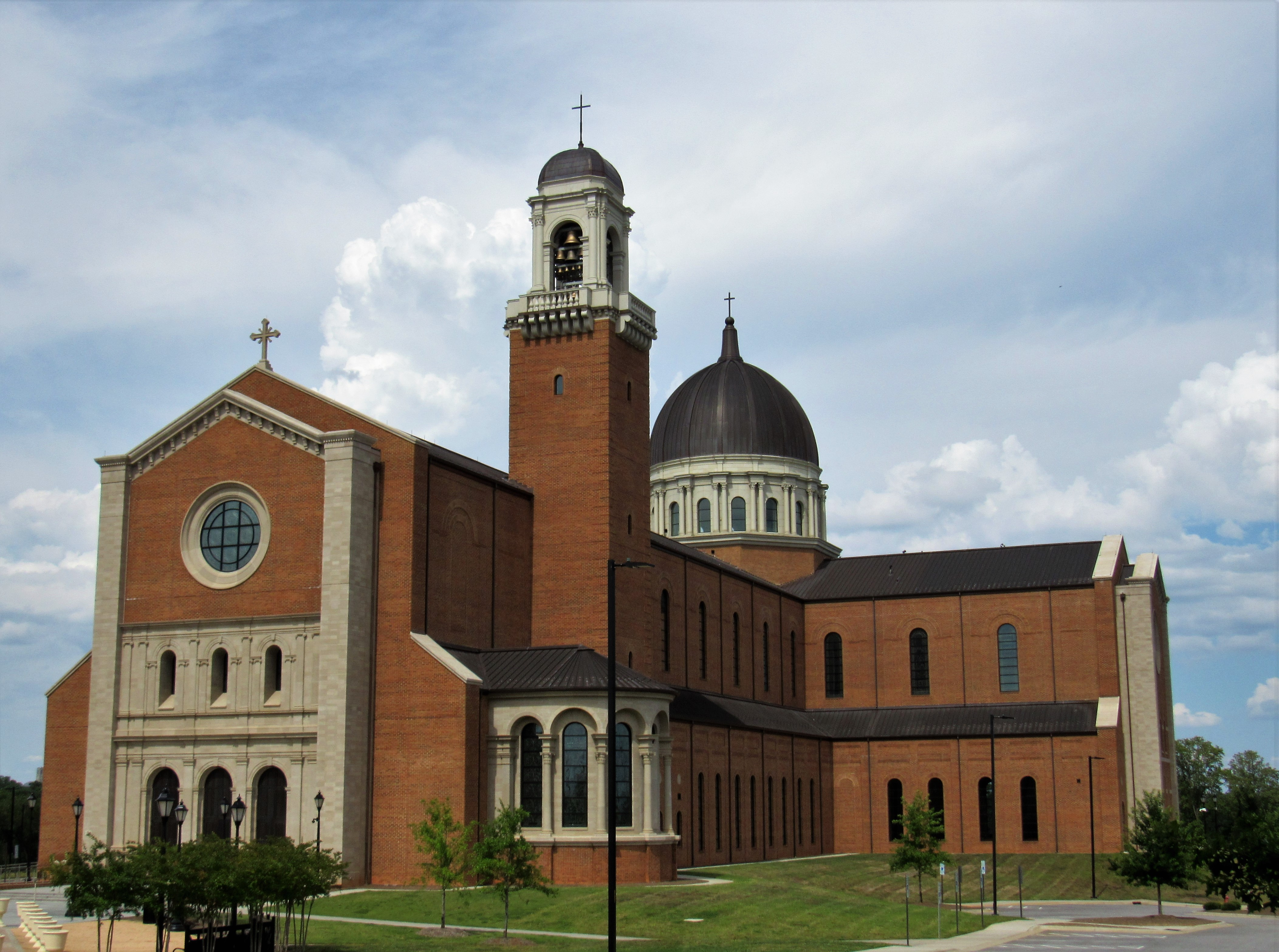
Holy Name of Jesus Cathedral in 2019

In 2001, the Raleigh Memorial Auditorium complex was expanded with the addition of the Progress Energy Center for the Performing Arts, Meymandi Concert Hall, Fletcher Opera Theater, Kennedy Theatre, Betty Ray McCain Gallery and Lichtin Plaza.

Fayetteville Street reopened to vehicular traffic in 2006. A variety of downtown building projects began around this time including the 34-story RBC Bank Tower, multiple condominium projects and several new restaurants. Additional skyscrapers are in the proposal/planning phase. The Carolina Hurricanes won the Stanley Cup the same year, which was North Carolina's first professional sports championship.

With the opening of parts of I-540 from 2005 to 2007, a new 70 mi (110 km) loop around Wake County, traffic congestion eased somewhat in the North Raleigh area. Completion of the entire loop is expected to take another 15 years. In 2008, the city's Fayetteville Street Historic District joined the National Register of Historic Places.

In September 2010, Raleigh hosted the inaugural Hopscotch Music Festival. Raleigh hosted the 2011 National Hockey League All-Star Game. In April 2011, a devastating EF-3 tornado hit Raleigh, and many other tornadoes touched down in the state (ultimately the largest, but not the strongest outbreak to ever hit the state), killing 24 people. The tornado tracked northeast through parts of downtown, East Central Raleigh and Northeast Raleigh and produced $115 million in damages in Wake County. There were 4 fatalities in the city.

In September 2015, Holy Trinity Anglican Church was opened; the first church to be built in downtown Raleigh since 1958. On July 26, 2017, the Catholic Diocese of Raleigh dedicated its new cathedral, Holy Name of Jesus Cathedral, the fifth-largest in the United States.

On October 13, 2022, a spree shooting occurred in Raleigh's Hedingham neighborhood. Five people were killed, and two others were injured. The suspect, a 15-year-old boy, was detained after being critically wounded and later remanded into the custody of the medical unit of a juvenile correctional facility.

== Geography ==
According to the United States Census Bureau, the city has a total area of 149.60 square miles (387.5 km^{2}), of which 148.54 sq mi (384.7 km^{2}) is land and 1.07 sq mi (2.8 km^{2}) (0.72%) is water. The Neuse River flows through the northeastern corner of the city.

Raleigh is located in the northeast central region of North Carolina, where the Piedmont and Atlantic coastal plain regions meet. This area is known as the "fall line" because it marks the elevation inland at which waterfalls begin to appear in creeks and rivers. As a result, most of Raleigh features gently rolling hills that slope eastward toward the state's flat coastal plain.

The city of Raleigh is located 24 mi (39 km) southeast of Durham; 63 mi (101 km) northeast of Fayetteville; 131 mi (211 km) northwest of Wilmington; 155 mi (249 km) southwest of Richmond, Virginia; and 165 mi (266 km) northeast of Charlotte. A small portion of Raleigh is located in Durham County, North Carolina.

=== Cityscape ===
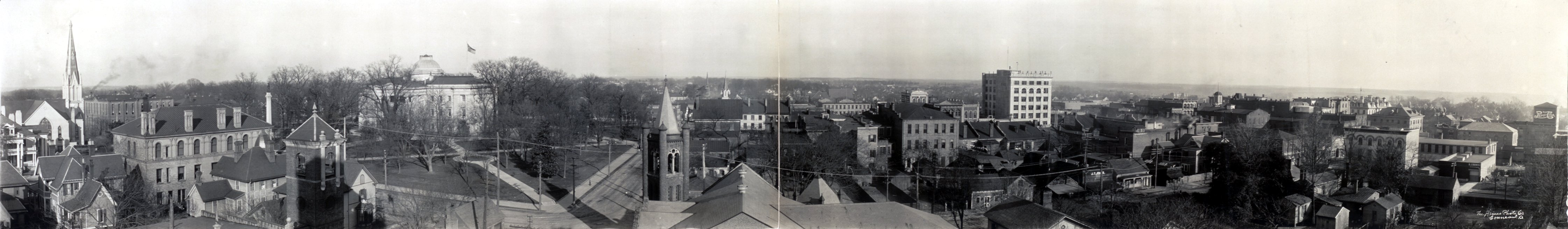
Downtown Raleigh panorama, from 1909
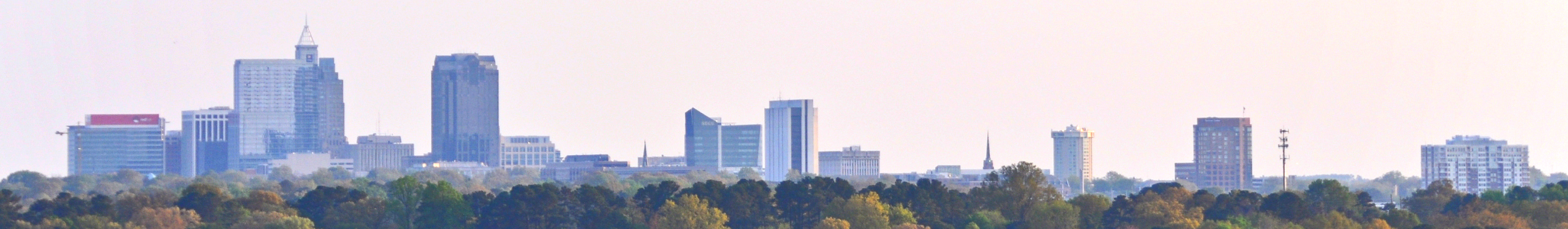
Downtown Raleigh panorama, in 2014

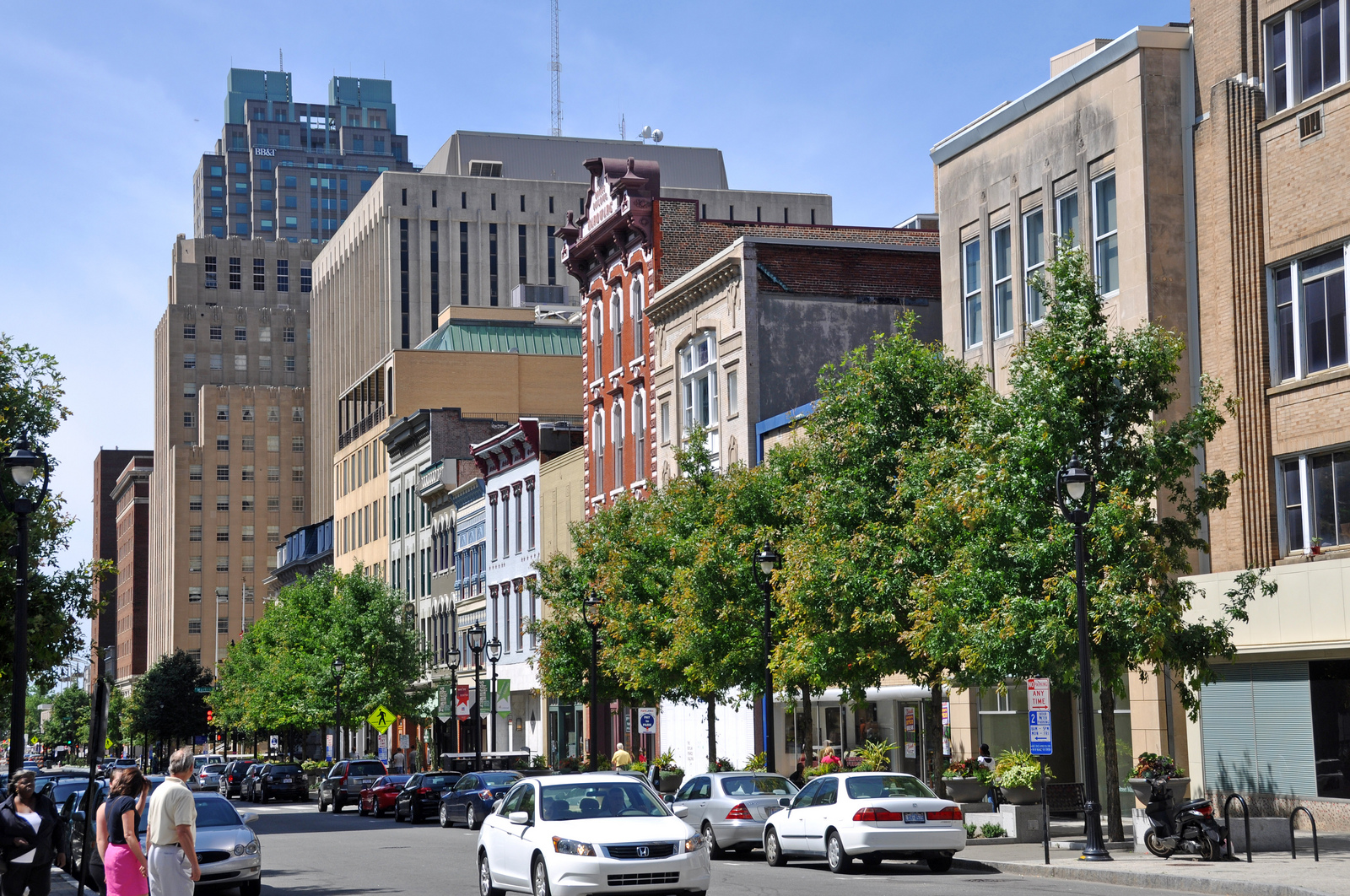
Fayetteville Street in downtown Raleigh

Raleigh is divided into several major geographic areas, each of which use a Raleigh address and a ZIP code that begins with the digits 276. PNC Plaza, formerly known as RBC Plaza, is the largest and tallest skyscraper in the city of Raleigh. The tower rises to a height of 538 ft (164 m), with a floor count of 34.

==== Inside the Beltline ====
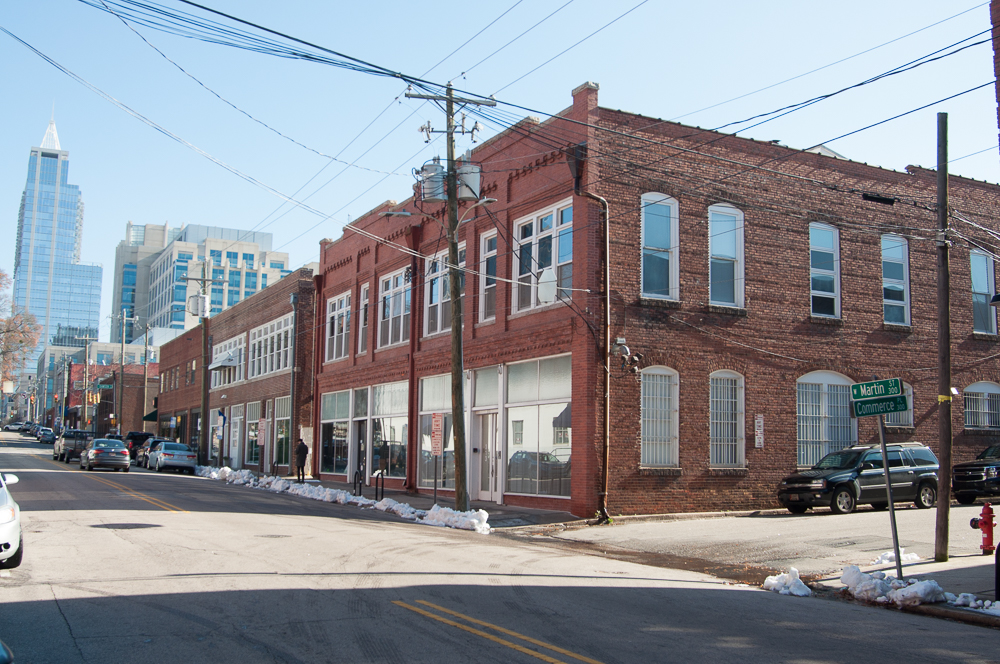
Warehouses on Martin Street

One common division of Raleigh is to differentiate the central part of the city, which lies inside of the circumferential highway known as the Raleigh Beltline (I-440 and I-40) from areas outside of the Beltline. The area inside of the beltline includes the entirety of the central business district known as Downtown Raleigh, as well as several more residential areas surrounding it.

The downtown area is home to historic buildings such as the Sir Walter Raleigh Hotel built in the early 20th century, the restored City Market, the Fayetteville Street downtown business district (which includes the PNC Plaza and Wells Fargo Capitol Center buildings), as well as the North Carolina Museum of History, North Carolina Museum of Natural Sciences, North Carolina State Capitol, William Peace University, the City of Raleigh Museum, Raleigh Convention Center, Shaw University, Campbell University School of Law, and St. Augustine's College. In the 2000s, an effort by the Downtown Raleigh Alliance was made to separate this area of the city into five smaller districts: Fayetteville Street, Moore Square, Glenwood South, Warehouse, and Capital District. The nearby Blount Street Historic District includes many of the city's historic Victorian, Georgian Revival, Queen Anne, and Second Empire mansions, including Norris-Heartt House, Andrews-Duncan House, Heck-Andrews House, Bailey-Tucker House, Capehart House, Bailey-Bunn House, and the Garland Scott and Toler Moore Tucker House (the latter was later moved from its original location to Oakwood).

Some of the names have become commonplace among locals, such as the Warehouse District, Fayetteville Street, and Glenwood South. Other neighborhoods lying inside the Beltline include Forest Park, Boylan Heights, Country Club Hills, Coley Forest, Five Points, Budleigh, Glenwood-Brooklyn, Hayes Barton Historic District, Moore Square, Mordecai (home to the historic Mordecai House), Rochester Heights, South Park, Rosengarten Park, Belvidere Park, Woodcrest, Oberlin Village, and Historic Oakwood. These neighborhoods were typically built before World War II, and roughly correspond to the extent of the city of Raleigh before the population boom of the latter half of the 20th century led to growth of the city limits beyond the historic urban core.

==== Midtown Raleigh ====
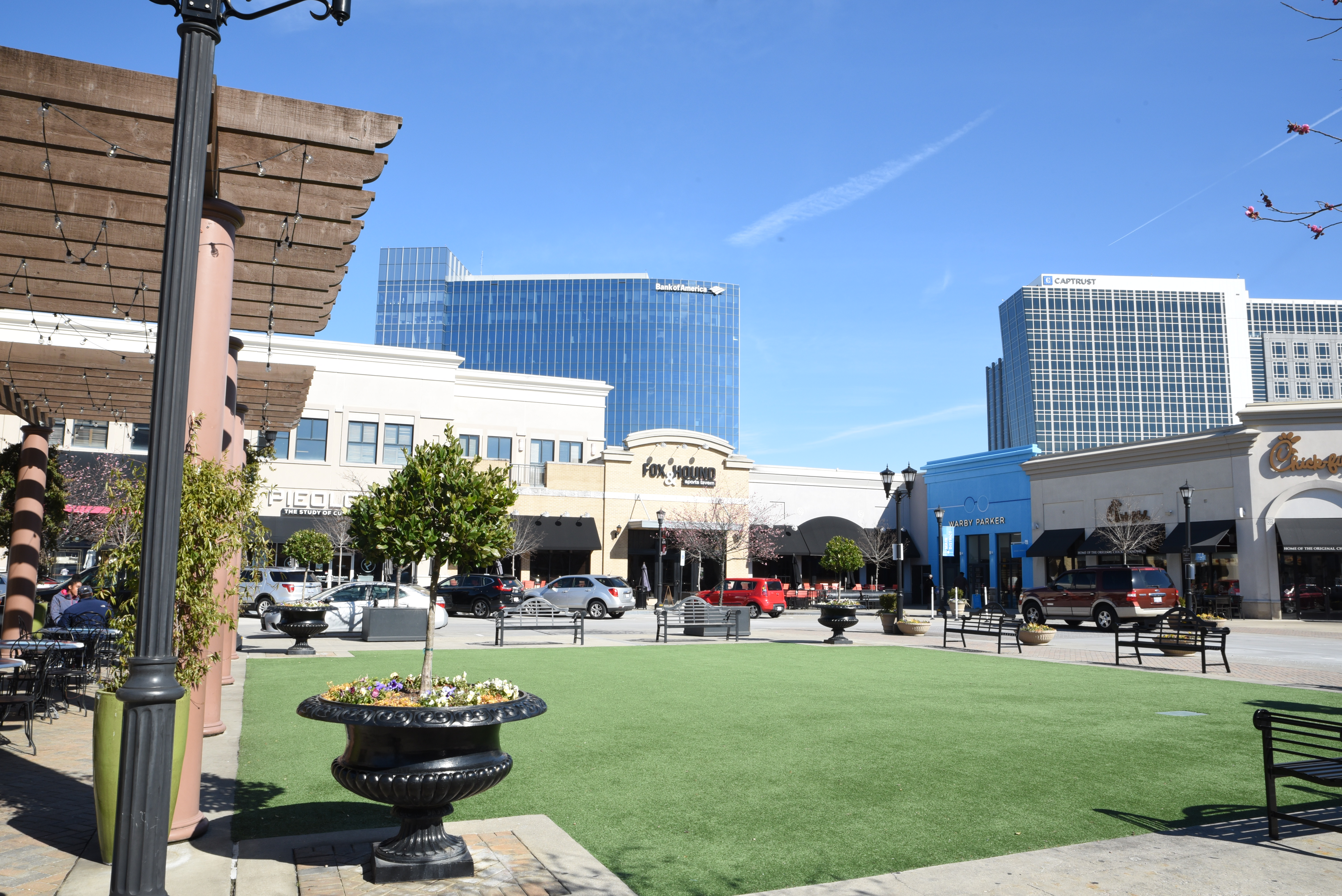
The towers at North Hills in Midtown Raleigh

Midtown Raleigh is a relatively new term used to describe the residential and commercial area lying on the northside of the I-440 Beltline and is part of North Raleigh. It is roughly framed by Glenwood/Six Forks Road to the West, Wake Forest Road to the East, and Millbrook Road to the North. It includes shopping centers such as North Hills and Crabtree Valley Mall. It also includes North Hills Park and part of the Raleigh Greenway System. The term was coined by the Greater Raleigh Chamber of Commerce, developer John Kane and planning director Mitchell Silver. The News & Observer newspaper started using the term for marketing purposes only. The Midtown Raleigh Alliance was founded on July 25, 2011, as a way for community leaders to promote the area. The center of the area, especially around the North Hills development at the junction of Six Forks Road and the Beltline, is experiencing rapid urbanization as several high-rise buildings have been built since 2010.

==== East Raleigh ====
East Raleigh is situated roughly from Capital Boulevard and the eastern side of I-440 beltline to the Neuse River, and extending as far south as Poole Road. Most of East Raleigh's development is along primary corridors such as U.S. 1 (Capital Boulevard), New Bern Avenue, Poole Road, Buffaloe Road, and New Hope Road. Neighborhoods in East Raleigh include Hedingham, Longview, Lockwood, Madonna Acres, New Hope, Thompson-Hunter and Wilder's Grove. The area is bordered to the east by the town of Knightdale.

==== West Raleigh ====
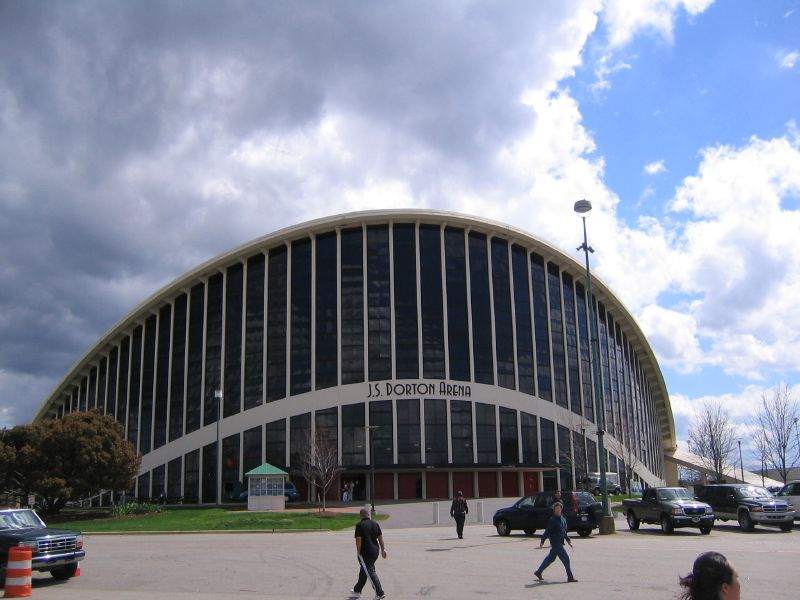
Dorton Arena in Raleigh, designed by Matthew Nowicki

West Raleigh lies along Hillsborough Street and Western Boulevard. The area is bordered to the west and south by Cary. It is home to North Carolina State University, Meredith College, Pullen Park, Pullen Memorial Baptist Church, the Islamic Association of Raleigh, Village District, Lake Johnson, the North Carolina Museum of Art and historic Saint Mary's School. Primary thoroughfares serving West Raleigh, in addition to Hillsborough Street, are Avent Ferry Road, Blue Ridge Road, and Western Boulevard. The Lenovo Center is also located here adjacent to the North Carolina State Fairgrounds. These are located approximately 2 miles from Rex Hospital.

==== North Raleigh ====
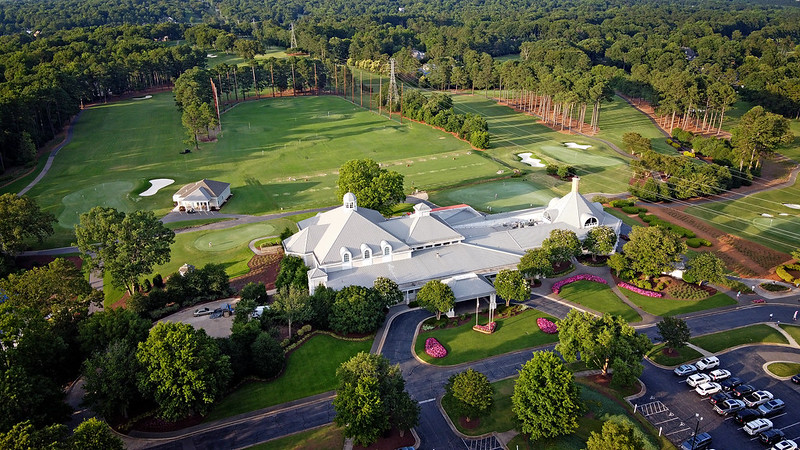
North Ridge Country Club in North Raleigh

North Raleigh is an expansive, diverse, and fast-growing suburban area of the city that is home to established neighborhoods to the south along with many newly built subdivisions and along its northern fringes. The area generally falls North of Millbrook Road. It is primarily suburban with large shopping areas. Primary neighborhoods and subdivisions in North Raleigh include Bartons Creek Bluffs, Bedford, Bent Tree, Black Horse Run, Brier Creek, Brookhaven, Coachman's Trail, Crossgate, Crosswinds, Dominion Park, Durant Trails, Ethan's Glenn, Falls River, Greystone Village, Harrington Grove, Hidden Valley, Lake Park, Long Lake, North Haven, North Ridge, Oakcroft, Shannon Woods, Six Forks Station, Springdale Estates, Stonebridge, Stone Creek, Stonehenge, Summerfield, The Sanctuary, Valley Estates, Wakefield, Weathersfield, Windsor Forest, and Wood Valley. The area is served by a number of primary transportation corridors including Glenwood Avenue US 70, I-540, Wake Forest Road, Millbrook Road, Lynn Road, Six Forks Road, Spring Forest Road, Creedmoor Road, Leesville Road, Norwood Road, Strickland Road, and North Hills Drive.

==== South Raleigh ====
South Raleigh is located along US 401 south toward Fuquay-Varina and along US 70 into suburban Garner. This area is the least developed and least dense area of Raleigh (much of the area lies within the Swift Creek watershed district, where development regulations limit housing densities and construction). The area is bordered to the west by Cary, to the east by Garner, to the southwest by Holly Springs and the southeast by Fuquay-Varina. Neighborhoods in South Raleigh include Eagle Creek, Renaissance Park, Lake Wheeler, Swift Creek, Carolina Pines, Rhamkatte, Riverbrooke and Enchanted Oaks.

==== Southeast Raleigh ====
Southeast Raleigh is bounded by downtown on the west, Garner on the southwest, and rural Wake County to the southeast. The area includes areas along Rock Quarry Road, Poole Road, and New Bern Avenue. Primary neighborhoods include Abbington Ridge, Pearl Ridge, Chastain, Chavis Heights, Raleigh Country Club, Southgate, Kingwood Forest, Rochester Heights, Emerald Village, Worthdale and Biltmore Hills. Coastal Credit Union Music Park (formerly Time Warner Cable Music Pavilion, Alltel Pavilion and Walnut Creek Amphitheatre) is one of the region's major outdoor concert venues and is located on Rock Quarry Road. Shaw University is located in this part of the city. Starting in 2020, large tracts of formerly unoccupied land along Rock Quarry Road between New Hope Road and Barwell Road, and between Barwell Road and Battle Bridge Road, have been cleared for new developments.

=== Climate ===
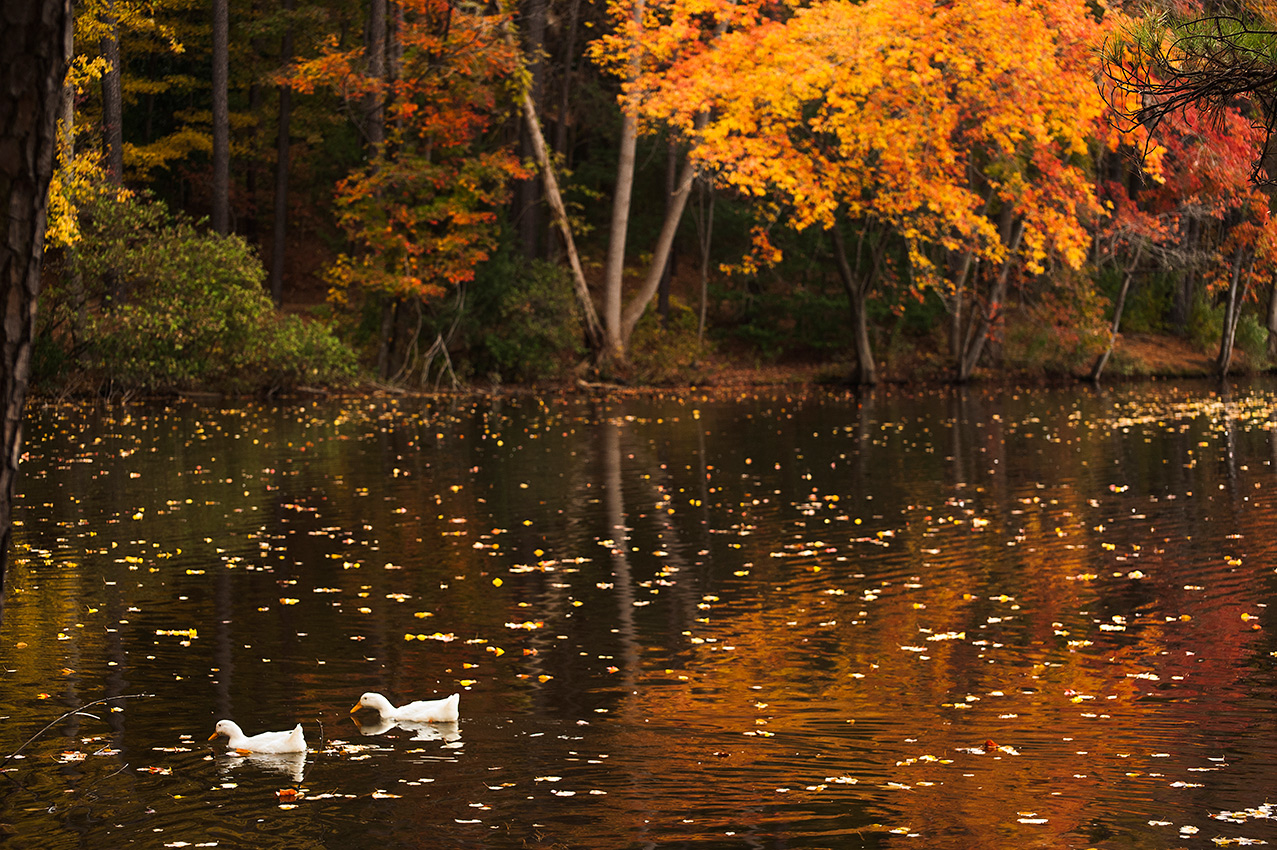
Ducks swimming at Durant Nature Preserve in the Fall

Raleigh has a four-season humid subtropical climate (Köppen: Cfa). Winters are generally cool, with a normal January daily mean temperature of 41.9 °F (5.5 °C). On average, there are 69 nights per year that drop to or below freezing, and only 2.7 days that fail to rise above freezing. Raleigh receives an average annual rainfall of 46.07 in (117.0 cm). Annual and monthly temperature and precipitation data are in chart below, based on 1991–2020 climate data. February is the driest month, with an average of 2.78 in (70.6 mm) of precipitation. Precipitation is well distributed around the year, with a slight maximum between July and September, owing to generally frequent, sometimes heavy, showers and thunderstorms, and the threat of tropical weather systems (primarily from August to early October) bringing heavy rainfall. Summers are hot and humid, with a normal July daily mean temperature of 80.5 °F (26.9 °C). There are 48 days per year with highs at or above 90 °F (32 °C). Autumn is similar to spring overall but has fewer days of rainfall, but greater potential for extremely heavy rainfall in a one/two-day period, owing to occasional threat from tropical weather systems (hurricanes and tropical storms) packing torrential rainfall. In September 1999, Raleigh recorded its wettest month ever, with over 530 mm or 21 in of rain, due to torrential rainfall from tropical weather systems, most notably Hurricane Floyd on September 15–16. Raleigh's all-time record high temperature is 106 °F (41 °C) on July 5, 2024, while the all-time record low is −9 °F (−23 °C) on January 21, 1985. Raleigh falls in USDA hardiness zones 7b (5 °F to 10 °F) and 8a (10 °F to 15 °F).

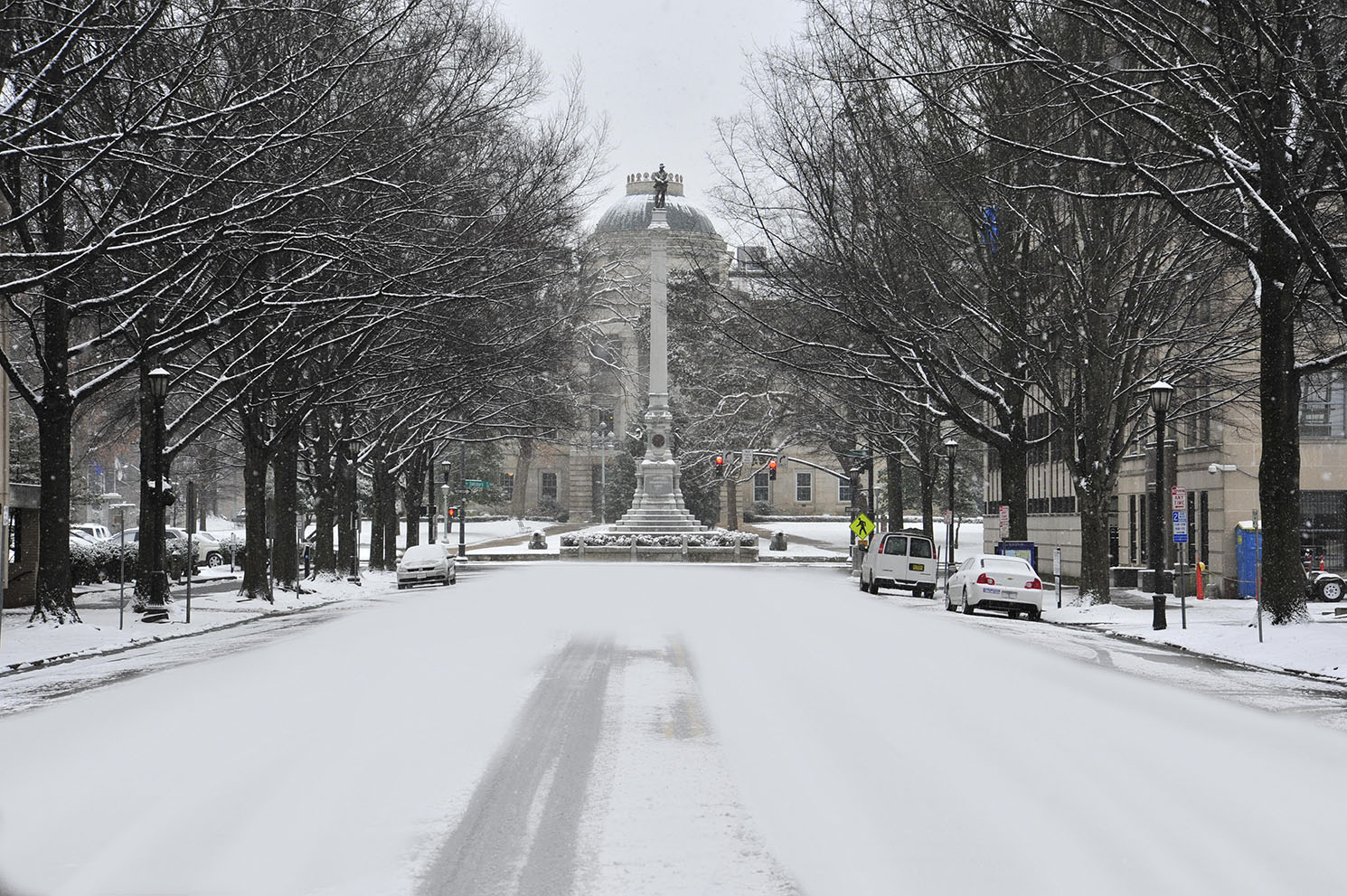
Light snow in downtown Raleigh along Hillsborough Street, 2015

Raleigh receives an average of 5.2 in (13.2 cm) of snow in winter. Freezing rain and sleet also occur most winters, and occasionally the area experiences a major damaging ice storm. On January 24–25, 2000, Raleigh received its greatest snowfall from a single storm – 20.3 in (52 cm) – the Winter Storm of January 2000. Storms of this magnitude are generally the result of cold air damming that affects the city due to its proximity to the Appalachian Mountains. Winter storms have caused traffic problems in the past as well.

The region also experiences occasional periods of drought, during which the city sometimes has restricted water use by residents. During the late summer and early fall, Raleigh can experience hurricanes. In 1996, Hurricane Fran caused severe damage in the Raleigh area, mostly from falling trees. Hurricanes Dennis and Floyd in September 1999 were primary contributors to that month's extreme rainfall of over 21 in or 530 mm. The most recent hurricane to have a considerable effect on the area was Hurricane Florence in 2018. Tornadoes also have on occasion affected the city of Raleigh, most notably the November 28, 1988, tornado which occurred in the early morning hours and rated F4 on the Fujita scale and affected northwestern portions of the city. There also was the April 16, 2011, EF3 tornado, which affected portions of downtown and northeast Raleigh and the suburb of Holly Springs.

Climate data for Raleigh–Durham International Airport, North Carolina (1991–2020 normals, (Note: Mean monthly maxima and minima (i.e. the expected highest and lowest temperature readings at any point during the year or given month) calculated based on data at said location from 1991 to 2020.) extremes 1887–present (Note: Official records for Raleigh kept January 1887 to May 17, 1944, at downtown and at Raleigh Durham Int'l since May 18, 1944. For more information, see Threadex))
Month	Jan	Feb	Mar	Apr	May	Jun	Jul	Aug	Sep	Oct	Nov	Dec	Year
Record high °F (°C)	80 (27)	85 (29)	94 (34)	95 (35)	99 (37)	105 (41)	106 (41)	105 (41)	104 (40)	100 (38)	88 (31)	84 (29)	106 (41)
Mean maximum °F (°C)	71.9 (22.2)	74.4 (23.6)	81.6 (27.6)	86.4 (30.2)	91.3 (32.9)	96.6 (35.9)	98.2 (36.8)	96.7 (35.9)	92.3 (33.5)	86.7 (30.4)	78.5 (25.8)	72.8 (22.7)	99.6 (37.6)
Mean daily maximum °F (°C)	51.9 (11.1)	55.8 (13.2)	63.3 (17.4)	72.7 (22.6)	80.0 (26.7)	87.4 (30.8)	90.8 (32.7)	88.7 (31.5)	82.5 (28.1)	73.0 (22.8)	63.0 (17.2)	54.7 (12.6)	72.0 (22.2)
Daily mean °F (°C)	41.9 (5.5)	45.0 (7.2)	51.8 (11.0)	60.8 (16.0)	68.8 (20.4)	76.7 (24.8)	80.5 (26.9)	78.8 (26.0)	72.6 (22.6)	61.7 (16.5)	51.5 (10.8)	44.6 (7.0)	61.2 (16.2)
Mean daily minimum °F (°C)	31.8 (−0.1)	34.2 (1.2)	40.3 (4.6)	48.9 (9.4)	57.7 (14.3)	66.0 (18.9)	70.2 (21.2)	68.9 (20.5)	62.7 (17.1)	50.3 (10.2)	40.0 (4.4)	34.4 (1.3)	50.4 (10.2)
Mean minimum °F (°C)	14.0 (−10.0)	19.2 (−7.1)	23.7 (−4.6)	32.2 (0.1)	42.8 (6.0)	54.2 (12.3)	61.0 (16.1)	58.7 (14.8)	48.7 (9.3)	33.2 (0.7)	24.4 (−4.2)	19.9 (−6.7)	12.1 (−11.1)
Record low °F (°C)	−9 (−23)	−2 (−19)	11 (−12)	23 (−5)	29 (−2)	38 (3)	48 (9)	46 (8)	37 (3)	19 (−7)	11 (−12)	0 (−18)	−9 (−23)
Average precipitation inches (mm)	3.43 (87)	2.78 (71)	4.10 (104)	3.53 (90)	3.58 (91)	3.89 (99)	5.02 (128)	4.71 (120)	5.15 (131)	3.37 (86)	3.32 (84)	3.39 (86)	46.07 (1,170)
Average snowfall inches (cm)	2.6 (6.6)	1.4 (3.6)	0.3 (0.76)	0.0 (0.0)	0.0 (0.0)	0.0 (0.0)	0.0 (0.0)	0.0 (0.0)	0.0 (0.0)	0.0 (0.0)	0.1 (0.25)	0.8 (2.0)	5.2 (13)
Average precipitation days (≥ 0.01 in)	10.1	9.3	10.7	9.5	9.9	11.2	11.7	10.7	9.0	7.6	8.2	9.7	117.6
Average snowy days (≥ 0.1 in)	1.2	1.2	0.4	0.0	0.0	0.0	0.0	0.0	0.0	0.0	0.1	0.5	3.4
Average relative humidity (%)	66.5	64.1	63.0	61.7	71.1	73.6	76.0	77.9	77.1	73.3	69.1	68.5	70.2
Average dew point °F (°C)	26.8 (−2.9)	28.2 (−2.1)	35.8 (2.1)	43.3 (6.3)	55.2 (12.9)	63.5 (17.5)	67.8 (19.9)	67.5 (19.7)	61.5 (16.4)	49.3 (9.6)	39.4 (4.1)	31.1 (−0.5)	47.5 (8.6)
Mean monthly sunshine hours	163.8	173.1	228.9	250.7	258.4	267.7	259.5	239.6	217.6	215.4	174.0	157.6	2,606.3
Percentage possible sunshine	53	57	62	64	59	61	58	57	58	62	56	52	59
Average ultraviolet index	3	4	6	7	9	10	10	9	8	5	3	2	6
Source 1: NOAA (relative humidity, dew point, and sun 1961–1990)
Source 2: Weather Atlas (UV Index)

== Demographics ==
Historical population
Census	Pop.	Note	%±
1800	669		—
1810	976		45.9%
1820	2,674		174.0%
1830	1,700		−36.4%
1840	2,244		32.0%
1850	4,518		101.3%
1860	4,780		5.8%
1870	7,790		63.0%
1880	9,265		18.9%
1890	12,678		36.8%
1900	13,643		7.6%
1910	19,218		40.9%
1920	24,418		27.1%
1930	37,379		53.1%
1940	46,879		25.4%
1950	65,679		40.1%
1960	93,931		43.0%
1970	122,830		30.8%
1980	150,255		22.3%
1990	212,092		41.2%
2000	276,093		30.2%
2010	403,892		46.3%
2020	467,665		15.8%
2025 (est.)	506,306	▲	8.3%
U.S. Decennial Census; 2010–2020

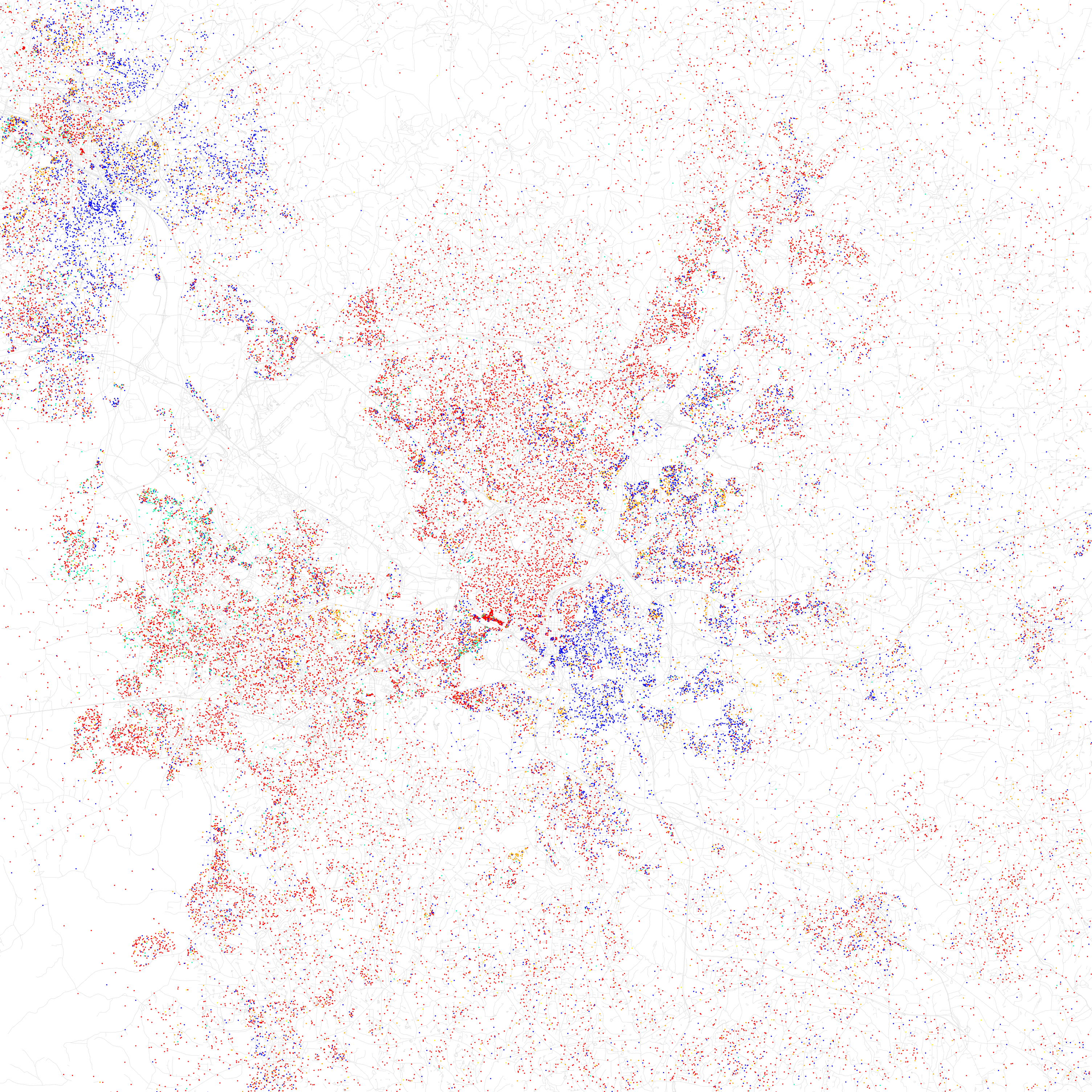
Map of racial distribution in Raleigh, 2010 U.S. census. Each dot is 25 people: ⬤ White ⬤ Black ⬤ Asian ⬤ Hispanic ⬤ Other

As of the 2020 census, there were 467,665 people, 188,412 households, and 104,848 families residing in the city. In the American Community Survey of 2019, the city of Raleigh's population was estimated at 474,708; an earlier estimate determined the population at 474,069. At the 2000 census, there were 276,093 persons (July 2008 estimate was 380,173) and 61,371 families residing in Raleigh. The population density was 2,409.2 people per square mile (930.2 people/km^{2}). There were 120,699 housing units at an average density of 1,053.2 per square mile (406.6/km^{2}).

There were 112,608 households in the city in 2000, of which 26.5% included children below the age of 18, 39.5% were composed of married couples living together, 11.4% reported a female householder with no husband present, and 45.5% classified themselves as nonfamily. Unmarried partners were present in 2.2% of households. In addition, 33.1% of all households were composed of individuals living alone, of which 6.2% was someone 65 years of age or older. The average household size in Raleigh was 2.30 persons, and the average family size was 2.97 persons. Raleigh's population in 2000 was evenly distributed with 20.9% below the age of 18, 15.9% aged 18 to 24, 36.6% from 25 to 44, and 18.4% from 45 to 64. An estimated 8.3% of the population was 65 years of age or older, and the median age was 31 years. For every 100 females, there were 98.0 males; for every 100 females aged 18 or older, there were 96.6 males aged 18 or older.

The median household income in the city was $46,612 in 2000, and the median family income was $60,003. Males earned a median income of $39,248, versus $30,656 for females. The median per capita income for the city was $25,113, and an estimated 11.5% of the population and 7.1% of families were living below the poverty line. Of the total population, 18.8% of those below the age of 18, and 9.3% of those 65 and older, were living below the poverty line. In 2019, an estimated 10.9% of the local population were at or below the poverty line. The median household income from 2014 to 2018 was $63,891 and the per capita income was $36,875. There were 180,046 households with an average of 2.43 persons per household. The median value of an owner-occupied housing unit was $236,700 in 2018 and the monthly cost with a mortgage was $1,480. The cost without a mortgage was $526. Raleigh had a median gross rent of $1,074.

=== Racial and ethnic composition ===
Raleigh city, North Carolina – Racial and ethnic composition Note: the U.S. census treats Hispanic/Latino as an ethnic category. This table excludes Latinos from the racial categories and assigns them to a separate category. Hispanics/Latinos may be of any race.
Race / Ethnicity (NH = Non-Hispanic)	Pop 2000	Pop 2010	Pop 2020	% 2000	% 2010	% 2020
White alone (NH)	166,386	215,204	241,308	60.26%	53.28%	51.60%
Black or African American alone (NH)	75,931	115,976	120,480	27.50%	28.71%	25.76%
Native American or Alaska Native alone (NH)	795	1,019	1,094	0.29%	0.25%	0.23%
Asian alone (NH)	9,282	17,309	23,444	3.36%	4.29%	5.01%
Native Hawaiian or Pacific Islander alone (NH)	100	139	179	0.04%	0.03%	0.04%
Other race alone (NH)	377	828	2,647	0.14%	0.21%	0.57%
Mixed race or Multiracial (NH)	3,914	7,549	17,999	1.42%	1.87%	3.85%
Hispanic or Latino (any race)	19,308	45,868	60,514	6.99%	11.36%	12.94%
Total	276,093	403,892	467,665	100.00%	100.00%	100.00%

The racial makeup of Raleigh in 2023 was 52.5% non-Hispanic White, 28.1% Black or African American, 0.3% American Indian or Alaska Native, 4.5% Asian American, 0.1% from some other race, 6.9% two or more races, 11.6% Hispanic or Latin American of any race. According to the 2010 United States census, the racial composition of the city was: 57.5% White (53.3% non-Hispanic White), 29.3% Black or African American, 4.3% Asian American (1.2% Indian, 0.8% Chinese, 0.7% Vietnamese, 0.5% Korean, 0.4% Filipino, 0.1% Japanese), 2.6% two or more races, 1.4% some other race, 0.5% Native American, and <0.1% Native Hawaiian or other Pacific Islander In addition, 11.4% of city residents were Hispanic or Latino Americans, of any race (5.9% Mexican, 1.1% Puerto Rican, 0.9% Salvadoran, 0.6% Dominican, 0.6% Honduran, 0.3% Colombian, 0.3% Cuban, 0.2% Guatemalan, 0.2% Spanish, 0.2% Peruvian, 0.1% Venezuelan, 0.1% Ecuadorian, 0.1% Argentine, and 0.1% Panamanian). In 2000, the racial composition of the city was: 63.31% White, 27.80% Black or African American, 7.01% Hispanic or Latino American, 3.38% Asian American, 0.36% Native American, 0.04% Native Hawaiian or other Pacific Islander, 3.24% some other race, and 1.88% two or more races.

=== Religion ===
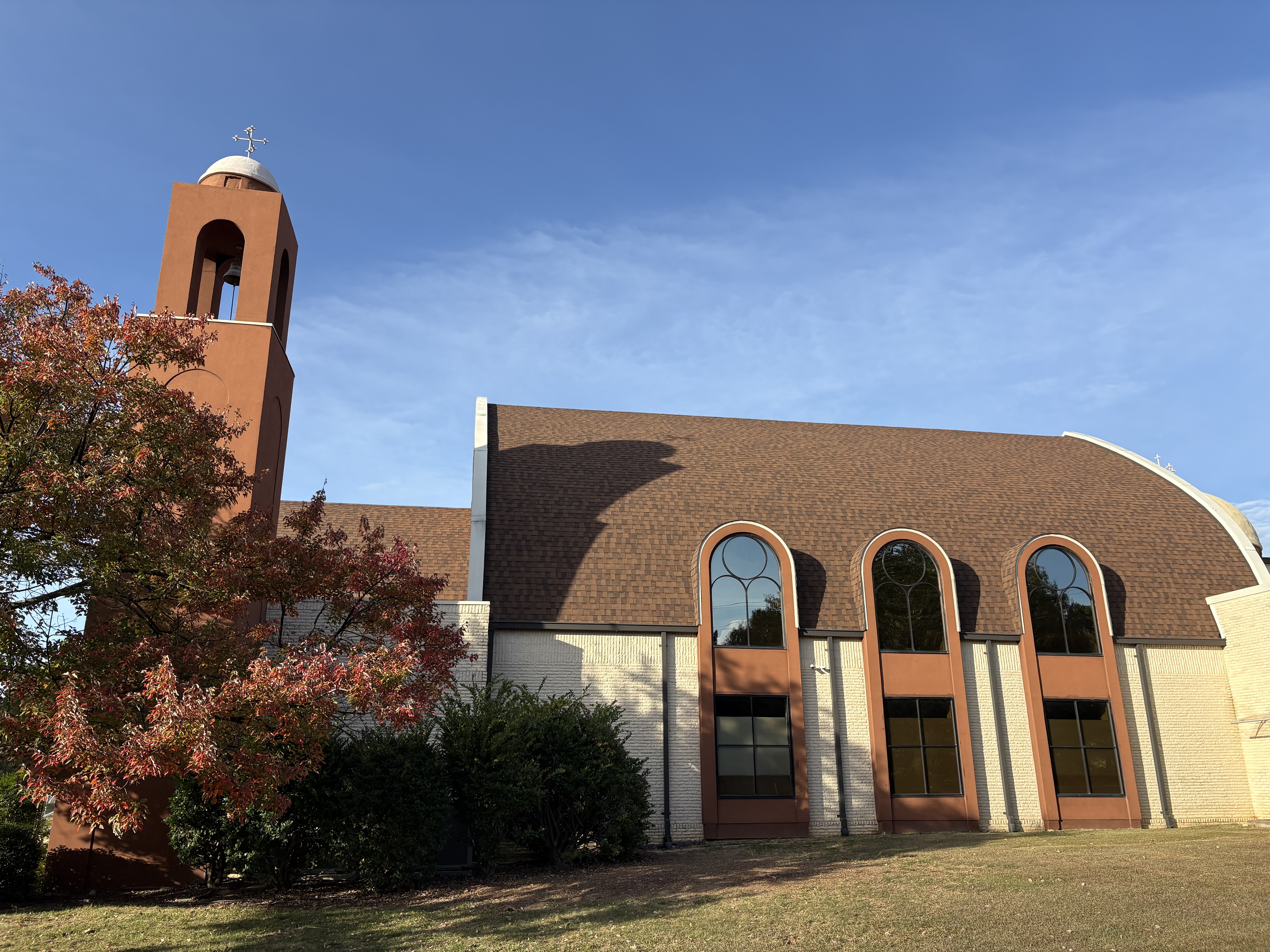
St. Mary Coptic Orthodox Cathedral in 2025.

Raleigh is home to a wide variety of religious practitioners. The predominant religion in Raleigh is Christianity, with the largest numbers of adherents being Baptist (14.1%), Methodist (5.6%), and Roman Catholic (4.2%). Others include Presbyterianism (2.8%), Pentecostalism (1.7%), Anglicanism/Episcopalianism (1.2%), Lutheranism (0.6%), the Latter-Day Saints (0.7%), and other Christian denominations (10.2%) including the Eastern Orthodox, Oriental Orthodox, Jehovah's Witness, Christian Science, Christian Unitarianism, other Mainline Protestant groups, and non-denominational Christians. The Roman Catholic Diocese of Raleigh, the Episcopal Diocese of North Carolina, the Coptic Orthodox Diocese of South Carolina, North Carolina, and Kentucky, the North Carolina Annual Conference of the United Methodist Church, and the New Hope Presbytery of the Presbyterian Church (USA) are all headquartered in Raleigh.

Other religions, including Hinduism, Buddhism, Baháʼí, Druze, Taoism, and Shintoism make up 1.31% of religious practitioners. Judaism (0.9%) and Islam (0.8%) are also practiced.

In Wake County, 29% of the population are affiliated with the Southern Baptist Convention, 22% are affiliated with the Catholic Church, 17% are affiliated with the United Methodist Church, 6% are affiliated with the Presbyterian Church (USA), and 27% are religiously affiliated with other denominations, religions, or are not religiously affiliated.

=== Crime ===
According to the City of Raleigh Crime Statistical Overview, in 2022, the Raleigh Police Department and other agencies in the city reported 1,797 incidents of violent crime and 11,537 incidents of property crime – making property crime about 24% higher than the national average and violent crime about 2% higher than the national average. Of the violent crimes reported, 43 were murders, 178 were rape/sexual assaults 458 were robberies, and 1,118 were aggravated assaults. Property crimes included burglaries which accounted for 1,191, larcenies for 9,018, and Motor vehicle theft accounted for 1,283 incidents out of the total.

== Economy ==
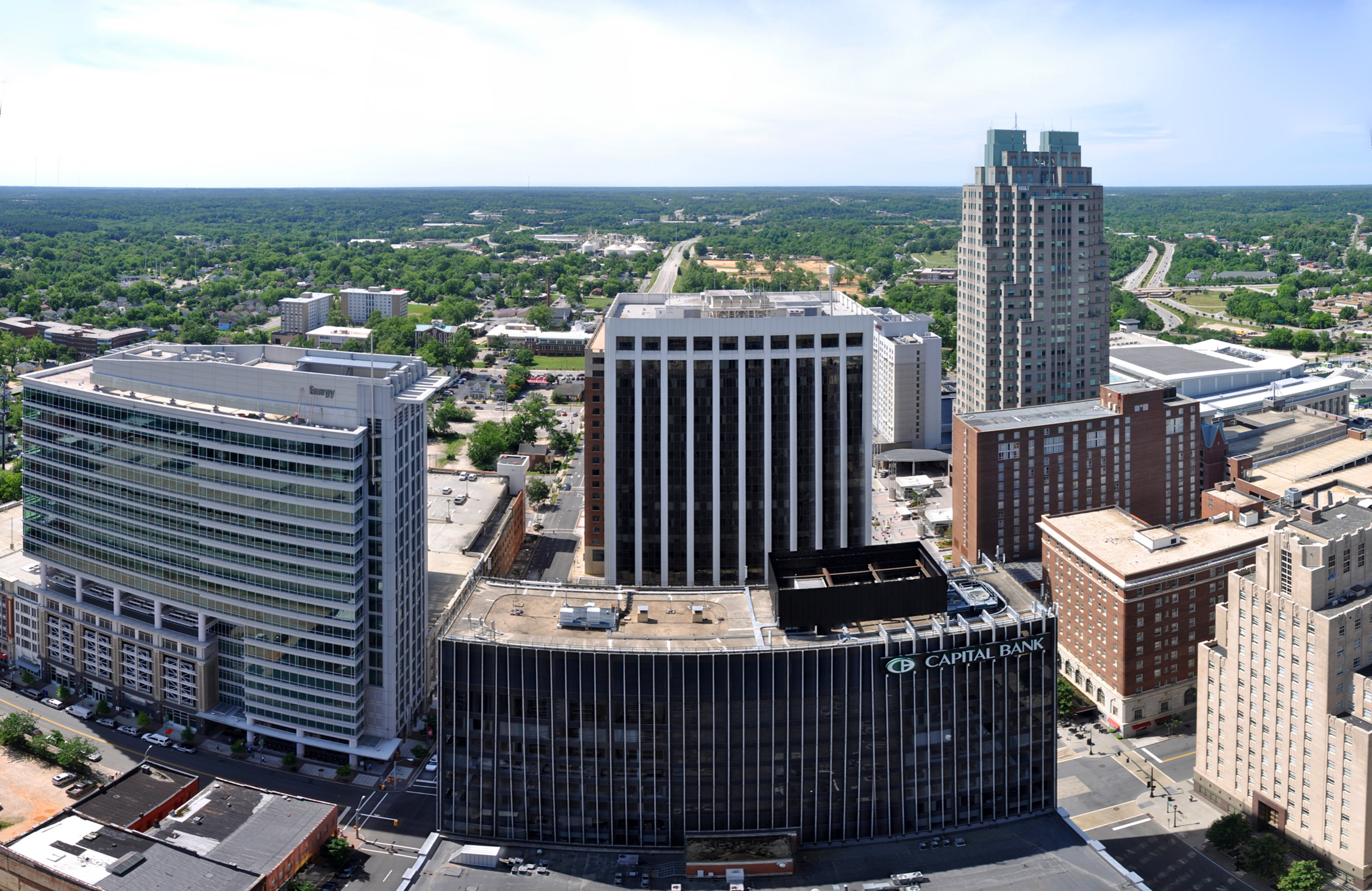
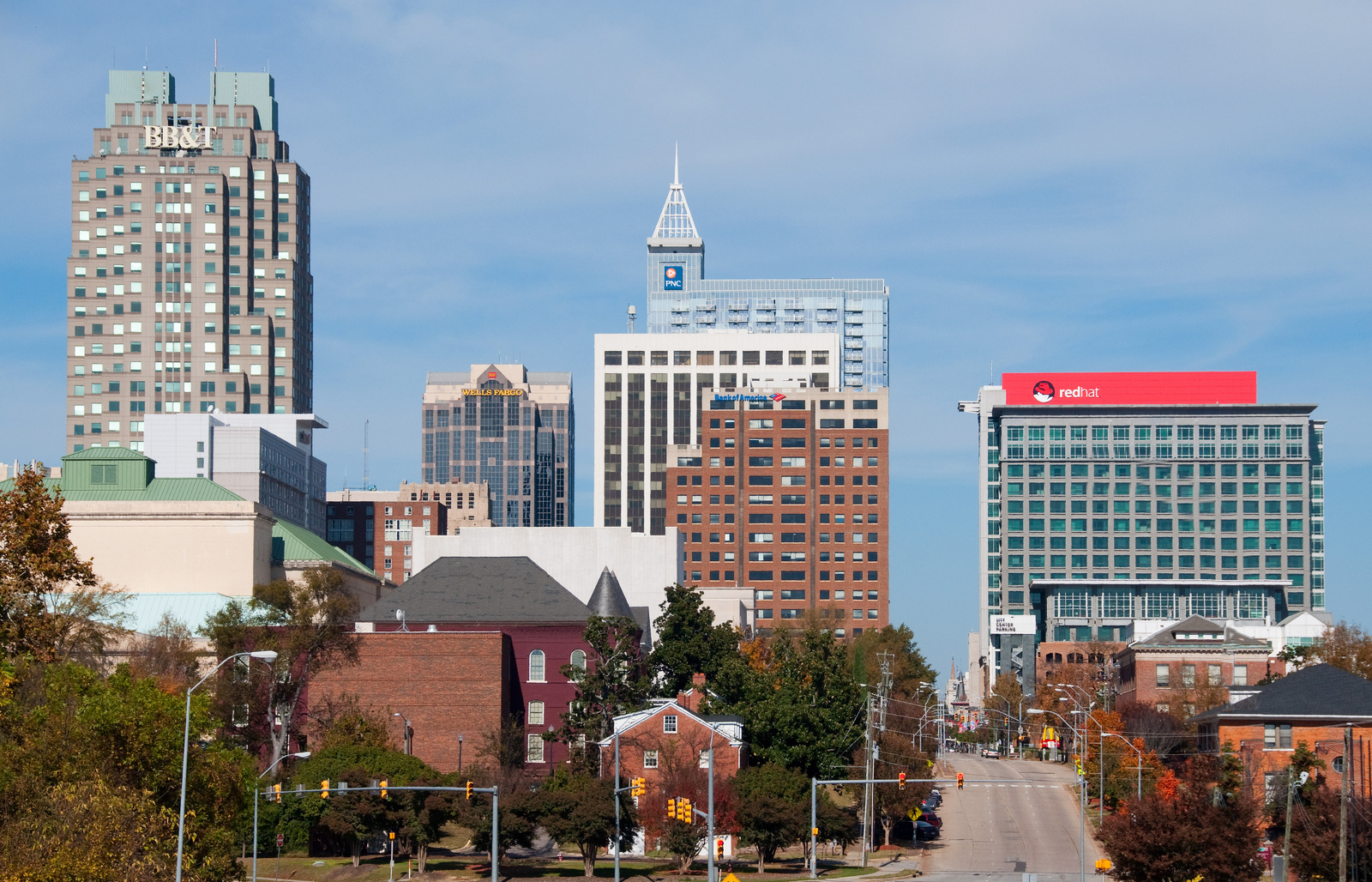
Raleigh's downtown

Raleigh's industrial base includes financial services, electrical, medical, electronic and telecommunications equipment, clothing and apparel, food processing, paper products, and pharmaceuticals. Raleigh is part of North Carolina's Research Triangle, one of the country's largest and most successful research parks, and a major center in the United States for high-tech and biotech research, as well as advanced textile development. The city is a major retail shipping point for eastern North Carolina and a wholesale distributing point for the grocery industry.

The healthcare and pharmaceutical industry has experienced major growth in recent years with many companies based in Raleigh including PRA Health Sciences, Chiesi USA (subsidiary of Chiesi Farmaceutici), formerly Mallinckrodt prior to tax inversion to Ireland, MAKO Surgical Corp., Metabolon, Inc., TearScience, and American Board of Anesthesiology.

Companies based in Raleigh include Advance Auto Parts, Bandwidth, Building Materials Holding Corporation, Capitol Broadcasting Company, First Citizens BancShares, Golden Corral, Japan Tobacco International, Martin Marietta Materials, PRA Health Sciences, Red Hat, Vontier, Waste Industries, and Lulu.

Social Blade, a website that tracks social media statistics and analytics, and Temple Run developer Imangi Studios are based in Raleigh.

The North Carolina Air National Guard, a unit of the Air National Guard, is also headquartered in Raleigh.

In April 2014 Steven P. Rosenthal of Northland Investment Corp. referred to Raleigh as "a real concentration of brain power. You have a lot of smart people living in the same place. That will drive the economy."

=== Top employers ===
According to Raleigh's 2025 Annual Comprehensive Financial Report, the principal employers in the city are:

#	Employer	No. of employees
1	State of North Carolina	24,083
2	Wake County Public School System	17,000
3	WakeMed Health and Hospitals	10,307
4	Food Lion	9,037
5	North Carolina State University	9,019
6	Target Stores	8,400
7	UNC Rex Healthcare	7,700
8	Harris Teeter	5,300
9	Wake County Duke Energy Progress	4,389
10	City of Raleigh	3,974

== Arts and culture ==
=== Museums ===
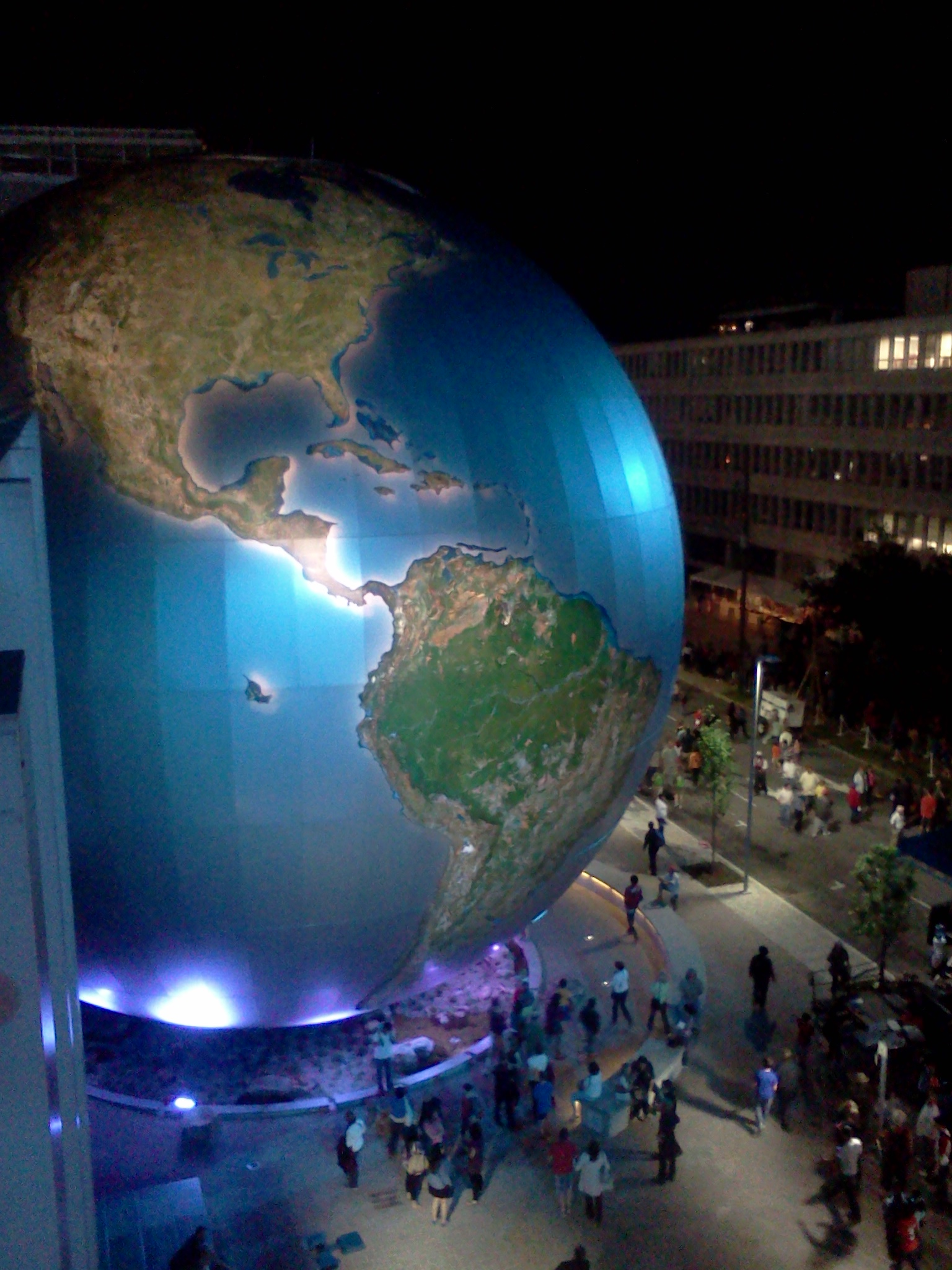
The SECU Daily Planet, part of the North Carolina Museum of Natural Sciences Nature Research Center

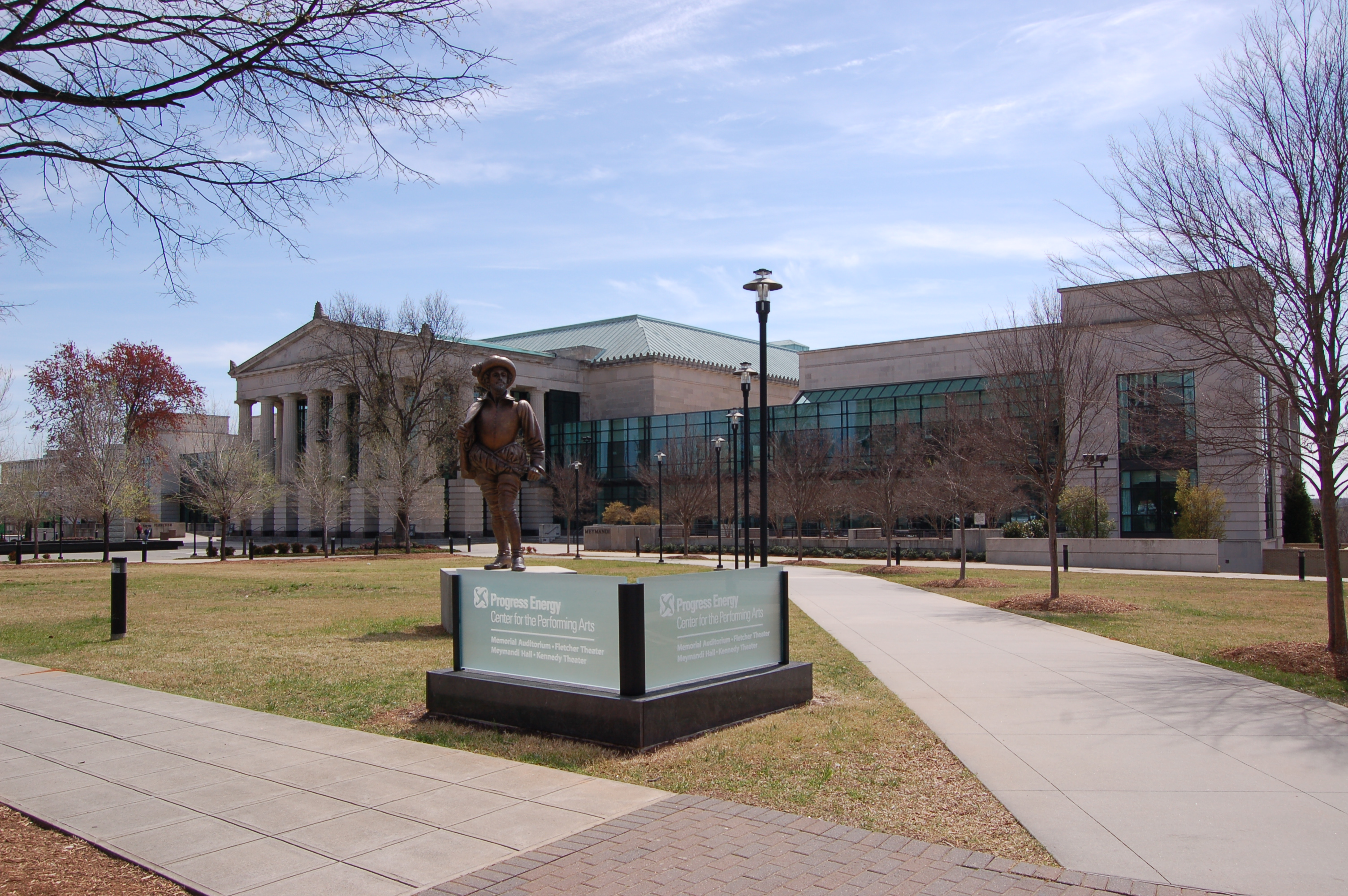
Progress Energy Center for the Performing Arts, 2008

- African American Cultural Complex
- Contemporary Art Museum of Raleigh
- Gregg Museum of Art & Design at North Carolina State University
- Haywood Hall House & Gardens
- Marbles Kids Museum
- North Carolina Museum of Art
- North Carolina Museum of History
- North Carolina Museum of Natural Sciences
- North Carolina Sports Hall of Fame
- City of Raleigh Museum
- J. C. Raulston Arboretum
- Joel Lane House
- Mordecai Plantation
- Pope House Museum

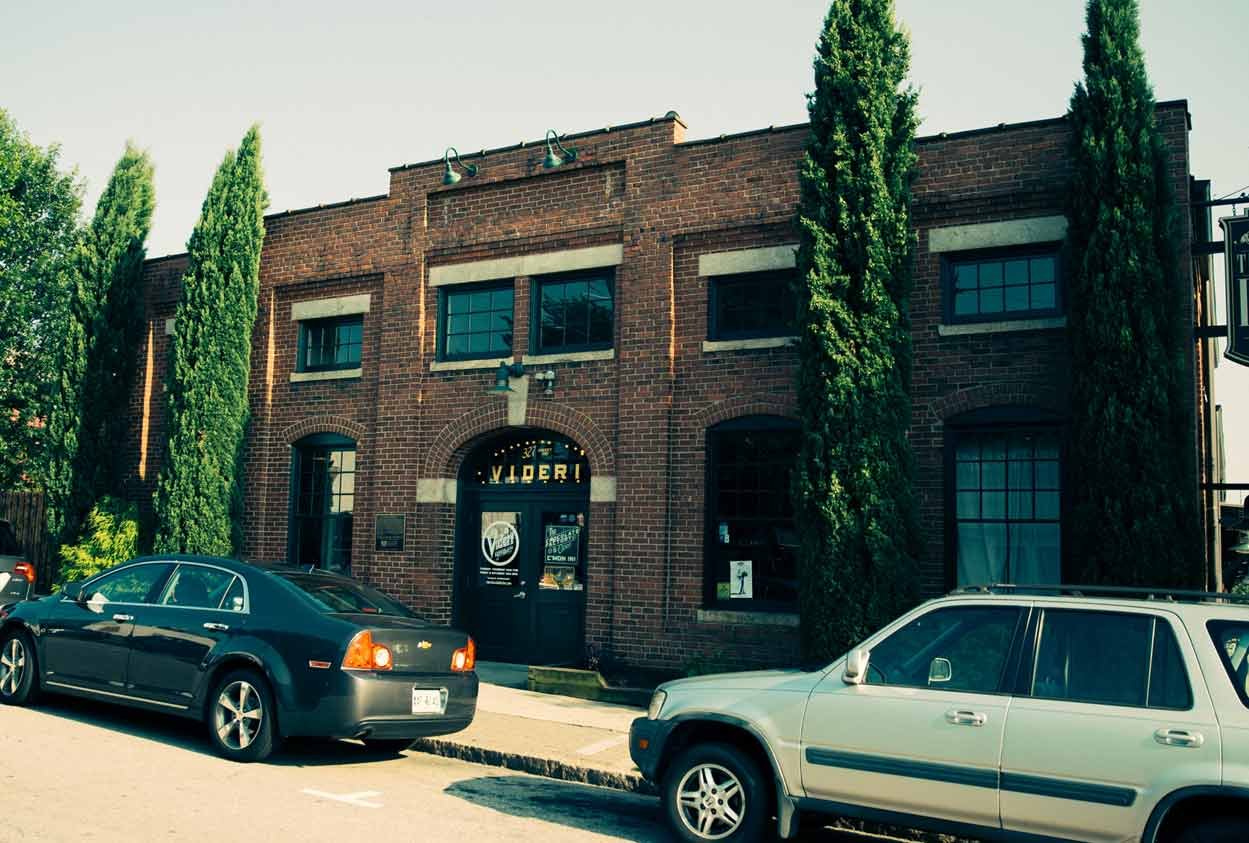
The Videri Chocolate Factory in the Warehouse District

=== Performing arts ===
The Coastal Credit Union Music Park at Walnut Creek hosts major international touring acts. In 2011, the Downtown Raleigh Amphitheater opened (now sponsored as the Red Hat Amphitheater), which hosts numerous concerts primarily in the summer months. An additional amphitheater sits on the grounds of the North Carolina Museum of Art, which hosts a summer concert series and outdoor movies. Nearby Cary is home to the Koka Booth Amphitheatre which hosts additional summer concerts and outdoor movies, and serves as the venue for regularly scheduled outdoor concerts by the North Carolina Symphony based in Raleigh. During the North Carolina State Fair, Dorton Arena hosts headline acts. The private Lincoln Theatre is one of several clubs in downtown Raleigh that schedules many concerts throughout the year in multiple formats (rock, pop, country).

The Duke Energy Center for the Performing Arts complex houses the Raleigh Memorial Auditorium, the Fletcher Opera Theater, the Kennedy Theatre, and the Meymandi Concert Hall. In 2008, a new theatre space, the Meymandi Theatre at the Murphey School, was opened in the restored auditorium of the historic Murphey School. Theater performances are also offered at the Raleigh Little Theatre, Long View Center, Ira David Wood III Pullen Park Theatre, and Stewart and Thompson Theaters at North Carolina State University.

Raleigh is home to several professional arts organizations, including the North Carolina Symphony, the Opera Company of North Carolina, Theatre in the Park, Burning Coal Theatre Company, the North Carolina Theatre, Broadway Series South and the Carolina Ballet. The numerous local colleges and universities significantly add to the options available for viewing live performances.

=== Visual arts ===
North Carolina Museum of Art, occupying a large suburban campus on Blue Ridge Road near the North Carolina State Fairgrounds, maintains one of the premier public art collections located between Washington, D.C., and Atlanta. In addition to its extensive collections of American Art, European Art and ancient art, the museum recently has hosted major exhibitions featuring Auguste Rodin (in 2000) and Claude Monet (in 2006–07), each attracting more than 200,000 visitors. Unlike most prominent public museums, the North Carolina Museum of Art acquired a large number of the works in its permanent collection through purchases with public funds. The museum's outdoor park is one of the largest such art parks in the country. The museum facility underwent a major expansion which greatly expanded the exhibit space that was completed in 2010. The 127,000 sf new expansion is designed by NYC architect Thomas Phifer and Partners.

Raleigh's downtown is also home to many local art galleries such as Art Space in City Market, Visual Art Exchange, and 311 Gallery, on Martin Street, and Bee Hive Studios on Hargett Street. CAM Raleigh is a downtown contemporary art museum, also on Martin Street, that serves to promote new artists and does not house a permanent collection. CAM Raleigh was designed by the award-winning architectural firm Brooks+Scarpa of Los Angeles.

== Sports ==
Professional sports teams
Team	League	Venue (capacity)	Since	Titles
Carolina Hurricanes	National Hockey League	Lenovo Center (18,700)	1997	2
North Carolina FC	United Soccer League	WakeMed Soccer Park (10,000)	2006	1
North Carolina Courage	National Women's Soccer League	WakeMed Soccer Park (10,000)	2017	2

=== Professional ===
The National Hockey League's Carolina Hurricanes franchise moved to Raleigh in 1997 from Hartford, Connecticut (where it was known as the Hartford Whalers). The team played its first two seasons more than 60 miles away at Greensboro Coliseum while its home arena, Raleigh Entertainment and Sports Arena (later RBC Center and now Lenovo Center), was under construction. The Hurricanes are the only major league (NFL, NHL, NBA, MLB) professional sports team in North Carolina to have won a championship, winning the Stanley Cup in 2006 and 2026. The city played host to the 2011 NHL All-Star Game.

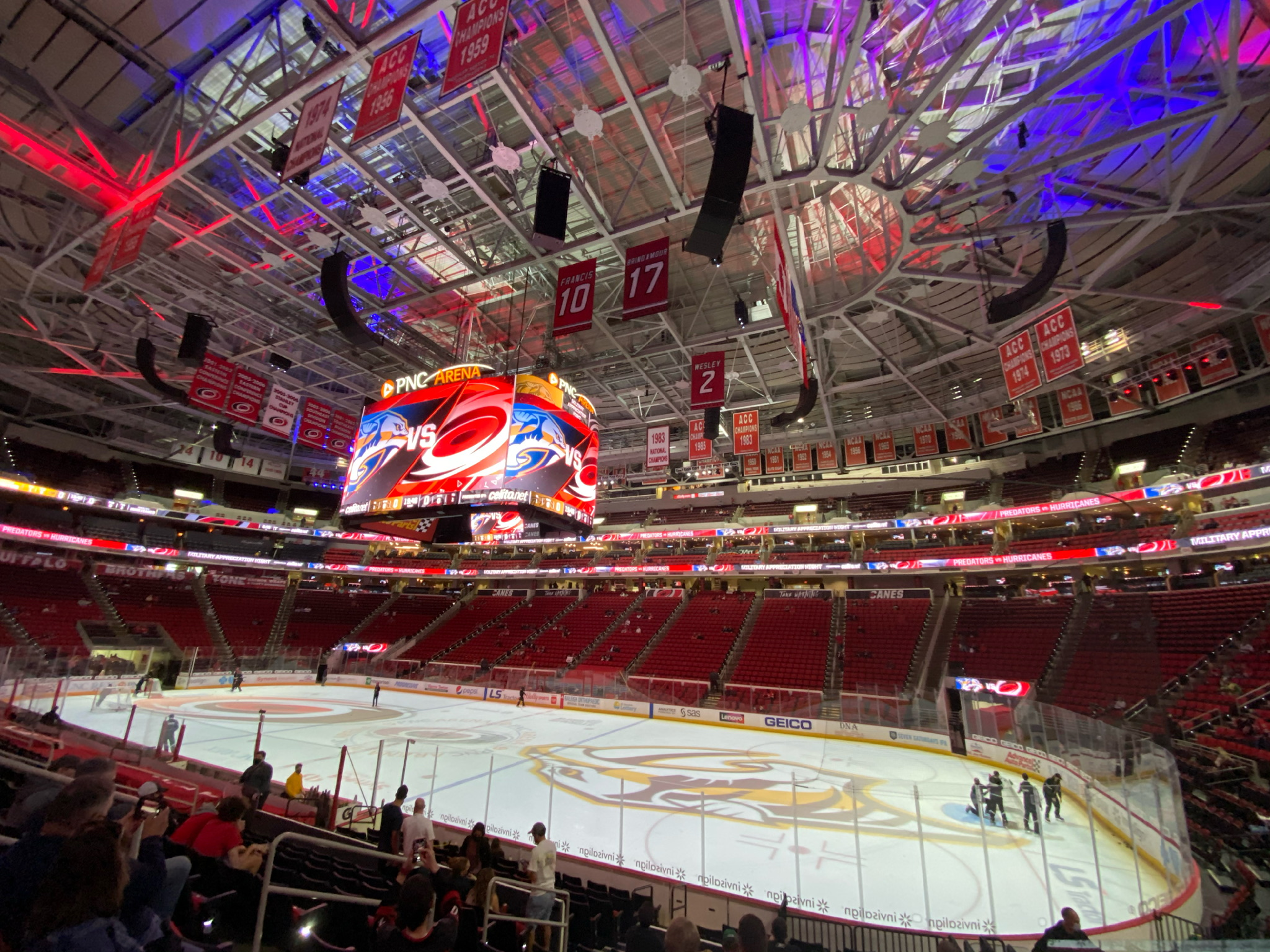
The Lenovo Center in Raleigh

In addition to the Hurricanes, the North Carolina FC of the United Soccer League Championship and North Carolina Courage of the National Women’s Soccer League play in suburban Cary to the west; the Carolina Mudcats, a Single-A minor-league baseball team, play in the city's eastern suburbs; the newly formed Single-A minor-league baseball Fayetteville Woodpeckers, who formerly played in Buies Creek, began play in the nearby out-of-county southern suburb of Fayetteville when their new ballpark opened in 2019; the Carolina Flyers of the American Ultimate Disc League play primarily at Cardinal Gibbons High School near the Lenovo Center; and the Durham Bulls, the AAA minor-league baseball team made internationally famous by the movie Bull Durham, play in the neighboring city of Durham. The Raleigh Firebirds of The Basketball League play at St. Augustine's University.

Several other professional sports leagues have had former franchises (now defunct) in Raleigh, including the Raleigh IceCaps of the ECHL (1991–1998); Carolina Cobras of the Arena Football League (2000–2004); the Raleigh–Durham Skyhawks of the World League of American Football (1991); the Raleigh Bullfrogs of the Global Basketball Association (1991–1992); the Raleigh Cougars of the United States Basketball League (1997–1999); and most recently, the Carolina Courage of the Women's United Soccer Association (2000–2001 in Chapel Hill, 2001–2003 in suburban Cary), which won that league's championship Founders Cup in 2002.

The Raleigh area has hosted the Professional Golfers' Association (PGA) Nationwide Tour Rex Hospital Open since 1994, with the current location of play at Raleigh's Country Club at Wakefield Plantation. Nearby Prestonwood Country Club hosts the PGA SAS Championship every fall.

=== Collegiate ===
North Carolina State University is located in southwest Raleigh where the Wolfpack competes nationally in 24 intercollegiate varsity sports as a member of the Atlantic Coast Conference. The university's football team plays in Carter–Finley Stadium, the second largest football stadium in North Carolina, while the men's basketball team shares the Lenovo Center with the Carolina Hurricanes hockey club. The Wolfpack women's basketball, volleyball, and gymnastics as well as men's wrestling events are held on campus at Reynolds Coliseum. The men's baseball team plays at Doak Field.

=== Amateur ===
The North Carolina Tigers compete as an Australian rules football club in the United States Australian Football League, in the Eastern Australian Football League.

The Raleigh Cú Chulainn Gaelic Athletic Association competes in men's and women's Gaelic Football, Hurling, and Camogie. It is a member in the Southeast Division of the United States Gaelic Athletic Association and the Gaelic Athletic Association based in Ireland. The Raleigh GAA won the Junior B Men's Football national championship in 2014. The Raleigh GAA and the North Carolina Tigers Australian rules football clubs compete in the annual Oak City Cup where both clubs compete under the compromise football rules adapted by Ireland and Australia for international competition.

Raleigh is also home to one of the Cheer Extreme All Stars gyms. In 2009 and again in 2010, Cheer Extreme Raleigh's Small Senior Level 5 Team were silver medalists at the Cheerleading Worlds Competition in Orlando, Florida, and in 2012 they received the bronze medal. Raleigh is also home to one of the Southeast's premier Hardcourt Bike Polo clubs.

Because of the area's many billiards rooms, Raleigh is home to one of the largest amateur league franchises for playing pool, the Raleigh, Durham, Chapel Hill American Poolplayers Association. There are leagues available in formats for players of any skill level.

== Parks and recreation ==
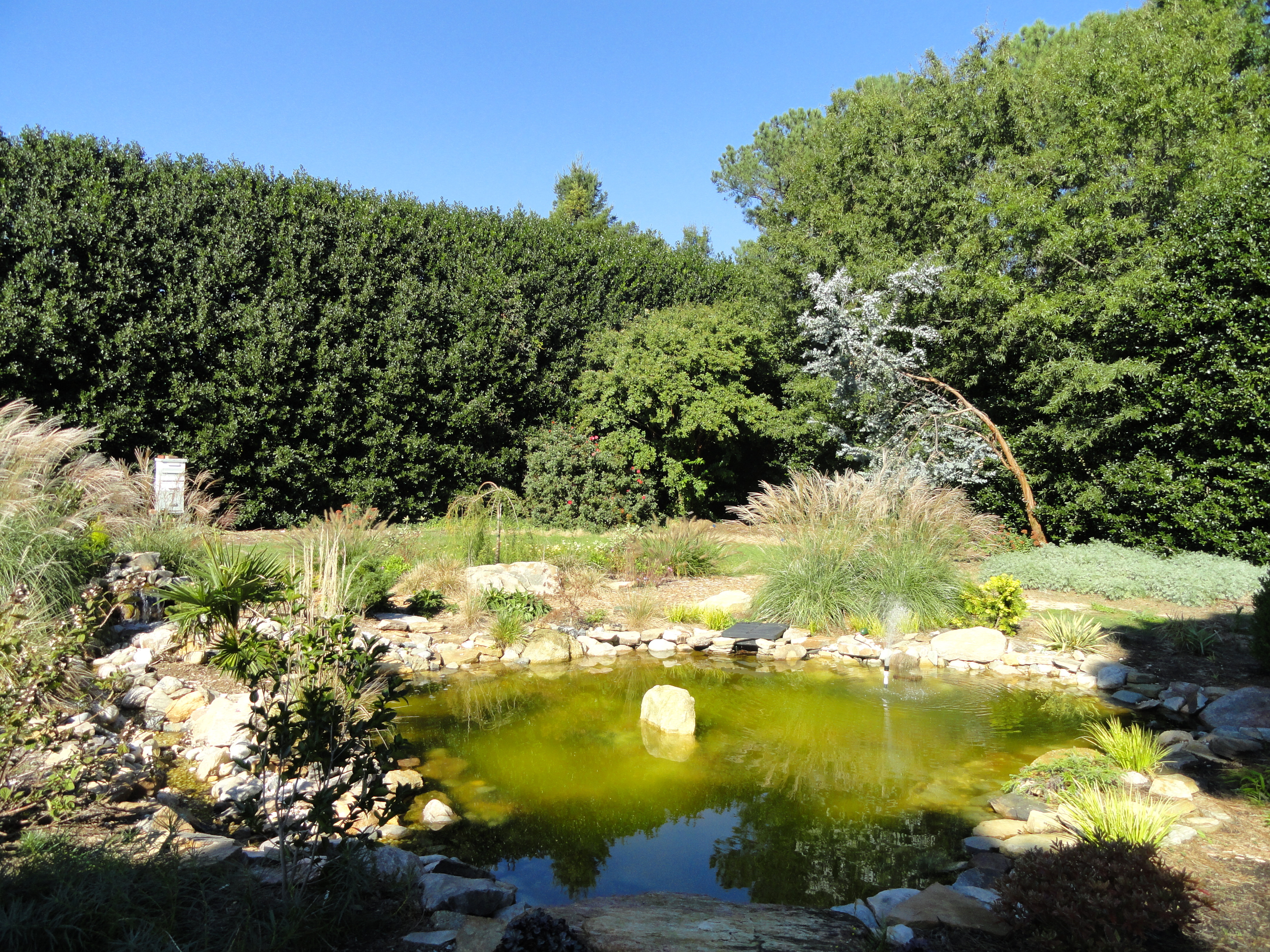
JC Raulston Arboretum

Raleigh is the home of Raleigh Kubb, both a competitive and non-competitive kubb club. Raleigh Kubb hosts kubb tournaments benefitting various charities in the Raleigh area.

The Raleigh Parks and Recreation Department offers a wide variety of leisure opportunities at more than 200 sites throughout the city, which include: 8,100 acres (33 km^{2}) of park land, 78 mi (126 km) of greenway, 22 community centers, a BMX championship-caliber race track, 112 tennis courts among 25 locations, 5 public lakes, and 8 public aquatic facilities. The park system includes the historic Pullen Park, the oldest public park in North Carolina. The J. C. Raulston Arboretum, an 8-acre (32,000 m^{2}) arboretum and botanical garden in west Raleigh administered by North Carolina State University, maintains a year-round collection that is open daily to the public without charge.

== Government ==
The Governor's Mansion in Raleigh.

Historically, Raleigh voters have tended to elect conservative Democrats in local, state, and national elections, a holdover from their one-party system of the late 19th century.

=== City Council ===
Raleigh operates under a council-manager government. Raleigh City Council consists of eight members; all seats, including the Mayor's, are open for election every two years. Five of the council seats are district representatives and two seats are citywide representatives elected at-large.

- Janet Cowell, Mayor
- Jonathan Melton, Council Member, At-large
- Stormie Forte, Council Member, At-large
- Mitchell Silver, Council Member (District A, north-central Raleigh)
- Megan Patton, Council Member (District B, northeast Raleigh)
- Corey Branch, Council Member (District C, southeast Raleigh)
- Jane Harrison, Council Member (District D, southwest Raleigh)
- Christina Jones, Council Member (District E, west and northwest Raleigh)

== Education ==
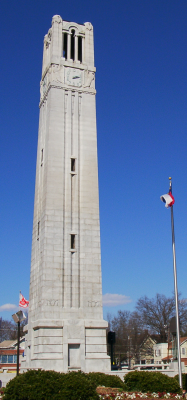
Memorial Bell Tower at North Carolina State University

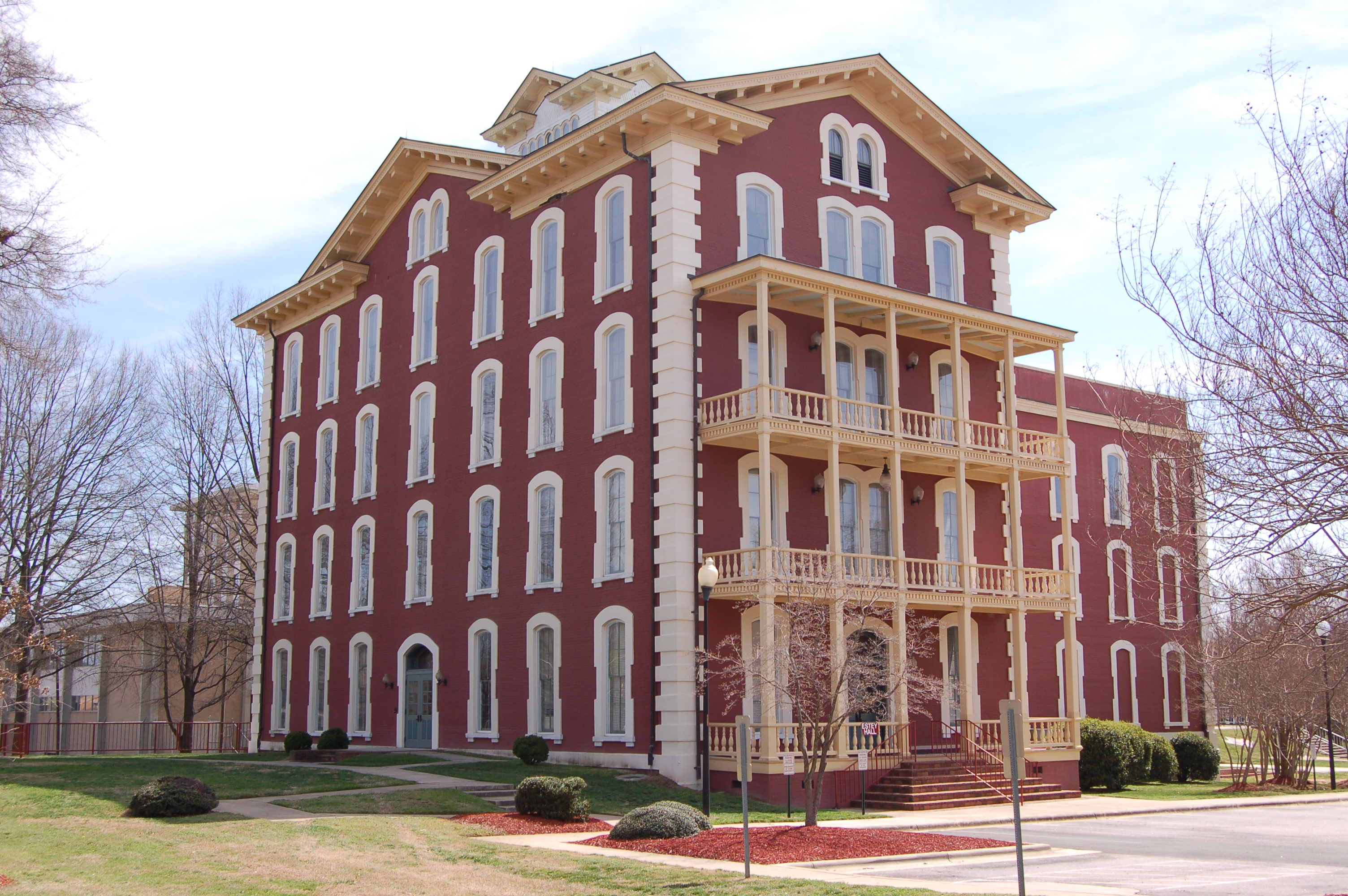
Estey Hall on the campus of Shaw University

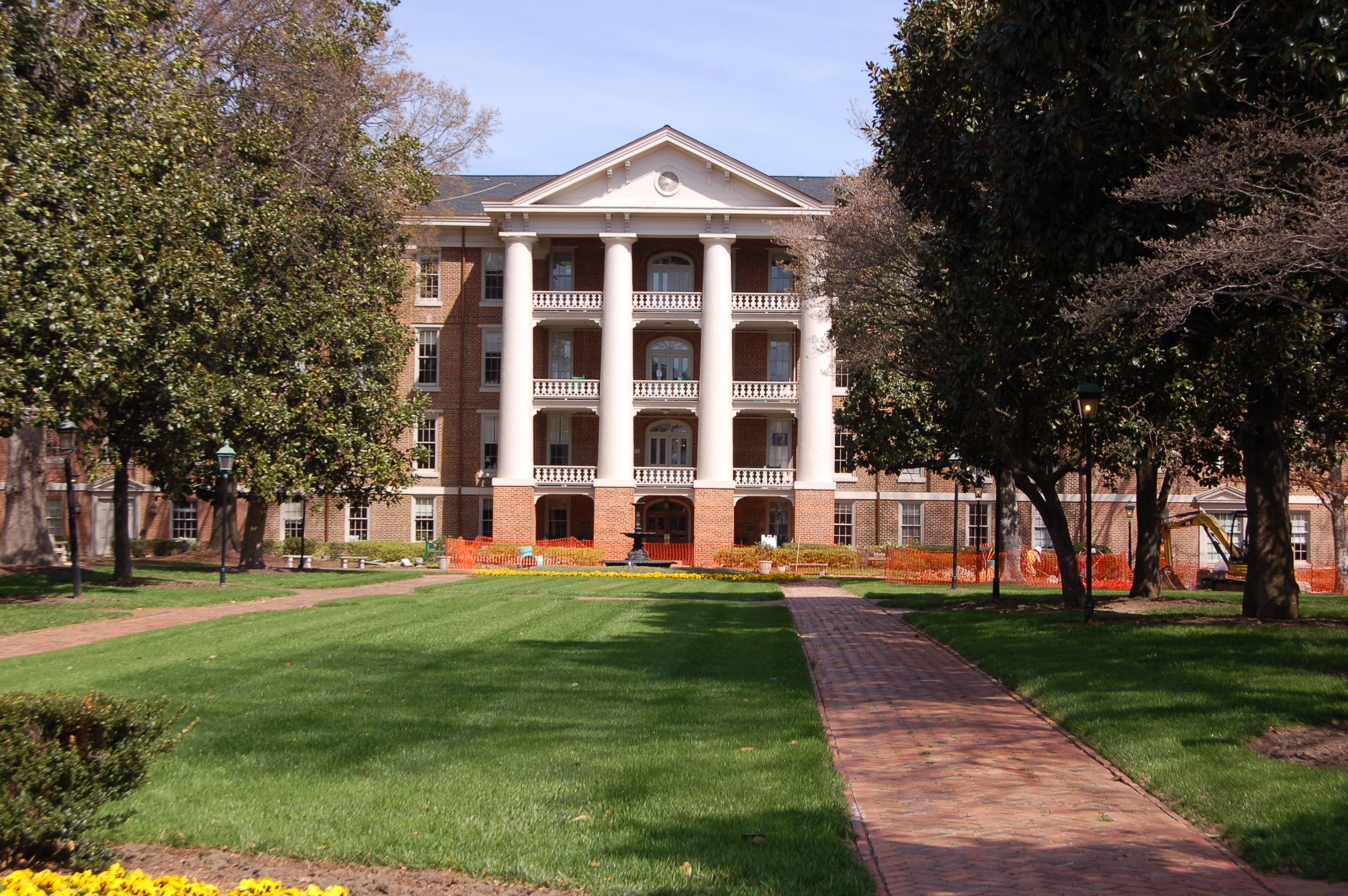
Main Building on the campus of William Peace University

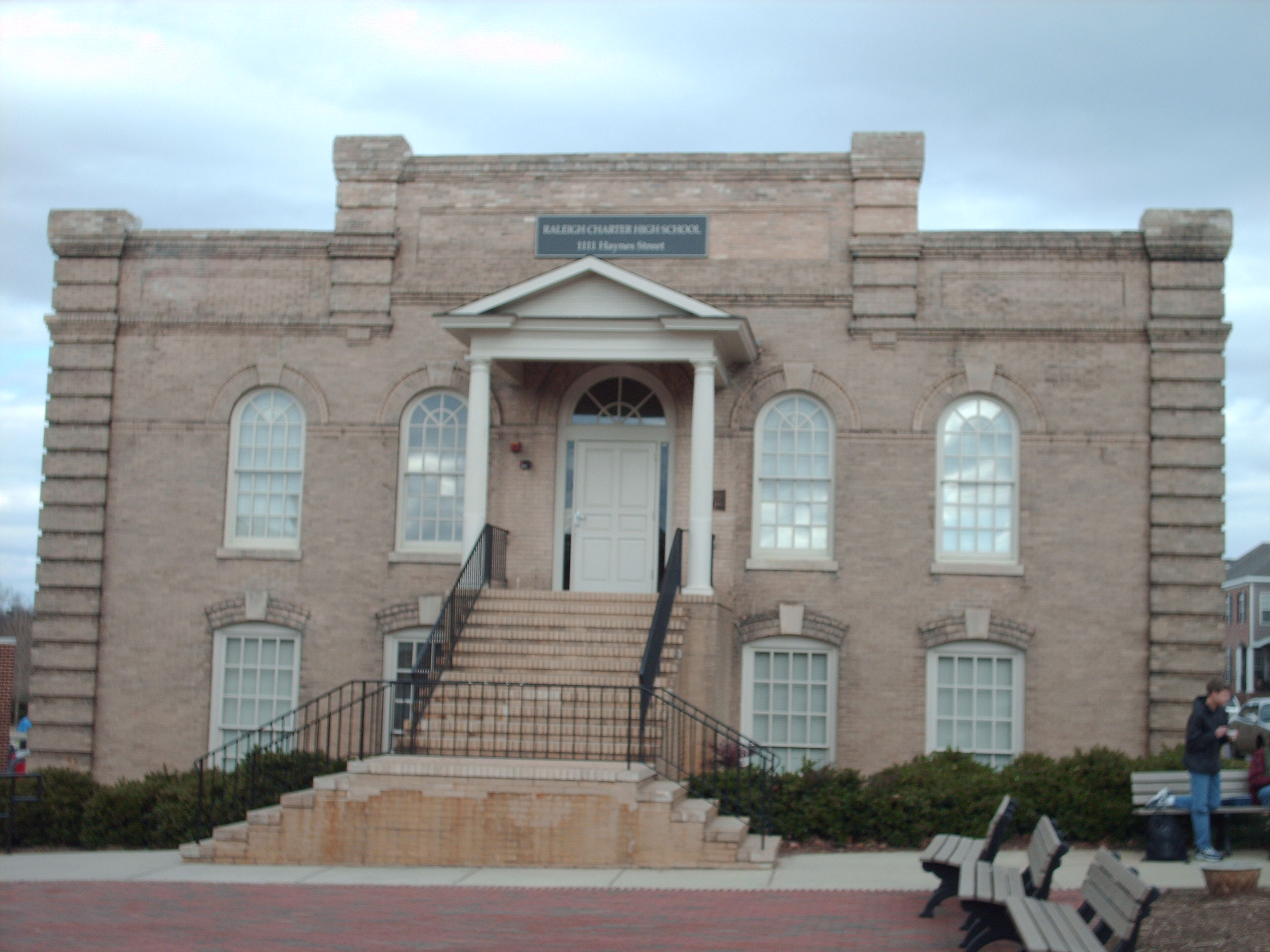
Raleigh Charter High School main entrance

=== Higher education ===
==== Public ====
- North Carolina State University
- Wake Technical Community College

==== Private ====
- Campbell University Norman Adrian Wiggins School of Law (Baptist)
- Meredith College (Baptist)
- Montreat College's School of Professional and Adult Studies (Presbyterian)
- William Peace University (Presbyterian)
- Shaw University (Baptist)
- Skema Business School, the first French Business School to open a campus in the US
- St. Augustine's University (Episcopal)

==== Private, for profit ====
- ECPI College of Technology
- The Medical Arts School
- Strayer University

=== Primary and secondary education ===
==== Public schools ====
Public schools in Raleigh are operated by the Wake County Public School System, the largest public school system of the Carolinas. Observers have praised the Wake County Public School System for its innovative efforts to maintain a socially, economically and racial balanced system by using income as a prime factor in assigning students to schools. Raleigh is home to several magnet high schools and several schools offering the International Baccalaureate program. There are four early college high schools in Raleigh. Raleigh also has two alternative high schools.

Wake County Public high schools in Raleigh include:

===== Traditional schools =====
- Needham B. Broughton High School (International Baccalaureate)
- Leesville Road High School
- Jesse O. Sanderson High School
- Wakefield High School

===== Magnet schools =====
- Athens Drive High School
- William G. Enloe GT/IB Center for the Humanities, Sciences, and the Arts (International Baccalaureate)
- Millbrook High School (International Baccalaureate)
- Southeast Raleigh Magnet High School

===== Alternative schools =====
- Longview School
- Mary E. Phillips High School

===== Early college schools =====
- Wake Young Men's Leadership Academy
- Wake Young Women's Leadership Academy
- Wake STEM Early College High School
- Wake Early College of Health and Sciences

==== Charter schools ====
The State of North Carolina provides for a legislated number of charter schools. These schools are administered independently of the Wake County Public School System. Raleigh is currently home to 11 such charter schools:

- Casa Esperanza Montessori School (K-8)
- Endeavor Charter School (K-8)
- Exploris Middle School (1–8)
- Hope Elementary School (K-5)
- Longleaf School of the Arts (9–12)
- Magellan Charter School (3–8)
- PreEminent Charter School (K-8)
- Quest Academy (K-8)
- Raleigh Charter High School (9–12)
- Torchlight Academy (K-6)
- Woods Charter School (K-12)

==== State-operated schools ====
- Governor Morehead School, school for the blind

==== Private and religion-based schools ====
- Al-Iman Islamic School (K-8)
- An Noor Quran Academy (3–8)
- Bonner Academy (5–8)
- Follow the Child Montessori School (K-6)
- Friendship Christian School of Raleigh (Baptist, 1–12)
- Gethsemane Seventh-day Adventist Church School (K-8)
- Grace Christian School (K-12)
- Jewish Academy of Wake County (K-3)
- Montessori School of Raleigh (K-9)
- Neuse Baptist Christian School (K-12)
- North Raleigh Christian Academy (Protestant Christian, K-12)
- Raleigh Christian Academy (Baptist, K-12)
- The Raleigh School (K-5)
- Ravenscroft School (K-12)
- The Trilogy School (2–12)
- Trinity Academy of Raleigh (Protestant Christian, K-12)
- Upper Room Christian Academy (closed) (PreK-12)
- Wake Christian Academy (K-12)
- Word of God Christian Academy (Protestant Christian, K-12)
- Thales Academy (PreK-12)

Episcopal schools

- St. David's School (Episcopal, K-12)
- St. Timothy's School (Episcopal, K-8)
- St. Mary's School (Episcopal, 9–12)

Catholic secondary schools

- Cardinal Gibbons High School (Catholic, 9–12)
- St. Thomas More Academy (Catholic, 6–12)

Catholic primary schools

- The Franciscan School (Catholic, K-8)
- Cathedral School (Catholic, PreK-8)
- Our Lady of Lourdes Catholic School (K-8)
- St. Raphael the Archangel Catholic School (PreK-8)

== Media ==
=== Print publications ===
There are several newspapers and periodicals serving Raleigh:

- The Daily State Chronicle, a former newspaper published from the 1880s to 1891.
- Carolina Journal, a free monthly newspaper
- The Carolinian, North Carolina's oldest and largest African-American newspaper published twice weekly
- Independent Weekly, a free weekly tabloid covering Raleigh, Durham, and the surrounding area
- Midtown Magazine an upscale Raleigh lifestyle magazine
- The News & Observer, a large daily newspaper owned by The McClatchy Company
- Raleigh Magazine a glossy print magazine covering exclusively Raleigh
- The Slammer, a paid bi-weekly newspaper featuring Raleigh crime news
- Technician, student publication of North Carolina State University
- The Triangle Downtowner Magazine, a locally owned free monthly print magazine centered around high-density areas of the Triangle with features on dining, entertainment, wine, community, history and more
- Walter Magazine a magazine covering the art, culture and people of Raleigh

=== Television ===
==== Broadcast ====
Raleigh is part of the Raleigh-Durham-Fayetteville Designated Market Area, the 24th largest broadcast television market in the United States. The following stations are licensed to Raleigh and/or have significant operations and viewers in the city:

- WUNC-TV (4, PBS): licensed to Chapel Hill, owned by the University of North Carolina
- WRAL-TV (5, NBC): licensed to Raleigh, owned by Capitol Broadcasting Company
- WAUG-LD (8, Independent station) licensed to Raleigh, owned and operated by Saint Augustine's College
- WTVD (11, ABC): licensed to Durham; news bureau located in Raleigh. ABC O&O owned by ABC Owned Television Stations
- WNCN-TV (17, CBS): studios located in Raleigh, licensed to the city of Goldsboro southeast of Raleigh; owned by Nexstar Media Group
- WLFL-TV (22, CW): licensed to Raleigh, owned by Sinclair Broadcast Group
- WRDC (28, MyNet) licensed to Durham, owned by Sinclair Broadcast Group
- WRAY-TV (30, TCT) licensed to Wilson. TCT O&O owned by Tri-State Christian Television
- WUVC-DT (40, Univision) licensed to Fayetteville. Univision O&O owned by TelevisaUnivision
- WRPX-TV (47, Ion) licensed to Rocky Mount, with studios in Raleigh. Ion O&O owned by Ion Media
- WRAZ-TV (50, Fox): licensed to Raleigh, owned by Capitol Broadcasting Company
- WRTD-CD (54, Telemundo): licensed to Raleigh. Telemundo O&O owned by NBCUniversal

=== Broadcast radio ===
==== Public and listener-supported ====
- WKNC-FM – 88.1 FM (College rock), operated by students of North Carolina State University
- WRKV – 88.9 FM (Contemporary Christian), operated by Educational Media Foundation
- WCPE-FM – 89.7 FM (Classical)
- WUNC-FM – 91.5 FM (National Public Radio, North Carolina Public Radio) operated by the University of North Carolina at Chapel Hill
- WRLY-LP – 93.5 FM (Adult hits), operated by Triangle Access Broadcasting, Inc.
- WKRP-LP – 101.9 FM (Variety), operated by Oak City Media, Inc.

==== Commercial ====
- WNCB-FM (93.9 B939 FM, Country)
- WQDR-FM (94.7QDR, Country)
- WDCG-HD2 (ALT 95.3, Throwback Hits, analog broadcast on 95.3 FM W237BZ)
- WBBB-FM 96.1 (Radio 96.1, Adult hits)
- WPLW-FM (96.9 Pulse FM, Contemporary hits)
- WQOK-FM (K97.5, Hip hop)
- WRDU-FM (100.7, Classic rock)
- WRAL-FM (Mix 101.5, Adult contemporary)
- WKIX-FM (KIX 102.9, Classic hits)
- WNNL-FM (103.9 The Light, Urban contemporary gospel)
- WDCG-FM (G105, Contemporary hit radio)
- WTKK-FM (106.1 FM, News/Talk)
- WFXC-FM/WFXK-FM (Foxy 107/104, Urban adult contemporary)
- WQDR-AM (570, classic rock)
- WPTF-AM (NewsRadio 680, News/Talk)
- 750 WAUG (Hot 97.9, Mainstream urban
- WKIX (Just Right Radio 850 and 93.5 FM, Popular standards)

== Infrastructure ==
=== Transportation ===
==== Air ====
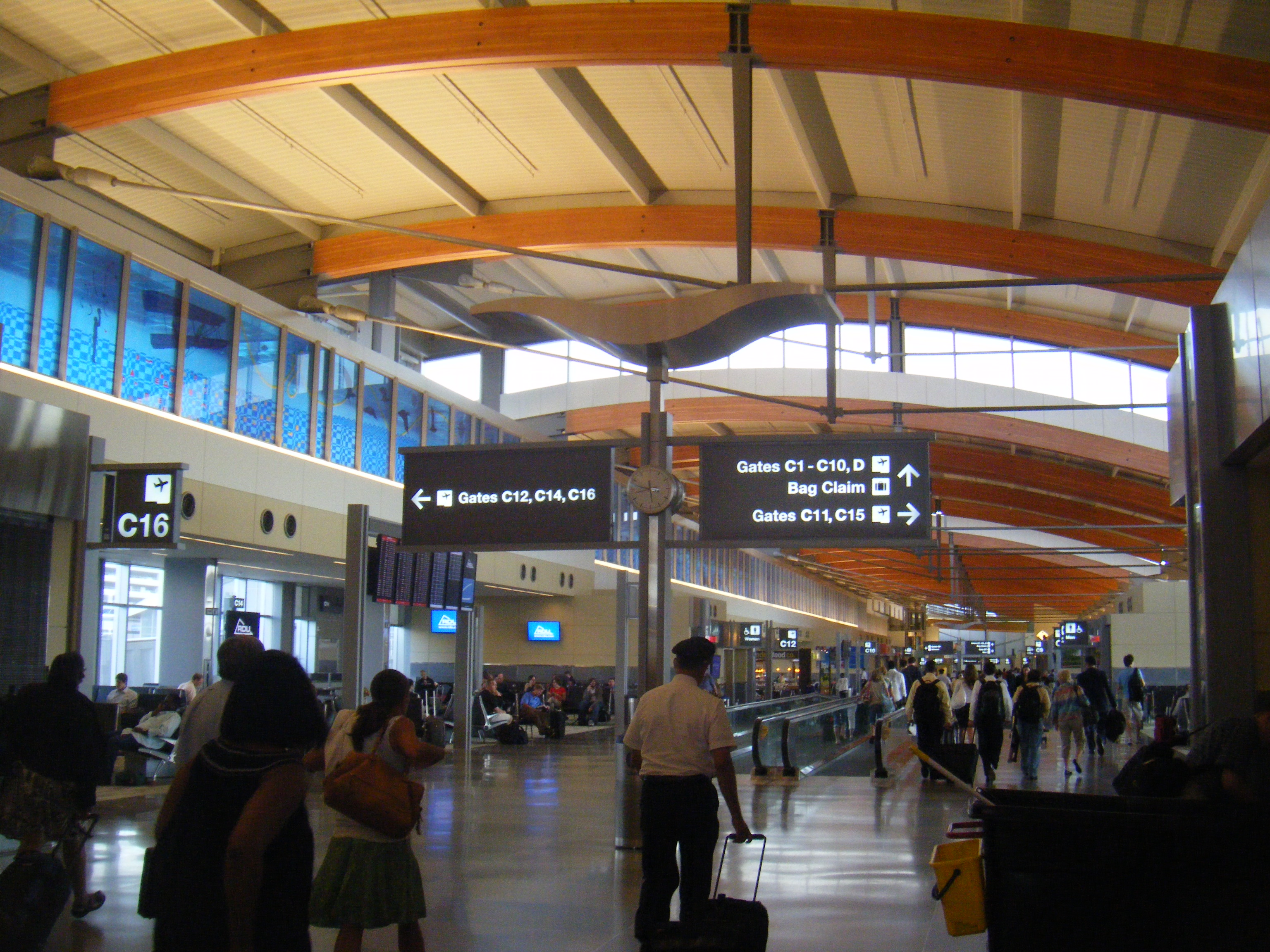
Raleigh–Durham International Airport

===== Raleigh-Durham International Airport =====
Raleigh-Durham International Airport (IATA: RDU, ICAO: KRDU, FAA LID: RDU), the region's primary airport and the second largest in North Carolina, located northwest of downtown Raleigh via Interstate-40 between Raleigh and Durham, serves the city and greater Research Triangle metropolitan region, as well as much of eastern North Carolina. The airport offers service to nearly 75 domestic and international destinations and serves approximately 15 million passengers a year. RDU is served by 16 air carriers, flying to a multitude of nonstop destinations on 350+ flights daily. The airport also offers facilities for cargo and general aviation. The airport authority tripled the size of its Terminal 2 (formerly Terminal C) in January 2011.

Private general aviation airports in Raleigh include Triple W Airport (ICAO: K5W5, FAA LID: 5W5).

==== Freeways and primary designated routes ====
===== Interstate Highways =====
- I-40
- I-87
- I-440
- I-540 / NC 540 Toll - partially completed.

===== United States Highways =====
- US 1
- US 64
- US 70
- US 264
- US 401

===== North Carolina Highways =====
- NC 50
- NC 54
- NC 98

==== Intercity rail ====
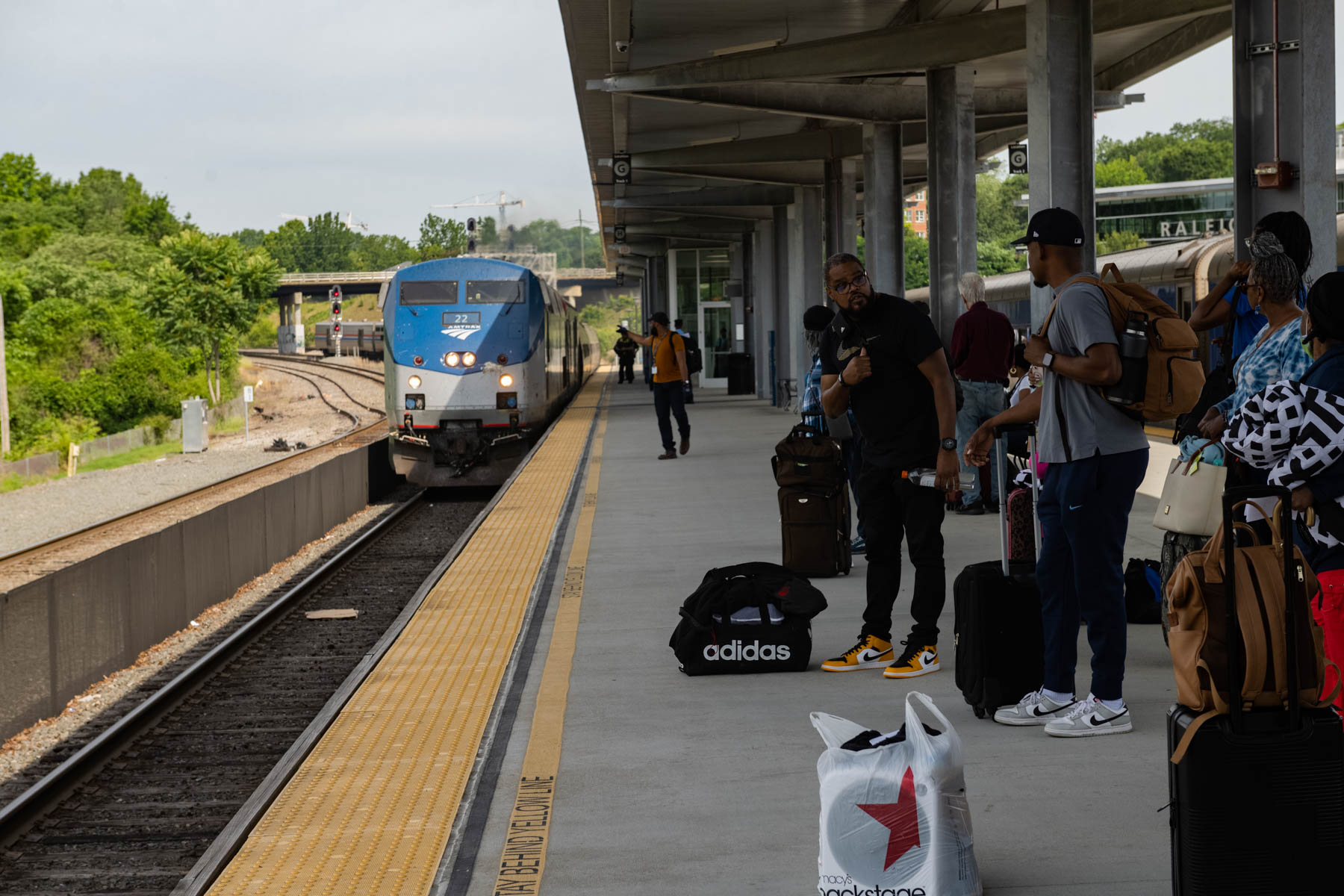
Amtrak Carolinian arriving at Raleigh Union Station

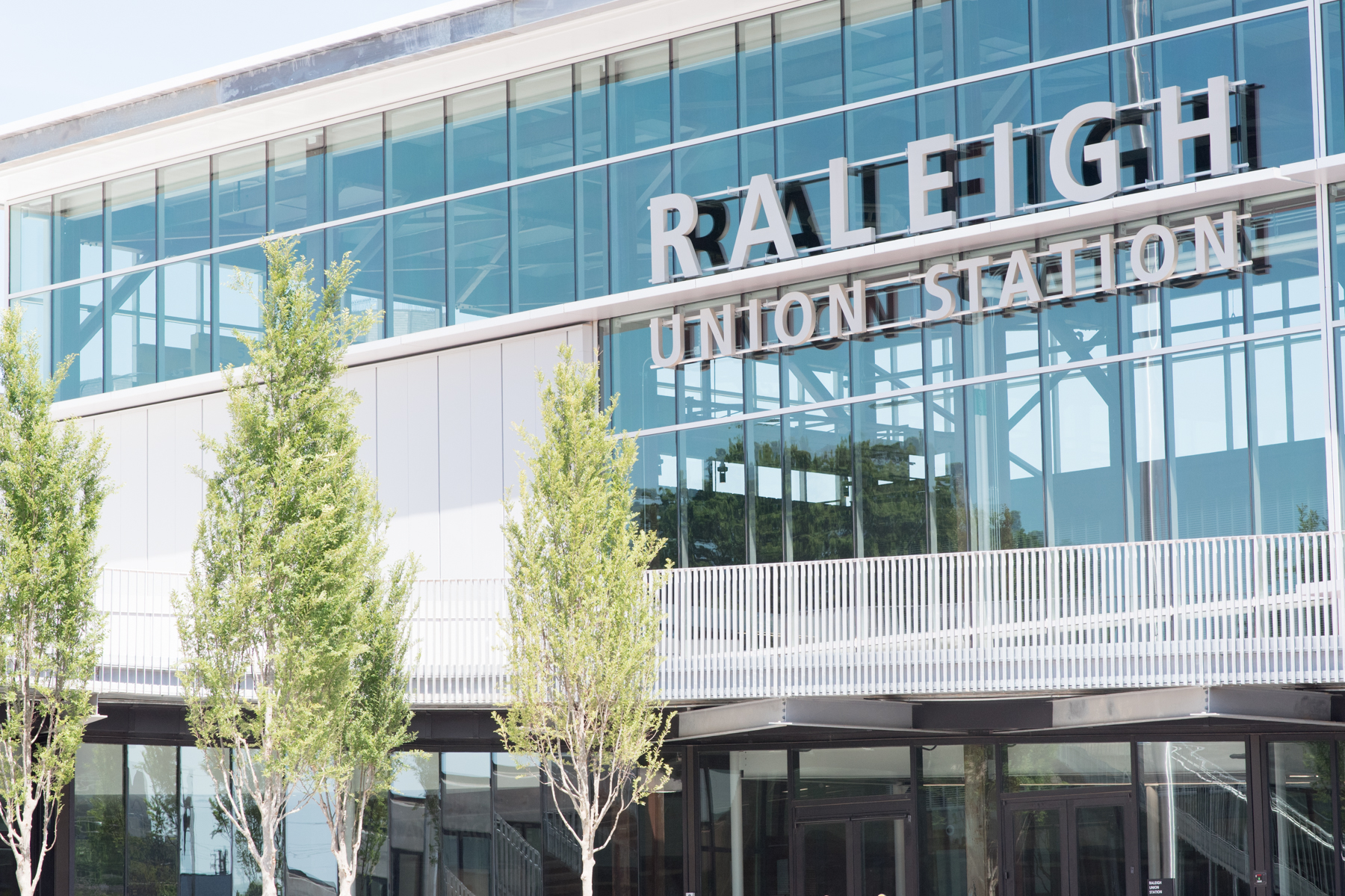
Raleigh Union Station

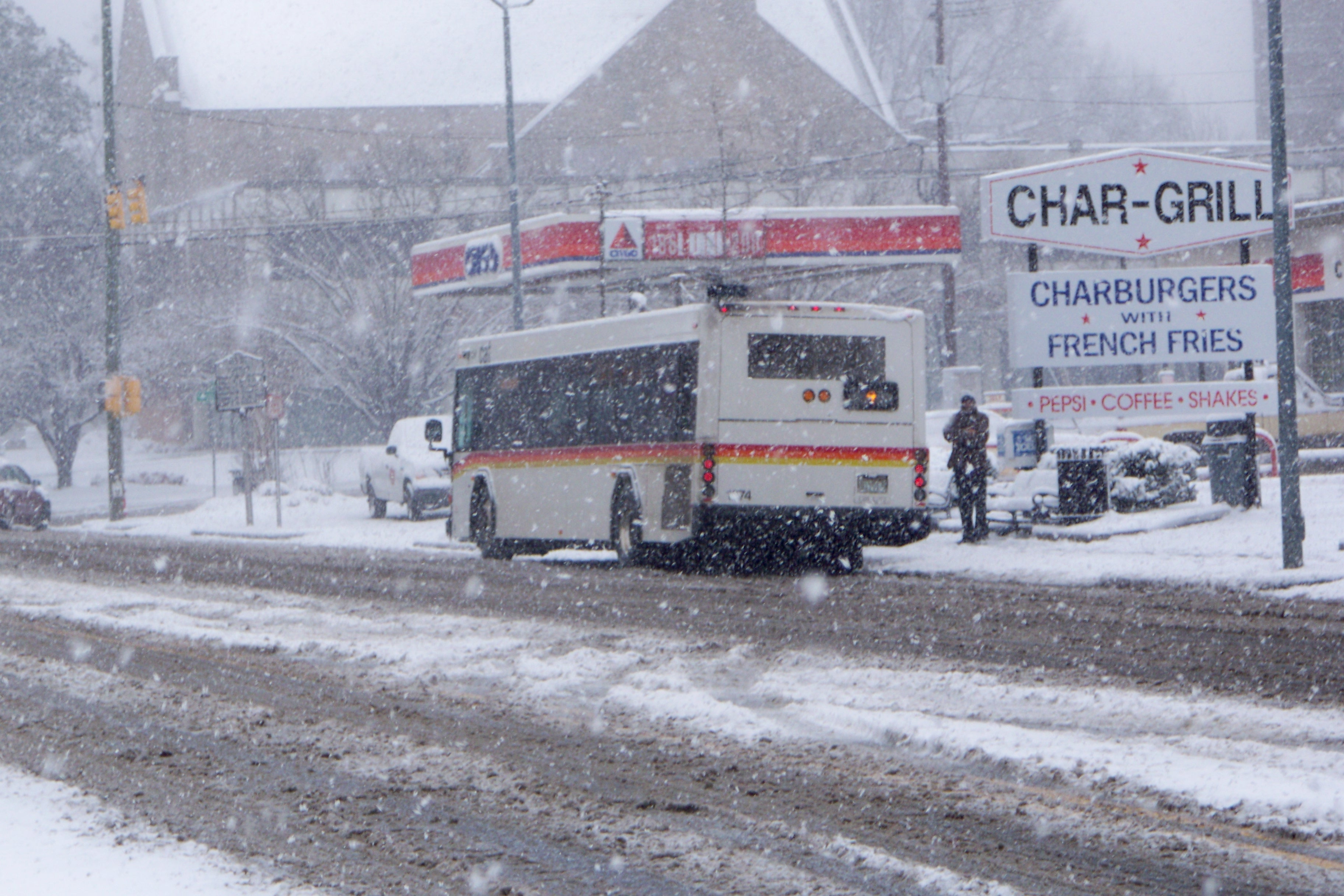
CAT bus on Hillsborough Street in Downtown Raleigh

Raleigh Union Station is one of Amtrak's busiest stops in the Southern U.S. The station is served by six passenger trains daily: the Floridian, four daily Piedmont trains, and the Carolinian. Daily service is offered between Raleigh and:

- Charlotte, with intermediate stops including Cary, Durham, Burlington and Greensboro, North Carolina.
- New York City, with intermediate stops including Richmond, VA; Washington, D.C.; Baltimore, MD; and Philadelphia, PA.
- Miami, with intermediate stops including Columbia, SC, and Savannah, GA; as well as Jacksonville, Orlando and Tampa, FL.
- Chicago, with intermediate stops including Pittsburgh, PA, Cleveland, OH, and Toledo, OH.

==== Public transit ====
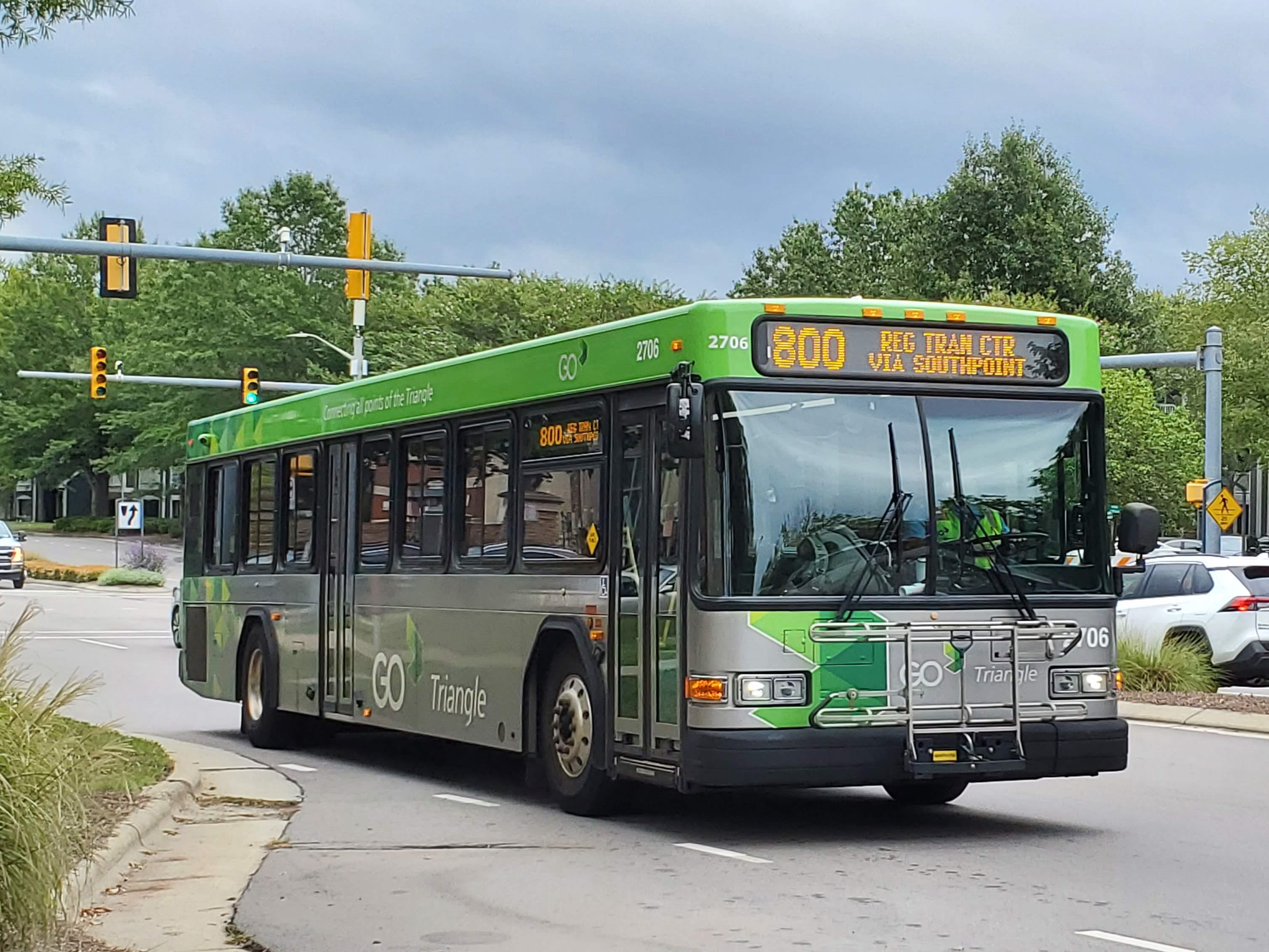
GoTriangle bus

Public transportation in and around Raleigh is provided by GoRaleigh (formerly Capital Area Transit), which operates 33 fixed bus routes, including the R-Line. Although there are 33 routes, some routes are designed to cover multiple other routes at times when they are not served. Depending on the time of the day, and the day of the week, the number of routes operating is between 5 and 29.

Raleigh is also served by GoTriangle (formerly Triangle Transit Authority). GoTriangle offers scheduled, fixed-route regional and commuter bus service between Raleigh and the region's other principal cities of Durham, Cary and Chapel Hill, as well as to and from the Raleigh-Durham International Airport, Research Triangle Park and several of the region's larger suburban communities. Triangle Transit also coordinates an extensive vanpool and rideshare program that serves the region's larger employers and commute destinations.

North Carolina State University also maintains its own transit system, the Wolfline, that provides zero-fare bus service to the general public along multiple routes serving the university's campuses in southwest Raleigh.

Government agencies throughout the Raleigh-Durham metropolitan area have struggled with determining the best means of providing fixed-rail transit service for the region.

From 1995 the cornerstone of Triangle Transit's long-term plan was a 28-mile rail corridor from northeast Raleigh, through downtown Raleigh, Cary, and Research Triangle Park, to Durham using DMU technology. There were proposals to extend this corridor 7 miles to Chapel Hill with light rail technology. However, in 2006 Triangle Transit deferred implementation indefinitely when the Federal Transit Administration declined to fund the program due to low ridership projections.

The region's two metropolitan planning organizations appointed a group of local citizens in 2007 to reexamine options for future transit development in light of Triangle Transit's problems. The Special Transit Advisory Commission (STAC) retained many of the provisions of Triangle Transit's original plan but recommended adding new bus services and raising additional revenues by adding a new local half-cent sales tax to fund the project.

Greyhound Lines provides an inter-city bus service to Durham, Charlotte, Richmond, Washington, D.C., Atlanta, and other cities.

==== Bicycle and pedestrian ====
- The Maine-to-Florida U.S. Bicycle Route#1 routes through suburban Raleigh, along with N.C. Bicycle Route #2, the "Mountains To Sea" route. As of September 2010, maps and signage for both US Bike Route No. 1 and NC Bike Route No. 2 are out-of-date for the Raleigh area. N.C. Bicycle Route #5 is routed nearby, connecting Apex to Wilmington and closely paralleling the NCBC Randonneurs 600-kilometer brevet route.
- Most public buses are equipped with bicycle racks, and some roads have dedicated bicycle-only lanes. Bicyclists and pedestrians also may use Raleigh's extensive greenway system, with paths and trails located throughout the city.
- In May 2011, Raleigh was designated a Bicycle Friendly Community by the League of American Bicyclists at the Bronze level.
- In 2002, the "Walk [Your City]" initiative was started in the city which provides a tool kit for neighborhood organizations to post signs giving a distance by bike or foot, with directions in scannable QR code. The movement has spread to more than 400 communities in 55 countries.

=== Public safety ===
The Raleigh Fire Department provides fire protection throughout the city. The North Carolina Correctional Institution for Women, the state's primary correctional facility housing female inmates, is based in Raleigh.

== Sister cities ==
Raleigh has several sister cities:

- Compiègne, Oise, Hauts-de-France, France
- Xiangyang, Hubei province, China
- Kingston upon Hull, England
- Rostock, Mecklenburg-Vorpommern, Germany
- Nairobi, Kenya
- Gibraltar, Gibraltar (overseas territory of the United Kingdom)

== See also ==
- List of capitals in the United States
- List of municipalities in North Carolina
- National Register of Historic Places listings in Wake County, North Carolina
- USS Raleigh, 4 ships
