= List of tallest buildings in Raleigh =

Skyline of Raleigh
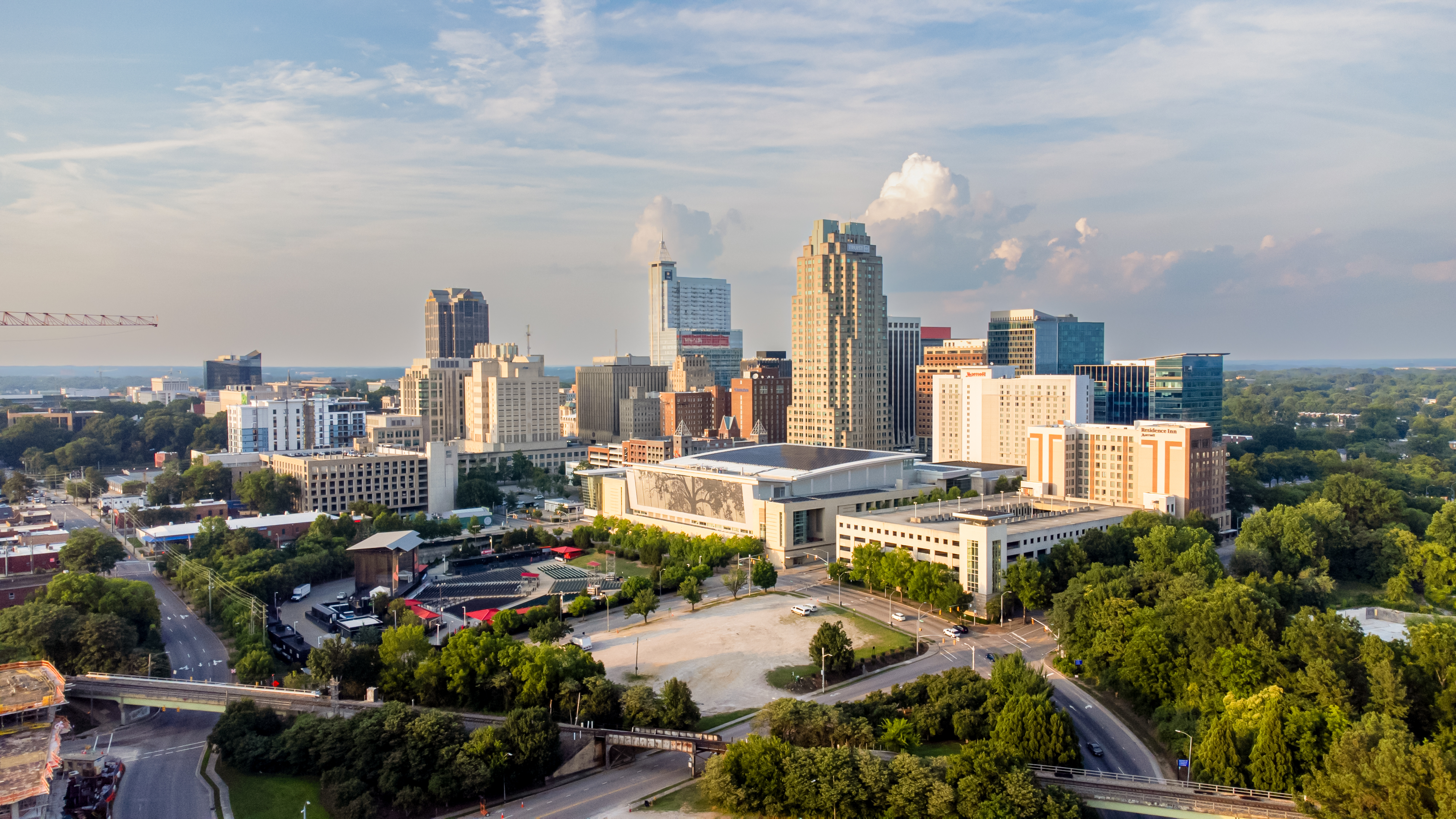
- Downtown Raleigh in 2023
- Tallest building: PNC Plaza
- Tallest building height: 538 ft (164 m)
- Major clusters: Downtown Raleigh; North Hills

Number of tall buildings
- 10 stories or more: 32
- 20 stories or more: 13
- Taller than 75 m (246 ft): 18
- Taller than 100 m (328 ft): 5
- Taller than 150 m (492 ft): 1

Raleigh, the second largest city in North Carolina, is home to more than 50 completed high-rise buildings, 14 of which stand taller than at least 250 feet (76 m). The tallest building in Raleigh is the 32-story PNC Plaza, which rises 538 feet (164 m) tall and was completed in 2008. It also stands as the tallest building in the state of North Carolina outside Charlotte. The second-tallest skyscraper in the city is Two Hannover Square, which rises 431 feet (131 m) and was completed in 1991. The Wells Fargo Capitol Center, completed in 1990, is Raleigh's third tallest building, rising at 400 feet (122 m). Overall, of the 25 tallest buildings in North Carolina, three are located in Raleigh. The history of skyscrapers in Raleigh began with the completion of the North Carolina State Capitol in 1840. The first skyscraper in the city is the Briggs Hardware Building, which was completed in 1874. Overall, the Council on Vertical Urbanism ranks Raleigh's skyline is the 46th largest in the United States, 63rd in North America, and 285th in the world.

== History ==
=== Historical skyline appearance ===
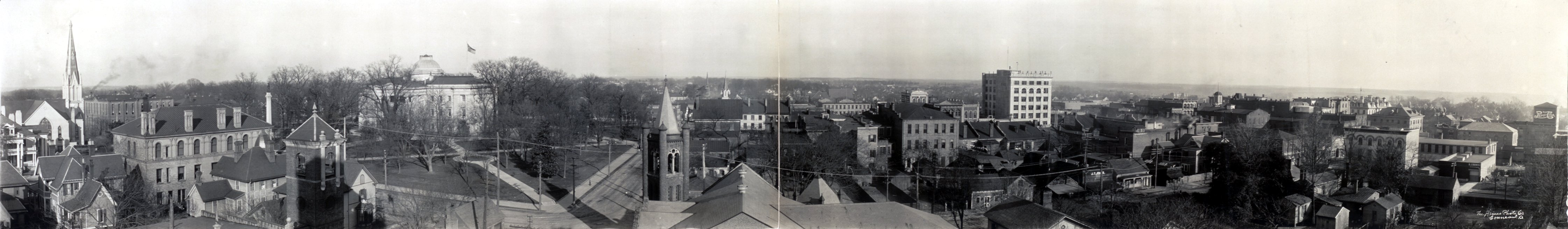
1909

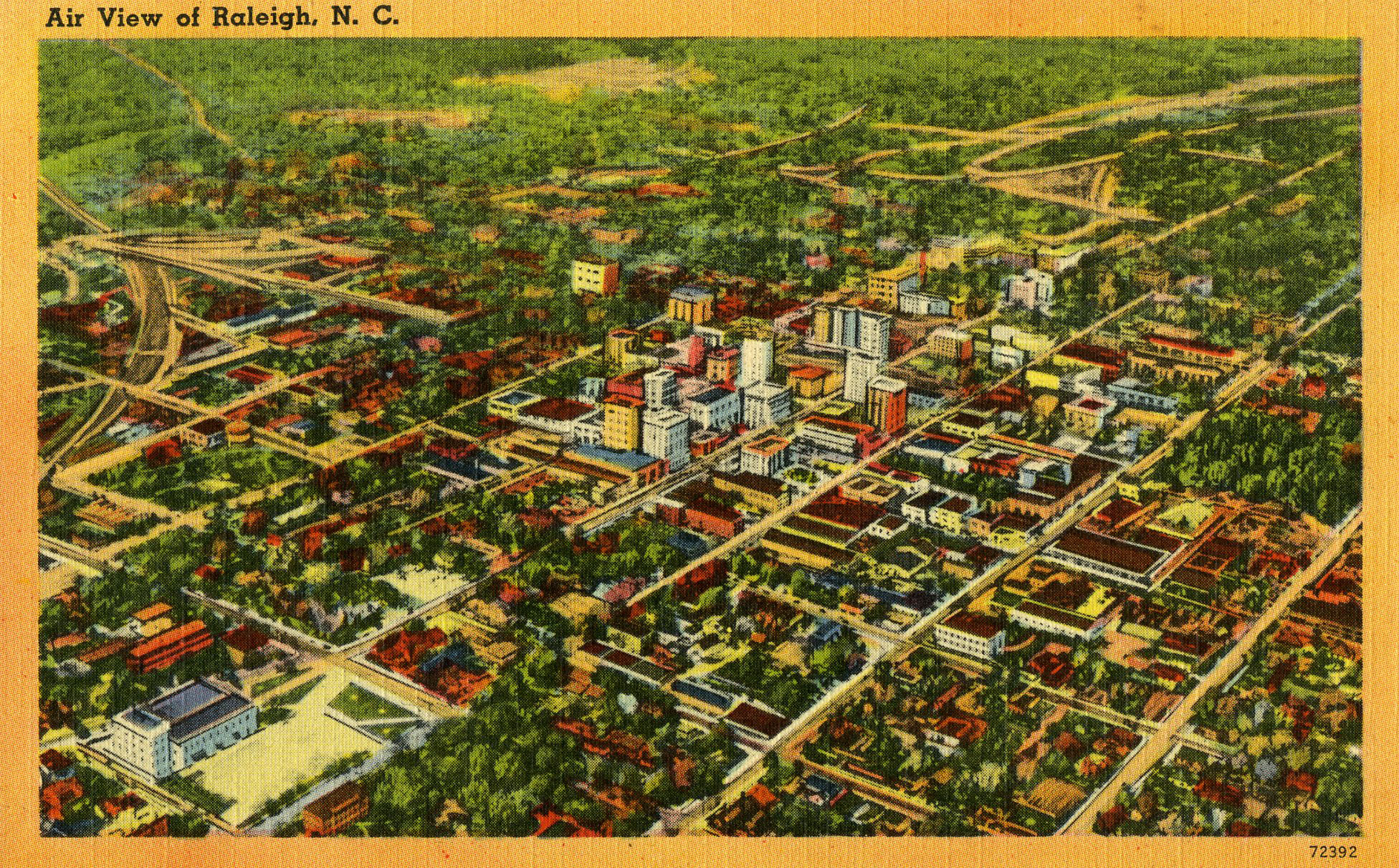
c. 1935

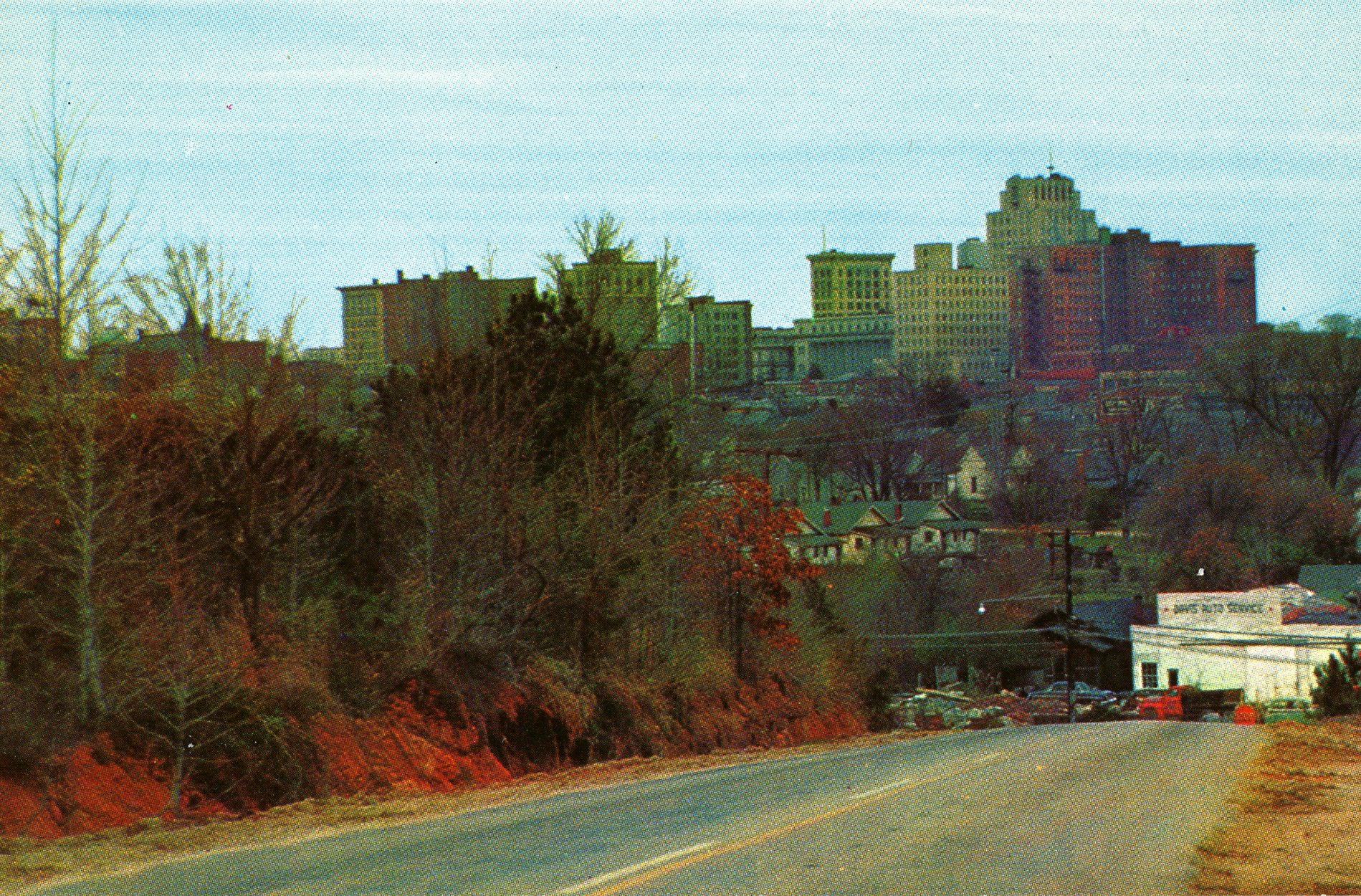
c. 1960

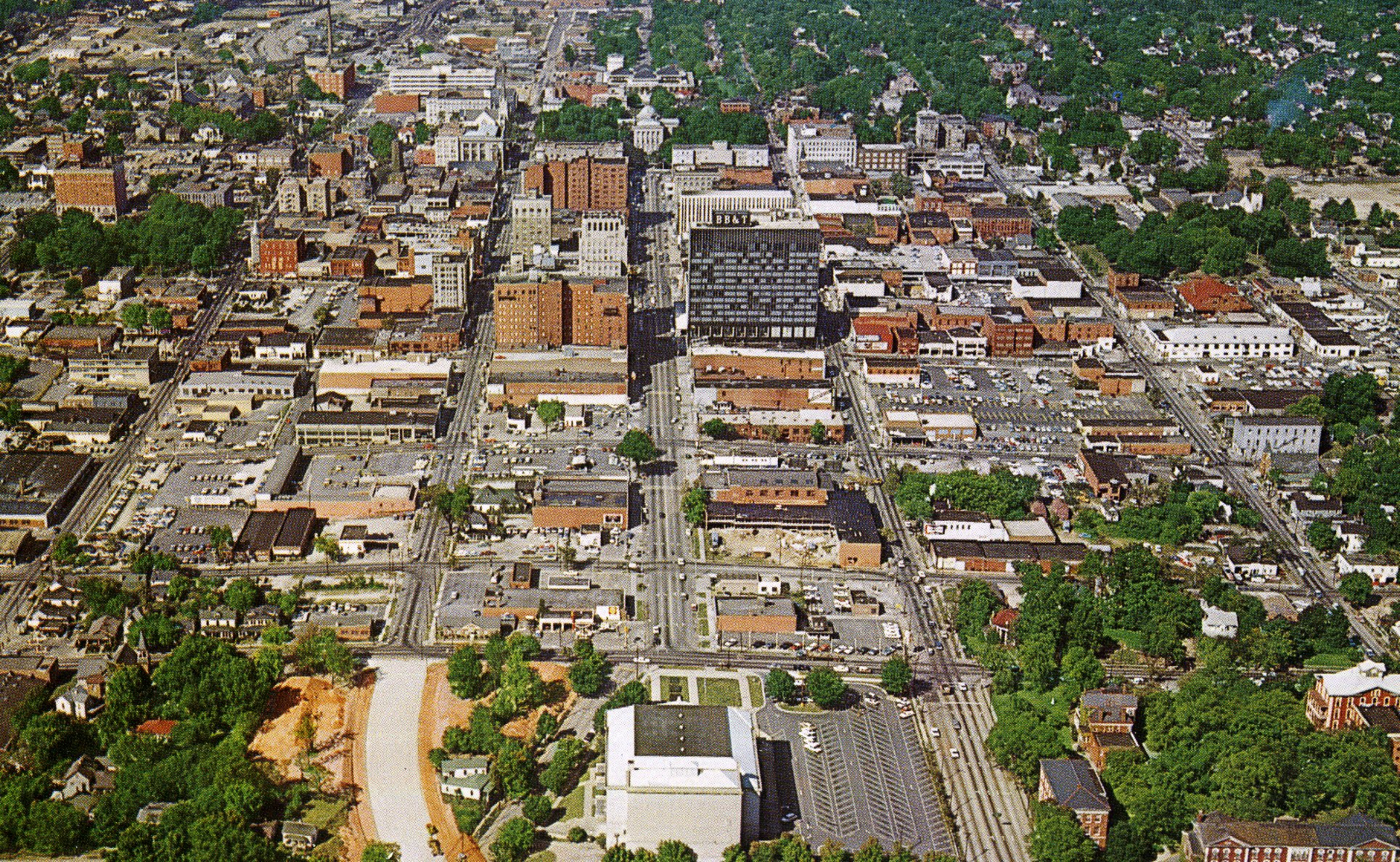
1966

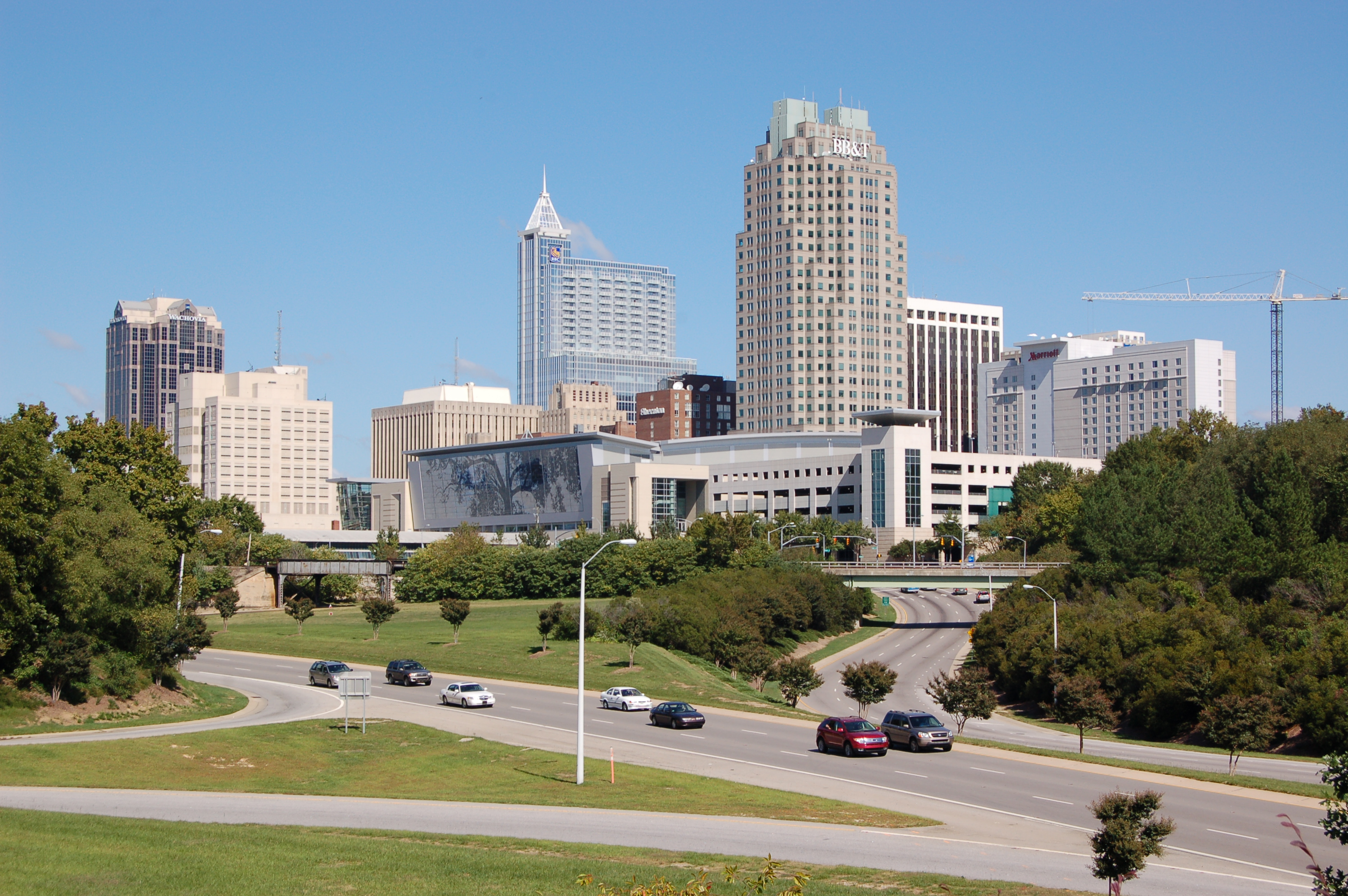
2008

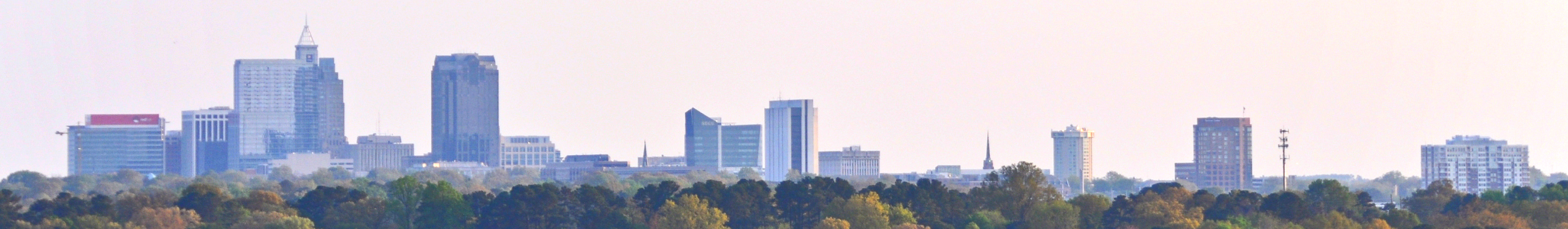
2018

=== 18th–20th century ===
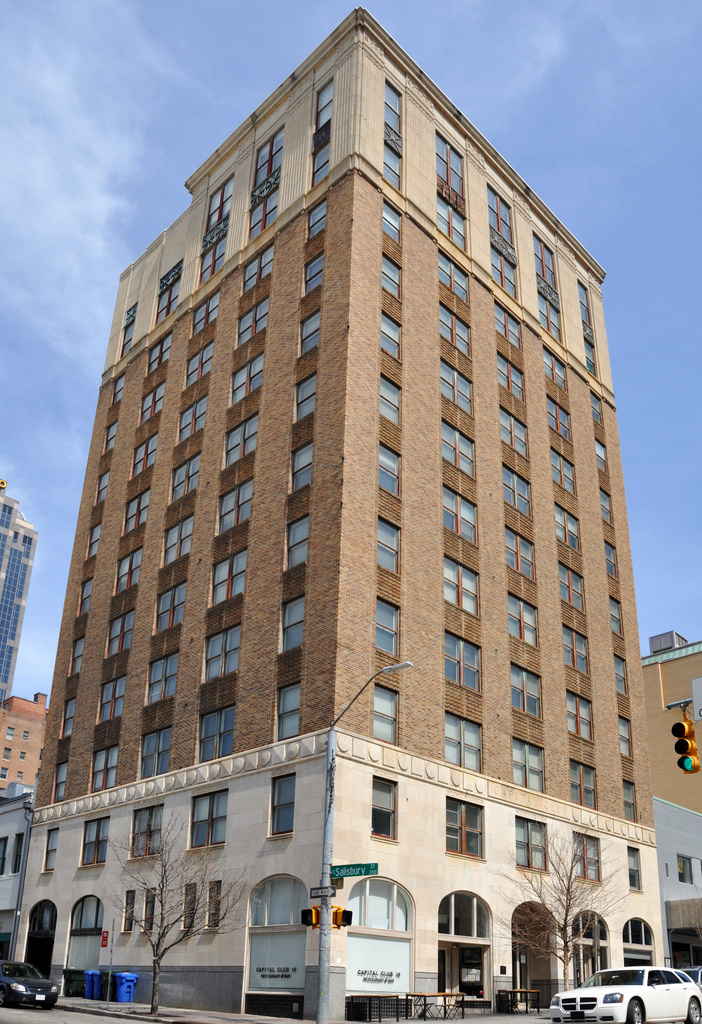
The 12-story Capital Club Building, built in 1929.

Raleigh was designed as a planned city in 1792 by William Christmas, which hampered the city's ability to house future skyscrapers. The first dwelling in the city & Wake County is the Joel Lane House, built in 1769. Other large buildings completed around that time include the North Carolina State House, which was finished in 1796. Raleigh's skyscraper history began in 1874 with the four story Briggs Hardware Building, becoming the first skyscraper in Raleigh. Edenton Street United Methodist Church later was completed in 1881. There was a building boom of 2-4 story buildings around Fayetteville Street in the early 20th century. The boom included Capital Apartments, Capital Club Building, Masonic Temple Building, and Odd Fellows Building.The Wake County Office Building was built in 1942, and became the tallest building, when Edenton Street United Methodist Church was destroyed by fire on July 28, 1956. The second construction boom occurred in the 1960s with multiple modernist buildings, including the Branch Banking and Trust Building. The 1990s had the completion of three of the tallest buildings in the city, with two being over 400 feet (122 m).

=== 2000s–present ===
In the 2000s, Red Hat Tower, Quorum Center, and PNC Plaza were built, with PNC Plaza being the first building over 500 feet (152 m). Soleil Center was planned 43-story skyscraper in 2005, which never materialized due to the Great Recession. In 2009, the Raleigh City Council passed a comprehensive plan, for construction outside of city center: Downtown, Brier Creek, Midtown, Crabtree Valley, West Raleigh, Cameron/University, Triangle Town Center, and New Bern/WakeMed. The first skyscrapers outside of the downtown area was built in North Hills. Renaissance Raleigh Hotel opened in 2008 and Captrust Tower in 2009. Other buildings completed in the late 2010-2020s include Bank of America Tower, Park Central, Midtown Plaza, Advance Auto Parts Tower, The Eastern, The Tower at Cardinal North Hills, NHX North Tower Apartments, One North Hills Tower, and North Hills Tower 5. Skyhouse Raleigh completed in 2015, making it the tallest residential skyscraper. The Dillon became the tallest structure in the Warehouse District in 2018.

Highline Glenwood in Glenwood South will be the second tallest building and Omni Raleigh will be the fifth tallest building once they are completed.

=== Tallest buildings ===
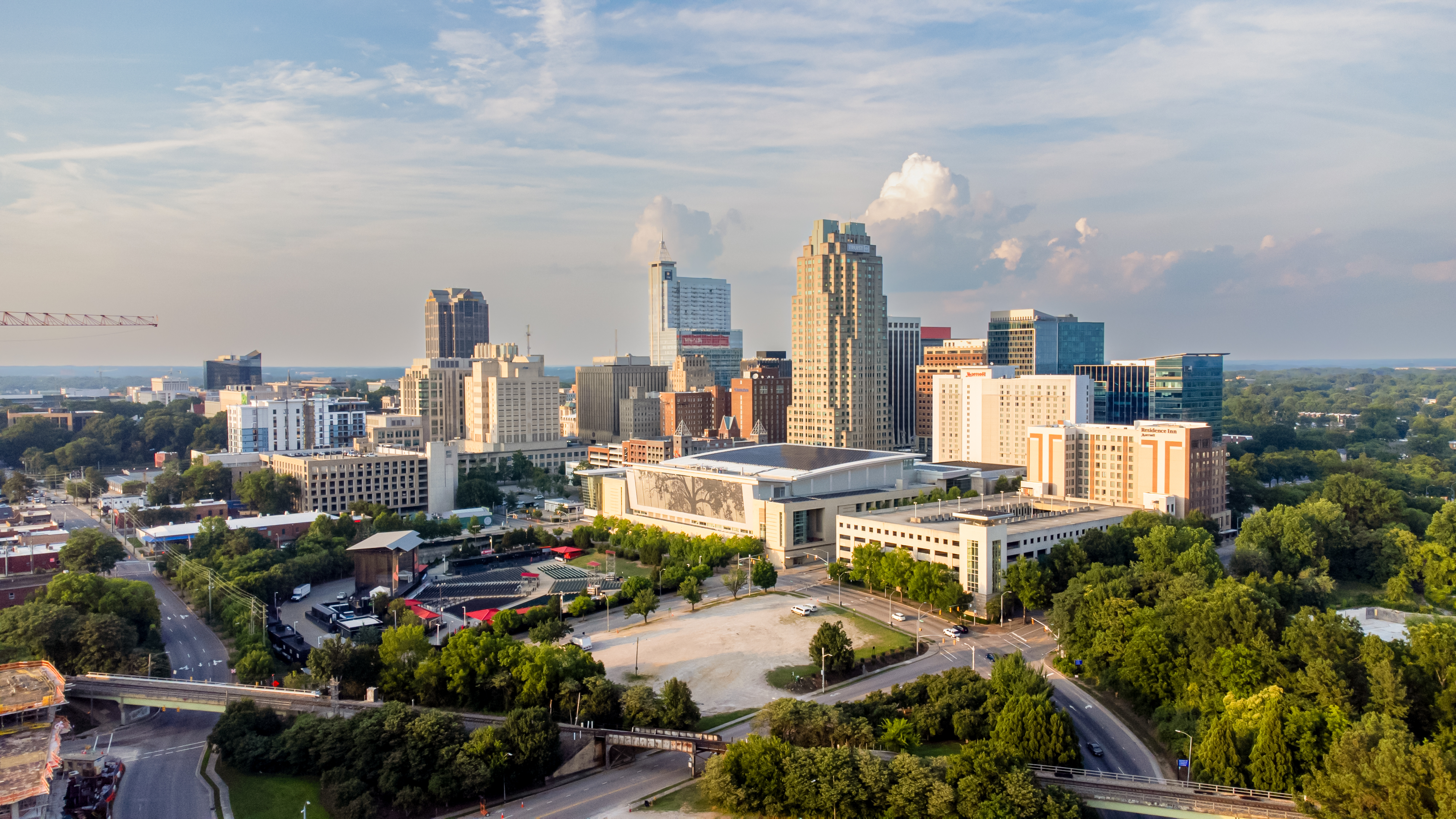
Downtown in 2023

There have been several buildings in Raleigh that have held the title as the tallest building in the city. While the 3-story North Carolina State Capitol was the first high-rise building in the city, the Briggs Hardware Building is generally regarded as Raleigh's first skyscraper, when it was completed in 1874. The Edenton Street United Methodist Church was completed in 1881 and held the title as the tallest building in Raleigh for 75 years until it was destroyed by fire in 1956, for which the Wake County Office Building became the tallest building. Capital Bank Plaza became the tallest building in 1964, until the completion of the State Capitol Holiday Inn (Note: Original building name for Holiday Inn Raleigh Downtown.) in 1969. In 1977, One Progress Plaza overtook the Holiday Inn as the tallest in the city. First Union Capitol Center is the first building over 400 feet (122 m) in 1990. Two Hannover Square quickly became the tallest building in 1991. In 2008, RBC Plaza became the first building over 500 feet (152 m).

Number of buildings by height in Raleigh by the end of each year, based on the information in this article. Click on the legend to toggle a specific height on or off. View chart definition.

== Map of tallest buildings ==
The map below shows the location of buildings taller than 200 ft (61 m) in Raleigh, most of which are in the city's Central Business District and North Hills. Each marker is numbered by the building's height rank, and colored by the decade of its completion.

Buildings taller than 200 feet (61 m) in Raleigh. Each marker is numbered by height and colored by the decade of the building's completion. An asterisk (*) next to the building's name indicates it is located outside the map.
- 1950s and before
- 1960s
- 1970s
- 1980s
- 1990s
- 2000s
- 2010s
- 2020s
1 PNC Plaza
2 Two Hannover Square
3 150 Fayetteville
4 The Eastern
5 FNB Tower
6 One Progress Plaza
7 One City Plaza
8 Red Hat Tower
9 301 Hillsborough
10 Bank of America Tower
11 The Dillon
12 The Holston at The Weld
13 Ray at The Weld
14 Skyhouse Raleigh
15 Captrust Tower
16 Wake County Justice Center
17 East Civic Tower
18 Advance Auto Parts Tower
19 400H Apartments
20 Wake County Public Safety Center
21 Cardinal North Hills - East Tower
22 Holiday Inn Raleigh Downtown
23 North Hills Tower 5
24 333 Fayetteville Street
25 The Strand
26 Sheraton Capital Center
27 Charter Square
28 The Maeve
29 Park Central
30 West Condominiums
31 Wake County Office Building
32 Raleigh Marriott City Center
33 Quorum Center

== Tallest buildings ==
This list ranks Raleigh high rises 200 feet (61 m), based on standard height measurement. This includes spires and architectural details but does not include antenna masts. The "Year" column indicates the year in which a buildings was completed. Buildings tied in height are sorted by year of completion with earlier buildings ranked first, and then alphabetically.

Was the tallest building in Raleigh upon completion
Architecturally topped out but not yet completed

Rank	Name	Image	Location	Height ft (m)	Floors	Year	Primary Purpose	Notes
1	PNC Plaza		Downtown — Fayetteville Street 35°46′37.0″N 78°38′19.4″W	538 feet (164 m)	32	2008	Office/ Residential	Previously known as RBC Plaza. Was the U.S. headquarters of RBC Bank. Tallest building in North Carolina outside of Charlotte. Tallest building completed in Raleigh in the 2000s.
2	Two Hannover Square		Downtown — Fayetteville Street 35°46′28.4″N 78°38′24.5″W	431 feet (131 m)	29	1991	Office	Formerly known as BB&T Building. Was the tallest building in Raleigh before being surpassed by PNC Plaza. Tallest building completed in Raleigh in the 1990s.
3	150 Fayetteville		Downtown — Fayetteville Street 35°46′27.6″N 78°38′24.6″W	400 feet (122 m)	30	1990	Office	Formerly known as First Union Capitol Center, Wachovia Capitol Center and Wells Fargo Capitol Center. Was the tallest building in Raleigh before being surpassed by Two Hannover Square.
4	The Eastern		North Hills 35°50′10.3″N 78°38′23.4″W	377 feet (115 m)	36	2022	Residential	Formerly known as Walter Tower. Tallest building completed in Raleigh in the 2020s.
5	FNB Tower		Downtown — Fayetteville Street 35°46′25.9″N 78°38′21.3″W	358 feet (109 m)	22	2019	Office/ Residential	Formerly known as Charter Square North. Regional headquarters of First National Bank. Tallest building completed in Raleigh in the 2010s.
6	One Progress Plaza		Downtown — Fayetteville Street 35°46′37.5″N 78°38′20.2″W	298 feet (91 m)	21	1977	Office	Formerly known as Progress Energy Building, CP&L Building, Carolina Power & Light Building, Center Plaza Was the tallest building in Raleigh before being surpassed by 150 Fayetteville. Tallest building completed in Raleigh in the 1970s.
7	One City Plaza		Downtown — Fayetteville Street 35°46′28.5″N 78°38′19.7″W	289 feet (88 m)	17	1985	Office	Formerly known as One Bank of America Plaza, One Hannover Square. Tallest building completed in Raleigh in the 1980s.
8	Red Hat Tower		Downtown — Moore Square 35°46′29.3″N 78°38′16.4″W	286 feet (87 m)	19	2004	Office	Formerly known as Two Progress Tower, Progress Energy Tower. Previously the headquarters of Progress Energy; is now the headquarters of Red Hat.
9	301 Hillsborough		Downtown — Glenwood South 35°46′48.6″N 78°38′38.2″W	272 feet (83 m)	19	2022	Office	Phase 1 of the Raleigh Crossing development. Headquarters of Pendo.
10	Bank of America Tower		North Hills 35°50′17.7″N 78°38′26.0″W	266 feet (81 m)	18	2016	Office	Bank of America, Merrill Lynch and U.S. Trust moved their operations to the building.
11	The Dillon	The Dillon, 2017	Downtown — Warehouse District 35°46′42.4″N 78°38′43.3″W	266 feet (81 m)	17	2018	Office/ Residential	The building was built on the 2.5-acre occupies the former Dillon Supply warehouse.
12	The Holston at The Weld		Downtown 35°46′01″N 78°39′00″W	265 feet (81 m)	20	2025	Residential	Two tower developments near Dix Park.
13	Ray at The Weld		Downtown 35°46′04″N 78°39′02″W	265 feet (81 m)	20	2025	Residential	Two tower developments near Dix Park.
14	Skyhouse Raleigh	SkyHouse Raleigh looking east during sunrise	Downtown — Moore Square 35°46′36.9″N 78°38′13.4″W	264 feet (80 m)	23	2015	Residential	Upon its completion in 2015, it became the tallest apartment building in Raleigh.
15	Captrust Tower		North Hills 35°50′13.6″N 78°38′23.5″W	260 feet (79 m)	17	2009	Office	
16	Wake County Justice Center		Downtown — Fayetteville Street 35°46′36″N 78°38′28″W	258 feet (79 m)	12	2013	Office	
17	East Civic Tower		Downtown — Fayetteville Street 35°46′43.3″N 78°38′32.5″W	258 feet (79 m)	17	2026	Office	Topped out on November 7, 2025. It will be a city hall complex in downtown, which will consolidate most of the city functions into one building. The building is located at 110 S McDowell St, the former Raleigh Police Department headquarters.
18	Advance Auto Parts Tower		North Hills 35°50′10.4″N 78°38′23.8″W	257 feet (78 m)	20	2020	Office	Headquarters for Advance Auto Parts.
19	400H		Downtown — Glenwood South 35°46′52″N 78°38′42″W	244 feet (74 m)	20	2023	Office/ Residential	
20	Wake County Public Safety Center		Downtown — Fayetteville Street 35°46′34.3″N 78°38′26.1″W	241 feet (73 m)	17	1991	Office	
21	Cardinal North Hills - East Tower		North Hills 35°50′09″N 78°38′09″W	241 feet (73 m)	18	2023	Residential	Located in the North Hills area.
22	Holiday Inn Raleigh Downtown		Downtown — Glenwood South 35°46′52″N 78°38′39″W	239 feet (73 m)	20	1969	Hotel	Formerly known as Clarion Hotel. Future conversion to Hotel Indigo. Raleigh Historic Landmark. Tallest building completed in Raleigh in the 1960s.
23	North Hills Tower 5		North Hills 35°50′02″N 78°37′50″W	238 feet (73 m)	18	2025	Office	Located in the North Hills Innovation District.
24	333 Fayetteville Street		Downtown — Fayetteville Street 35°46′34.3″N 78°38′26.1″W	221 feet (67 m)	15	1964	Office	Formerly known as 333 Corporate Plaza, Capital Bank Plaza Was the tallest building in Raleigh before being surpassed by One Progress Plaza.
25	The Strand		North Hills 35.83548°N 78.63755°W	215 feet (66 m)	20	2027	Mixed-Use	A 20-story residential tower with have 362 apartments and 9,000 square feet (840 m^{2}) of ground-level retail. Topped out September 23, 2026.
26	Sheraton Capital Center		Downtown — Fayetteville Street 35°46′30.6″N 78°38′23.9″W	213 feet (65 m)	17	1982	Hotel	
27	Charter Square		Downtown — Fayetteville Street 35°46′24.5″N 78°38′20.0″W	213 feet (65 m)	11	2015	Office	Platinum LEED certified.
28	The Maeve		Downtown — Warehouse District 35°46′23″N 78°38′40″W	213 feet (65 m)	20	2025	Residential	
29	Park Central		North Hills 35°50′10″N 78°38′15″W	212 feet (65 m)	16	2017	Residential	
30	West Condominiums		Downtown — Glenwood South 35°47′06.4″N 78°38′42.9″W	211 feet (64 m)	15	2008	Residential	(Note: Sources do not state the exact height of this building. This figure was determined using Google Earth by subtracting the altitude of the building's lowest main pedestrian open-air entrance from the highest architectural point.)
31	Wake County Office Building		Downtown — Glenwood South 35°46′57.9″N 78°38′41.0″W	206 feet (63 m)	15	1942	Office	Was the tallest building in Raleigh before being surpassed by 333 Fayetteville Street. Tallest building completed in Raleigh in the 1940s.
32	Raleigh Marriott City Center		Downtown — Fayetteville Street 35°46′25.0″N 78°38′23.9″W	202 feet (62 m)	17	2008	Hotel	
33	Quorum Center		Downtown — Glenwood South 35°46′57.9″N 78°38′41.0″W	200 feet (61 m)	15	2007	Office/ Residential	Building received damage from the Metropolitan apartment complex fire on March 16, 2017.

== Tallest under construction or proposed ==
=== Under construction ===
Buildings approved that are currently under construction, in site prep, or demolition phase. Buildings listed are planned to rise above 200 feet (60 m) and include:

Name	Image	Height (ft.)/(m.)	Floors	Year	Status	Primary Purpose	Notes
Highline Glenwood		403 feet (123 m)	37	2028	Under construction	Mixed-Use	Initially planned to rise to 32 stories, but modified in 2022. The building experienced permit delays in 2023 and broke ground in October 2025. It will have 306 Residential units, and it will be the first phase of Highline Glenwood. The developer Turnbridge Equities, has secured financing for the project. Once complete, it is expected to be the tallest residential building in the city.
Omni Raleigh		362 feet (110 m)	29	2028	Under construction	Mixed-Use	It is a 29-story hotel containing 600 rooms and 20,000 square feet (1,900 m^{2}) of retail. The site is located on former surface parking directly across the street from the Martin Marietta Center for the Performing Arts in downtown Raleigh. It broke ground in February 2026 and it will deliver near the end of 2028
Union West		?	23	2026	Under construction	Mixed-Use	Initial planned for two towers, 32-stories. Now a single, 23-story building.
Life Time Living Raleigh		225 feet (69 m)	20	2028	Under construction	Mixed-Use	Groundbreaking October 29, 2026. It is a 20-story building containing a 80,000 square feet (7,400 m^{2}) Life Time Fitness location, 289 apartment units, and a 40,000 square feet (3,700 m^{2}) rooftop beach club. Construction will start in early 2026.

=== Proposed ===
Buildings currently planned, approved or on hold. Buildings listed are planned to rise above 200 feet (60 m) and include:

Name	Height (ft.)/(m.)	Floors	Year	Status	Primary Purpose	Notes
Wilmington Street Mixed Use	242 feet (74 m)	20	TBD	Proposed	Mixed-Use	Located at 521 S Wilmington Street.
404 Glenwood at The Creamery	295 feet (90 m)	20	TBD	Approved	Mixed-Use	Second phase of Highline Glenwood. Located in Glenwood South.
The Nash (Tower 1)	–	40	TBD	On Hold	Mixed-Use	First of two planned towers located next to Nash Square in Downtown Raleigh. Would be Tallest Building in Raleigh if constructed.
The Nash (Tower 2)	–	40	TBD	On Hold	Mixed-Use	Second of two planned towers located next to Nash Square in Downtown Raleigh. Would be Tallest Building in Raleigh if constructed.
Raleigh Convention Hotel and Downtown Development Project (Tower 2)	530 feet (162 m)	40	TBD	On Hold	Office/Mixed-Use	Planned to be constructed near Raleigh's convention center and performing arts center. While the height has not been revealed, the city desires for both buildings to be of a substantial height.
One Nash Square	–	20	2029	Approved	Residential	Located at 217 W. Martin St. Planned condominium. Initially plan for a 36-story mixed-use tower.
Vela LongView	336 feet (102 m)	30	TBD	On Hold	Mixed-Use	Will have 524,568 Sq Ft for residential units and retail spaces. To begin construction in mid-2023.
Bloc83 Tower 3	274 feet (84 m)	18	TBD	On Hold	Mixed-Use	Third building in Bloc83 development, after 621 Hillsborough and One Glenwood.
West at Peace	–	27	TBD	Approved	Mixed-Use	Breaking ground in 2027

== Timeline of tallest buildings ==
This lists buildings that once held the title of tallest building in Raleigh.

Name	Image	Height ft (m)	Floors	Years tallest	References
North Carolina State Capitol		97 feet (30 m)	3	1840-1859	
First Baptist Church		98 feet (30 m)	1	1859-1874	
Briggs Hardware Building		100 feet (30 m)	4	1874-1881	
Edenton Street United Methodist Church		184 feet (56 m)	N/A	1881-1956	
Wake County Office Building		206 feet (63 m)	16	1956-1964	
Capital Bank Plaza		221 feet (67 m)	15	1964-1969	
Holiday Inn Raleigh Downtown		239 feet (73 m)	20	1969-1977	
One Progress Plaza		298 feet (91 m)	21	1977-1990	
Wells Fargo Capitol Center		400 feet (122 m)	30	1990-1991	
Two Hannover Square		431 feet (131 m)	29	1991-2008	
PNC Plaza		538 feet (164 m)	32	2008–Present	

== See also ==
- List of tallest buildings in North Carolina / the United States / the world
- List of tallest buildings in Asheville
- List of tallest buildings in Charlotte
- List of tallest buildings in Greensboro
- List of tallest buildings in Winston-Salem
