= Two Hannover Square =

Coordinates: 35.7743°N 78.6399°W

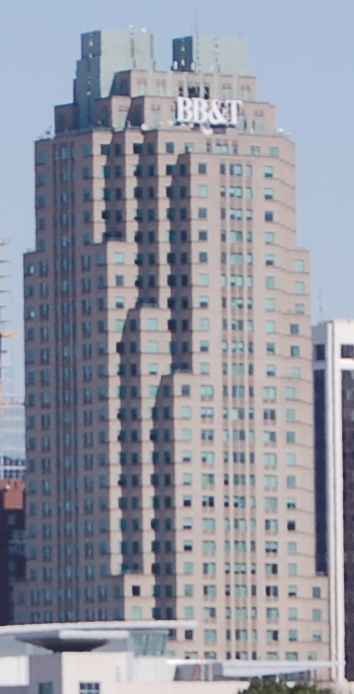
- Interactive map of the Two Hannover Square area

General information
- Status: Completed
- Type: Office
- Location: Fayetteville Street; Raleigh, North Carolina, United States
- Completed: 1991

Height
- Top floor: 431.01 ft (131.37 m)

Technical details
- Floor count: 29
- Floor area: 430,998 sq ft (40,041.0 m^{2})

Design and construction
- Structural engineer: LHC Structural Engineers

Two Hannover Square is a 29-story 431.01 ft (131.37 m) skyscraper at 434 Fayetteville Street in Raleigh, North Carolina with 433,900 square feet (40,310 m^{2}) of office space. Its major tenant is Truist bank. From its opening in 1991 until the completion of RBC Plaza in 2008, it was Raleigh's tallest building.

== History ==
Two Hannover Square, built by the same company as nearby One Hannover Square, opened in 1991 as one of the two tallest buildings in Raleigh, the other being First Union Capitol Center. Because both buildings added so much office space to downtown Raleigh at about the same time, the owners had a hard time finding tenants, and in the case of Two Hannover Plaza, the result was bankruptcy.

Phoenix Limited Partnership bought Two Hannover Plaza in 1993 for $18.5 million.

In late 2021, the building's iconic BB&T logo was replaced with that Truist Financial, the company that formed from the merger of BB&T and SunTrust Bank.

== Gallery ==
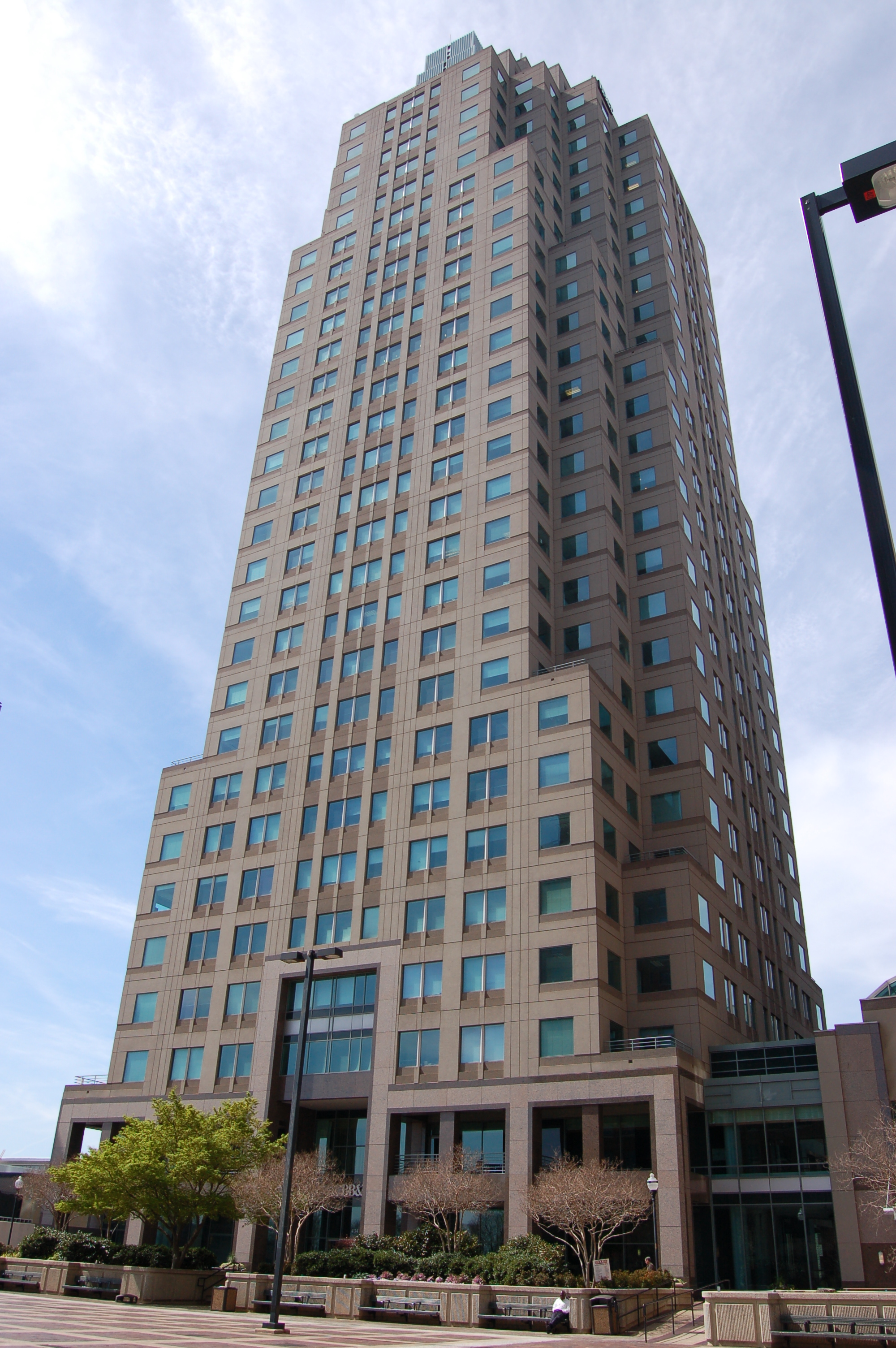
The building at street level

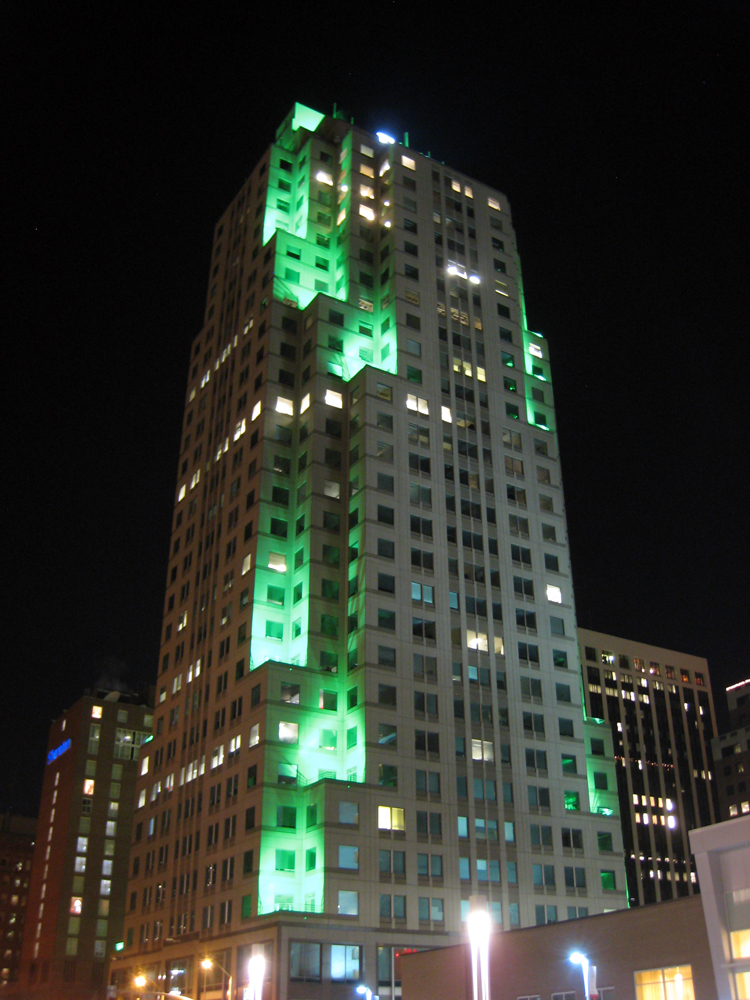
Two Hannover Square at Night

== See also ==
- List of tallest buildings in Raleigh, North Carolina
- List of tallest buildings in North Carolina
