= Red Hat Tower =

Coordinates: 35.7749°N 78.6390°W

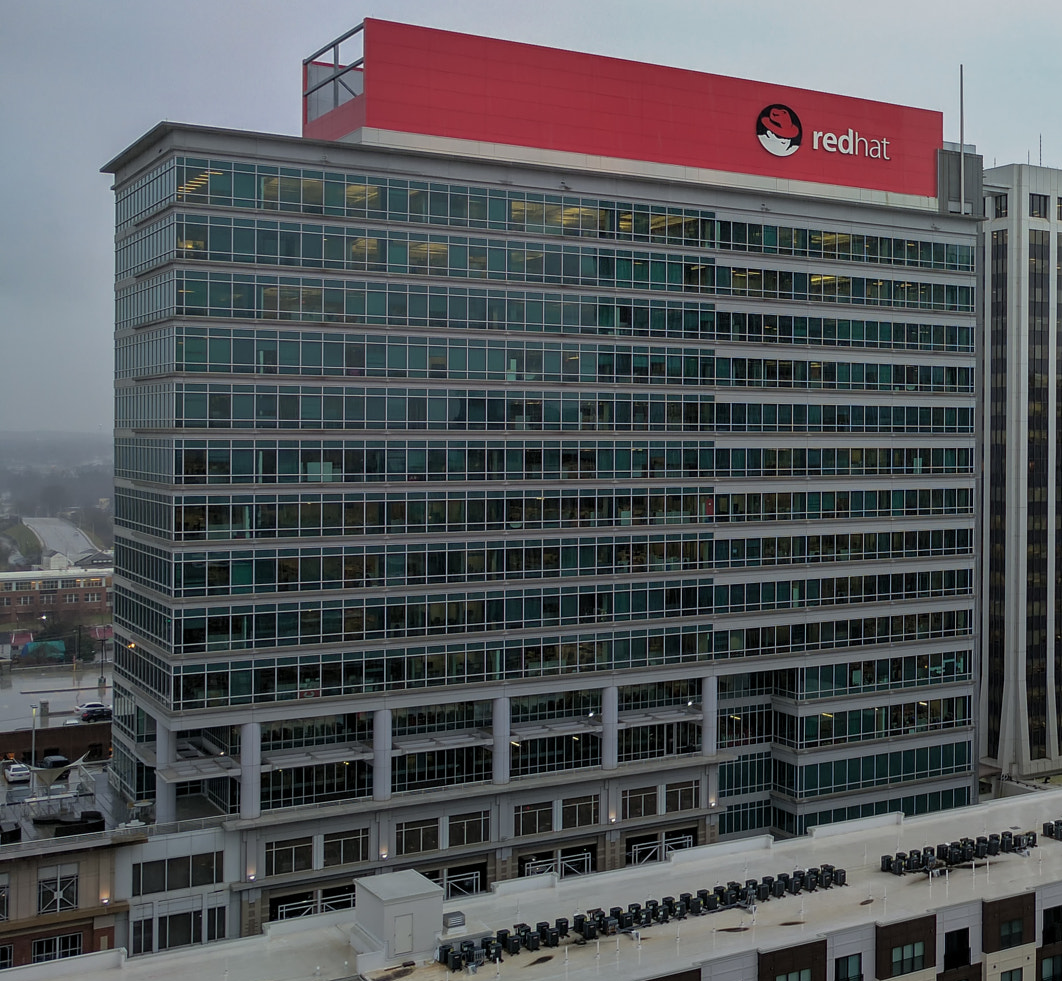
- Interactive map of the Red Hat Tower area

General information
- Type: Company headquarters
- Location: 100 East Davie Street, Raleigh, North Carolina 27601
- Completed: 2004
- Owner: JPMorgan Chase

Technical details
- Floor count: 19
- Floor area: 366,000 sq ft (34,000 m^{2})

Red Hat Tower (formerly Two Progress Tower) is the headquarters of the company Red Hat, a subsidiary of IBM. It is located in Raleigh, North Carolina, in the United States. It was completed in 2004 at a cost of $100 million as a headquarters for Progress Energy Inc, a conglomerate of Duke Energy. It has 19 floors and 366,000 square feet (34,000 m^{2}) of space.

== History ==
In 1999, Carolina Power & Light announced plans for a new headquarters tower. The 2000 merger with Florida Progress Corporation which created Progress Energy increased the need for the new building, which at the time had an estimated cost of $60 million. On February 14, 2002, Progress announced that the new project, costing $80 million, would include retail and residential space as well as offices, with a completion date of 2004. The company bought the two-acre site east of the existing headquarters in 2000. In April 2002, Progress selected Carter & Associates of Atlanta to develop the project. The 125,000-square-foot (11,600 m^{2}) first phase would be complete in 2004, with the 300,000-square-foot (28,000 m^{2}) second phase to follow in 2006. Late in 2002, Progress Energy announced its two new office buildings would be built at the same time. Instead, with commercial construction in a slump, Progress planned to speed up the larger project, which would bring together employees from a number of locations, including One Hannover Square, 333 Corporate Plaza and One Exchange Plaza in downtown Raleigh.

On September 2, 2004, the building officially opened with a ribbon-cutting ceremony.

The January 2011 announcement that Progress will merge with Duke Energy left the status of Two Progress Plaza in question, since completion of the merger could have indicated that the company needed less space. However, on August 25, 2011, Red Hat announced plans to move 600 employees from its offices on the N.C. State Centennial Campus.

Th 19-story tower was vacated by Progress Energy in 2012. Red Hat's lease began on January 1, 2013, ending August 23, 2035. In 2012, Red Hat estimated it would invest around $30 million in renovating and equipping the building. A ribbon cutting ceremony was held June 24, 2013 in the re-branded Red Hat Headquarters. The logo at the top of the tower was changed in 2019, coinciding with a rebrand at Red Hat.

== Gallery ==
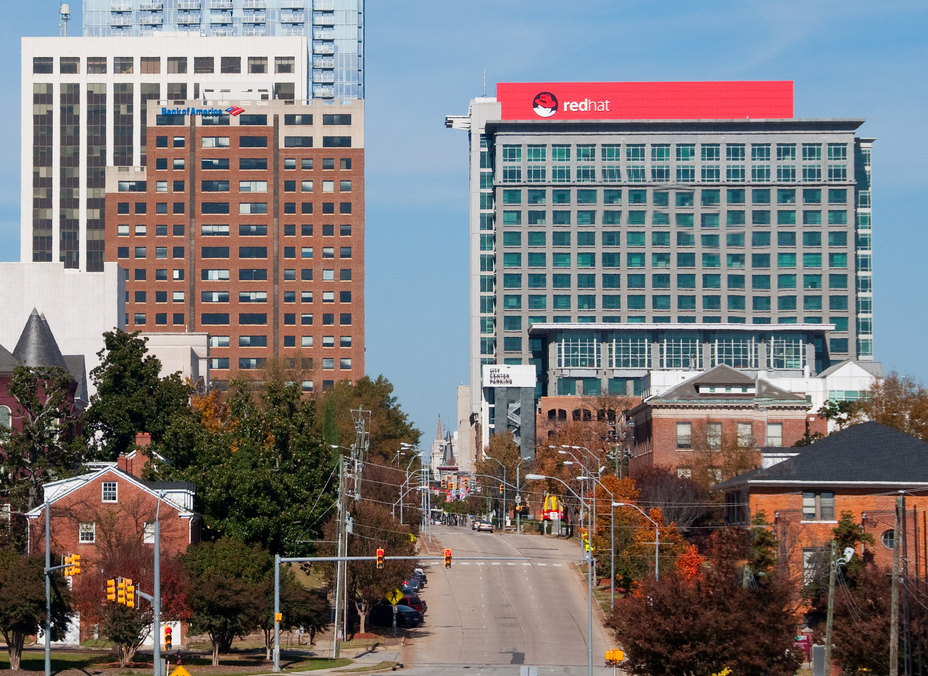
November 9, 2013

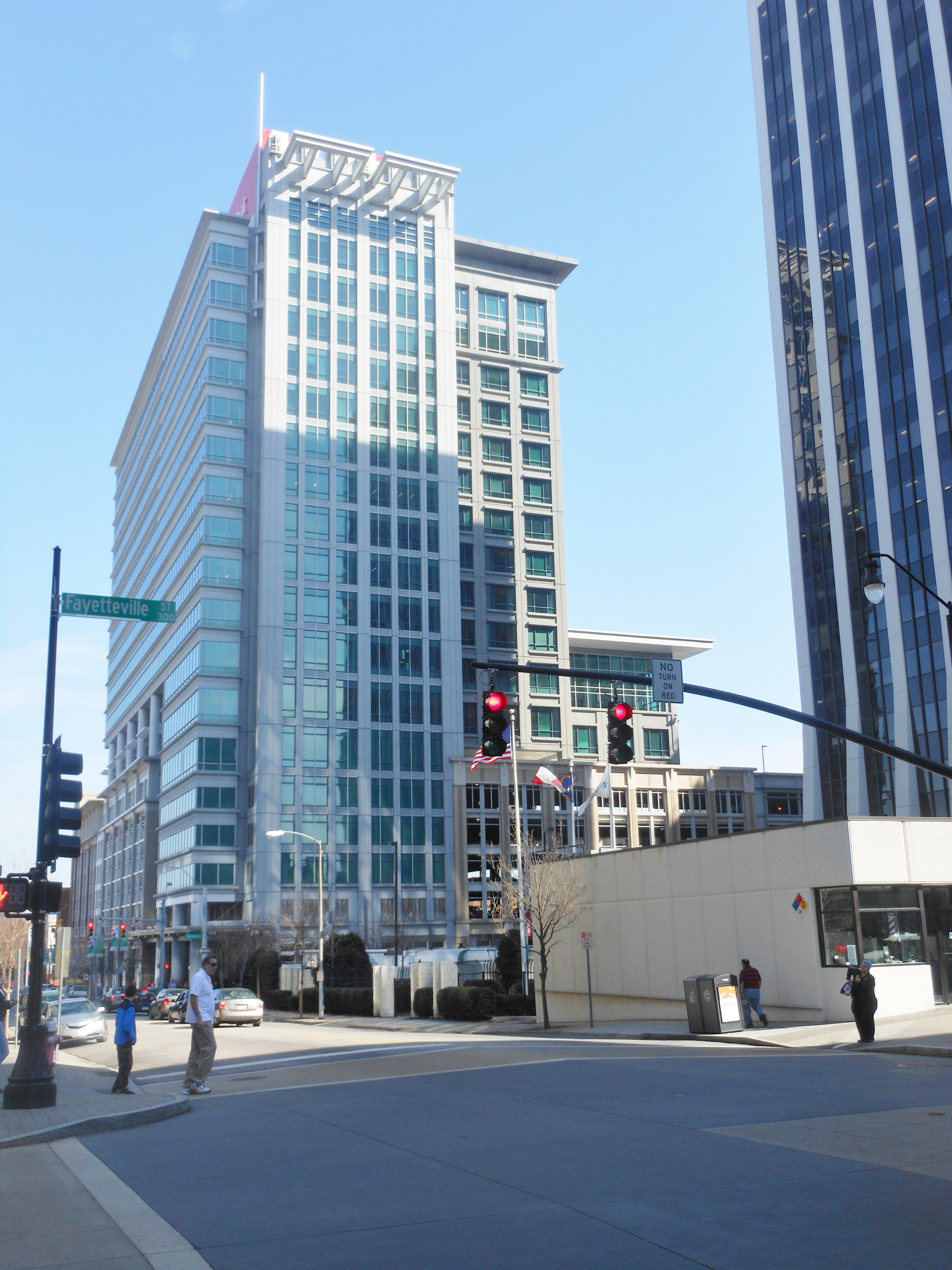
March 2, 2014

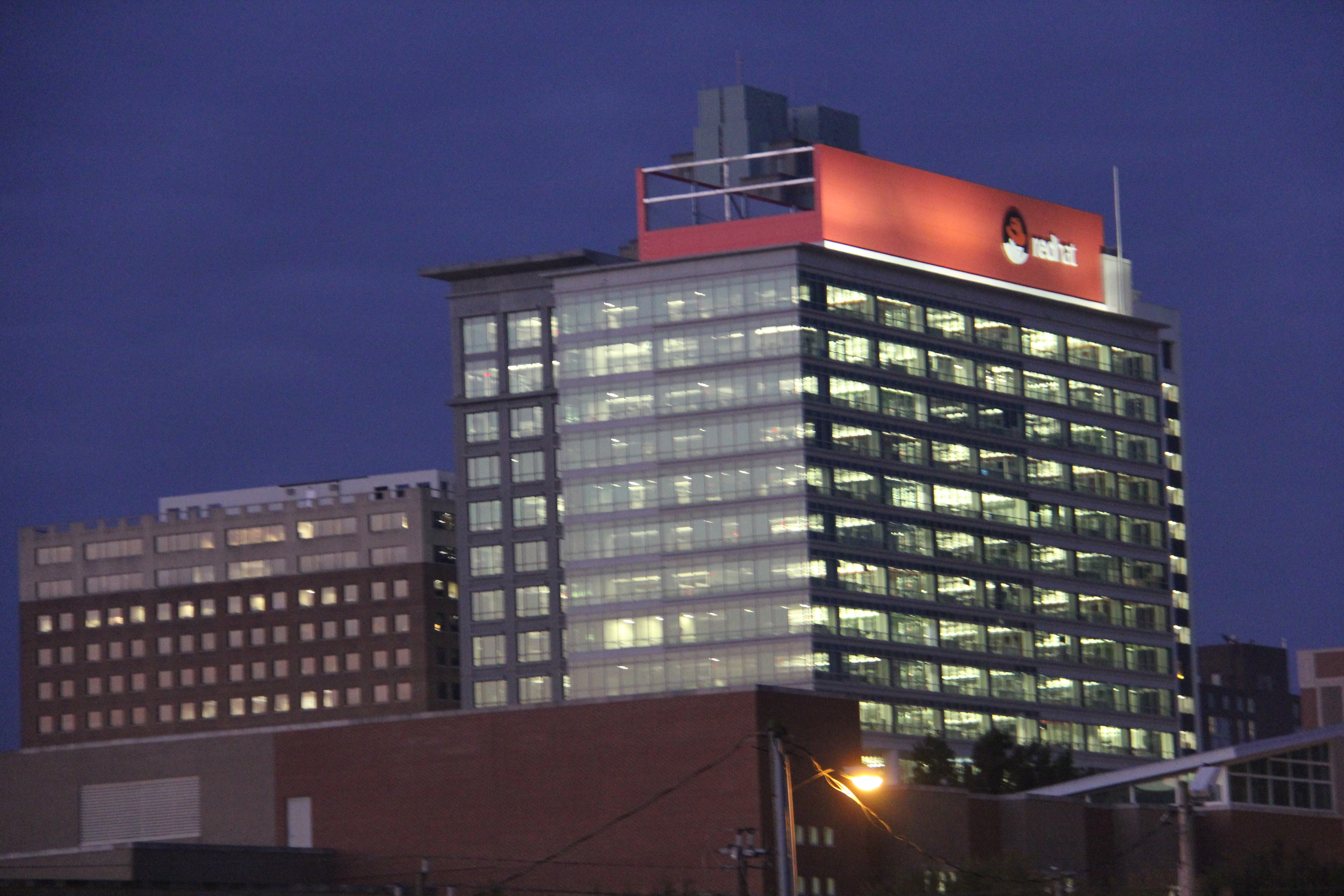
October 29, 2013

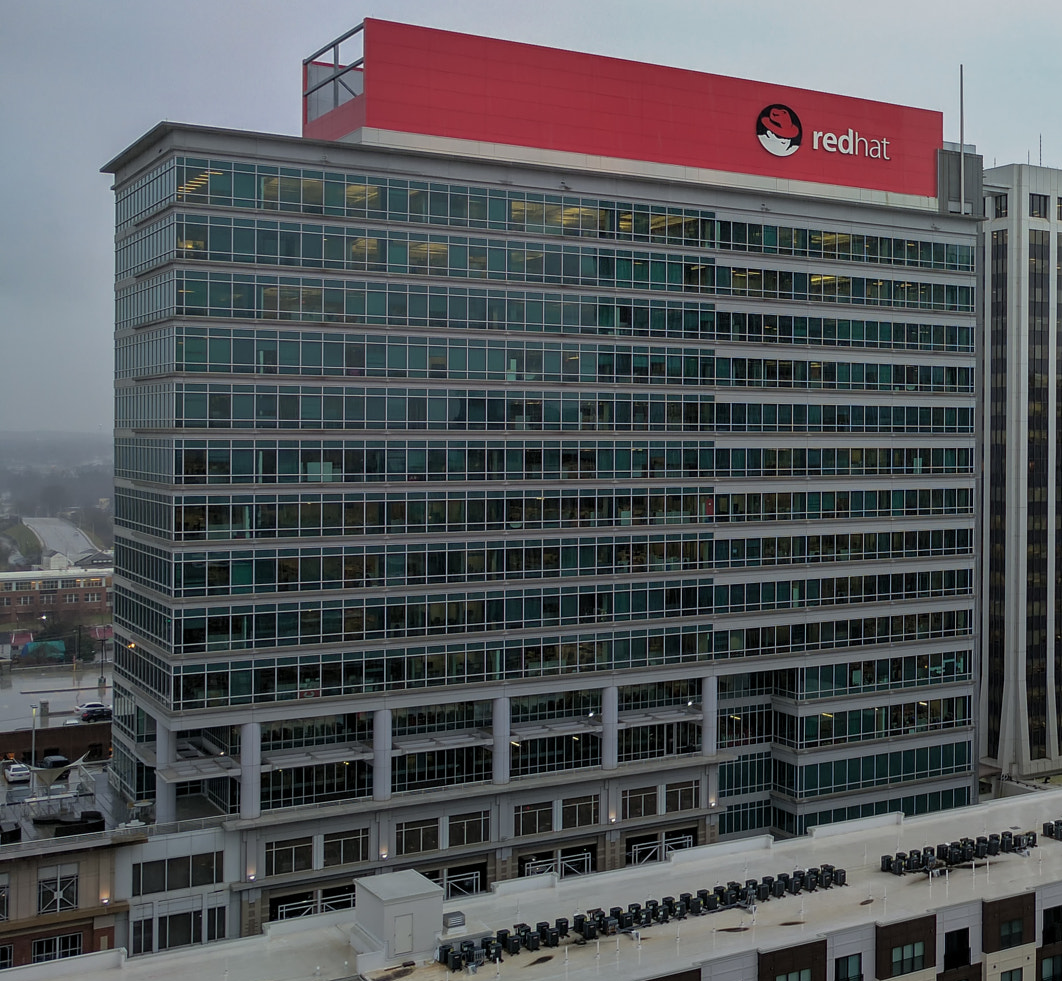
February 15, 2017
