= CommunityOne Bank =

Former American Bank

CommunityOne Bancorp
- Formerly: Bank: The First National Bank of Asheboro (1907–1970); The First National Bank of Randolph County (1970–1990); First National Bank and Trust Company (1990–2007); Holding Company: FNB Corporation (1984–2006); FNB United Corporation (2006–2013)
- Company type: Public
- Traded as: Nasdaq: COB
- Industry: Banking
- Founded: January 14, 1908; 118 years ago
- Defunct: October 26, 2016; 9 years ago
- Fate: Acquired by Capital Bank Financial
- Successor: Capital Bank (now First Horizon Bank)
- Headquarters: Asheboro, North Carolina (1907–2016); Charlotte, North Carolina (2013–2016)
- Key people: Robert L. Reid (CEO & president); David L. Nielsen (CFO)
- Total assets: ▲$2.397 billion (2015)
- Total equity: ▼$0.273 billion (2015)
- Number of employees: 544 (2015)
- Website: community1.com

CommunityOne Bancorp was a bank headquartered in Charlotte, North Carolina. In 2016, it was acquired by Capital Bank Financial.

== History ==
The First National Bank of Asheboro began operations January 14, 1908.

In 1976, the bank changed its name to First National Bank of Randolph County.

In 1985, FNB Corporation was formed as a bank holding company.

In 1990, the company changed its name to First National Bank and Trust Company.

In 2000, the company acquired Richmond Savings Bank of Richmond County, North Carolina. It was First National Bank's first foray outside of the Randolph County area.

In 2003, the company acquired Dover Mortgage Company.

In 2004, the company acquired Rowan Savings Bank of Rowan County, North Carolina.

In 2005, the company acquired Alamance Bank of Alamance County, North Carolina.

In 2006, the company acquired First Gaston Bank of Gaston County, North Carolina.

In 2006, the bank holding company changed its name to FNB United Corp.

In 2007, the bank changed its name to CommunityOne.

On April 27, 2011, the company agreed to pay $400,000 in restitution to victims of a ponzi scheme by a depositor at the bank.

In 2011, the bank acquired Bank of Granite. In conjunction with the transaction, the bank raised $310 million of capital, including $79 million from each of The Carlyle Group and Oak Hill Capital Partners.

In 2013, the bank holding company changed its name to CommunityOne Bancorp.

In 2016, the bank was acquired by Capital Bank Financial.
