= Capital Bank Financial =

Former American bank

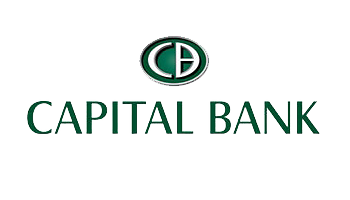
- Traded as: Nasdaq: CBF
- Industry: Bank holding company
- Founded: June 20, 1997; 29 years ago (as Capital Bank); November 30, 2009; 16 years ago (as North American Financial Holdings)
- Defunct: November 30, 2017; 8 years ago (as an independent corporation); October 25, 2019; 6 years ago (as a brand)
- Fate: Acquired by First Horizon National Corporation
- Successor: First Horizon Bank
- Headquarters: Raleigh, North Carolina (1997–2011); Coral Gables, Florida (2009–2017)
- Number of locations: 193 (2017)
- Area served: Southeastern United States
- Key people: Gene Taylor (Chief executive); Chris Marshall (CFO)
- Total assets: $10 billion (2017)
- Parent: First Horizon National Corporation (2017–2019)

Capital Bank Financial Corporation was a bank holding company headquartered in Charlotte, North Carolina, with $10 billion in assets as of first quarter 2017 and 193 branches. Former Bank of America vice chairman Gene Taylor was chief executive, former Bank of America executive and Fifth Third Bank CFO, Chris Marshall was CFO and former Bank of America executive, R. Bruce Singletary was Chief Risk Officer. Former Morgan Stanley specialty finance research analyst, Kenneth Posner, managed corporate strategy and investor relations. North American Financial Holdings (NAFH) original purpose was to take over banks that had difficulties due to the 2008 financial crisis. The company's main interest was banks in the Carolinas and Florida, but in 2011, NAFH moved into Tennessee and Virginia. Despite buying seven distressed, money losing banks, NAFH's Capital Bank was consistently profitable during the duration of its existence and consistently posted improved returns for each of its five years of operations. Capital Bank completed a successful IPO in September 2012, and used to trade on the NASDAQ under the ticker CBF until its acquisition by First Horizon National Corporation in November 2017.

== History ==
=== North American Financial Holdings ===
In December 2009, NAFH raised $900 million from such sources as private equity firms Crestview Partners, Oak Hill Advisors and Falfurrias Capital Partners. In March 2010 the OCC granted NAFH a national bank charter, and the search began for banks to acquire.

On June 29, 2010, Naples, Florida–based TIB Financial Corporation, parent of TIB Bank and Naples Capital Advisors, announced that NAFH had agreed to invest $175 million in the company. Over the next 18 months, NAFH would have the right to invest $175 million more. The deal was completed in third quarter 2010.

As of July 16, 2010, NAFH owned MetroBank of Dade County, Florida; Turnberry Bank of Aventura, Florida; and First National Bank of the South in Spartanburg, South Carolina. These four banks, after approval of the TIB deal, give NAFH $3.1 billion in assets, and 10 branches in the Miami, Florida area and 13 in South Carolina, plus 28 more branches in southwest Florida with the completion of the TIB deal. NAFH did not pay the Federal Deposit Insurance Corporation a premium for the three banks' deposits, and entered into loss-share agreements with the FDIC on about $1 billion of their assets.

Hugh McColl, co-founder of Falfurrias and former Bank of America CEO, predicted NAFH would have $20 billion in assets in five to seven years.

As of March 31, 2010, MetroBank had $442.3 million in assets with $391.3 million in deposits. Turnberry Bank had $263.9 million in assets with $196.9 million in deposits. First National had $682.0 million in assets and deposits totalling $610.1 million.

=== Capital Bank ===
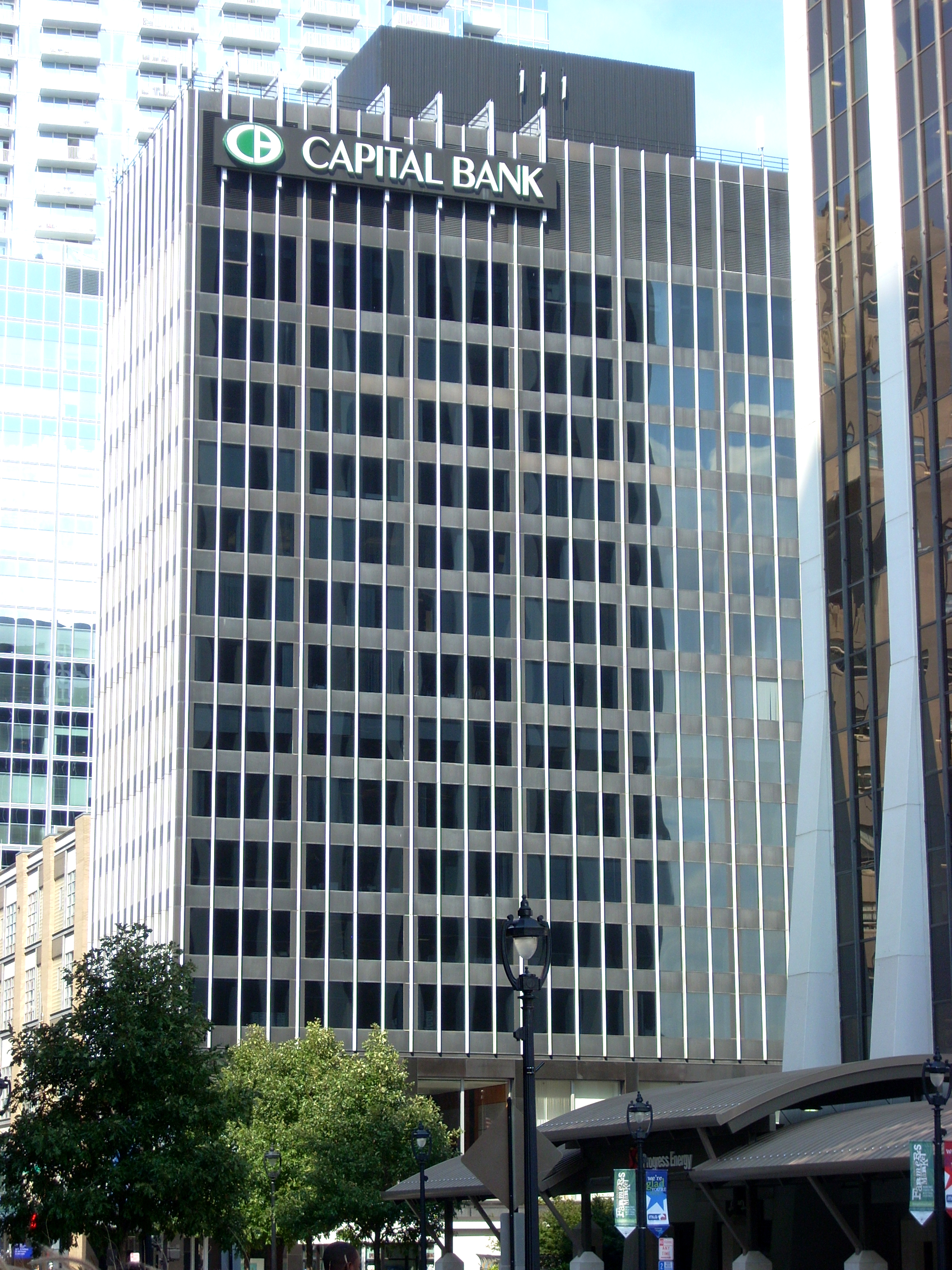
Capital Bank's headquarters in Raleigh

On December 16, 2010, shareholders of Raleigh, North Carolina–based Capital Bank approved selling a majority interest to NAFH, which would buy newly issued stock rather than stock from existing shareholders. Capital Bank began in 1997 as the Triangle's first new bank in eight years, after raising $26 million, the most for a new bank in the state's history. Capital Bank reorganized under a holding company, Capital Bank Corporation in 1998. By 2005, after expansion and buying other banks, Capital had $915 million in assets, and by 2010, assets had reached $1.7 billion. The Late-2000s recession hurt Capital, and regulators expected the bank to act. At one time, selling new stock was considered. Finally, Capital chose to accept help from NAFH. The deal originally depended on NAFH being able to get a 50% discount on preferred stock and warrants acquired by the U.S. Treasury during the 2008 financial crisis. However, in a January 18, 2011 interview, Capital CEO Grant Yarber said the federal government would get all its money back.

On January 28, 2011, NAFH completed its $181 million deal for 85 percent of Capital. NAFH CEO Gene Taylor became CEO of Capital, replacing Yarber, whose new title was market president for North Carolina.

All NAFH-owned banks continued to operate separately but the company announced its intention to re-brand the banks as Capital Bank. Capital had 32 branches before the deal, but after adding the four other NAFH banks, the total was 84. Capital kept its Raleigh headquarters. When the deal was closed, North American's banks had more than $5 billion in assets, placing them among the nations top 125 banks.

Late in April 2011, NAFH applied to the Comptroller of the Currency for a merger of all of the banks into NAFH National Bank, a nationally chartered bank which operates as Capital Bank, National Association (later renamed Capital Bank Corporation (Note: Though they share the same name, this is a separate entity from the former holding company of Capital Bank of Raleigh.)). The Capital Bank headquarters then relocated from Raleigh's Capital Bank Plaza, where it moved in 2006, to Miami, Florida. Raleigh would still have such operations as technology and loan processing at what CFO Christopher Marshall described as the "working headquarters". The headquarters change put Capital in the Federal Reserve Bank's Atlanta, Georgia territory, though this made the merger easier because as a Florida-based company, NAFH was already under Atlanta's jurisdiction. A Raleigh headquarters would have put the bank under Richmond, Virginia, which would have required the same changes as a move.

On May 5, 2011, NAFH announced a $217 million deal for 90 percent of Greeneville, Tennessee–based Green Bankshares Inc., with 65 GreenBank branches and $2.5 billion in assets. GreenBank CEO Steve Rownd would be Tennessee market president. With the completion of this transaction in the third quarter, NAFH had $7.1 billion in assets (putting the company in the nation's top 100 banks), $5.4 billion in deposits, and 146 branches in five states. NAFH also bought the remainder of TIB and Capital.Capital Bank merged into NAFH National Bank on June 30, 2011. Its holding company, Capital Bank Corporation, formally merged into Capital Bank Financial Corporation on September 1, 2011.

In June 2011, NAFH filed with the SEC to raise up to $300 million in an initial public offering. Because the market was not doing well, NAFH postponed the IPO until 2012, after the holding company had changed its name to Capital Bank Financial Corporation.

In a news release dated March 27, 2012, Capital Bank Financial Corp. said it agreed to buy Southern Community Financial Corp. of Winston-Salem, North Carolina, whose Southern Community Bank and Trust had $1.5 billion in assets and 22 branches, for $2.88 a share. Southern Community, started in 1996, was Winston-Salem's third-largest bank by deposits. The completion of the deal was expected to give Capital Bank Financial $8.1 billion in assets and 165 branches.

On October 26, 2016, Capital Bank completed its acquisition of CommunityOne Bank, with $2.4 billion in assets and 45 branches and based in Charlotte, North Carolina, in a deal worth $350 million.

On November 30, 2017, Memphis, Tennessee–based First Horizon National Corporation completed its $2.2 billion purchase of Capital Bank. The Capital Bank name continued to be used outside Tennessee until October 2019. Former Capital Bank chief Executive Gene Taylor was added to the First Horizon board of directors as vice chair in addition to receiving over $7 million in change-of-control compensation, while Capital Bank CFO Chris Marshall and Capital Bank CRO R. Bruce Singletary received $4.89 million and $3.34 million respectively. Posner received $2.81 million.

Capital Bank announced in October 2018 that it would lease two floors of the ten-story One Glenwood in Raleigh. The lease included a sign on the building.

On October 25, 2019, Capital Bank and First Tennessee Bank were unified and rebranded as First Horizon Bank.
