= Soleil Center =

The Soleil Center would have stood as the second-tallest building in Raleigh.

The Soleil Center was a planned 43-story skyscraper and condo-hotel planned for Raleigh, North Carolina, United States. It was cancelled as a result of the drop in hotel demand during the Great Recession and the land was sold at foreclosure.

The 480 ft (146 m) building was to be located next to the Crabtree Mall on Glenwood Avenue (US 70) just north of the I-440 beltline, in an area variously known as "Midtown Raleigh" or "Uptown Raleigh". The Soleil Center was intended to be the second tallest building in Raleigh and in the Triangle region. The PNC Plaza building in downtown Raleigh is the tallest.

The Soleil Center was to contain a 290-room four-star Westin Hotels & Resorts, 54 condominiums, 100,000 sq ft (9,300 m^{2}) of office space, a spa and a 600-car parking garage. The total cost for the project was estimated to be $175 million and was a private investment project of the Soleil Group.

The construction project was approved by the Raleigh City Council in November 2005, but after uneven bedrock conditions were discovered, test drilling of every column location was required causing a year-long delay.

The original plan by developers was to build just a hotel, the Westin Hotel Crabtree, but no residences. After additional funding and investors were secured, the Soleil Group decided on building the larger project.

The Soleil Center was to replace the old hotel operating as a Sheraton Hotels and Resorts that was imploded in May 2006. The condominiums, officially called The Westin Raleigh Soleil Center Residences, were priced starting at $1 million and the penthouse apartments at $4.5 million, making the residences the most expensive condos in the area.

The Great Recession destroyed demand for luxury condos, and the project was scaled back in late 2008 to just a 16-story hotel under the Westin Hotels & Resorts franchise, with the possibility of constructing the condo tower atop it at a later date.

The Soleil Group had plans to build a second tower, the 18-story Soleil II, that would have connected to the first building and offered additional office space.

In 2011, the property was headed to a foreclosure auction. A private equity firm bailed out the developers.

In 2014, the owners listed the property for sale for $7.5 million.

In 2015, the property finally went to foreclosure and in June 2015, the land was sold for $5.35 million in a foreclosure auction.
