= The Eastern (Raleigh) =

Apartment building in Raleigh, North Carolina, United States

The Eastern Residences at North Hills
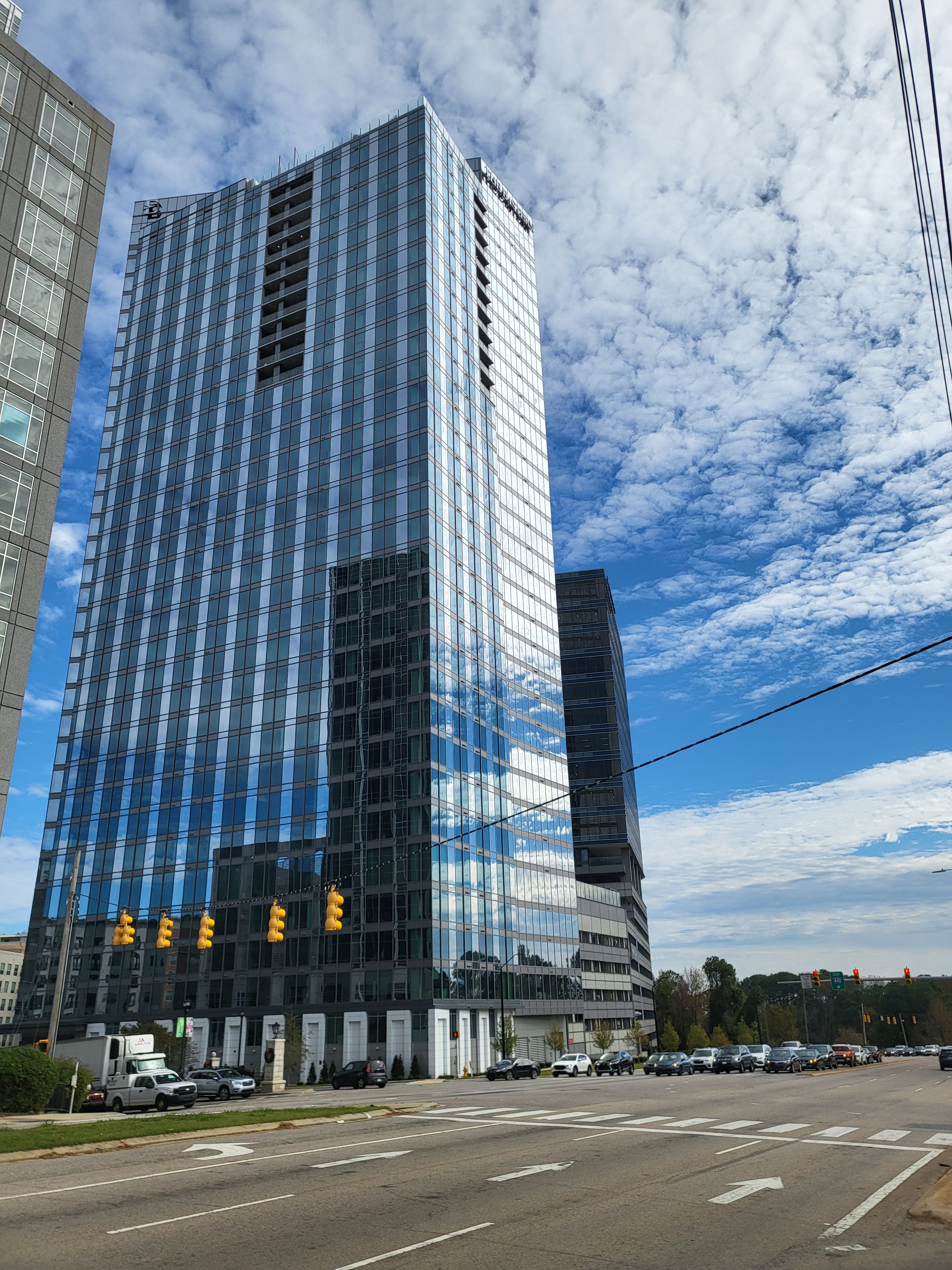
- Interactive map of the The Eastern Residences at North Hills area

General information
- Status: Completed
- Type: Retail, Residential
- Location: North Hills; Raleigh, North Carolina, United States of America
- Coordinates: 35°50′10.3″N 78°38′23.4″W
- Completed: April 2022

Height
- Top floor: 377 ft (115 m)

Technical details
- Floor count: 36

Design and construction
- Architect: Smallwood
- Main contractor: Balfour Beatty Construction

The Eastern, formerly known as Walter Tower, is the 4th tallest skyscraper in the city of Raleigh, North Carolina, United States. The tower rises to a height of 377 feet (115 m), and is situated on a 2.6-acre (11,000 m^{2}) lot along with the 257-foot (78 m) Advance Auto Parts Tower in North Hills. Upon completion, the tower became the 31st tallest in North Carolina, and the 8th tallest in North Carolina outside of Charlotte, North Carolina.

Developed by Kane Realty, The Eastern is also the tallest residential building in Raleigh. It contains 376 residential units, which range from studios to three-bedroom units. The top three floors contain penthouse units.

== See also ==
- List of tallest buildings in Raleigh, North Carolina
- List of tallest buildings in North Carolina
