= Captrust Tower =

High-rise building in Raleigh, North Carolina, US

Coordinates: 35.8369°N 78.6399°W

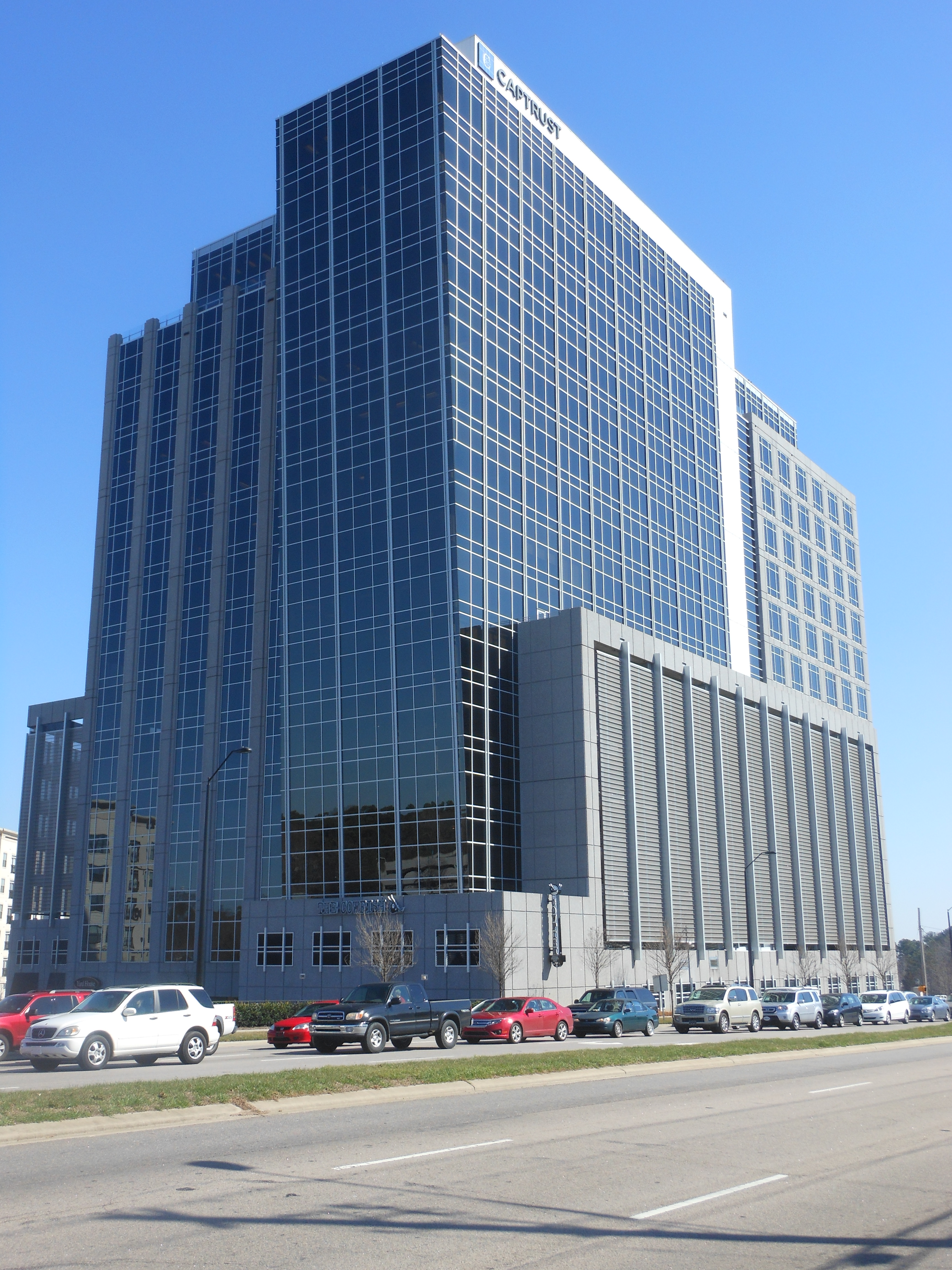
Captrust Tower in North Hills, Raleigh, North Carolina

Captrust Tower is a 17-story 260 feet (79 m) mixed use high-rise building located in North Hills, Raleigh, North Carolina. The tower opened in the fall of 2009. It has 274,000 square feet (25,500 m^{2}) of office space and 28,400 square feet (2,640 m^{2}) of retail space. It is named for Captrust Financial Advisors, the first tenant, which uses 51,000 square feet (4,700 m^{2}) on the top two floors for its headquarters. Captrust Tower was built by Duke Realty Corp. of Indianapolis and Kane Realty Corp. of Raleigh. KSB realty Advisors of Newport Beach, California, announced its $98.4 million purchase of the building January 31, 2013.

When the tower was announced in 2007, Captrust Financial Advisors had 75 employees and managed $20 billion in assets, with plans to expand westward. The company advised companies with retirement plans as well as individuals.
