= Duke Realty =

American real estate company

Duke Realty Corporation
- Industry: REIT
- Founded: 1972; 54 years ago
- Founder: John Rosebrough; Phil Duke; John Wynne
- Defunct: October 3, 2022; 3 years ago
- Fate: Acquired by Prologis
- Headquarters: Indianapolis, Indiana, U.S.
- Key people: James B. Connor (Chairman and CEO)
- Number of employees: 340 (December 31, 2021)

Duke Realty was a real estate investment trust (REIT) based in Indianapolis, Indiana, that invested in industrial properties. As of December 31, 2021, it owned or jointly controlled 548 primarily industrial properties containing 162.7 million rentable square feet. In October 2022, it was acquired by Prologis.

Notable properties developed by the company include the Captrust Tower in Raleigh, North Carolina, and the Scripps Center in Cincinnati, Ohio.

== History ==
P.R. Duke Construction and Duke Development Companies were formed in 1972 by Philip R. Duke, John Rosebrough, and John Wynne with $40,000 of capital. Its first development was in the Park 100 neighborhood in northwest Indianapolis. In 1985, Duke realty Investments was formed. Phil Duke sold his shares in 1986 and Duke Associates was formed as the holding company of P.R. Duke Construction Company and P.R. Duke Realty.

In 1993, the company announced that Duke Realty Investment would become a public company via an IPO on the New York Stock Exchange, which raised $310 million. In 1999, it merged with Weeks Corporation, another REIT with properties primarily in the Southwestern United States.

In 2006, it acquired 32 buildings in the Washington, D.C., area from the Mark Winkler Company.

In May 2017, it sold its medical office properties to Healthcare Trust of America for $2.8 billion to focus on its industrial properties.

In July 2017, Duke Realty was added to the S&P 500.

In October 2022, the company was acquired by Prologis for $23 billion.
