= One Progress Plaza (Raleigh, North Carolina) =

Coordinates: 35.7749°N 78.6390°W

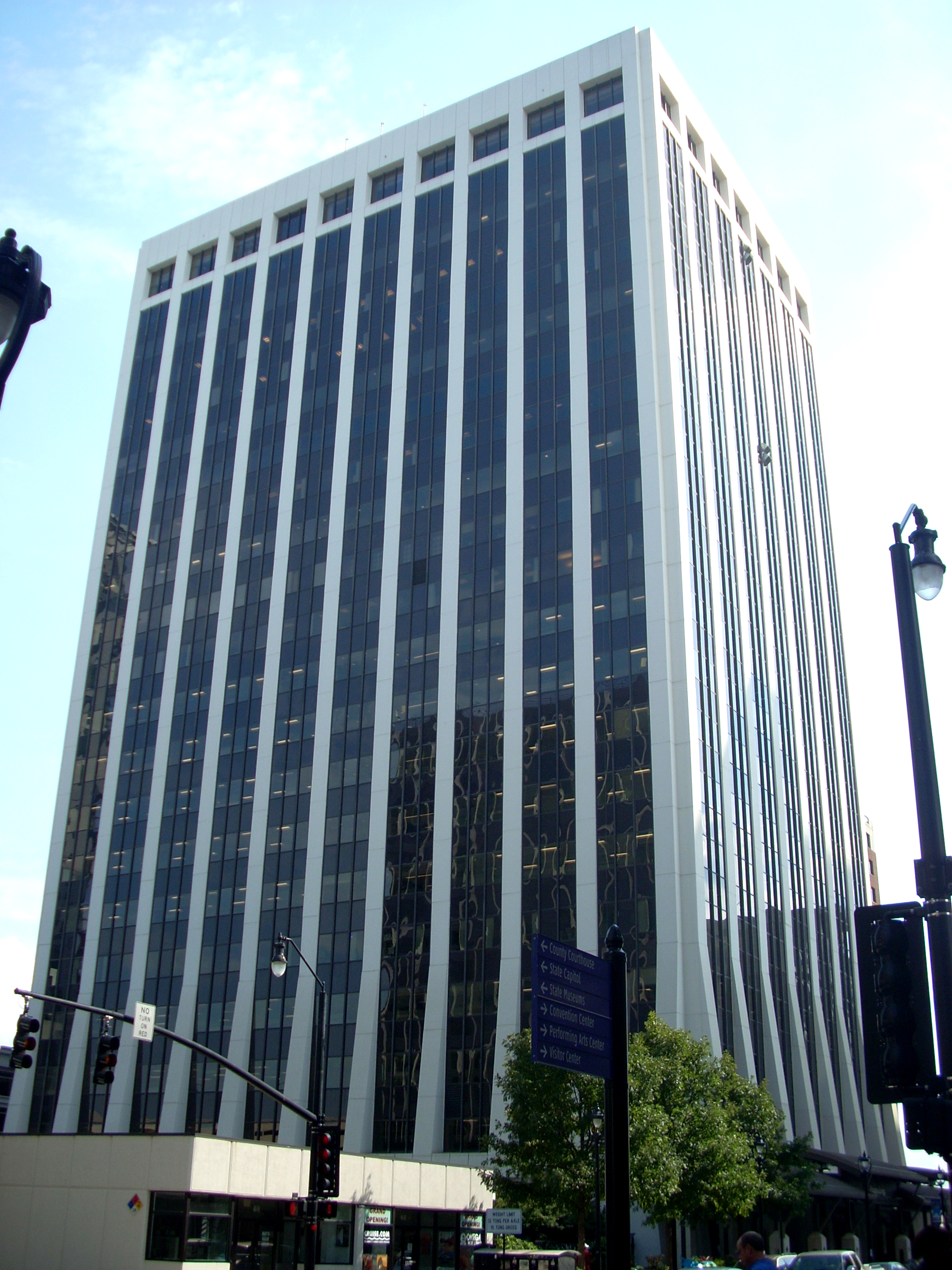
- One Progress Plaza building.
- Interactive map of the One Progress Plaza area
- Former names: Center Plaza; CP&L Building; Progress Energy Building

General information
- Type: Company headquarters
- Location: 411 Fayetteville Street, Raleigh, North Carolina
- Completed: 1977
- Owner: Hawthorn Associates

Technical details
- Floor count: 21
- Floor area: 441,320 sq ft (41,000 m^{2})

One Progress Plaza is a high-rise building in Raleigh, North Carolina. It was completed in 1977 as a headquarters for Carolina Power & Light (now Progress Energy Inc) and has 21 floors and 440,000 square feet (41,000 m^{2}) of space. It is owned by Hawthorn Associates.

Former names include Center Plaza, CP&L Building, and Progress Energy Building. In 1999, Carolina Power & Light announced plans for a new headquarters tower. The 2000 merger with Florida Progress Corporation which created Progress Energy increased the need for the new building. The company bought the two-acre site east of the existing headquarters in 2000.

On August 27, 2003, Progress Energy named its headquarters Progress Plaza, intending the name to refer to its entire complex of buildings. Once the new headquarters was complete, the plan was to call the existing headquarters One Progress Plaza and the new building Two Progress Plaza.

The January 2011 announcement that Progress will merge with Duke Energy left the status of One Progress Plaza in question, since completion of the merger would likely mean the company needs less space. However, on August 25, 2011, Red Hat announced plans to take over Two Progress Plaza, which forced Progress Energy to move its entire Raleigh operation into One Progress Plaza upon completion of the merger.

== See also ==
- List of tallest buildings in Raleigh
