= Scripps Center =

High-rise office building located in Cincinnati

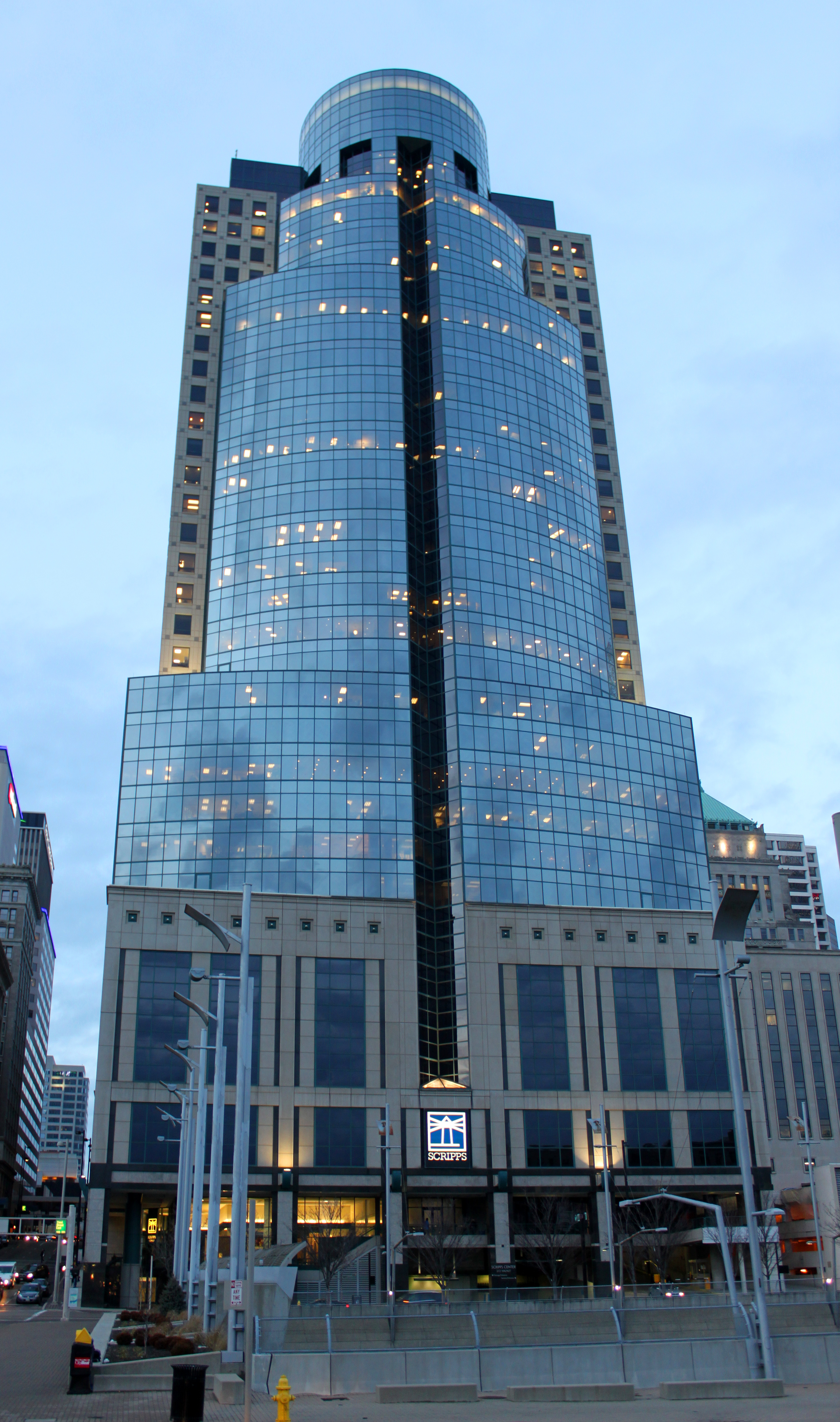
- (2013)
- Interactive map of the Scripps Center area

General information
- Status: Completed
- Type: Office
- Architectural style: Post-modern
- Completed: 1990

Height
- Height: 468 ft (143 m)

Technical details
- Floor count: 36
- Lifts/elevators: 15

Design and construction
- Developer: Duke Realty Corporation
- Main contractor: Duke Construction

The Scripps Center is a high-rise office building located at 312 Walnut Street at the corner of 3rd Street in the central business district of Cincinnati, Ohio. At the height of 468.01 feet (142.65 m), with 35 stories, it is the fourth tallest building in the city, and the tallest added between the building of Carew Tower in 1931 and the opening of the Great American Tower at Queen City Square – the tallest building in Cincinnati – in 2011. It was completed in 1990, and includes 500,000 square feet (46,000 m^{2}) of office space.

The building was designed by Houston architects Hoover & Furr; Glaser & Associates was architect of record. It was developed by Duke Realty and Manuel D. Mayerson (1922-2012), whose family continue to own the property, and was constructed by developer Daniel C. Staton of Duke Realty Corporation.

The headquarters of the E. W. Scripps Company is located in the Scripps Center, and it also serves as the 'studio' building for regulatory purposes for the stations of Ion Media (acquired by Scripps in early 2021), which are otherwise completely automated. Though WCPO-TV (channel 9) is owned by Scripps, it maintains its own studios in the Mount Adams neighborhood to the northeast of Scripps Center. The building is designed to look like a lighthouse, tying in with the company's logo, which in turn is based on the Scripps corporate motto -- "Give light and the people will find their own way."

Completed just prior to the 1990 World Series, cameras were then mounted on the roof providing aerial stadium views of the hometown team's victory. During the 2015 Major League Baseball All-Star Game played in Cincinnati, the upper exterior of the Scripps Center was decorated with a gigantic hat and mustache, giving it the appearance of a 19th-century Cincinnati Redlegs player. Despite public support for keeping the decorations permanently, the mustache and hat were removed after the game. Television cameras were again mounted on the building's roof to provide aerial views of the game.
