= 150 Fayetteville =

Coordinates: 35.7787°N 78.6396°W

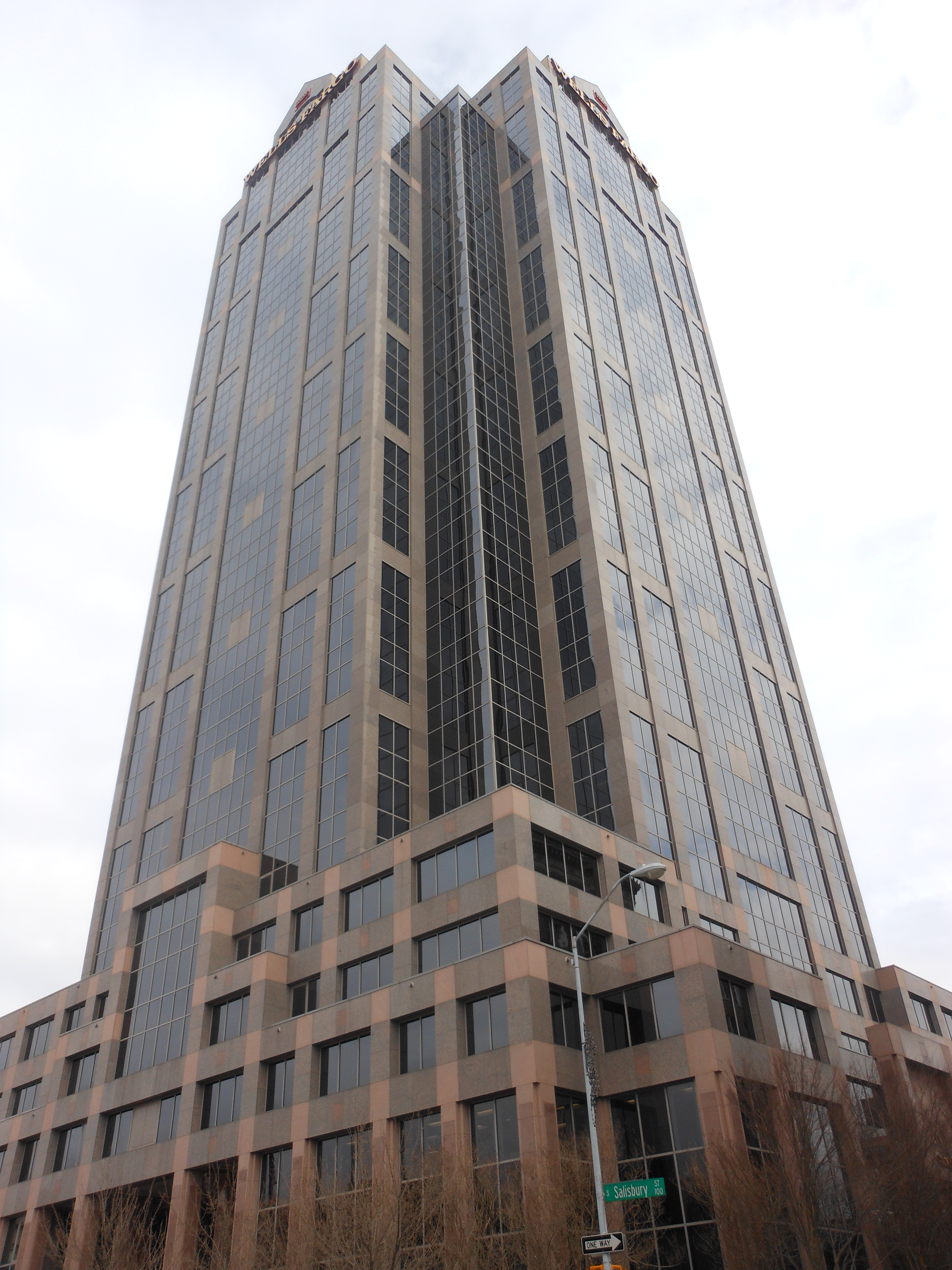
- 150 Fayetteville In Downtown Raleigh.
- Interactive map of the 150 Fayetteville area
- Former names: First Union Capitol Center, Wachovia Capitol Center, Wells Fargo Capitol Center

General information
- Status: Completed
- Type: Retail/Office
- Location: Fayetteville Street; Raleigh, North Carolina, United States, 150 Fayetteville Street; Raleigh, NC 27601
- Completed: June 1990
- Operator: Highwoods Properties

Height
- Top floor: 121.92 m (400.0 ft)

Technical details
- Floor count: 30
- Floor area: 544,482 sq ft (50,584.0 m^{2})

Design and construction
- Architects: Stevens & Wilkins
- Main contractor: McDevitt & Street

150 Fayetteville (formerly Wells Fargo Capitol Center, Wachovia Capitol Center and First Union Capitol Center) is a 30-story 121.92 m high-rise skyscraper at 150 Fayetteville Street in Raleigh, North Carolina with 544,482 square feet (50,584.0 m^{2}) of space. Completed in 1990, it was one of the downtown Raleigh's two tallest buildings for nearly twenty years, and is currently third tallest.

== History ==
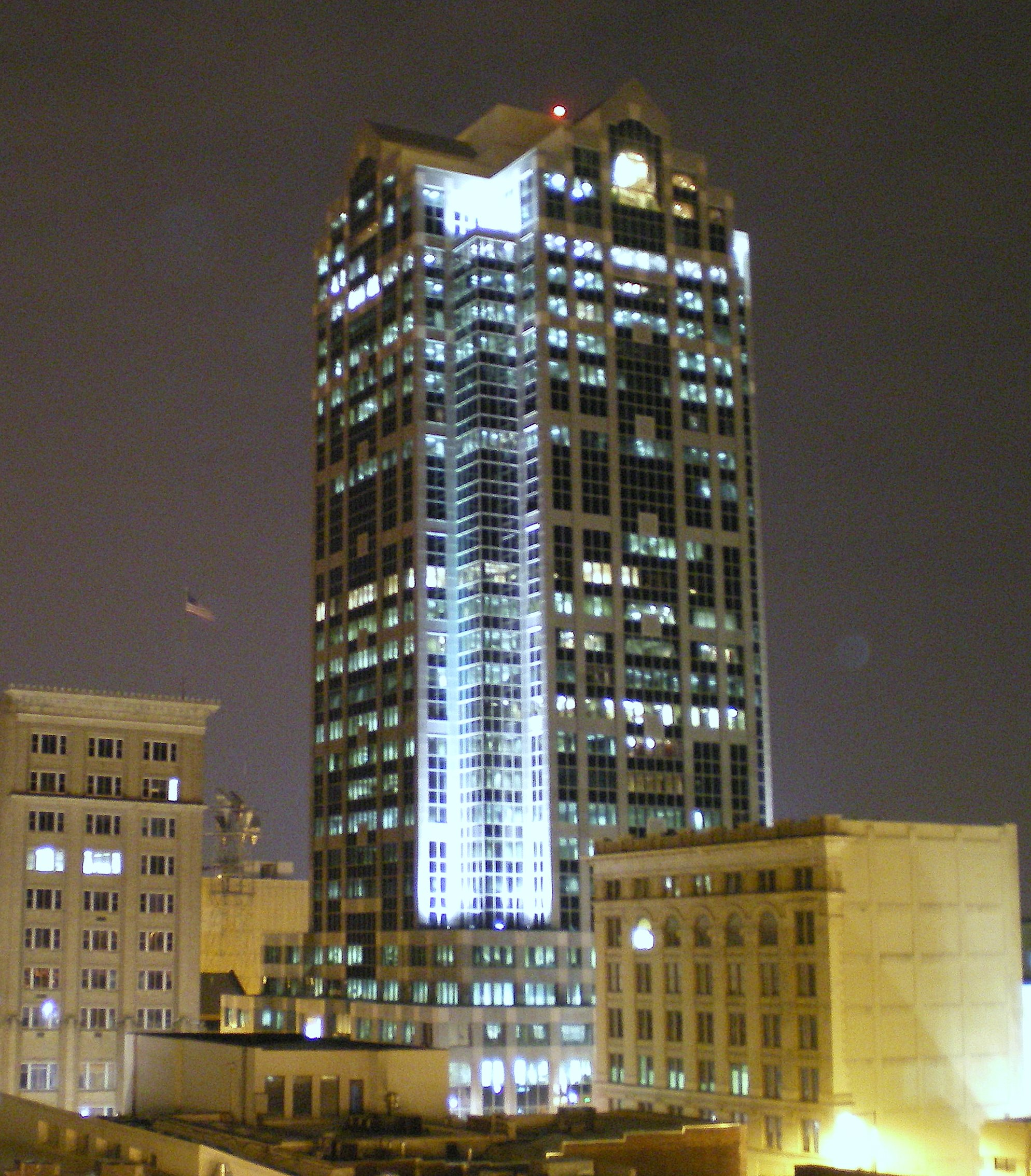
Wachovia now Wells Fargo at night

In 1999, DRA Advisors bought First Union Capitol Center.

After the merger of First Union and Wachovia, Wachovia moved out of its 11-story 110,000 square feet (10,000 m^{2}) building built in 1961.

On January 31, 2007, Argus Realty Investors LP of San Clemente, California paid $153.4 million for Wachovia Capitol Center and its parking deck, plus retail space across the street. The amount was the most ever paid for a Triangle office building. At the time, Wachovia occupied 105,788 square feet (9,828.0 m^{2}), and other major tenants included Deloitte & Touche, PriceWaterhouse Coopers, Merrill Lynch, and KPMG, as well as the city's largest law firm Smith Anderson Blount.

As a result of six transactions, HighBrook Investors paid $42.74 million for 31.57 percent of Wells Fargo Capitol Center, whose ownership is a tenants in common structure. As of December 4, 2015, the building had 192,181 square feet (17,854.2 m^{2}) of leasable space available, with 20,451 square feet (1,900.0 m^{2}) more expected in 2016. Major tenants other than Wells Fargo included Brooks Pierce, Smith Anderson, BHDP Architecture and RM Source. Parker Poe had already left and Womble Carlyle Sandridge & Rice planned to move in 2016.

== See also ==
- List of tallest buildings in Raleigh
