= FNB Tower (Raleigh) =

Mixed-use skyscraper in Raleigh, North Carolina

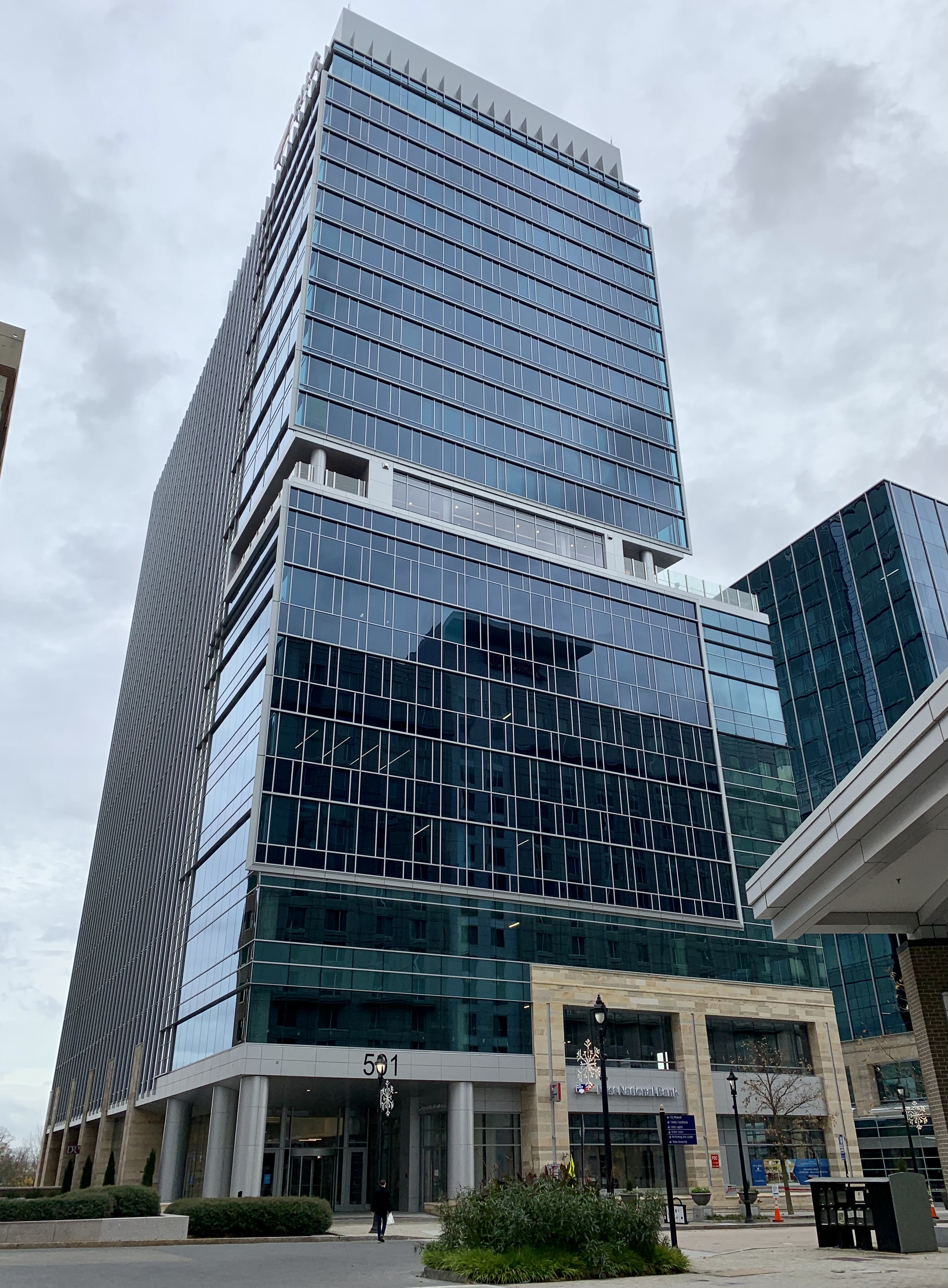
- Interactive map of the FNB Tower area

General information
- Status: Completed
- Location: 501 Fayetteville Street
- Coordinates: 35.77335556749304°N 78.63911282212463°W
- Construction started: May 2018
- Completed: December 2019
- Cost: $116 million

Height
- Height: 358 ft (109 m)

Technical details
- Floor count: 22

Design and construction
- Architect: JDavis Architects
- Main contractor: Choate Construction Company

FNB Tower is a 22-story, 358-foot-tall (109 m) skyscraper in Raleigh, North Carolina. The mixed-use development contains 239 luxury apartments along with office and retail space. FNB Tower is located at 501 Fayetteville Street.

== History ==
FNB Tower was proposed by Dominion Realty Partners to redevelop an underground parking deck in 2017. The plans for FNB Tower called for the building to be anchored by Pittsburgh-based First National Bank Corporation, with the tower containing the company's regional headquarters as well as an FNB retail branch. FNB Tower held a groundbreaking ceremony on May 3, 2018, with expected completion in 2020. FNB Tower would officially open on December 4, 2019. The project cost an estimated $116 million. FNB Tower contains 156,000 square feet of office space, 11,000 square feet of retail space, and 239 luxury apartments.

== Construction ==
FNB Tower was designed by Raleigh-based JDavis Architects. Choate Construction Company served as the main contractor for the project. FNB Tower features floor-to-ceiling windows as well as vertical mirror glass fins.

== See also ==
- List of tallest buildings in Raleigh, North Carolina
- List of tallest buildings in North Carolina
