= Captrust =

American investment advisory company

- Type: Private
- Industry: Financial services
- Founded: 1997
- Headquarters: Raleigh, North Carolina
- Area served: United States
- AUM: ▲USD$220 billion (2025)
- Number of employees: 1,960 (2025)
- Website: https://www.captrust.com/

CAPTRUST Financial Advisors (commonly referred to as CAPTRUST) is a U.S.-based independent investment advisory and fiduciary services firm based in Raleigh, North Carolina. CAPTRUST provides investment advisory, fiduciary support, risk-management and wealth-planning services.

== Background and history ==
CAPTRUST serves about five million plan participants through 3,000 retirement plans. CAPTRUST is one of the largest OCIO providers in the United States, with USD$209 billion in outsourced assets under management.

CAPTRUST Financial Advisors was founded in 1997 with an initial asset base of approximately USD$400 million. As of June 2025, CAPTRUST reported USD$1trillion in total client assets and employed approximately 1,900 people.

== Business model and philosophy ==
At its inception in 1997, the firm introduced the “No-Golf-Ball Rule,” which prohibits advisors from accepting gifts of any kind, “not even a golf ball.” This policy aims to reinforce the firm’s commitment to act as a fiduciary for each client, ensuring no conflicts of interest arise during the advisement process.

CAPTRUST’s “One Brick at a Time” approach reflects the belief that growth is built one client, one colleague and one relationship at a time. “We’re all building something together,” says Michael E. Hudson, principal and head of retirement plan consulting, noting that the firm’s retention rate, which it has been tracking for 25 years, was 98.2% in November 2025.

CAPTRUST also introduced a broad-based equity model in 2002, which gives employees an ownership stake in the firm. “My philosophy has always been the more people we have walking the halls and thinking and acting like owners, the more successful we’re going to be,” says CEO and founding partner Fielding Miller.

== Awards and rankings ==
The firm was listed as one of Triangle Business Journal’s 2024 “Best Places to Work” in Raleigh and Durham. Financial Advisor magazine listed CAPTRUST at number one on its 2025 RIA Ranking of financial firms in the asset category of “1 billion and over.” CAPTRUST was also named to Crisil Coalition Greenwich’s list of Best Investment Consultants of 2025.
