= 333 Fayetteville Street =

Building in North Carolina, United States

Coordinates: 35.7757°N 78.6390°W

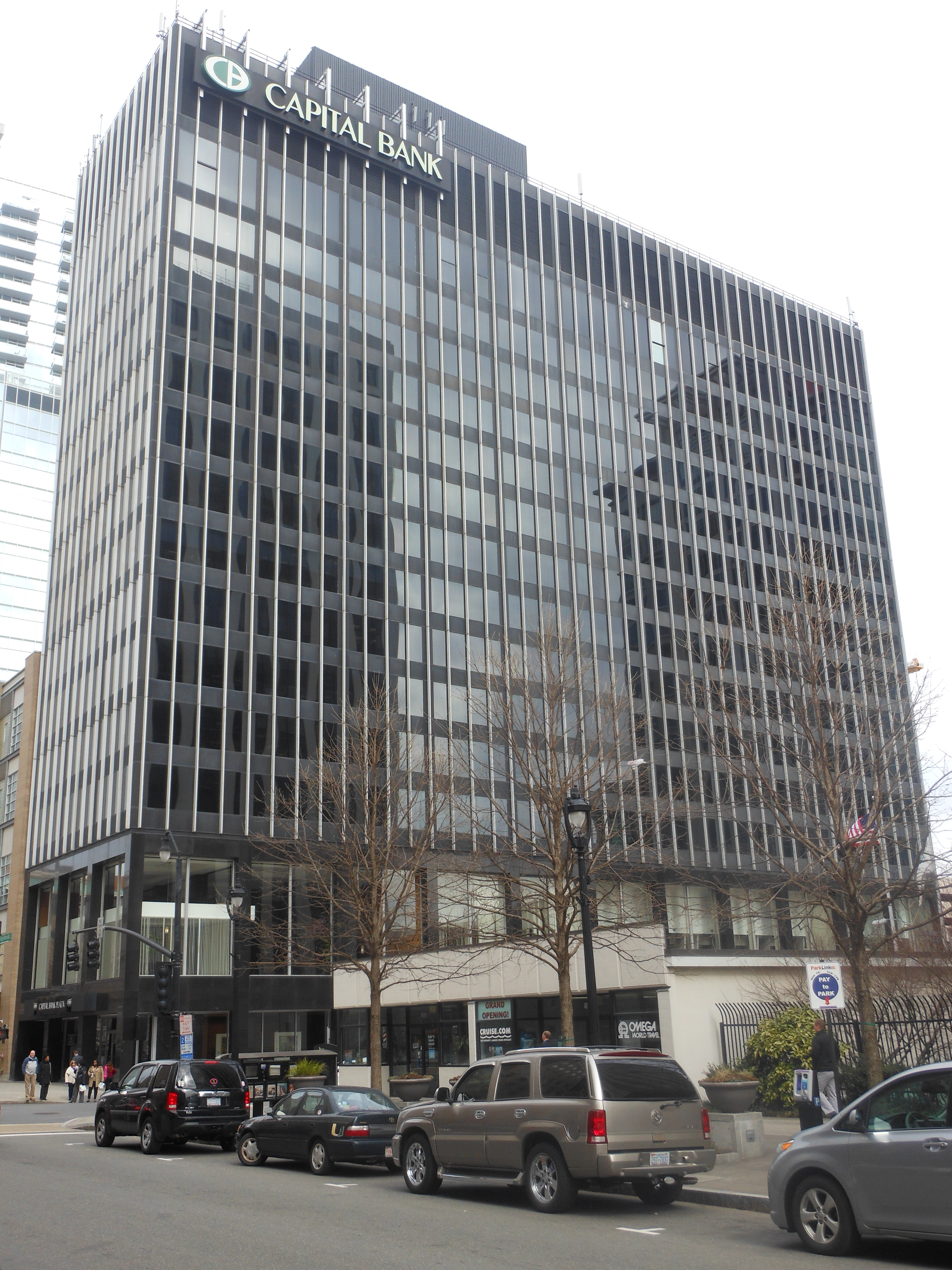
Capital Bank Plaza in Downtown Raleigh, NC

333 Fayetteville Street is a skyscraper in Raleigh, North Carolina which houses the headquarters of Capital Bank. Formerly known as 333 Corporate Plaza and Capital Bank Plaza, the 15-story building at 333 Fayetteville Street has 135,000 square feet (12,500 m^{2}) of space and is an "outstanding example of International Style modernism" and "features black granite on the facade with polished green marble, black granite, and cherry paneling in the lobby."

Emery Roth designed the building, built in 1964. From the 1960s until 1990, the building housed the Raleigh offices of BB&T. The Equitable Life Assurance Society, which had owned the building since 1980, began a $4 million renovation in 1993, and renamed the building 333 Corporate Plaza. KB Fund IV of California bought the building in 1997 and sold it to Modern Continental of Cambridge, Massachusetts in 2000. Raleigh Development bought the building in 2004, and McKinney & Silver soon left its 40,000 square feet (3,700 m^{2}) to move to Durham. On November 2, 2005, Capital Bank announced plans to move to five floors in the building and rename it Capital Bank Center, putting the bank's name on top. The move gave downtown Raleigh its first bank headquarters since First Citizens moved to a suburban location 15 years earlier. In 2021, four years after Capital Bank was acquired by First Horizon Bank, the company's naming rights terminated and the building was renamed to its street address.

Capital Bank announced it would lease two floors of the ten-story One Glenwood in Raleigh. The lease included a sign on the building.
