= PNC Plaza (Raleigh) =

Skyscraper in Raleigh, North Carolina

Coordinates: 35.7767°N 78.6387°W

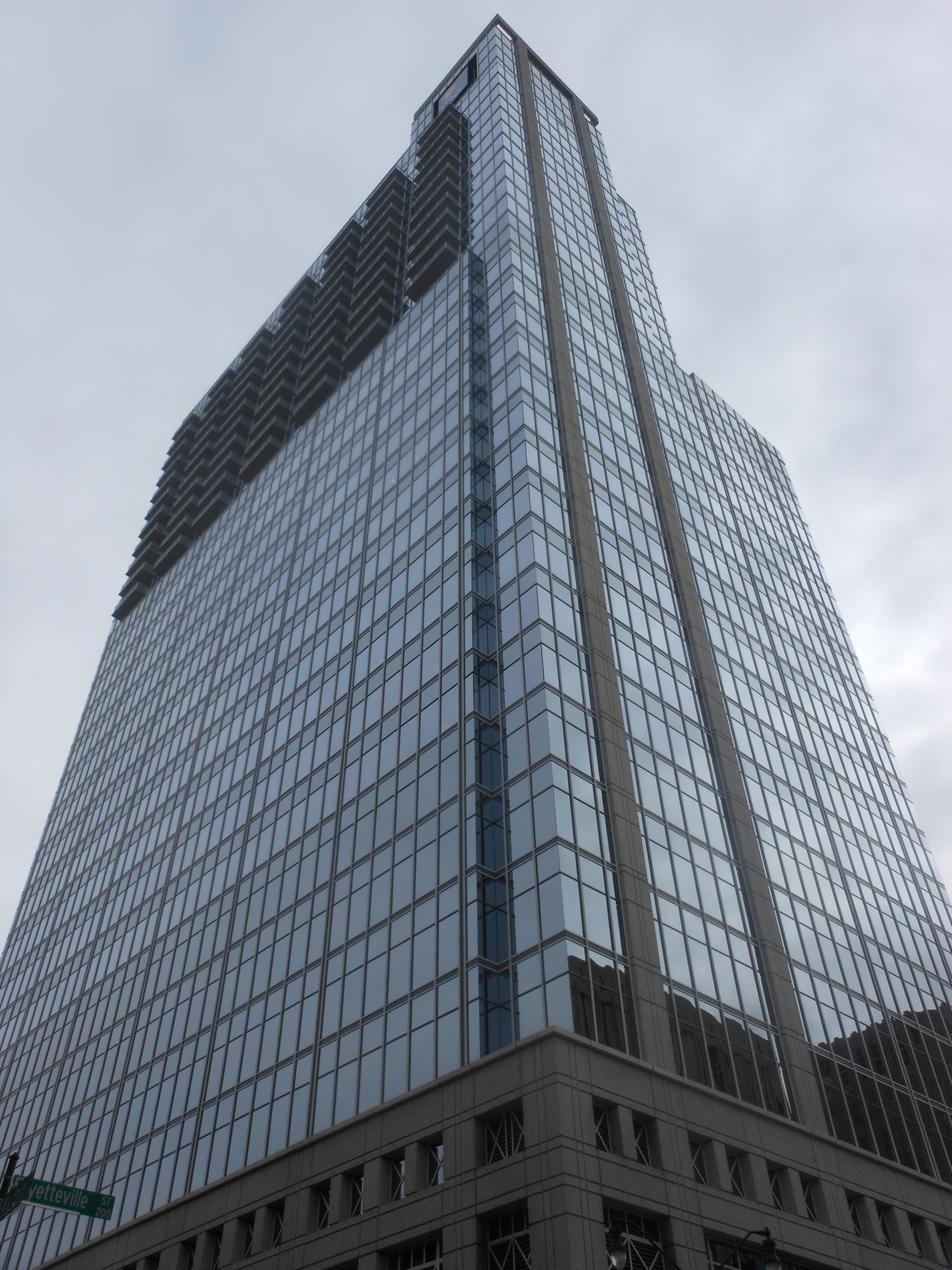
- Interactive map of the PNC Plaza area

General information
- Status: Completed
- Type: Office, Retail, Residence
- Location: Fayetteville Street; Raleigh, North Carolina, United States
- Completed: 2008

Height
- Top floor: 538 ft (164 m)

Technical details
- Floor count: 33
- Floor area: 729,998 sq ft (67,819.0 m^{2})

Design and construction
- Architect: Cooper Carry

PNC Plaza, formerly known as RBC Plaza, is the largest and tallest skyscraper in the city of Raleigh, North Carolina, United States. The 33-story tower rises to a height of 538 feet (164 m) and is situated on a 0.83-acre (3,400 m^{2}) lot housing approximately 730,000 square feet (68,000 m^{2}) of office and retail space, parking and residential condominiums.

== Location and original purpose ==
The building is at the corner of Fayetteville Street, Martin Street, and Wilmington Street served as corporate headquarters for RBC Bank (formerly RBC Centura), the U.S. banking arm of Royal Bank of Canada, before being bought by PNC Financial Services in 2011. Subsequently, it was renamed as PNC Plaza in early 2012. This is also the tallest tower in North Carolina outside of Charlotte, the largest city in the state.

RBC Centura had been courted for years by cities across the East Coast to move its headquarters from Rocky Mount, and in August 2005, CEO Scott Custer announced the bank's intentions to relocate to downtown Raleigh. RBC wanted a tall building that would add to the Raleigh skyline, but the bank needed only 130,000 square feet (12,000 m^{2}) of office space, enough to fill about five floors of an office building. So, Highwoods partnered with Dominion Partners of Raleigh to build 139 residential condos on top of the office building, enough to stretch the building to 33 floors and make it taller than any other office building in the Triangle.

== Building use and facilities ==
All of the PNC Plaza condominiums sold out in August 2008, less than three months after Dominion started taking non-refundable deposits on the units, which ranged in price from $230,000 to $800,000. There are separate lobbies for the office tenants and the residential tenants, a rooftop swimming pool for residents, and a second parking garage with 1,050 spaces across the street. The building has a floor area of 278,208 square feet (25,846.4 m^{2}) of office space on 11 floors, of which 65 percent is leased to RBC Centura and Raleigh law firm Poyner & Spruill.

In September 2009, the Raleigh office of the Williams Mullen law firm moved into 62,500 square feet (5,810 m^{2}) of office space, located on floors 15, 16 and 17 of the RBC Plaza. The facility also has 17,000 square feet (1,600 m^{2}) of street-level retail and seven floors of parking.

== See also ==
- List of tallest buildings in Raleigh
- List of tallest buildings in North Carolina
