= Fayetteville Street (Raleigh) =

Street in Raleigh, North Carolina, United States

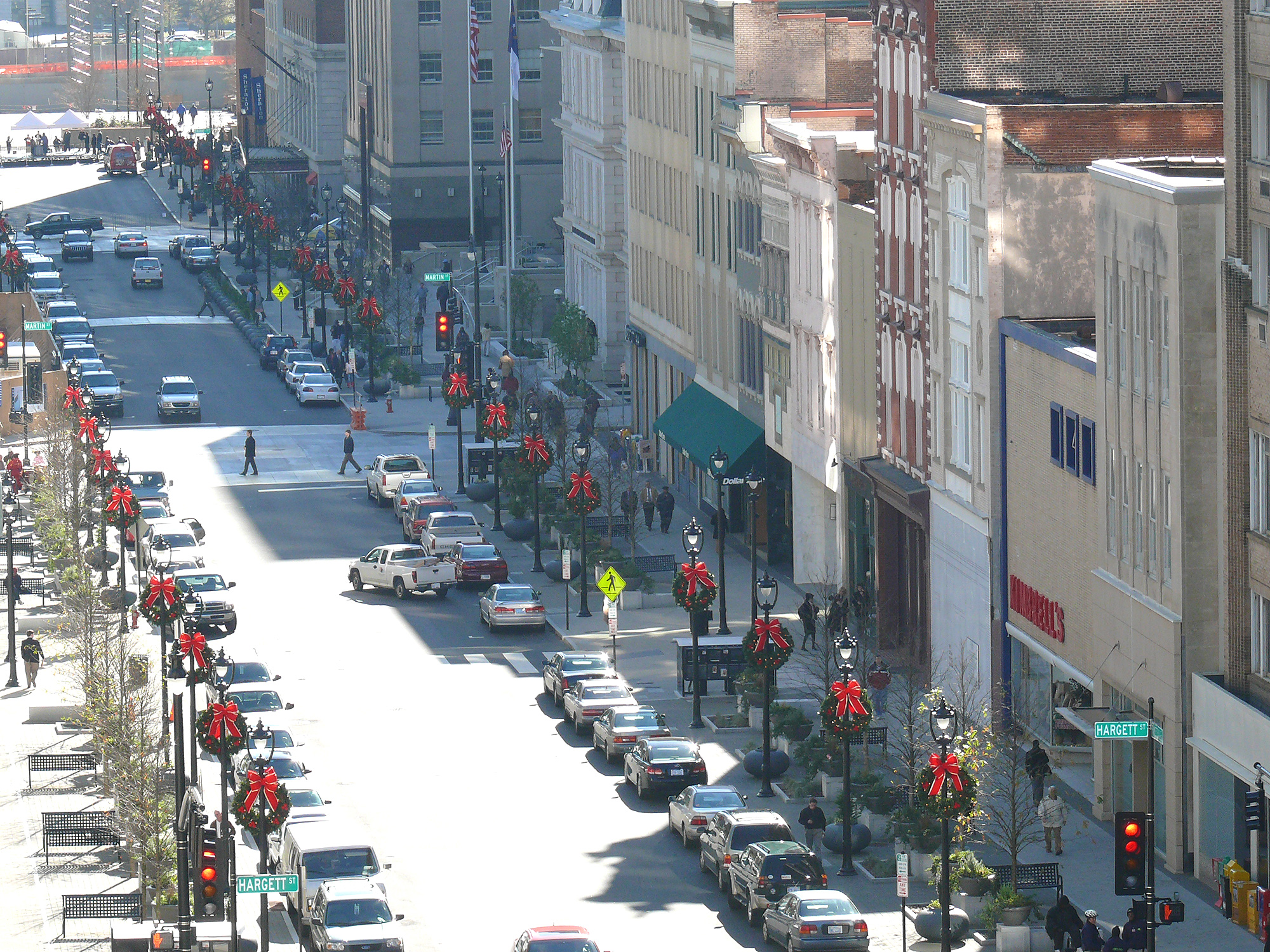
Fayetteville Street

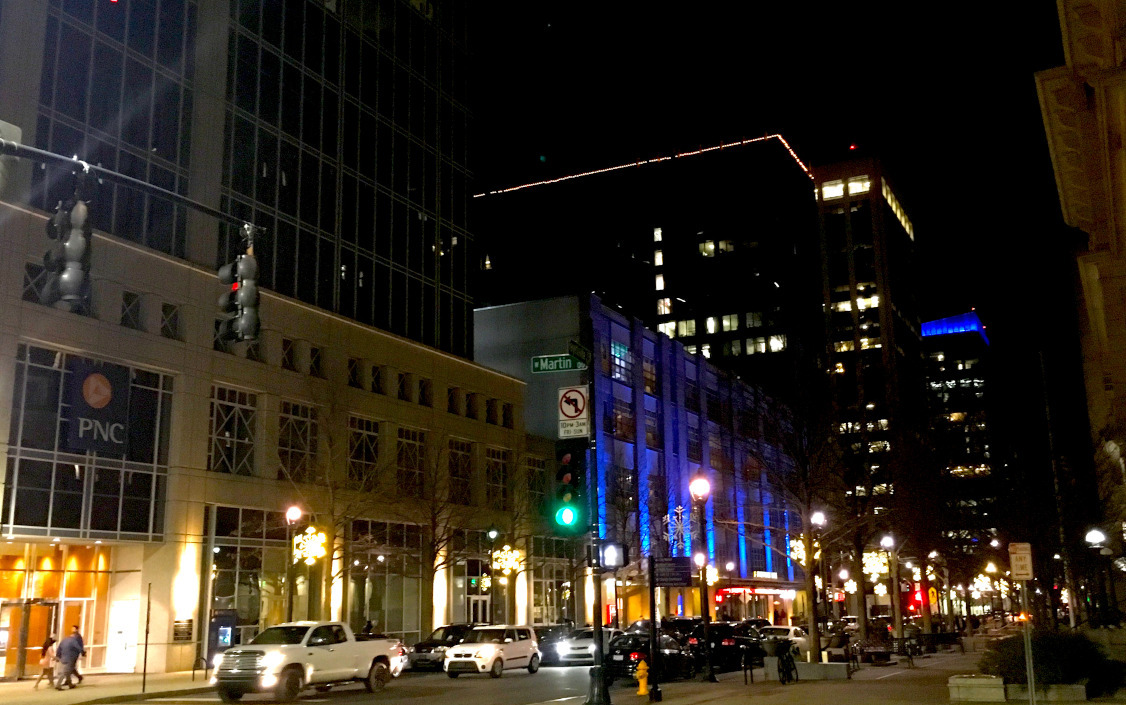
Fayetteville Street in Raleigh, NC at Night. Photo taken December 2019.

Fayetteville Street is a major street in downtown Raleigh, North Carolina, United States of America. It is a north-south thoroughfare that connects the State Capitol to the Raleigh Convention Center and the Progress Energy Center for the Performing Arts. It is the City of Raleigh's ceremonial center, hosting parades, special events, and seasonal celebrations.

In the 2000s, an effort by the Downtown Raleigh Alliance was made to separate downtown Raleigh into five smaller districts: Fayetteville Street, Moore Square, Glenwood South, Warehouse (Raleigh), and Capital District (Raleigh). The Fayetteville Street district is home to a variety of downtown Raleigh businesses, shops, restaurants, bars, and other attractions, as well as government buildings and offices.

== History ==
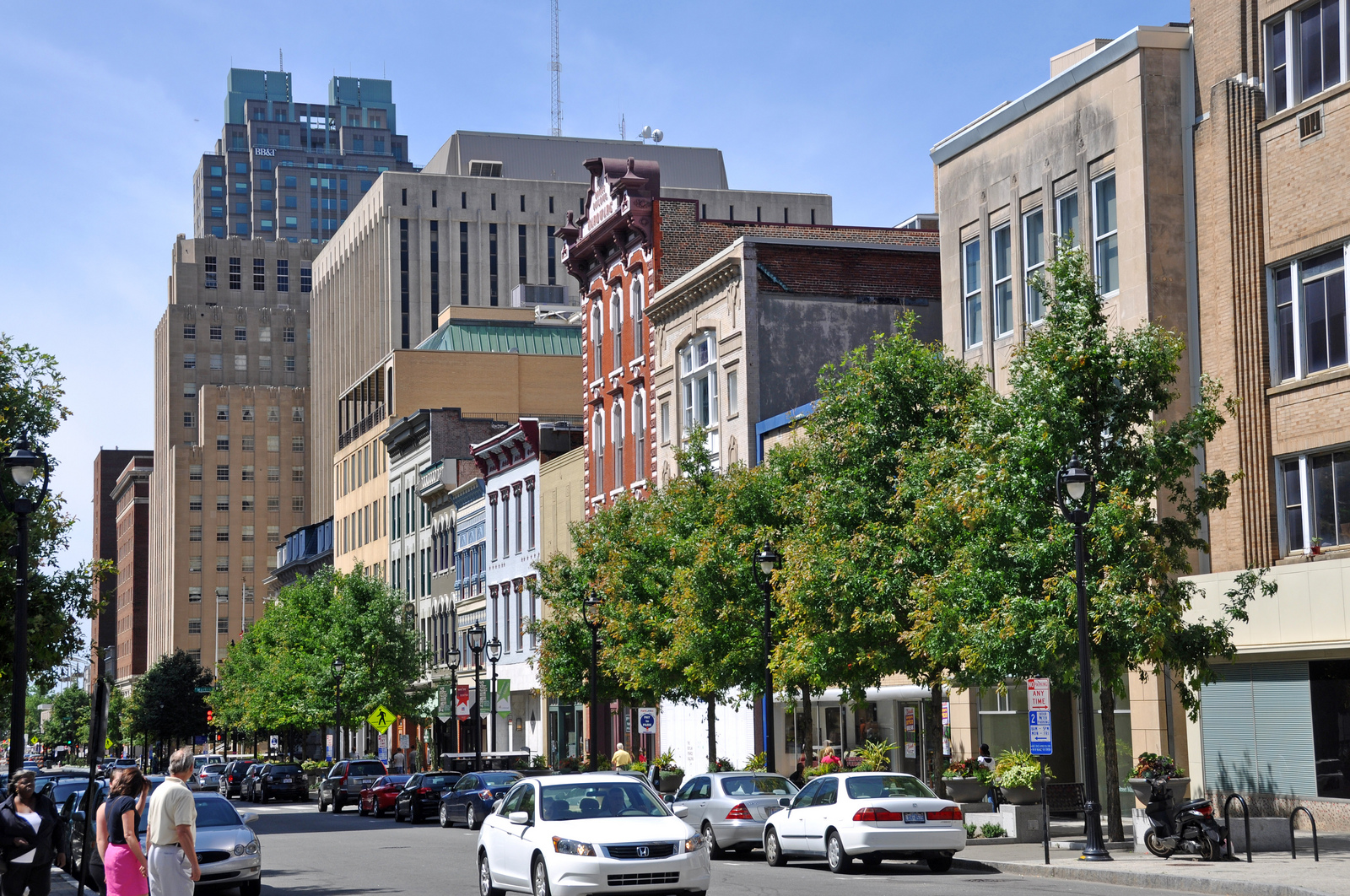
Fayetteville Street in downtown Raleigh, North Carolina

Fayetteville Street was the main thoroughfare south of the state capitol in the early 20th century, but by the 1950s, parallel streets had become more heavily traveled. In 1977, the street was closed to vehicular traffic and converted to a pedestrian mall in an attempt to revitalize the downtown area. It was returned to vehicular traffic in 2006, in a renewed and more successful revitalization effort. In 2008, the Fayetteville Street Historic District was listed on the National Register of Historic Places. Fayetteville was named to honor General Lafayette. On May 30, 2020, during the George Floyd protests in Raleigh protesters marched up Fayetteville Street. Later in the day, the protests turned violent and many storefronts along Fayetteville Street were vandalized.

== Celebrations ==
Fayetteville Street hosts the annual Holidays Parade in Raleigh on the Saturday before Thanksgiving Day. The street also plays host to other city-sponsored events such as the City's New Year's Eve celebration called First Night and the Raleigh Wide Open - an annual event celebrating the reopening of the street. Private-sector sponsored events also draw spectators to the City's ceremonial core: Brewgaloo, Hopscotch Music Festival, Downtown Raleigh Food Truck Rodeo, SPARKcon, Pickin' In The Plaza, etc.

== Attractions ==
- North Carolina State Capitol
- City of Raleigh Museum
- North Carolina Museum of Natural Sciences
- North Carolina Museum of History
- PNC Plaza
- Wake County Courthouse
- WTVD-TV studios (ABC)
- Raleigh Convention Center
- Central Station, Post Office
- Progress Energy Center for the Performing Arts
- Element Plant-Based Gastropub
