= Morgan London Latta =

African American educator (1853–1937)

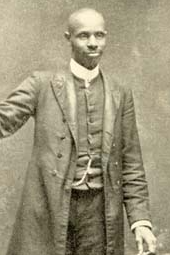
- Born: April, 1853; Wake County, North Carolina, US
- Died: April 13, 1937; Salem, Massachusetts, US
- Resting place: Eden Cemetery (Collingdale, Pennsylvania)
- Education: Shaw University
- Occupations: Minister, teacher, and school administrator
- Known for: Fraud involving Latta University

Morgan London Latta (April 1853 – April 13, 1937) was an African American educator who operated a fraudulent scheme to solicit and misappropriate funds. He founded Latta University in Raleigh, North Carolina and used it to exploit the goodwill of Northern donors during the post-Reconstruction era. Despite being exposed for his criminal misconduct, which brought an end to his school and standing, Latta's legacy continues to be commemorated in Raleigh as a pioneer in Black education.

== Early life ==
According to his largely discredited autobiography, Morgan London Latta was born into slavery in April 1853, at Fishdam, a Cameron/Mordecai plantation where the current Falls Lake Reservoir is located. After being emancipated at the age of nine, he reportedly supported himself and thirteen family members by running their sharecropping business during the day and studying at night.

At the age of fifteen, Latta said he enrolled at Shaw University, receiving a classical education and earning his teaching certificate. He also said that he taught for many years near his home while starting his family and becoming a reverend. In addition to occasionally working as a teacher, Morgan Latta held various jobs, including selling sewing machines and canvassing for the proposed Lynchburg and Durham Railroad. In January 1887, he was arrested after forging a signature on a petition for a teaching job in the Neuse District of Raleigh.

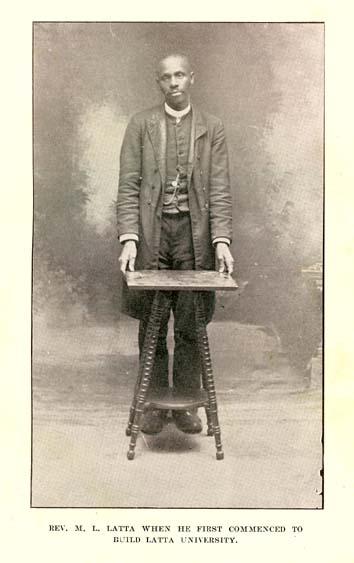
Rev. Morgan Latta

== Latta University ==
Latta founded Latta University in Oberlin Village, an antebellum enclave established by free Blacks in West Raleigh. Latta University received its official incorporation on February 15, 1894, following the acquisition of land in Oberlin Village and fundraising efforts to finance its construction, a process spanning three years. Latta traveled across the North, making speeches and fundraising for the university .

=== Community backlash ===
His neighbors in the Oberlin community were outspoken about Latta; three years before the university's official founding, they published a signed letter on the front page of Raleigh's largest Black newspaper, disassociating themselves from his project. In the letter, they referred to him as a "so-called" professor and were the first to publicly cast doubt on his intentions and credibility. Latta expressed disdain for the Oberlin residents, describing them as “rude, obnoxious, and indolent” or “officious and detestable.” Ultimately, the residents succeeded in dissociating the community's name from Latta's fraudulent activities, he even strikes it from his book entirely, saying the university is located “in West Raleigh, NC.”

Wake County’s official history, authored by Elizabeth Reid Murray, characterizes Latta as “a real crook.” and shares interviews with Oberlin residents conducted by Shaw University Professor Wilmoth Carter:

“He started the place at a time when people were really giving to Negro education, so he raised a lot of money but it didn’t go into any school. Nobody cared enough about what he was doing to stop him; they just ignored him and his efforts.”

The full quote from Carter's interview, which is available in her book The Urban Negro in the South is particularly damning

“Latta’s University was all bogus, it wasn’t even a good primary school. . . he only had two wooden buildings and they weren’t even good barns. The three or four students he had were members of his own family. He hardly had a fifth grade education himself.”

=== Claims of fraud ===
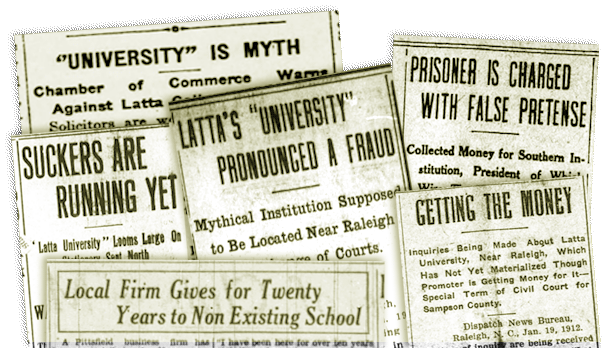

==== Phelps Stokes Fund ====
In 1916, the Phelps-Stokes Fund initiated a comprehensive study of American Black universities under the auspices of the US Department of Education. The study's inaugural chapter shed light on the pervasive issue of "larceny by false pretense", identifying Latta University as the most “flagrant case” they have witnessed. Despite Latta's claims that the university land was neither in his name nor for his benefit, the investigation revealed that the donated land was registered under his wife Laura's name. This is corroborated by Wake County property records showing multiple properties in her name.

==== Philadelphia Charities Bureau ====
In Pennsylvania, Latta targeted middle and upper-class Blacks in the North who were motivated to support their Southern counterparts. In 1916, the Charities Bureau of the Philadelphia Chamber of Commerce conducted an investigation of Latta University. The Chamber's report stated that the university did not function as an educational institution and that the funds raised were not used for their intended purposes. The investigation concluded with a decisive statement that the individuals claiming to represent Latta University were frauds who should be apprehended, noting that the school had once existed but was no longer operational in 1916.

==== Raleigh Chamber of Commerce ====
The Raleigh Chamber of Commerce conducted its own investigation into Morgan London Latta and his university. After receiving inquiries from a Pittsfield, Massachusetts-based company that had been contributing funds to Latta University for over twenty years, the chamber's secretary, H.B. Branch, clarified that Latta University no longer existed and had been defunct for "many, many years." The investigation revealed that Latta University had ceased operations long before the solicitations in question. They determined that Morgan London Latta had misrepresented the existence of the institution to secure donations, often in person. The chamber deemed these fundraising efforts fraudulent and issued warnings to other state chambers of commerce to alert businesses and the public about the scheme. Bulletins and letters were circulated, explicitly advising against providing funds for Latta University.

==== Insurance ====
Latta faced multiple court appearances after his efforts to obtain payouts from insurers were unsuccessful, all due to questions surrounding his claims. He insured his buildings, and over the years, reported that his properties were destroyed by "five different fires and a cyclone". Consequently, Latta University appears on the 1914 Sanborn Fire Insurance map. However, contrary to his claims of having 23 buildings, the survey shows only two large structures and three smaller buildings. Even before the claims of fire and other damages, Latta's photographs of the school only show seventeen buildings, most of which were outbuildings.

=== Closure of Latta University ===
Over the next ten years, Latta's family and associates operating their scam in the North were frequently apprehended. John Bivans and his wife played a key role in Latta's fundraising scheme by soliciting donations under false pretenses. When Bivans was arrested soliciting donations, Latta would wire the police chief, claiming that Bivans had been misappropriating funds and requesting leniency, as Bivans was a cripple. This would result in the donations being sent back to Raleigh, Bivans being released, sometimes the mayor warning him never to return. This pattern is seen repeated in local newspapers for years across towns in Massachusetts, Pennsylvania, and New York. In 1916, Bivans was convicted in New York despite Latta's plea for his release. During his trial, Bivans revealed that he was Latta's brother-in-law and acting under Latta's direction. Regardless, Bivans was sent to the penitentiary on Blackwell's Island.

The New York Age, one of the most prominent Black newspapers of its time, published multiple articles condemning Latta University's honorary degree abuse, whereby Latta conferred honorary doctorates for a fee. In 1919, a bill was presented to the North Carolina House to regulate degrees awarded by universities and colleges, specifically targeting diploma mills. When the bill was narrowly defeated, The News & Observer noted that this left "Latta University and its industrious president free to make B.A.’s, B.S.’s, LL.D.’s and D.D.’s of the newly made rich in the metropolis."

Latta University officially closed on paper in 1922, as Latta sold off land to pay debts and sold the deed to the school. The remaining land was sold in 1929, except for a small parcel that included his house. The family was last listed in Oberlin on the 1930 census, where Latta no longer described himself as a professor but as a preacher. In 1933, his final parcel of land, including his home, was foreclosed and sold at auction to cover his debts.

== Autobiography and fundraising ==
Latta's autobiography, History of My Life and Work, was published in 1903. In his book, African Americans in the Post-Emancipation South, Alton Hornsby Jr. (Note: During his forty-two-year tenure at Morehouse College (1968-2010), Alton Hornsby Jr. chaired the history department for thirty consecutive years (1971-2001) and held the Fuller E. Callaway Professor of History title from 1996. He was inducted into Phi Beta Kappa in 1984 and won numerous awards, including the 2012 John W. Blassingame Award. Hornsby was a leading scholar in African American history, notably serving as president of the Southern Conference on African American Studies (1986-1988) and editing the Journal of Negro History (1976-2001). He also established the Lillie M. Newton Hornsby Award in 1995.) details how Latta used his autobiography to swindle donors to Latta University.

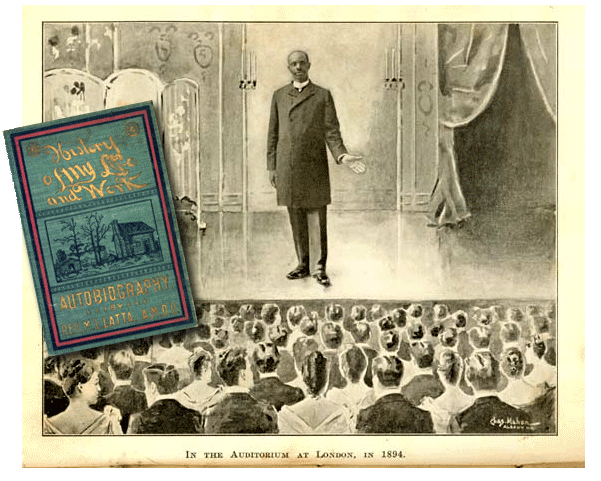

Harry Morgan, in Historical Perspectives on the Education of Black Children, describes Latta as an "outstanding example" of fraud and highlights the dubious nature of Latta's operations at the time the book was published:

[Latta] constructed what could only be described as a shack and went on a tour of the North to solicit funds for the “university”. At a time when Latta had one teacher and a few pupils, the founder and president published a 400-page book extolling the virtues of his institution as having 400 students and an elaborate campus.

In his autobiography, Latta exaggerated the scale and success of his university, claiming it had 23 buildings and accommodated over 1400 students. The book included many photos of students, yet none showed more than thirty individuals. Additionally, the school's records did not support the number of students he claimed.

In the book, Latta fabricated stories of traveling to Europe and consorting with Queen Victoria, who he claimed pledged to grant him an entire province if he requested it. Julian Street describes multiple photographs as "made-up", such as the illustration above of him speaking "in the Auditorium at London." During a 1908 insurance trial, Latta admitted that these speaking engagement images were taken at a Philadelphia photography studio.

Latta asserted that his university was "one of the largest schools in the South in every respect." Street notes that to support this, he took pictures of the same buildings from different angles, labeling them as different structures: "Similar artfulness is shown in pictures of the university buildings, where the same frame structure, photographed from opposite ends, appears in one case as, Young Ladies' Dormitory, and in the other as, Chapel and Young Men's Dormitory."

Despite numerous primary accounts and documents revealing his autobiography to be false, it played a crucial role in his fundraising efforts and, decades later, in establishing his legacy.

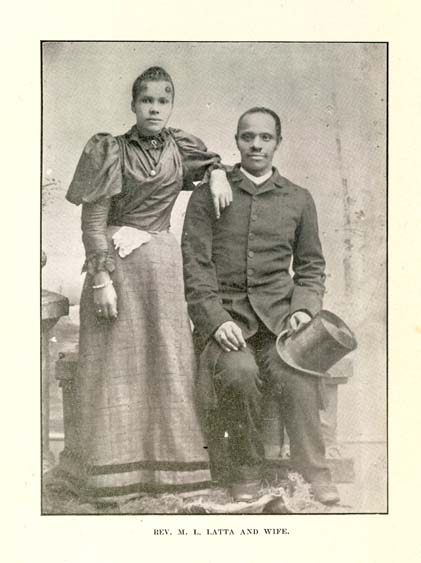
Laura and Morgan Latta

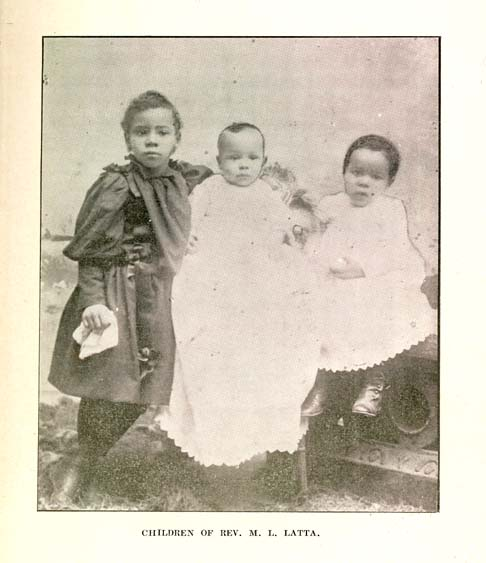
Latta's children

== Personal life ==
Latta procured a license to marry Eliza Evans on February 7, 1885. It remains unclear what transpired, as a year later he married student Laura Bivens. Records indicate that they lived together in Oberlin Village from 1889 through 1929. They had ten children, Marie Latta, Morgan L. Latta Jr., James L. Latta, Laura Latta, Moses Latta, Jessie Latta, Nellie Latta, Zacharia Latta, Clementine Latta, and Ediith Latta.|

In the late 1920s, Latta sold and foreclosed on his land in West Raleigh. Latta died on April 13, 1937, in Salem, Massachusetts. He was interred on April 17 at Eden Cemetery in Collingdale, Pennsylvania in Lehman 113, plot 28. His obituary does not mention Latta University or identify him as an educator.

== Controversial views ==
Latta's political views were a source of significant controversy and criticism, particularly from prominent Black leaders. In her book The Urban Negro of the South, Dr. Wilmoth Carter (Note: Dr. Wilmoth Annette Carter studied under W.E.B. Dubois at Atlanta University and received her doctorate from the University of Chicago in 1959. A sociologist widely recognized in her field, she authored numerous books, and held the position of Vice President of Academic Affairs at Shaw University.) highlights that Latta's acceptance by whites and rejection by Blacks were due to his corrosive views. He largely blamed lynchings on the Black victims— claiming so much widespread "ignorance among the colored people that such extreme depredations as assaulting white ladies of the South takes place".

=== Racial inferiority ===
"The white man of the South is the best friend the negro has, if he behaves himself, and does not try to rule the country, because as I say [blacks] are not competent."

— M.L. Latta, "Cannot Govern Themselves". The News and Observer. January 25, 1900. p. 5.

Latta publicly expressed that Blacks were generally ignorant and lacked ambition, stating "Our race is ignorant, as a rule, with few exceptions. The colored people, as a race, don’t seem to have much ambition about them." He often described Blacks as a "weak' race, and believed that Blacks were uncivilized and inferior, advocating that they should be submissive and deferential to whites, whom he regarded as "more capable men".

In his writings, Latta praised prominent white supremacists who supported his endeavors. This included public commendations for figures like Charles Brantley Aycock and Josephus Daniels, despite their significant roles in advancing Jim Crow segregation and disfranchisement in North Carolina. Such endorsements, given their contentious actions, ignited fury and condemnation within the Black community.

=== Opposition to political engagement ===
Latta opposed Black political participation, he frequently preached that, "The colored people should take no part in politics and leave it to more capable men". He proclaimed that there was “nothing in politics for colored people” and urged African Americans to “get religion, educate themselves, buy property, stay out of politics, and put money in the bank."

Latta regularly used his community of Oberlin Village as an example of why he believed Blacks "are not sufficient to govern themselves." Given all of the above, he attributed the resistance he faced from Black communities to "ignorance, prejudice, and jealousy."

== Legacy ==
=== Raleigh's commemoration ===
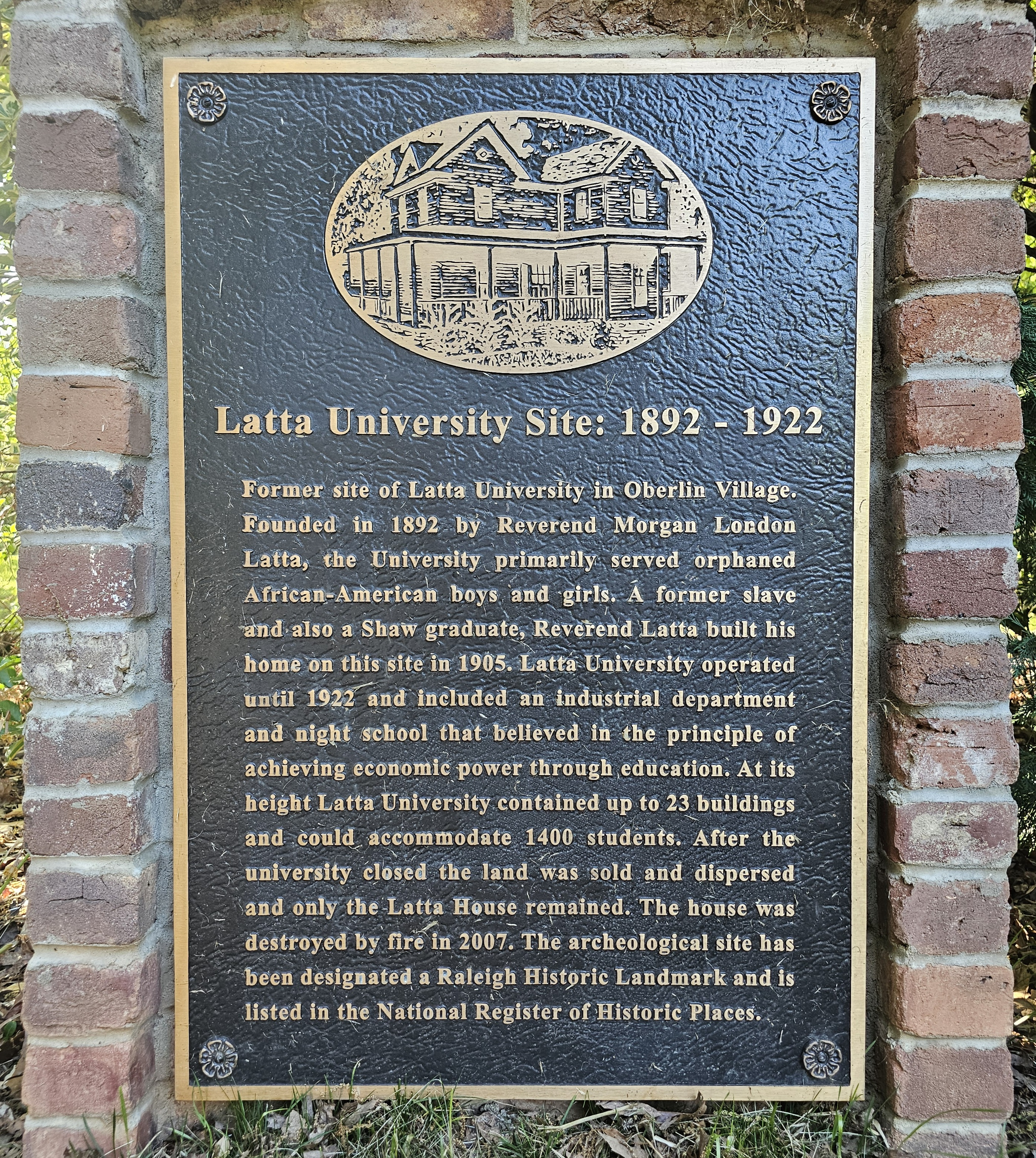
Historical Marker at Latta university Historic Park

The commemoration of Latta by the City of Raleigh has sparked debate regarding the reliance on his autobiography as the primary narrative of his legacy. Historians have highlighted that his autobiography, which served as a tool in his fraudulent activities, contains numerous discrepancies and false or exaggerated claims about his achievements. Multiple contemporary investigations pronounced Latta and his university a fraud, and he, along with at least one co-conspirator, were jailed for fraud, further casting doubt on the credibility of this narrative.

In 2019, Morgan Latta was inducted into the Raleigh Hall of Fame stating "Reverend Latta’s history and legacy continues to inspire children from all backgrounds through programming by the City of Raleigh and the Latta House Foundation." In 2014, the City of Raleigh Museum hosted the exhibit “Latta’s Living Legacy”, which displayed an original copy of his autobiography as well as some items from the archeological excavation.

==== Latta University Historic Park ====
In April 2024, Raleigh completed the Latta University Historic Park, an US$800,000 project featuring interpretive signage, bronze historical markers, and educational materials for schools. These materials rely on Latta's autobiography as a primary source.

The Latta House Foundation, a nonprofit organization which includes descendants of Latta on its board, has the mission of "promoting the history of Latta and his university". The Foundation's board members served on the citizen planning board for the Latta University Historic Park Master Plan and collaborated with the City of Raleigh Parks, Recreation and Cultural Resources Department for a public program.

=== Historic designations ===
Latta's home received the designation of a Raleigh Historic Landmark and was listed in the National Register of Historic Places. This recognition has relied in part on his autobiography and its descriptions of Latta University.

== See also ==
- Oberlin Village
