= Mynor Escobar =

Guatemalan architect, visual artist, painter and writer

- Born: June 10, 1964 (age 62)
- Citizenship: Guatemalan
- Education: Universidad de San Carlos de Guatemala
- Occupation: Visual Artist Architect
- Movement: Latin American Figurativism
- Website: www.mynorescobar.com

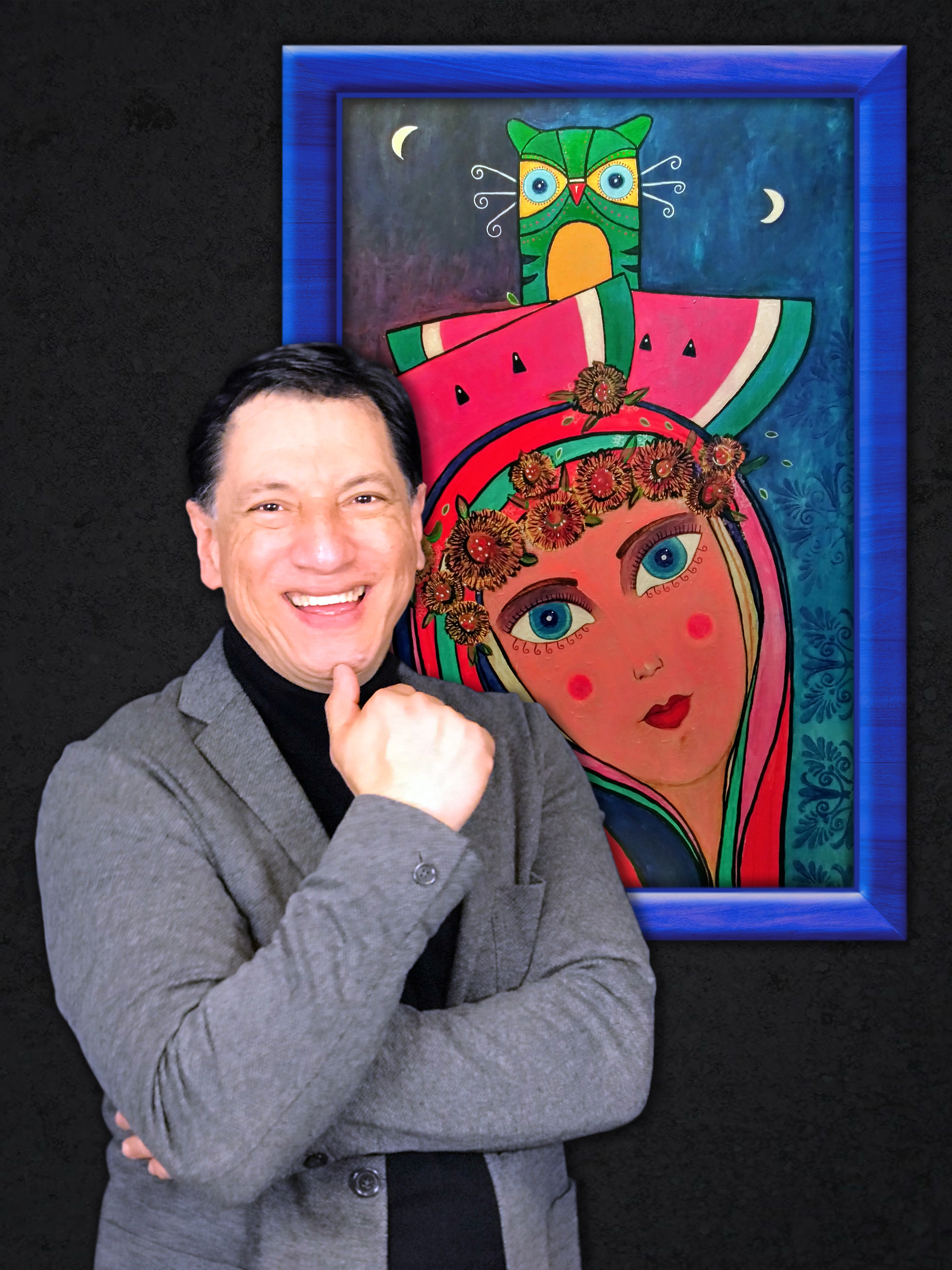

Mynor Haroldo Escobar Espinoza (born June 10, 1964), professionally known as Mynor Escobar, is a Guatemalan architect, visual artist, painter, and writer.

Escobar is best known for his long-running pictorial series TUKUR. He is the author of the books Blue Eyes (poetry), Versus and Other Tales, and Stories of a Tukur.

His book Historias de un Tukur was presented in an online event in Guatemala in January 2023.

== Early life and education ==
Escobar was born on June 10, 1964, in Guatemala, Central America, to Alfredo Escobar Rivera and Zulma Lili Espinoza Martínez. He has two siblings, Rodmy and Avalesca.

After graduating from Colegio Marista Liceo Coatepeque, in 1982 he began studying architecture at the University of San Carlos de Guatemala, where he earned a bachelor's degree.

In 2008, Escobar earned a Bachelor’s degree in Visual Arts from the Escuela Superior de Arte of the Universidad de San Carlos de Guatemala through the PLART program (Programa Universitario de Promoción y Graduación para Artistas con Trayectoria Profesional). The program was designed for artists with more than twenty years of documented professional experience. Escobar was part of the first cohort of graduates, following a selection process initiated in 2006. He later served as a professor and coordinator within the Visual Arts degree program at the same institution.

== Career ==
In 1994, Escobar was selected as part of Jóvenes Valores de la Plástica Guatemalteca (1994), one of Guatemala’s most significant recognition platforms for emerging visual artists since its establishment in 1980. That edition marked the final cohort organized under the legacy of artist Víctor Vásquez Kléster, whose initiative played a formative role in the development of contemporary Guatemalan plastic arts.

Escobar has worked as a university professor, advertising creative, cultural promoter, radio producer, and visual artist. From 2009 to 2011, he created and produced the cultural radio program La Galería, broadcast on Radio Universidad 92.1 FM.

In 2007, Escobar was awarded the Artista del Año distinction by Fundación G&T Continental and the Asociación Artista del Año in Guatemala.

In 2016, Escobar participated in the cultural project Teco Arte, promoted by Banco Industrial, in which 22 Guatemalan artists created monumental works representing the country’s cultural identity. His work was included in the collective publication Teco Arte Guatemala, which documents the project through artists’ testimonies and visual records.

In 2020, his work was featured at the 23rd Historic Center Festival of Guatemala City through the short film Mynor Escobar, Discovering Tukur.

In 2023, the Matices Cultural Center and the Embassy of Panama in Guatemala honored him in recognition of his more than 40-year career in the visual arts.

In 2024 and 2025, Escobar participated in the literary event Boleros y Libros, held at the City of Raleigh Museum.

In April 2025, Escobar illustrated the bilingual children’s book Wepa Wepa Quenepa, written by Rafael A. Osuba, presented at the Biblioteca Juvenil de Mayagüez, Puerto Rico, during the Festival del Quixote.

Escobar participated in the 8th Annual Literary Gathering in 2024 and the 9th Annual Literary Gathering, Atrévete a soñar en grande / Dare to Dream Big, in 2025 at Queens University of Charlotte.

In September 2026, Escobar was listed as a participating artist in Americanos: Across the Americas / Americanos: Tras las Américas, part of Casa Azul of Greensboro's Arts and Education Series, presented at the African American Atelier in Greensboro, North Carolina.

In September 2026, Escobar was also listed among the authors and illustrators participating in the Cervantino Bilingual Book Fair at the City of Raleigh Museum in Raleigh, North Carolina, as part of the 12th Annual El Quixote Festival.

== Style ==
Escobar is known for his figurative pictorial work, commonly referred to as Tukur Painting, characterized by symbolic imagery, poetic language, and cultural references linked to Guatemalan identity.

His work explores themes of collective memory, cultural identity, and popular symbolism within contemporary Guatemalan art.

Escobar’s pictorial work is characterized by the integration of handwritten poetic text, often incorporated into the composition or along the borders of his paintings. His visual language frequently centers on idealized young female figures, referred to as ishtas in Guatemalan cultural terminology, which function as recurring muses within his personal artistic vocabulary.

== Personal life ==
Escobar is the father of Alessandra, Camila, and Rodrigo.
