= Oberlin Village =

Historic freedmen's settlement in Raleigh, North Carolina, US

Coordinates: 35°47′44″N 78°39′49″W

Oberlin Village is a historic African American community located on the outskirts of Raleigh, North Carolina. Established post-Civil War, the village grew from a small cluster of free Black landowners into a thriving settlement during Reconstruction. The community has been recognized as a Historic Overlay District, and has multiple structures that are on the National Register of Historic Places.

== Early history ==
=== Founding ===
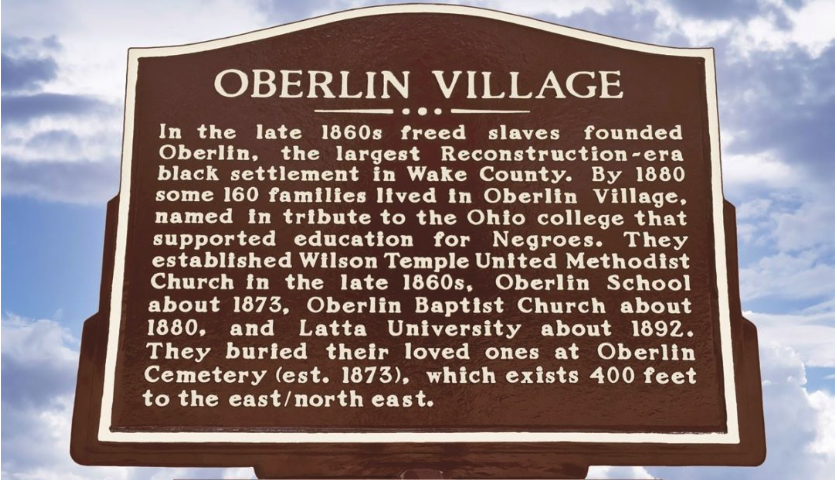

The origins of Oberlin Village trace back to 1858, when Jesse Pettiford, a free Black tenant farmer descended from a Revolutionary War veteran, purchased 16 acres of land along the New Hillsborough Road west of Raleigh. By 1860, Pettiford's family was living on this land, with his son, a railroad foreman, residing in a separate house on the property. Benjamin Morgan, a free Black stonemason, owned a home across the road.

=== Pre-civil war context ===
Before the Civil War, freedom for Pettiford, Morgan, and their neighbors was precarious. The Union victory in the war, however, emancipated those who were enslaved in the surrounding areas and secured the status of free Blacks. This collective freedom enabled the establishment and growth of Oberlin Village during the Reconstruction era.

== Growth and development ==
=== Reconstruction-era expansion ===
From 1868 to 1876, North Carolina's Republican majority encouraged the development of all-Black settlements. This political climate attracted freedmen to the area around New Hillsborough Road, where they purchased land from white landowners and constructed homes. Some of these freedmen financed their investments through the Raleigh Cooperative Land and Building Association, led by Black legislator and developer James Henry Harris.

=== Naming and infrastructure ===
In the early 1870s, to counteract derogatory terms used by whites, the residents named their community Oberlin after Oberlin College in Ohio, which Harris had attended. Beginning in 1865, Black Methodists established a chapel and school. By the mid-1870s, these institutions were situated on land donated by Benjamin Morgan's brother. In 1873, Pettiford's heirs sold an acre of their homestead for the establishment of Oberlin Cemetery, and in 1883, they sold an adjacent acre for a grade school.

=== Community ===
By 1880, Oberlin Village had grown into a bustling community, with around 130 Black households and seven White households. The village primarily attracted artisans and service workers, many of whom commuted to Raleigh for work.

== Historic buildings ==
Oberlin Village was designated a Historic Overlay District of Raleigh to preserve multiple Raleigh Historic Landmarks as well as the character of the historic community.

=== Oberlin Village Historic Overlay District ===
The Oberlin Village Historic Overlay District is the longest-surviving and most intact Reconstruction-Era freedman's colony in both Wake County and North Carolina. Among the three major freedman's colonies in the state—James City, Roanoke Island, and Freedom Hill/Princeville—Oberlin Village stands out for retaining its historical physical character. While James City and Princeville continue to exist as Black communities, they lack recognizable historic districts, and the above-ground remains of the Roanoke Island colony are no longer present.

In Raleigh, five freedman's colonies developed during Reconstruction: Nazareth, Lincolnville, Brooklyn, Method, and Oberlin. Of these, only Oberlin and Method have survived, with Oberlin being the most physically intact. Consequently, the Oberlin Village Historic Overlay District holds significant importance for Raleigh and North Carolina, particularly in the areas of African American history and nineteenth and twentieth-century architecture.

=== Significant structures ===
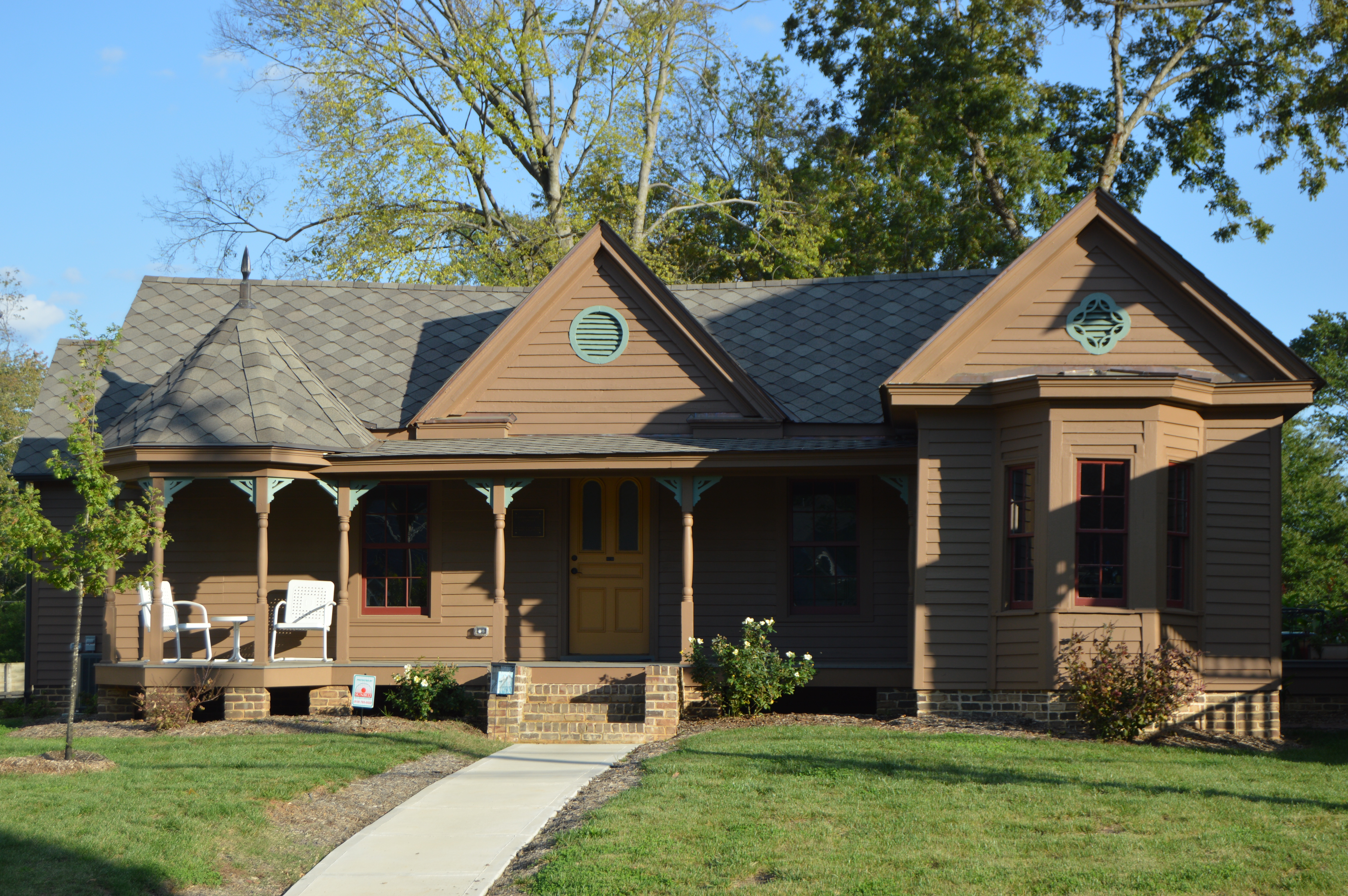
Rev. Plummer T. Hall House

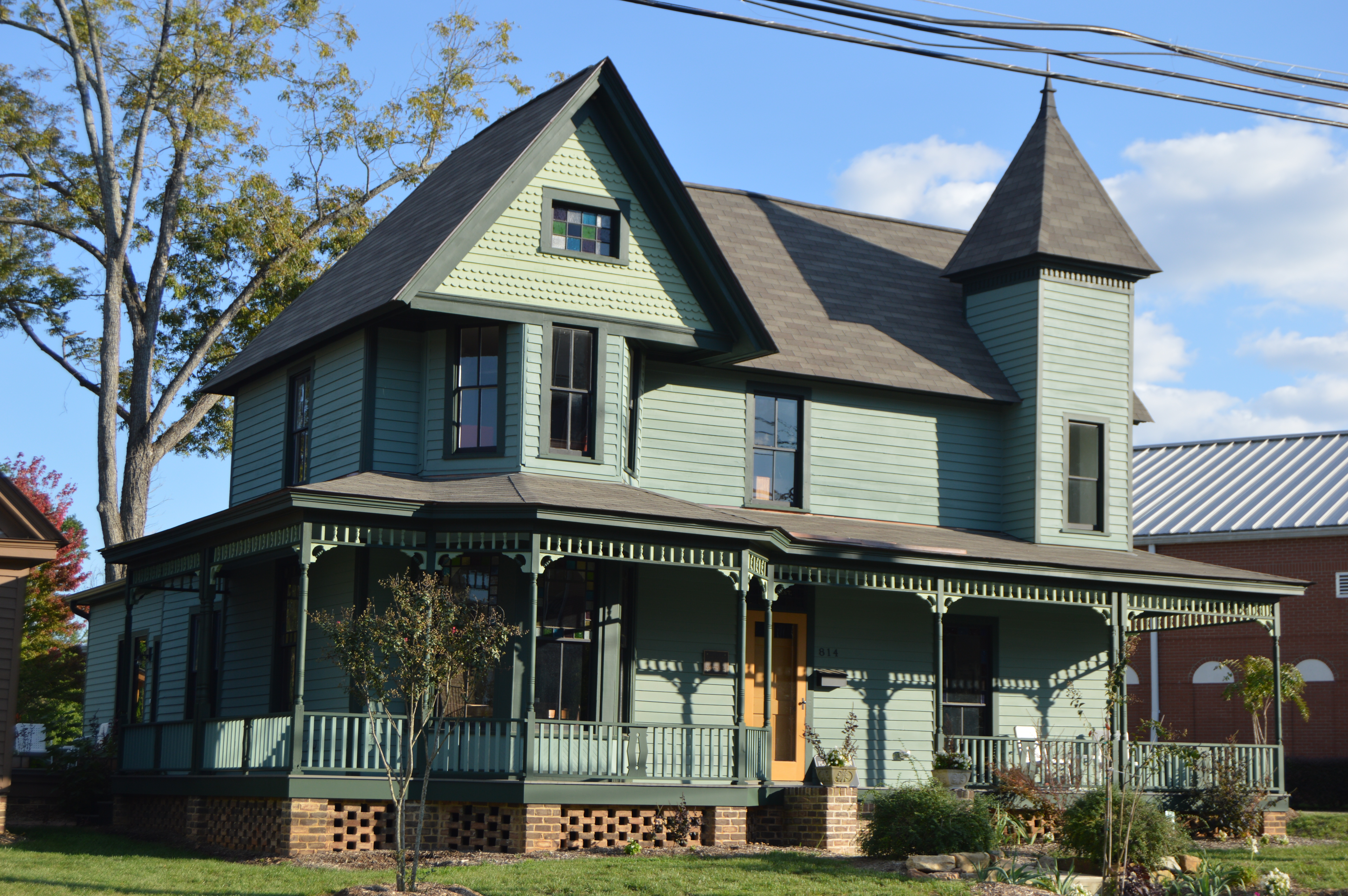
Willis M. Graves House

The most impressive buildings now standing along Oberlin Road date from approximately 1890 to 1911. The Graves, Morgan, and Turner houses on Oberlin Road are particularly notable for their two-story height, which was a rarity for late-nineteenth and early-twentieth-century Black homeowners in and around Raleigh. These larger houses reflect the relative wealth and stature of their owners.

- Rev. Plummer T. Hall's House: Built in 1890, this Queen Anne-style house was a gift from Rev. Hall to his bride, Delia. Rev. Hall, an early resident, preached at an Oberlin church that became known as Hall's Chapel and later as Oberlin Baptist Church.
- Willis Graves House: Built circa 1890, Willis Graves' house is significant not only for its size but also for the multiple business enterprises Graves was involved in. Besides running a grocery store, Graves did masonry and carpentry work.
- James S. Morgan House: Constructed around 1900, this house was built for James S. Morgan, the son of Wilson W. Morgan. Wilson was an early Oberlin settler and a Reconstruction-era politician who also helped found the Colored Educational Association of North Carolina.
- John and Mary Turner House: Around 1910, the Turners expanded their small 1880s house into the most impressive two-story house in the village core. John Turner ran a grocery store and also opened a shoe store on Hargett Street in Raleigh's Black business district.

=== Public buildings ===
The early 1900s saw the replacement of the first frame church sanctuaries and frame school by more permanent and stylish buildings.

- First Baptist Church (Oberlin Baptist Church): In 1896, the Oberlin High School department held its Thanksgiving exercises in this church, highlighting its significance in the community.
- Wilson Temple AME Church: In 1910-11, the congregation built a splendid new brick Gothic Revival-style church on the site of their original frame sanctuary.

== 20th century and beyond ==
=== Annexation and change ===
In 1920, Raleigh annexed Oberlin Village. Since then, the area has undergone significant changes due to economic challenges, urban renewal projects, and ongoing redevelopment, which have altered both its demographics and historic landscape.

=== Present-day Oberlin ===
Today, visitors to Oberlin Village can see several historic sites, including the Oberlin Cemetery, the Wilson Temple United Methodist Church, and the Oberlin Rising Park. These sites are all within a half-mile walk of each other.

== Preservation efforts ==
Oberlin Village, one of North Carolina's last known surviving freedmen's villages, faces significant threats from rapid urban development. Despite its historical significance and designation as part of Raleigh's Historic Overlay District, the village is at risk of losing its cultural heritage due to new construction projects surrounding the area.

Friends of Oberlin Village, a preservation organization, has raised concerns about the ongoing teardown of historic structures. Executive Director Sabrina Goode emphasizes the village's importance as a state landmark that deserves respect and protection. The cemetery, listed on the National Register of Historic Places, remains a key historic site, yet the encroachment of new developments is alarming.

=== Friends of Oberlin Village ===
The Friends of Oberlin Village is a volunteer-based nonprofit organization dedicated to preserving and promoting the history of Oberlin Village. The group collaborates with scholars and preservationists from institutions such as North Carolina State University, William Peace University, and Longview School, as well as organizations like the Raleigh Historic Development Commission and Preservation North Carolina. These partnerships have been instrumental in acquiring, relocating, and renovating key historic properties, including the Plummer T. Hall House and the Willis M. Graves House, both of which are listed on the National Register of Historic Places and are important African American landmarks in Oberlin Village.

== Notable sites ==
=== Oberlin Cemetery ===
Established in 1873 on land sold by the Pettiford family, Oberlin Cemetery is a significant historical site where many of the village's early residents are buried. It is traditionally believed to be located on the site of a former slave graveyard. The cemetery maintains a rural appearance, with a variety of grave markers that include fine marble and granite obelisks as well as plain stone markers without inscriptions. There are also government-issued stones for military veterans. The earliest recorded death date on an inscribed stone in the cemetery is 1876.

=== Wilson Temple United Methodist Church ===
Built on the site of the original chapel founded by Black Methodists in 1865, the Wilson Temple United Methodist Church remains an active place of worship and community gathering.

=== Oberlin Rising Park ===
This park commemorates the history and heritage of Oberlin Village, offering a space for reflection and education about the community's past. The sculptor, Thomas Sayre, intentionally crafted the abstract sculpture to ignite contemplation and introspection. By presenting French-fry-like earthcast obelisks whose connection to the community they commemorate remains elusive, the artwork invites viewers to engage in a dialogue about its meaning and significance. This deliberate ambiguity encourages individuals to ponder the relationship between the form of the sculpture and the community it represents, fostering a deeper understanding and appreciation of both art and community identity.

=== Historic Latta University Park ===
The property encompasses the remaining land of Latta University, founded in 1892, as well as the site of the former Latta residence, which was destroyed by fire in 2007. Rev. Morgan Latta, a formerly enslaved person and educator, established the university purportedly to educate underprivileged and orphaned children in Raleigh's Black community. However, investigations, documents and first hand accounts have shown that Latta University was largely a fraudulent endeavor. Despite significant opposition from the Oberlin community, who detested Latta, the City of Raleigh continues to commemorate him through Latta University Park. This has sparked controversy, as many criticize the city's decision to celebrate a figure with such a dubious legacy.

=== Isabelle Bowen Henderson House and Gardens ===
The Isabelle Bowen Henderson House and Gardens, once owned by Isabelle Bowen Henderson, is a historic home and garden in the village that was listed on the National Register of Historic Places in 1989.
