= Rev. Plummer T. Hall House =

Historic house in North Carolina, United States

- U.S. National Register of Historic Places
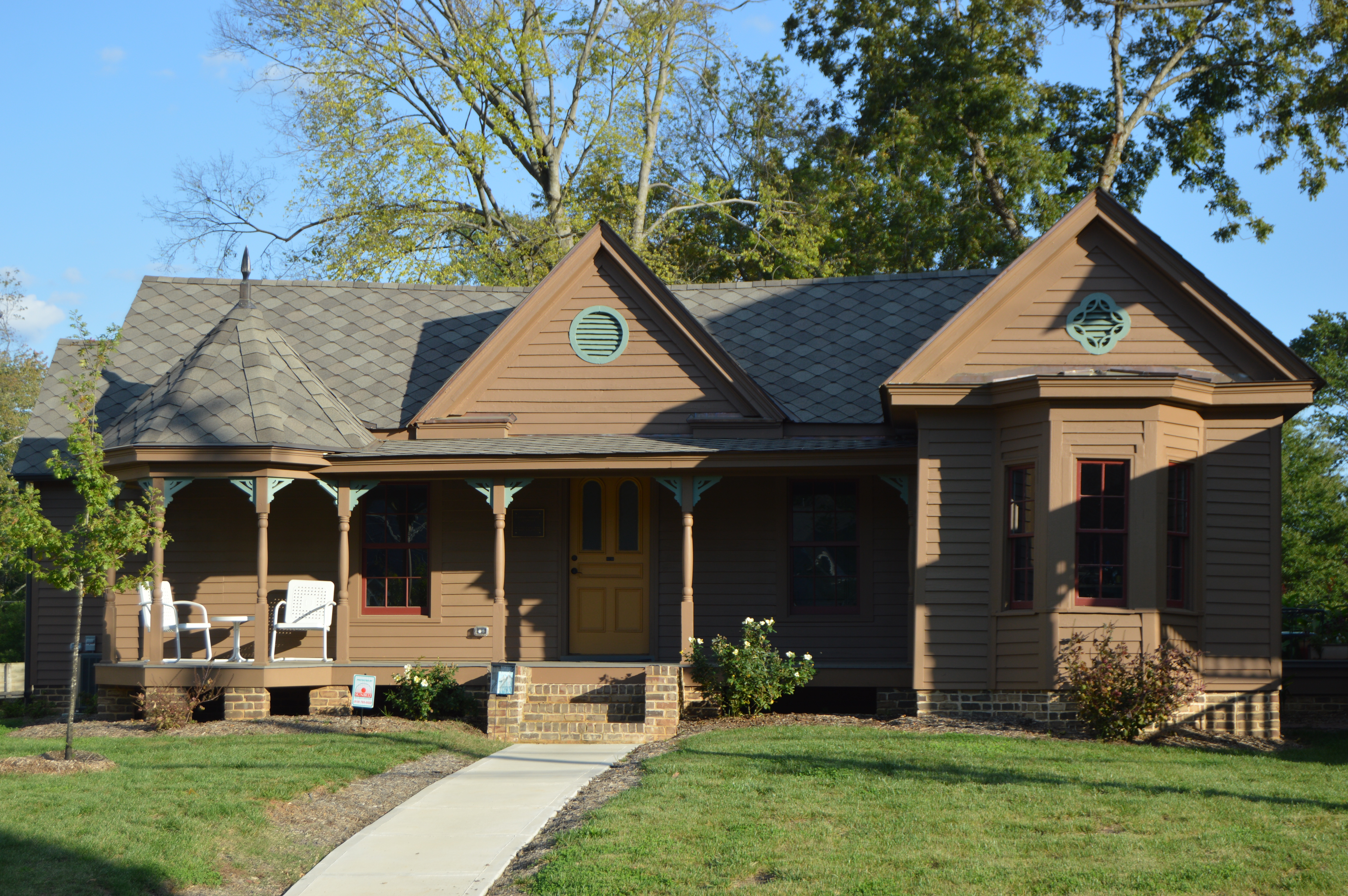
- Facade

- Location within North Carolina Location within the United States
- Location: 814 Oberlin Rd., Raleigh, North Carolina
- Coordinates: 35°47′49″N 78°39′40″W
- Area: 0.2 acres (0.081 ha)
- Built: c. 1880-1893, c. 1900
- Architectural style: Queen Anne
- MPS: Oberlin, North Carolina MPS
- NRHP reference No.: 02000501
- Added to NRHP: May 16, 2002

Rev. Plummer T. Hall House, also known as the Hall-Jackson House, is a historic home located in Oberlin Village in Raleigh, North Carolina. It was built between 1880 and 1893, and is a one-story, Queen Anne-style frame cottage. An office or study addition was built about 1900. It was the home of a locally prominent African-American family.

It was listed on the National Register of Historic Places in 2002.
