= Lumsden–Boone Building =

- U.S. National Register of Historic Places
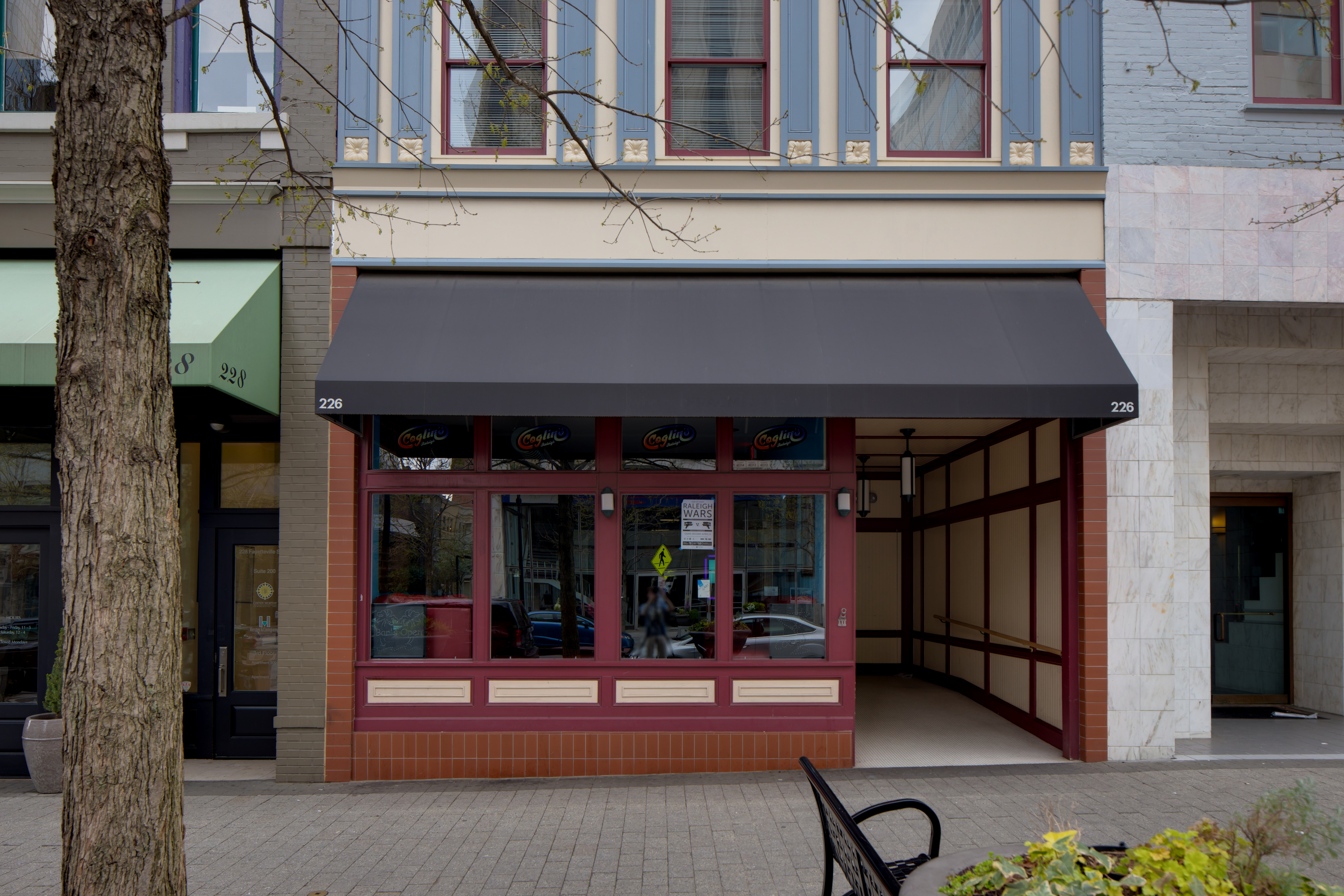

- Location within North Carolina Location within the United States
- Location: 226 Fayetteville Street, Raleigh, North Carolina
- Coordinates: 35°46′38″N 78°38′23″W
- Area: 0.1 acres (0.040 ha)
- Built: 1896
- Architectural style: Classical Revival
- Part of: Fayetteville Street Historic District (ID07001412)
- NRHP reference No.: 83001923
- Added to NRHP: September 8, 1983

The Lumsden–Boone Building is a historic commercial building located at 226 Fayetteville Street in the Fayetteville Street Historic District of Raleigh, North Carolina, United States. Constructed in 1896 for tin and hardware dealer J.C.S. Lumsden, the building is the only surviving metal-front building today on Fayetteville Street. Boone's official business name was "C.R. Boone, DeLuxe Clothier"; his was considered one of the city's leading businesses and boasted the slogan "Come and See". The Lumsden–Boone Building is currently used by a web design company. The building was added to the National Register of Historic Places on September 8, 1983, and was renovated in 1985 and in 2008.

== See also ==
- National Register of Historic Places listings in Wake County, North Carolina
