= Latta University =

Black trade school in Raleigh, North Carolina (1892–1920s)

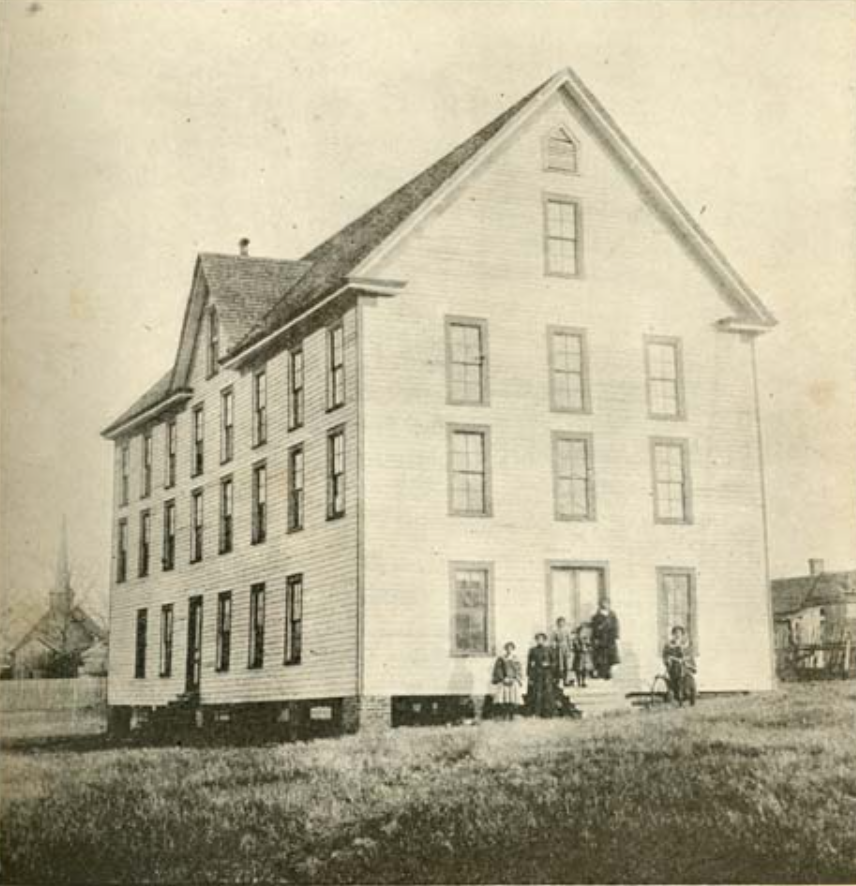
- Latta University building, c. 1903

Location
- 1001 Parker Street; Raleigh, United States, North Carolina; United States

Information
- School type: Private African American
- Founded: October 6, 1892; 133 years ago
- Founder: Morgan London Latta
- Status: Closed
- Closed: c. 1922
- President: Morgan London Latta
- Grades: Primary
  - Other: Adults over the age of 16
- Classes offered: Elementary and Trade school
- Campus type: Rural

Latta University was a historically Black coeducational trade school and primary school in Raleigh, North Carolina. It was founded in 1892 by Rev. Morgan London Latta. The school closed sometime before 1922 amid scandals surrounding its founder's misrepresentation of its activities and the theft of donations to the university. Investigations by the United States Bureau of Education found that Latta University never lived up to its founder's descriptions and that fundraising activities continued after the school stopped teaching students. Today, the university is considered a mostly dishonest scheme that did little to advance Raleigh's Black population.

== History ==
In 1892, Rev. Morgan London Latta started Latta University in Raleigh, North Carolina as a coeducational trade school for underprivileged Blacks. Born enslaved near Raleigh, Latta graduated from Shaw University and became a school teacher. (Note: The New York Age, an African American newspaper, speculated in 1906 that Latta lacked a college edition. Wilmoth Carter, a 21st-century professor at Shaw University, writes that Latta only received a 5th-grade education.) He opened Latta University on October 6, 1892, with fifty students, and served as its president.

The university was incorporated in North Carolina on February 15, 1894. Latta University had 65 students in the fall of 1893 and 92 for the spring 1894 semester. At the end of the 1889–1900 school year, it had around 100 students, including three graduates. It reported 127 students in September 1902.

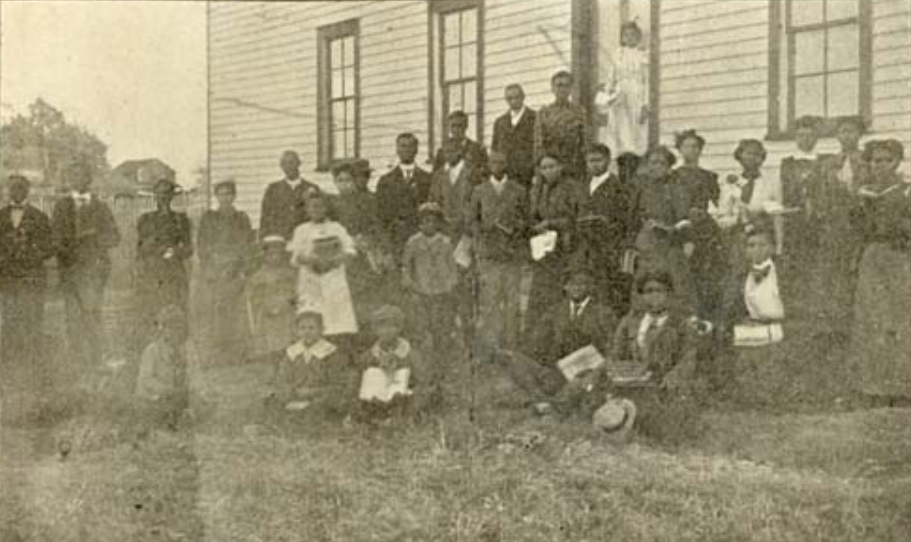
Latta University faculty and staff, c. 1903

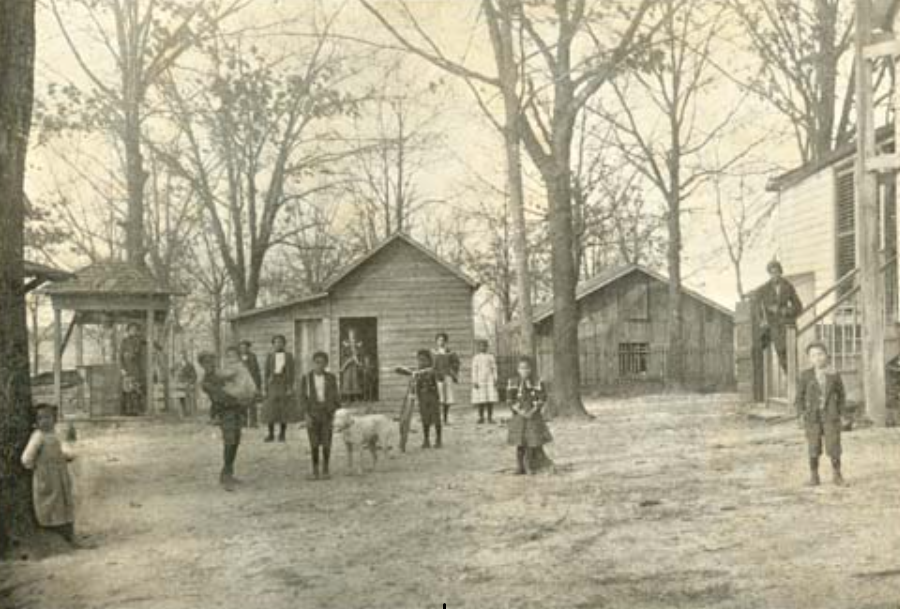
Manual Training Department, c. 1903

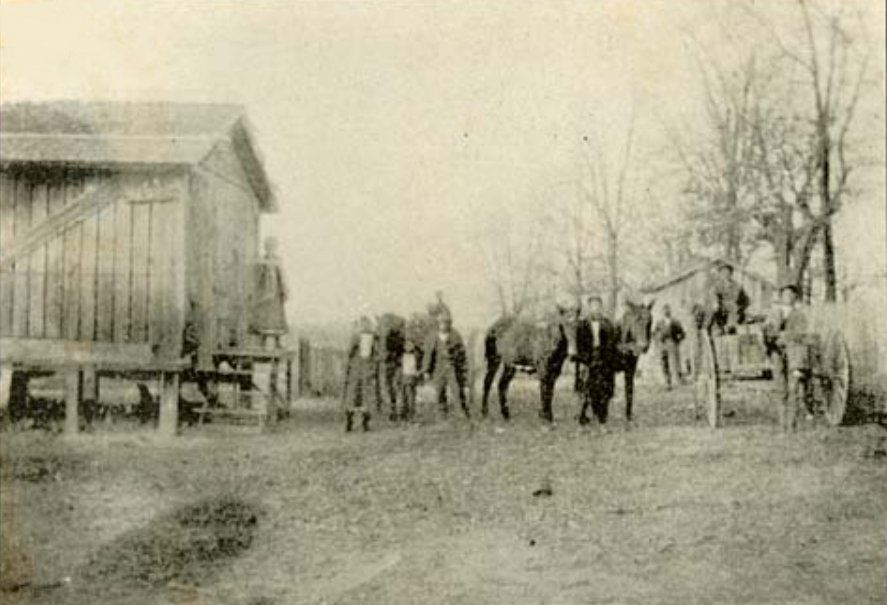
Industrial Department, c. 1903

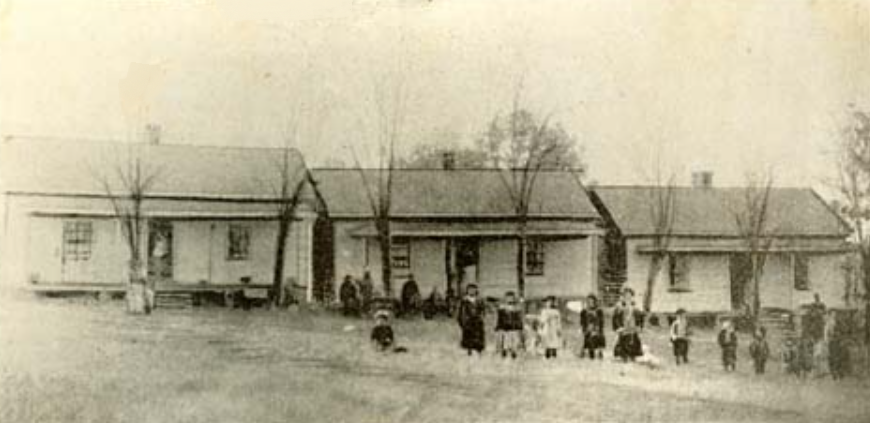
Kindergarten Department, c. 1903

Latta University taught blacksmithing, brick-laying, laundry, carpentry, and making horseshoes. Its students were men and women who were previously enslaved in the Raleigh area, including the Cameron, Mordecai, and Stagville plantations. Students in the industrial school were required to be at least sixteen years old. However, the university also had a kindergarten department to educate orphaned children. Some of the male students were members of an Orphanage Band that played around Raleigh to raise money for their education.

Tuition, room, and board cost $6.75 a month for male students and $5.75 a month for female students. This included linens, furnishings, heat, light, and washing. Those who could not afford tuition worked on the school's farm or as construction workers on campus. In his autobiography, Latta wrote that one-third of the students could not afford to pay tuition, causing him to accumulate personal debt. As a result, he often relied on donations from the public to keep the university operational. Latta and other faculty members served as the university's agents to fundraise in North Carolina and Northern states.

On May 12, 1896, the university lost three buildings to fire, including the library and the president's residence. In September 1897, Latta announced that the school would close through October 7, 1897 to rebuild the buildings lost in the fire. In July 1904, a severe storm hit Raleigh, damaging and toppling the main two-story building on the Latta campus; no one was injured because school was not in session. Despite this loss, L. D. Merrett, a college graduate and former principal of the Colored Graded School in Kinston, North Carolina, became a professor at Latta University in the fall of 1904.

Latta University officially closed sometime before 1922. Latta and his wife eventually left their house on the university property and moved to Philadelphia, Pennsylvania.

== Campus ==
The Latta University campus was located at 1001 Parker Street, off of Oberlin Road in the Oberlin Neighborhood of Raleigh. Latta purchased in the property in 1891. A three-story school building was constructed in 1895 that was 52 by 200 feet (16 by 61 m). By the fall of 1897, the campus was supposed to have seven buildings, including a dormitory for students. The campus consisted of nearly 300 acres (120 ha) in 1903. The university sold 100 acres (40 ha) of its campus in September 1913, for $100 per acre. The 1914 Sanborn map of the campus showed two main structures—the recitation hall and dormitory—and three smaller buildings, identified as the Kindergarten Department in a photograph in Latta's book.

The Rev. M. L. Latta House, the last remaining structure on the campus, was destroyed by a fire in January 2007. After the fire, the remaining two acres of the former campus were given to the city of Raleigh. In 2009, the city undertook an archaeological survey of the former campus, finding the foundations of buildings and numerous artifacts relating to the trade school and its curriculum.

== Scandal and fraud ==
=== Honorary degree scandal ===
In 1906, the African American newspaper The New York Age reported that Latta University was in the business of awarding honorary degrees to Blacks; these degrees implied that individuals who were illiterate or with little education had "passed a satisfactory Examination". Based on the grammar and punctuation of a Latta University diploma, the newspaper speculated that the university's president "does not appear to have any degree himself" However, the newspaper noted that Latta University had the legal authority to confer degrees.

In 1919, the North Carolina Senate introduced a bill to regulate the degrees being issued by colleges. However, the bill did not pass by a vote of 38 to 36 in the North Carolina House in February 1919. The News and Observer noted that this allowed "Latta University and its illustrious president free to make B.A.'s, B.S.'s, LL.D.'s, and D.D.'s of the newly made rich in the metropolis", implying that Latta was selling diplomas.

=== Fundraising scam ===
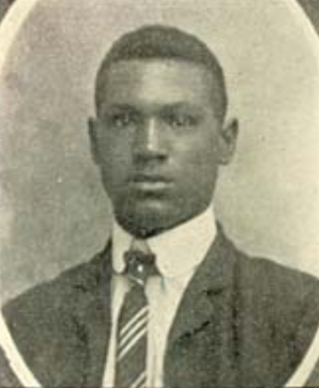
John H. Bivens, Latta University general agent, c. 1903

In August 1911, faculty member John H. Bivans was arrested in Reading, Pennsylvania for fraudulently collecting money for Latta University; Bivans had collected $800 but had only delivered $23 in checks to Latta University. Around 1912, rumors began to circulate that Latta himself was raising donations for the school from Northerners but was not using the funds toward the education of students. Some North Carolina newspapers called the university a "scam" and a "fraud". In 1912, The Asheville Times noted that no students had been enrolled in Latta University for many years.

In March 1916, Bivans was arrested in Mount Vernon, New York on suspicion of being "a fake fundraiser". Bivans testified he was working for Latta, his brother-in-law. The police wired an enquiry to Latta, who responded that Bivans had been told to stop collecting and asking for his release. Bivans was sentenced to three months at Blackwell's Island prison.

In its 1916 bulletin, Negro Education: A Study of the Private and Higher Schools for Colored People in the United States, the United States Bureau of Education described Latta University as a "flagrant" case of "larceny by false pretenses". It concluded that Latta started construction on school buildings but only had one teacher and a few elementary school students; furthermore, the university had ceased operations by sometime before 1903. However, Latta published a book in 1903 where he wrote that the still-operating university had more than 1,400 students and 23 buildings; thus, misrepresenting Latta University to potential donors. As noted by the Bureau of Education, Latta University's representatives were still fundraising for the school in 1916, apparently securing funds for Morgan Latta.

In 1961, Wilmoth Carter of Shaw University wrote, "Latta University was all bogus, it wasn't even a good primary school...he only had two wooden buildings and they weren't even good barns. The three or four students he had were members of his own family. He hardly had a fifth grade education himself."

== Legacy ==
The City of Raleigh opened the remaining two acres of the former campus as the Latta University Historic Park on April 24, 2024. The park includes interpretive signage, an outline of Morgan Latta's house, and a walking path. It is overseen by the Raleigh Department of Parks and Recreation which notes:

Today, Latta University Historic Park illuminates the history of the Morgan London Latta family and Latta University, providing a unique lens through which to explore race, community, and education in Raleigh within the broader context of the African American experience in the South at the turn of the twentieth century. Latta University Historic Park seeks to inspire thought and encourage reflection, recognizing a complex legacy that is grounded in resilience, achievement, and courage through adversity.
