= Fayetteville Street Historic District =

Historic district in North Carolina, United States

- U.S. National Register of Historic Places
- U.S. Historic district
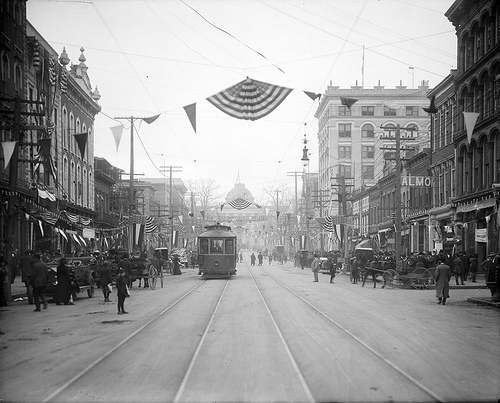
- Fayetteville Street, c 1910s

- Location within North Carolina Location within the United States
- Location: Roughly 100-400 blocks of Fayetteville, 00-100 blocks of W. Hargett, 00 blk. of W. Martin, 100-400 S. Salisbury Sts., Raleigh, North Carolina
- Coordinates: 35°46′39″N 78°38′21″W
- Area: 12 acres (4.9 ha)
- Architect: multiple
- NRHP reference No.: 07001412
- Added to NRHP: February 27, 2008

The Fayetteville Street Historic District in Raleigh, North Carolina is a historic district listed on the National Register of Historic Places (NRHP). The District includes the 100–400 blocks of Fayetteville Street, the 00–100 blocks of the south side of West Hargett Street, the 00 block of the north side of West Martin Street, and the 100–400 blocks of South Salisbury Street.

The District, composed mostly of commercial establishments, is home to eleven buildings listed on the NRHP. They include:

- Masonic Temple Building, 133 Fayetteville St.
- Briggs Hardware Building, 220 Fayetteville St.
- Lumsden-Boone Building, 226 Fayetteville St.
- Mahler Building, 228 Fayetteville St.
- Carolina Trust Building, 230 Fayetteville St.
- Federal Building, 314 Fayetteville St.
- Sir Walter Raleigh Hotel, 400 Fayetteville St.
- Raleigh Bank and Trust Company Building, 5 W. Hargett St.
- Odd Fellows Building, 19 W. Hargett St.
- McLellan's Five and Dime Annex, 14 W. Martin St.
- Capital Club Building, 16 W. Martin St.

== See also ==
- List of Registered Historic Places in North Carolina
