= Isabelle Bowen Henderson House and Gardens =

Historic house in North Carolina, United States

- U.S. National Register of Historic Places
- U.S. Historic district
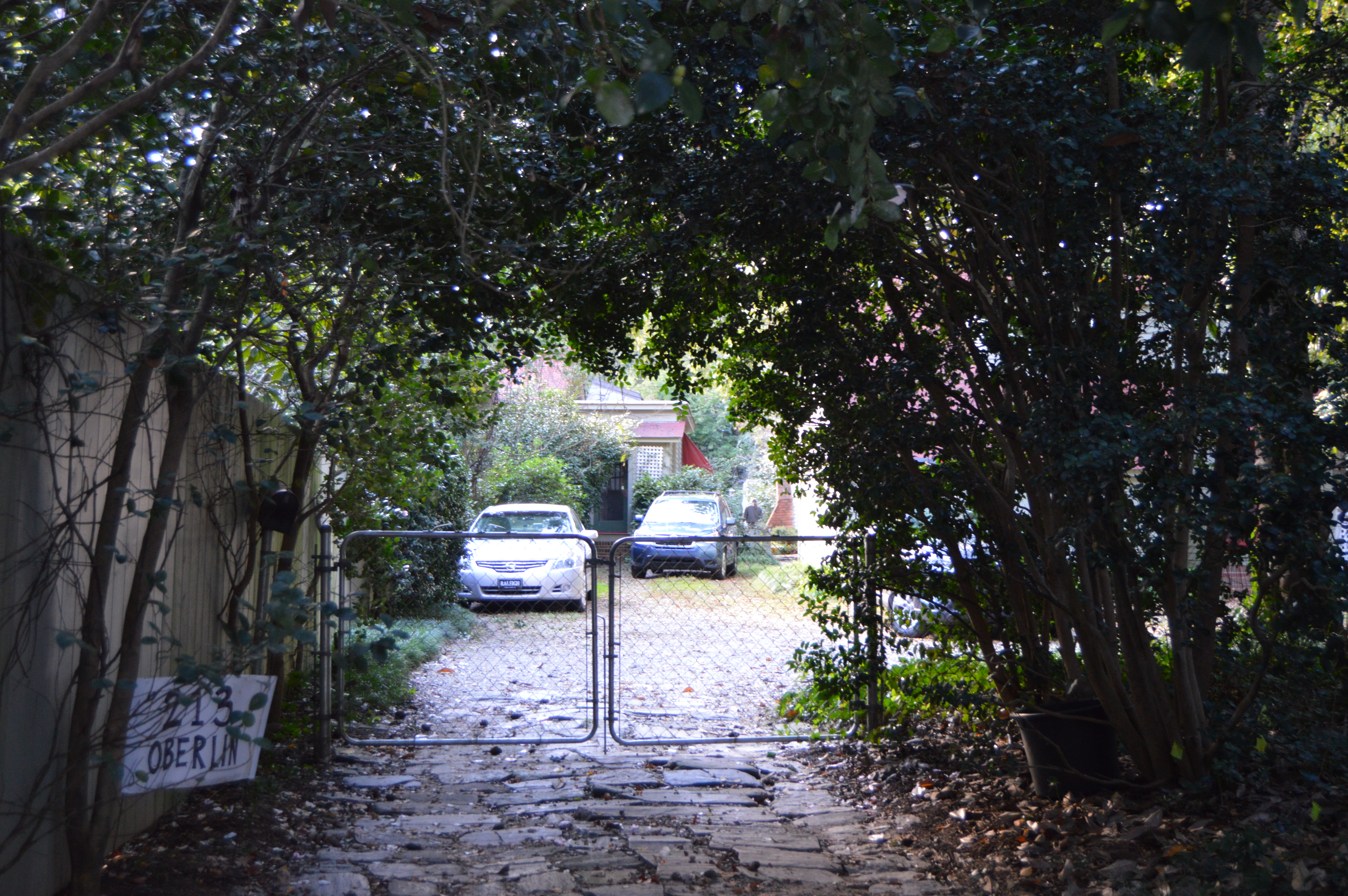
- Property entrance

- Location within North Carolina Location within the United States
- Location: 213 Oberlin Rd., Raleigh, North Carolina
- Coordinates: 35°47′15″N 78°39′44″W
- Area: 1.2 acres (0.49 ha)
- Built: 1937
- Architect: Isabelle Bowen Henderson
- Architectural style: Colonial Revival, Late Victorian
- NRHP reference No.: 89001049
- Added to NRHP: August 7, 1989

Isabelle Bowen Henderson House and Gardens is a historic home and garden located at Oberlin Village in Raleigh, North Carolina. The main house is a modest 19th century turreted late Victorian period frame cottage, with a Colonial Revival style studio wing and kitchen and dining porch added in 1937. Also on the property is a contributing two car garage and apartment building (late 1930s, 1950), herb house (c. 1937), front garden (1937-1938), back garden (1937 onward), herb garden (c. 1937), and brick terrace (1937-1938). It was the home of noted local artist Isabelle Bowen Henderson and representative of the Williamsburg Revival design movement in Raleigh.

It was listed on the National Register of Historic Places in 1989.
