= Rev. M. L. Latta House =

Historic house in North Carolina, United States

- U.S. National Register of Historic Places
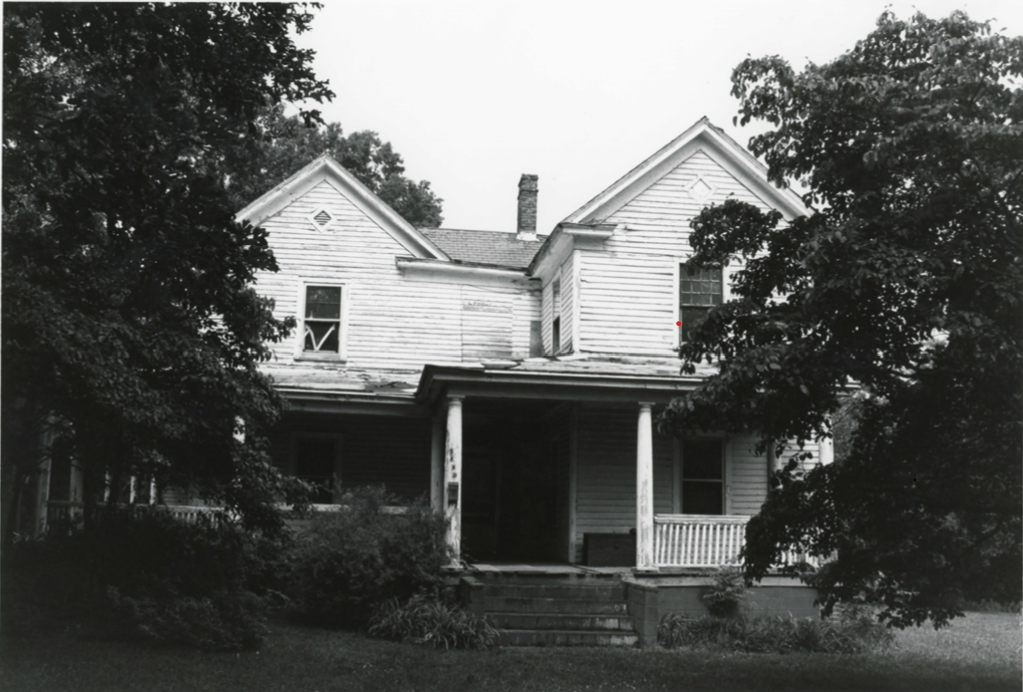
- Rev. M. L. Latta House, 2001

- Location within North Carolina Location within the United States
- Location: 1001 Parker St., Raleigh, North Carolina
- Coordinates: 35°47′52.89″N 78°39′47.1″W
- Area: 2 acres (0.81 ha)
- Architectural style: Queen Anne, Colonial Revival
- MPS: Oberlin, North Carolina MPS
- NRHP reference No.: 02000502
- Added to NRHP: May 16, 2002

The Rev. M. L. Latta House was a historic home located in the Oberlin neighborhood of Raleigh, North Carolina. It was the last remaining building from Latta University, a trade school for African Americans that operated from 1892 until around 1920. The house was placed on the National Register of Historic Places in 2002. It was destroyed by a fire in 2007.

== History ==
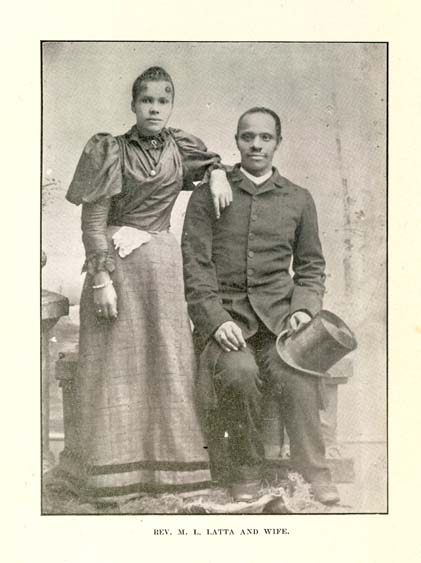
Laura and Morgan London Latta

The Rev. M. L. Latta House was located at 1001 Parker Street in the freeman's settlement of Oberlin Village (now Raleigh, North Carolina). It was built as the home of Laura Bivens and Morgan London Latta, and their ten children, who lived in the house starting around 1905. Latta was a former slave who graduated from Shaw University after the Civil War. He founded Latta University, a trade school, in 1882 to educate freedmen and orphans in Raleigh's African-American community and built his house adjacent to the campus.

The size and style of the Latta House reveal the wealth of Latta, significant within the early 20th century African American community of Raleigh. It was one of the largest houses in Oberlin at the time and was constructed in a fashional style.

After Latta University closed amid a scandal around 1922, Latta and his wife moved to Philadelphia, Pennsylvania by 1930. Neighbors Chesley and Berta Haywood purchased Latta House at auction in 1933. Haywood was an fireman with Norfolk and Southern Railroad. The Haywoods moved into Latta House by 1935. However, it was occupited by various renters in the 1940s. After Chesley Haywood died, Berta Haywood lived in the house from the mid-1950s through the 1970s.

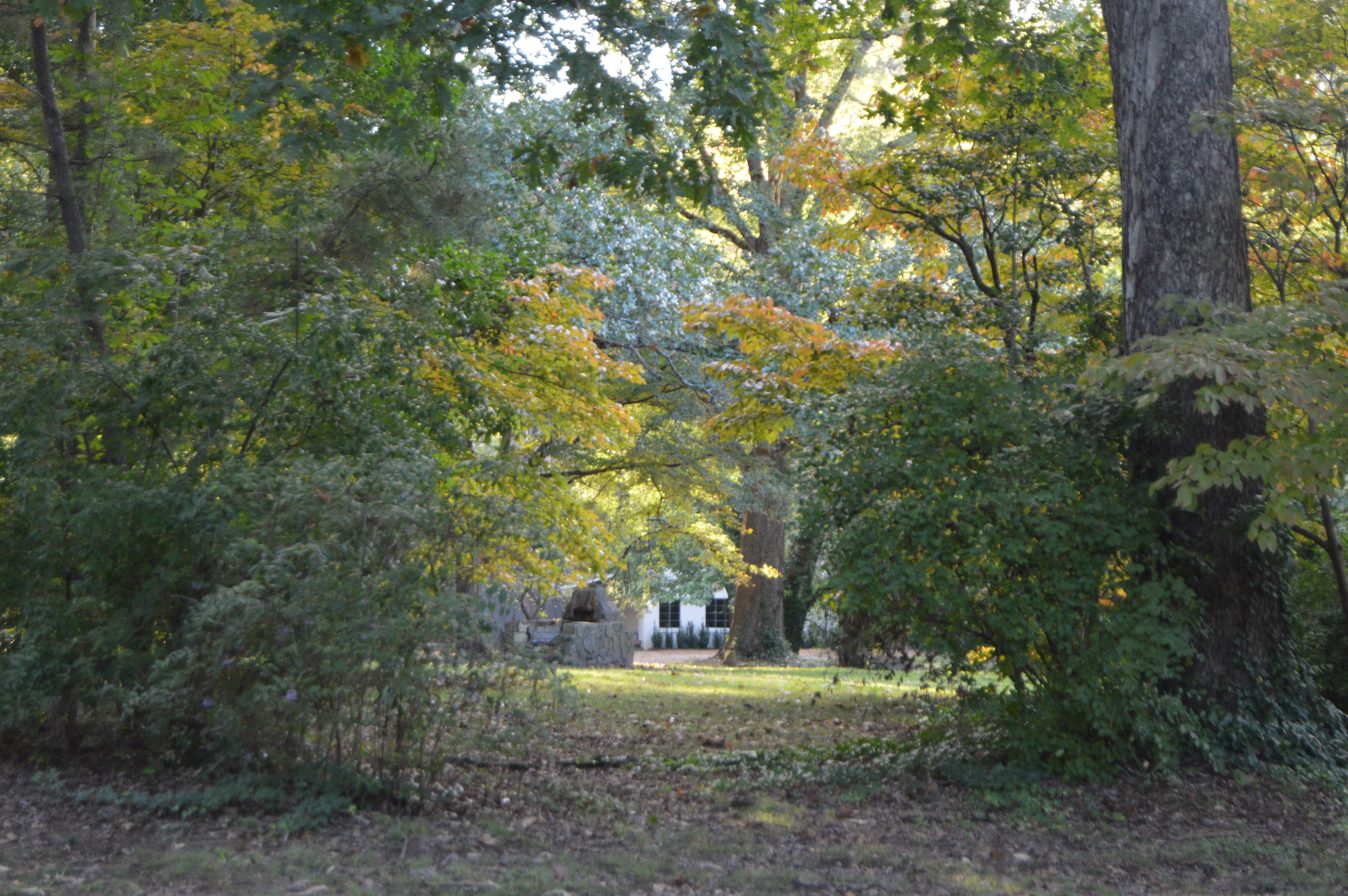
Site of the former Latta House

When Berta Haywood died, the house was sold to Adryon Clay. Later, the house was unoccupied but overseen by a caretaker. The Latta House property became a gathering place for the surrounding African American community. Over time, the Latta House was the only surviving structure on the campus of the former trade school.

The Latta House Foundation was established, with plans to adapt the house as a cultural center. On January 8, 2007, a fire destroyed the house, leaving only its brick foundation. After the fire, the property's owner gave the land to the city of Raleigh for use as a park.

== Architecture ==
The Rev. M. L. Latta House was built about 1905. It was a two-story Colonial Revial and Queen Anne style house with a Tuscan order wraparound porch. Constructed of clapboards, the house had a brick foundation, a slate roof, and two corbeled chimneys. The main level of the house included a central hallway, with large rooms on either side and smaller rooms in back. The front rooms were originally decorated with stenciling. The second floor featured five bedrooms.

The house was listed on the National Register of Historic Places on May 16, 2002. It was designated a Raleigh Historic Site in 2003 but lost that status in 2007 when the house was destroyed by a fire.

== See also ==
- List of Registered Historic Places in North Carolina
- National Register of Historic Places listings in Wake County, North Carolina
