= Willis M. Graves House =

Historic house in North Carolina, United States

- U.S. National Register of Historic Places
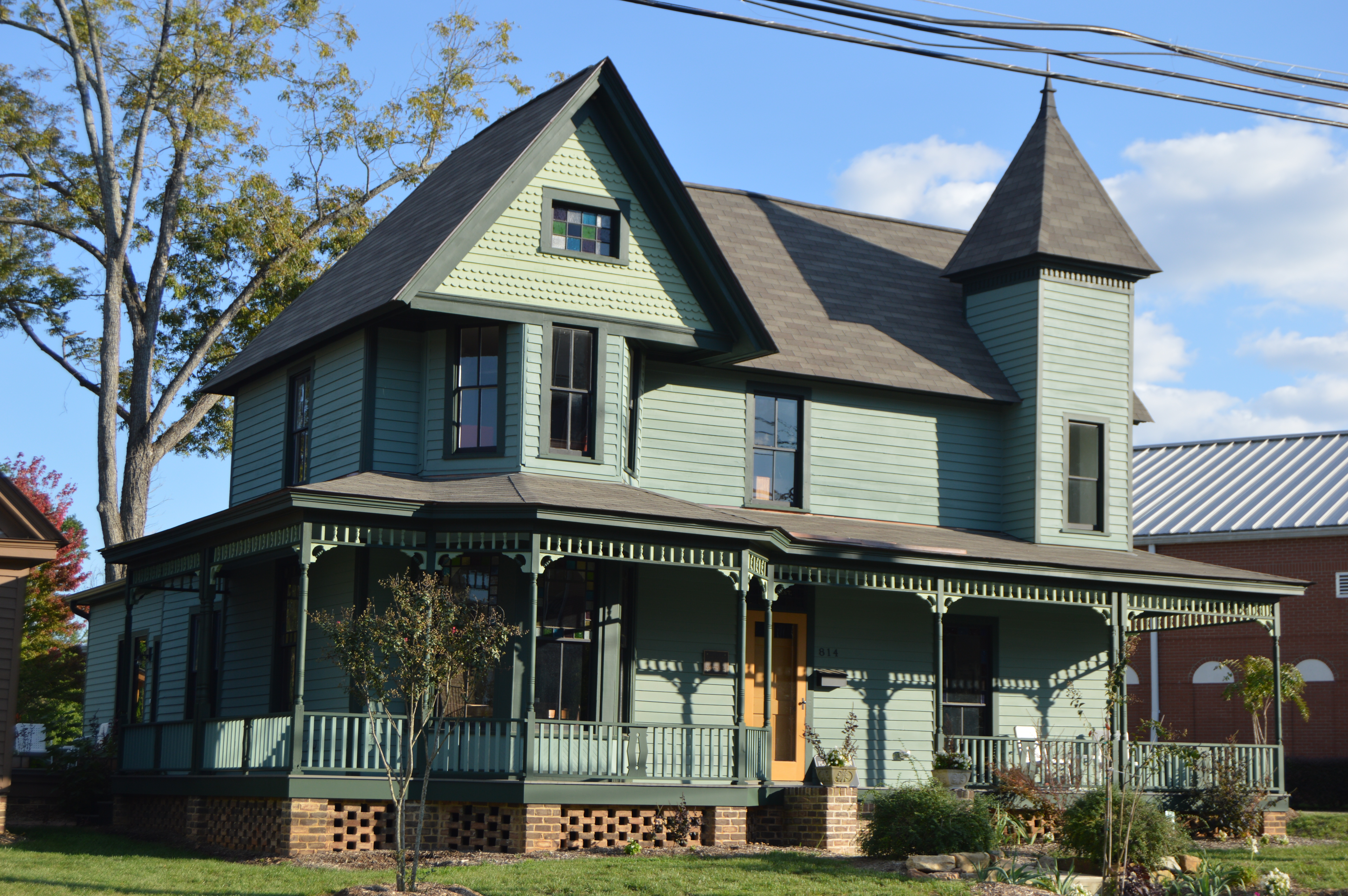
- Front and northern side

- Location within North Carolina Location within the United States
- Location: 816 Oberlin Rd., Raleigh, North Carolina
- Coordinates: 35.7951°N 78.6612°W
- Area: 0.4 acres (0.16 ha)
- Built: c. 1884
- Architectural style: Queen Anne
- MPS: Oberlin, North Carolina MPS
- NRHP reference No.: 100006810
- Added to NRHP: August 16, 2021

The Willis M. Graves House, also known as the Graves-Fields House and Oakcrest, is a historic home located on Oberlin Road in Raleigh, Wake County, North Carolina. It was built about 1884 in the freedmen's village of Oberlin, and is a two-story, frame Queen Anne style dwelling. It has a projecting, two-story polygonal bay capped by a very large gable; one-story wraparound porch; and a projecting, two-story square tower with a pyramidal roof. It was built by Willis M. Graves, an African-American brick mason.

It was originally listed on the National Register of Historic Places in 2002 (#02000500). It was delisted in 2019 due to being relocated, but was relisted again in 2021.

== See also ==
- List of Registered Historic Places in North Carolina
