= Briggs Hardware Building =

Historic building in North Carolina, US

- U.S. National Register of Historic Places
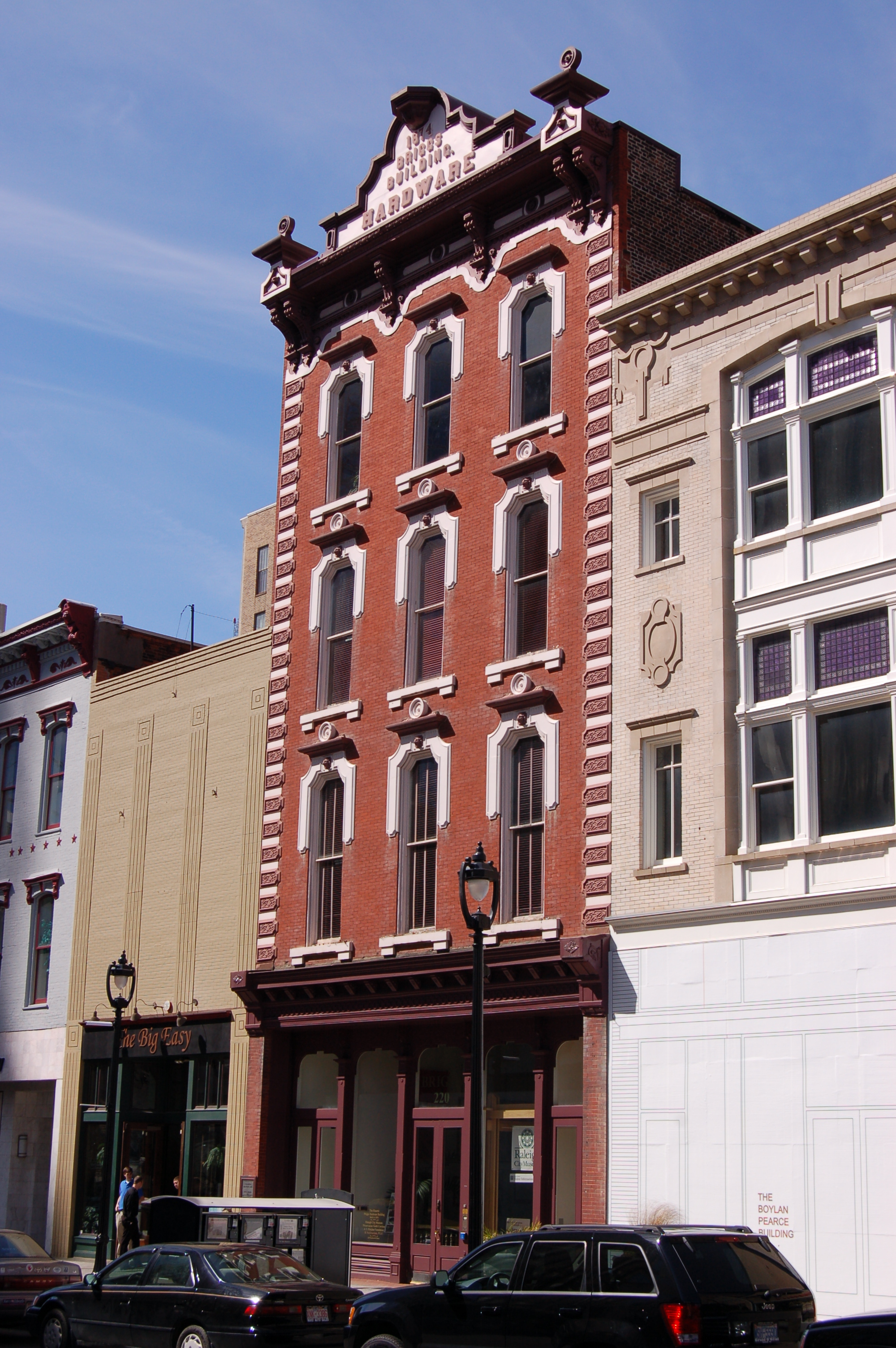
- Briggs Hardware Building

- Location within North Carolina Location within the United States
- Location: 220 Fayetteville St., Raleigh, North Carolina
- Coordinates: 35°46′38.56″N 78°38′23.27″W
- Area: less than one acre
- Built: 1874
- Part of: Fayetteville Street Historic District
- NRHP reference No.: 73001372
- Added to NRHP: October 25, 1973

The Briggs Hardware Building is a four-story historic building in downtown Raleigh, Wake County, North Carolina. It was built in 1874 by Thomas Briggs to house his family-owned hardware store. The building was listed on the National Register of Historic Places in 1973.

Currently the building is home to the City of Raleigh Museum, and is owned by a joint group of non-governmental organizations.

== Briggs Hardware ==
In the 1850s Thomas H. Briggs opened his hardware store on Fayetteville Street with partner James Dodd. The partnership with Dodd ended in 1868 and the store became Thomas H. Briggs & Sons. Business was good and in 1874 Briggs was able to construct a new building for the family business. The new building stood at four stories and was called Raleigh's first "skyscraper". It would remain the tallest building in Raleigh for the next 33 years.

Briggs Hardware would continue to serve the city from this location until 1995 when the store finally moved to a new location outside of downtown. The hardware store is still owned and operated by the family to this day.

== The legend ==
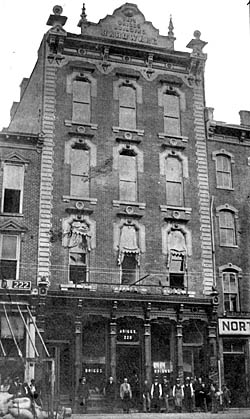
Historic view of Briggs Hardware Building

Soon after the building was completed, a legend circulated about how Thomas Briggs was able to afford to build such a large and elaborate building following the Civil War. The legend claimed that sometime prior to the Union occupation of Raleigh in 1865, Briggs converted all of his Confederate money into gold and silver coins. He then took the coins, stuffed them into pipes, found a distinctive grove of trees, and buried the money to prevent Union soldiers from stealing the money. When the soldiers arrived in Raleigh they set up camp near the grove of trees and cut them down. After the troops left, Briggs allegedly spent the next few years searching for his money. When he finally found the coins, he used the money to build his new hardware store.

== Additional uses ==
While the lower floors were used for hardware sales, the building's upper levels saw a variety of uses over the years. In the 1890s, the Oak City Guard rented space for drill practice. Later, the city's first YMCA was housed here, as well as a Lutheran church congregation, the Raleigh Little Theater and offices of a number of attorneys and insurance companies.

== Building description ==
Thanks to the Briggs family and preservation efforts the building looks today much as it did when it was first built.

The front facade of the building displays an example of the lively architectural taste of the mid-to-late 19th century. The contrast of red brick with light accents was a favorite of the high Victorian Gothic style. The hoods and drip molds over the windows are medieval in style, while the tall, bracketed cornice shows the influence of the Italianate style.

The building is four stories tall with a basement running below wooden floors. The original wood floors remain in the building.

The building runs the entire length of one city block (between Fayetteville & Salisbury Streets) and is surrounded on either side by two similarly long buildings. The result is a long narrow interior with no side windows. In the center of the building is an opening going up to windows on the roof-top that serves as a skylight for all four above-ground floors. The absence of windows along the side of the building made this skylight opening a necessity in 1874 when there was no electricity.

== Sources ==
- National Park Service: Briggs Hardware Building
- Greater Raleigh Convention and Visitors Bureau
