= Sir Walter Hotel =

Historic hotel in North Carolina, US

- Sir Walter Raleigh Hotel
- U.S. National Register of Historic Places
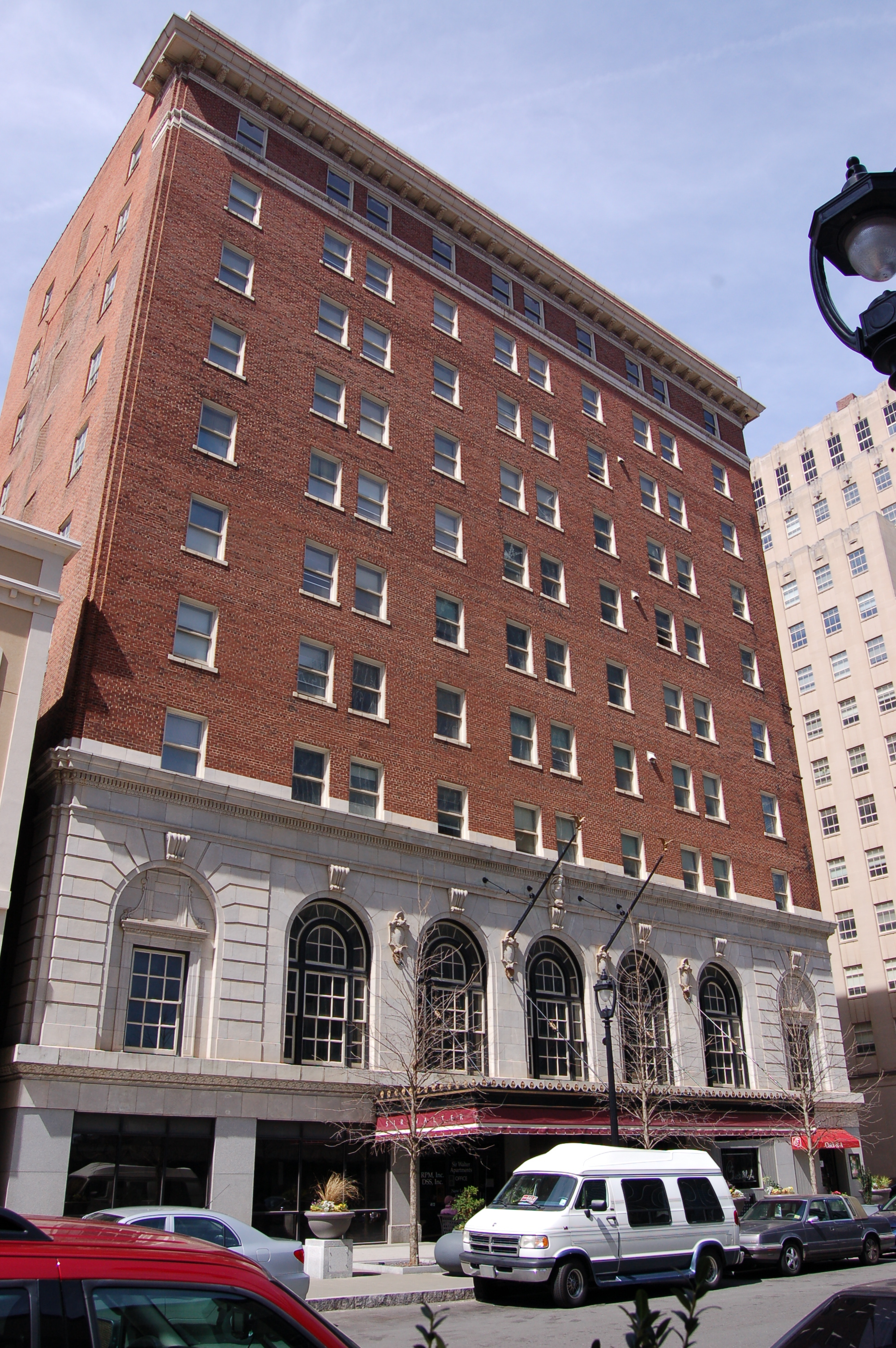
- Sir Walter Apartments, 2008

- Location within North Carolina Location within the United States
- Location: 400-412 Fayetteville St., Raleigh, North Carolina
- Coordinates: 35°46′31.4″N 78°38′22.5″W
- Area: less than one acre
- Architect: B. H. Griffin, J. A. Salter
- Part of: Fayetteville Street Historic District
- NRHP reference No.: 78001980
- Added to NRHP: August 11, 1978

The Sir Walter Hotel is the oldest surviving hotel building in Raleigh, North Carolina. Constructed between 1923 and 1924 on Fayetteville Street and named after Sir Walter Raleigh, the hotel was nicknamed North Carolina's "third house of government", due to its location and being a focal point for state political activity until the 1960s.

== History ==
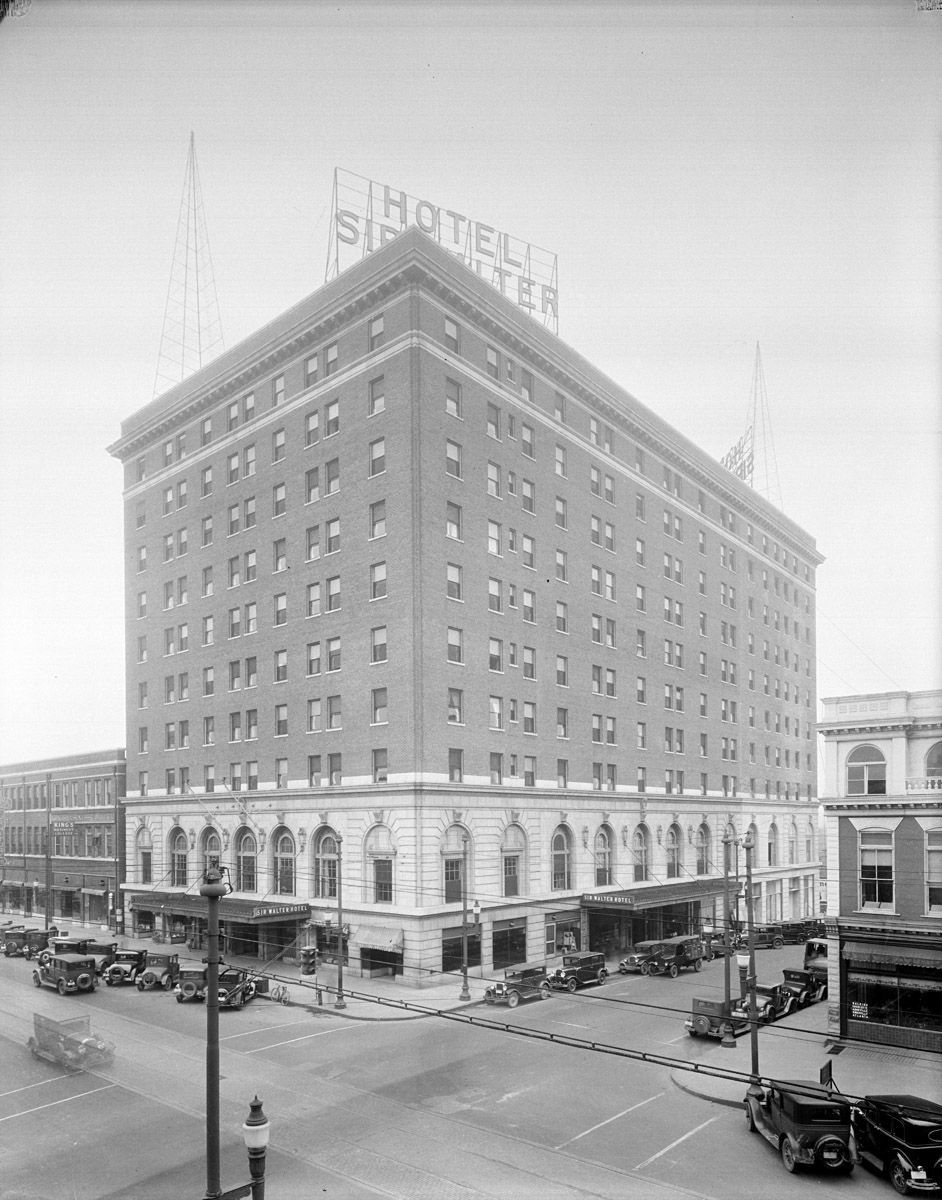
The Hotel Sir Walter, shortly after its enlargement in 1938

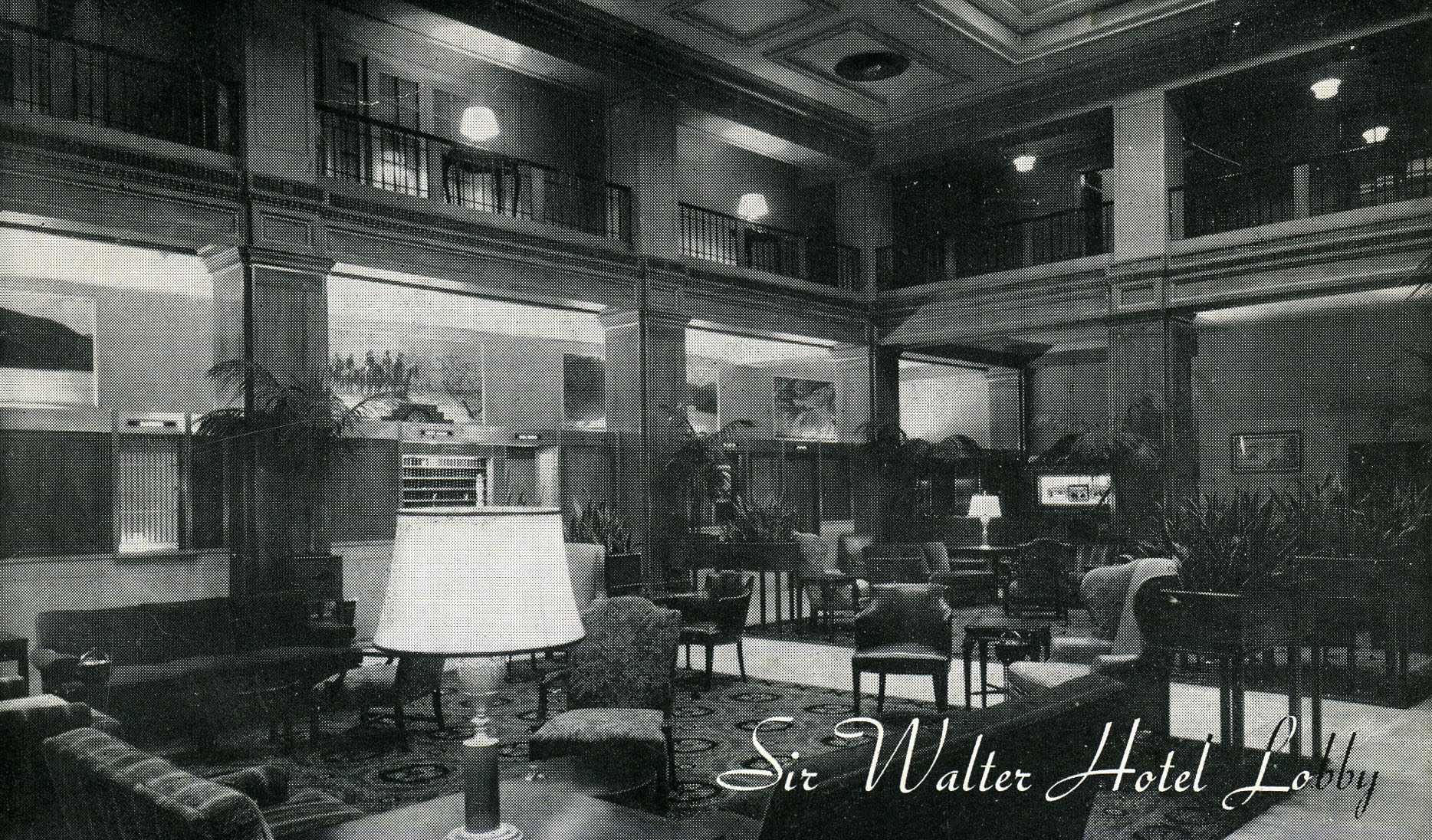
Lobby of the hotel in 1955

The Capital Construction Company was formed in 1923 to build a hotel in Raleigh to attract convention traffic that had been going to Greensboro and Durham. In January 1924, the Hotel Sir Walter opened. It was the largest building in the southern portion of Raleigh's business district. The hotel became the unofficial headquarters of the North Carolina Democratic Party, at the time the dominant political force in the state. By 1925, the Sir Walter was home to over 80 percent of the state legislature. In addition to legislators, the hotel was home to lobbyists, aides, jurors, newspapermen, businessmen and other influential individuals over the next three decades. For years liquor lobbyists rented Room 215 and every week delivered nine cases of bourbon there. Lobbyist would then distribute the bottles to legislators in brown paper bags. U.S. Senator Sam Ervin referred to the hotel as "the most politically saturated inn in America".

The Great Depression forced the building's owners into bankruptcy in 1934. The hotel was leased to the North State Hotel Company in 1935 and fully renovated. After the company added 50 rooms in 1938, the hotel became the largest in the state and gave the Sir Walter a reputation as one of North Carolina's top convention hotels.

In 1956, the hotel was sold to the Robert Meyer hotel chain. During the 1960s, suburban motel development, the completion of the new state Legislative Building, and general downtown decline affected the hotel's business. The Meyer chain sold the hotel in 1964, and in 1967 owner John A. Williams donated the Hotel Sir Walter to the North Carolina State University Foundation. The $2 million hotel continued operating under the same management and employees. Profits from the hotel went to support student scholarships and financial aid. On February 13, 1968, the hotel briefly joined the Sheraton chain and was renamed the Sheraton-Sir Walter Hotel. In early 1969, the university sold the hotel to Plaza Associates for $1.84 million. Plaza then traded the hotel to developer Kidd Brewer on March 28, 1969 for the land on which the Crabtree Valley Mall would be built. The hotel left Sheraton soon after, returning to its original name.

By 1975, as downtown Raleigh decayed and demand for hotel rooms plummeted, the majority of the building had been converted to offices for the North Carolina Department of Transportation and other businesses. The building was sold to Goldsboro developer David Weil in 1978 and converted into the Sir Walter Apartments, housing 140 apartments for seniors. It was sold in 2017 to an Ohio-based developer who announced plans to restore it, possibly returning it to use as a hotel, offices or apartments. It was sold again on January 2, 2019, for $16.8 million to Capital Realty Group, which announced plans to renovate the structure but continue using it as senior housing.

== Design ==
The Sir Walter is typical of American hotels of the 1920s. It is a 10-story imposing L-shaped building primarily made of brick, with classical stone ornamentation at the street and roof levels. It was placed on the National Register of Historic Places on August 11, 1978, as the Sir Walter Raleigh Hotel. The Sir Walter Hotel is now a designated Raleigh Historic Landmark.

== See also ==
- List of Registered Historic Places in North Carolina

== Works cited ==
- Christensen, Rob (2010). The Paradox of Tar Heel Politics : The Personalities, Elections, and Events That Shaped Modern North Carolina (second ed.). Chapel Hill: The University of North Carolina Press. ISBN 978-0-8078-7151-5.
