= Mahler and Carolina Trust Buildings =

Historic theater in North Carolina, US

- U.S. National Register of Historic Places
- U.S. Historic district – Contributing property
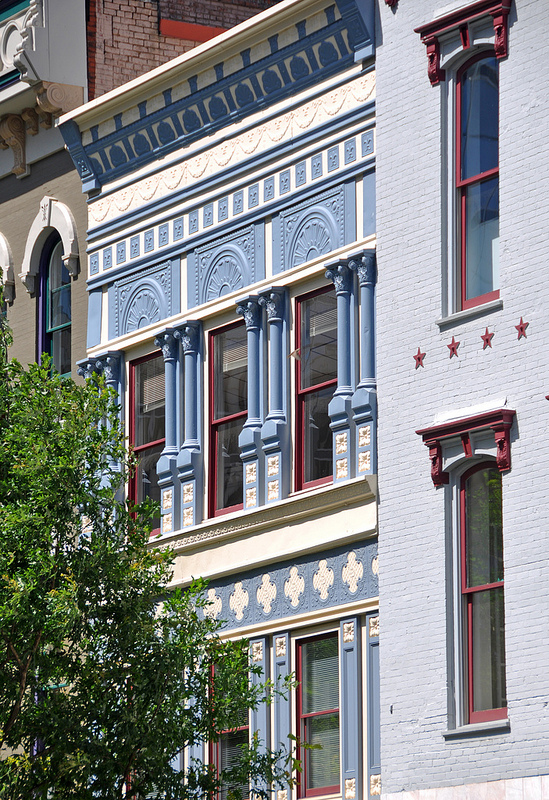
- Mahler and Carolina Trust Buildings, September 2013

- Location within North Carolina Location within the United States
- Location: 228-232 Fayetteville St. Mall, Raleigh, North Carolina
- Coordinates: 35°46′38″N 78°38′23″W
- Area: 0.4 acres (0.16 ha)
- Built: 1876, 1902, 1952
- Architectural style: Renaissance, Classical Revival
- NRHP reference No.: 00000457
- Added to NRHP: November 29, 2000

Mahler and Carolina Trust Buildings, also known as McLellan's Dime Store and McCrory's Dime Store, are two historic commercial buildings located at Raleigh, North Carolina. The Mahler Building was built in 1876, and the Carolina Trust Building was built in 1902. They were consolidated as McLellan's Dime Store about 1933. A two-story annex was added to the building in 1952. The Mahler Building is a three-story, three-bay, Renaissance Revival-style brick building with round arched windows. The Carolina Trust Building is a four-story, three-bay, Classical Revival style brick building. The annex is a two-story, seven-bay, addition with Art Moderne design elements.

It was listed on the National Register of Historic Places in 2000. It is located in the Fayetteville Street Historic District.
