= Isabelle Bowen Henderson =

American portraitist and floriculturist

- Born: March 23, 1899; Raleigh, North Carolina; U.S.
- Died: 19 May 1969 (aged 70); Raleigh, North Carolina, U.S.
- Education: Peace College; Pennsylvania Academy of the Fine Arts
- Occupations: artist, gardener
- Spouse: Edgar H. Henderson
- Parent(s): Arthur Finn Bowen; Isabelle Woodward

Isabelle Bowen Henderson (March 23, 1899 – May 19, 1969) was an American portraitist and floriculturist. She taught art classes at various schools and at North Carolina State College and Wake Forest College. Specializing in crayon and oil paintings, she was commissioned to paint portraits of prominent figures including Frank Porter Graham and I. Beverly Lake Sr. She later helped establish the North Carolina Museum of Art. Henderson was a renowned gardener and received awards from the National Society of State Garden Clubs and the National Horticulture Society for her hybridization of the iris and hemerocallis.

Her home, the Isabelle Bowen Henderson House and Gardens in Raleigh, North Carolina, is listed on the National Register of Historic Places.

== Early life and education ==
Henderson was born Isabelle Bowen on March 23, 1899, in Raleigh, North Carolina. She was the daughter of Arthur Finn Bowen, the business manager of North Carolina State College, and Isabelle Woodward Bowen, a member of an old Wilmington family. She was one of six children.

She was educated in Raleigh public schools before attending Peace College, where she graduated in 1919. From 1921 to 1923, she spent summers studying art at Columbia University and the School of Fine and Applied Arts in New York City. From 1924 to 1925, she was a student at the Pennsylvania Academy of Fine Arts in Philadelphia.

== Career ==
=== Art ===
From 1919 to 1921, Henderson taught art at the Centennial School in Raleigh. She moved to Pennsylvania and taught at College Hill School in Easton from 1922 to 1924. She also taught art during the summer sessions at North Carolina State College and at Wake Forest College.

In 1936, Henderson opened an art studio in Raleigh and became known throughout Eastern North Carolina for her crayon portraits. In the 1940s, she continued painting in Raleigh and in Florida, where her husband was working as a professor. In addition to portrait commissions for wealthy North Carolinian families, Henderson was commissioned to paint oil portraits of University of North Carolina at Chapel Hill president Frank Porter Graham, North Carolina State College president Wallace Carl Riddick, North Carolina Supreme Court justice I. Beverly Lake Sr., and the public official Charles Carroll of the North Carolina Department of Public Instruction.

She was a member of the North Carolina Art Society and assisted in establishing the North Carolina Museum of Art. Henderson was partially responsible for the museum acquiring a collection of Jugtown Pottery. Some of her work is kept in the collection of the museum.

=== Gardening ===
Henderson's home in Raleigh became famous for her garden, which included a collection of iris and hemerocallis. Her hybridization of the two flowers led to her receiving the highest award of the National Society of State Garden Clubs in 1951 and recognition from the National Horticulture Society.

She was an active member of the Raleigh Garden Club and gave lectures to garden clubs throughout North Carolina.

== Personal life ==
She married Edgar H. Henderson in 1932 and moved to Williamstown, Massachusetts, where her husband served on the faculty at Williams College. She also spent time in Gainesville, Florida, where her husband served on the faculty at the University of Florida.

The Hendersons had one son, who died in infancy. Following their child's death, her husband suffered a nervous breakdown and was institutionalized.

The couple returned to Raleigh in 1936. Her father purchased a Victorian home on a 1.2-acre lot in the Oberlin Village neighborhood for Henderson and her husband to help them get back on their feet. Shortly after moving into the house, they separated. Henderson added three outbuildings to her residence to create a quadrangle, including an herb house and a two-car garage.
