= Alton Hornsby Jr. =

American historian, educator (1940–2017)

- Born: Alton Parker Hornsby Jr. September 3, 1940; Atlanta, Georgia, U.S.
- Died: September 1, 2017 (aged 76); Atlanta, Georgia, U.S.
- Education: Morehouse College (BA), University of Texas at Austin (MA, PhD)
- Occupations: Historian, professor, author, editor

Alton Parker Hornsby Jr. (September 3, 1940 – September 1, 2017) was an American historian, professor, author, and editor. He was a leading scholar of Black Southern history, and is a professor emeritus of history at Morehouse College, which was also his alma mater. Hornsby edited the Journal of Negro History for 25 years.

== Early life and education ==
Alton Parker Hornsby Jr. was born on September 3, 1940, in Georgia. He had five siblings and his parents were Lillie Mae Newton Hornsby, and Alton P. Hornsby. In the 1950s, his family owned Atlanta's "Greasy Food Café". He was a graduate of William H. Crogman School (named for William H. Crogman), attended the Booker T. Washington High School, and graduated from Luther J. Price High School in 1957.

Hornsby attended Morehouse College in Atlanta, Georgia, and received a bachelor's degree in history in 1961; and continued his studies at the University of Texas at Austin (UT Austin) and received a master's degree in 1962, and doctorate degree in history in 1969. He was the first African American to graduate with a PhD in the history department at UT Austin.

== Career ==
In his early career, Hornsby taught at Tuskegee University in Alabama from 1962 until 1965.

Hornsby taught history at Morehouse College for 40 years (1968–2010), and served as chair of the history department for 30 years. He was inducted into the Phi Beta Kappa in 1984, and appointed the Fuller E. Callaway professor of history in 1996. Hornsby was awarded the John W. Blassingame Award (John W. Blassingame) (2012) by the Southern Historical Association.

Hornsby was a leading African American history scholar, particularly of Georgia and the South, and wrote dozens of books and articles. His most noted books were Southerners, Too?: Essays on the Black South, 1733-1990 (2004), and Black Power in Dixie: A Political History of African Americans in Atlanta (2009).

Hornsby edited the Journal of Negro History (now The Journal of African American History) from 1976 to 2001. He also served as president of the Association of Social and Behavioral Scientists, an association of social science educators at colleges for African Americans, from 1984 to 1985.

== Death and legacy ==
Hornsby died at age 76 on September 1, 2017, in Atlanta.

The Auburn Avenue Research Library on African American Culture and History in Atlanta has a collection of his papers. The Georgia State University Library archive contains his photograph, which was used in a 1984 newspaper article. In 2006, Hornsby was interviewed about his role in the Atlanta Student Movement, and the video of the interview is available online and at the Atlanta History Center.

== Writings ==
- In the Cage. Eyewitness Accounts of the Freed Negro in Southern Society, 1877–1929 (1971), as editor
- The Black Almanac (1972)
- The Negro in Revolutionary Georgia (1977)
- Milestones In 20th-century African-American History (1993)
- Chronology of African American History (2000)
- Southerners, Too?: Essays on the Black South, 1733–1990 (2004)
- A Companion to African American History (2005)
- 'Zell We Hardly Knew Ye'; Zell Miller and the Politics of Region, Gender, Class, and Race 2000–2005 (2007)
- Black Power in Dixie: A Political History of African Americans in Atlanta (2009)
- African Americans in the Post-Emancipation South; The Outsiders' View (2010)
- Black America: A State-by-State Historical Encyclopedia (2011), two volumes
- A Short History of Black Atlanta, 1847–1993 (2015)
