= Historic overlay district =

A historic overlay district is a layer of local planning regulation in the United States which incorporates the restrictions of the underlying zoning for a given geographic area, with the main goal of preserving the historic character of the neighborhood.

== Early development ==
Historic overlay districts have been increasingly used as a more flexible tool for municipal historic regulation since their inception in the mid-twentieth century. Courts in all 50 states have generally upheld the powers of municipal governments to regulate property by use of overlay districts, and courts in many states, as well as the United States Supreme Court have upheld the use of historic overlay districts specifically.

The stated goal of most historic overlay districts is to preserve the overall historic atmosphere and appearance of a neighborhood as a whole, rather than merely spot-lighting specific buildings throughout a generally historic area.

== Historic district creation today ==
The creation of historic districts varies from state to state. Generally, however, district creation begins with a municipal zoning commission or historic preservation committee. Usual notices of public meetings are given and the acceptance of comments from affected citizens are generally heard, but in the end, the municipal governing body has the final say as to the creation of a historic overlay district. Many districts are accompanied by the creation of a Historic District Commission, to oversee the creation of specific regulations and appeals from such regulations by landowners.

In states that require strict adherence by municipal government to statutory grants of authority, an enabling statute must be in place expressly allowing the creation of historic overlay districts by towns, cities and counties. North Carolina, for instance, is a state with an enabling statute allowing its duly created municipal governments to create such districts.

== Challenges ==
Like most zoning ordinances, historic overlay districts and the decisions of local historic district commissions are frequently challenged by individual landowners seeking variances or permission to engage in new construction. As municipal governing bodies in most states are given a great deal of deference, however, direct challenges to such districts are not generally successful.

Landowners may be more successful in seeking variances or permission to engage in new construction by demonstrating either that a municipal body erred in its application of the zoning ordinance, or that the building at issue actually meshes well with the overall historic character of the district.
