= Wilmoth Carter =

American sociologist, professor

Wilmoth Annette Carter
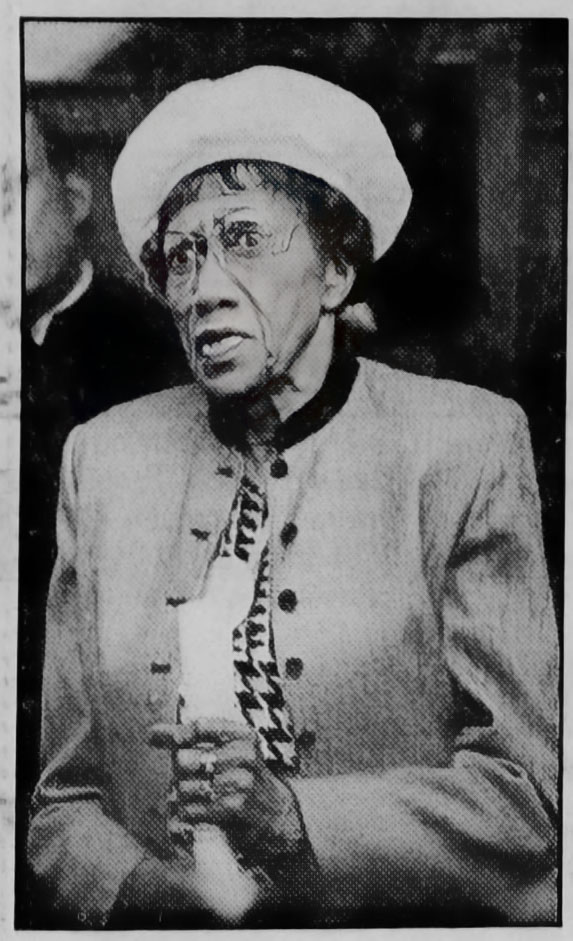
- Born: May 27, 1916; Reidsville, North Carolina, US
- Died: April 1, 1993 (aged 76); Raleigh, North Carolina, US
- Occupation: Sociologist
- Spouses: Never married

Wilmoth Annette Carter was an American sociologist, professor, and academic administrator. She was a faculty member at Shaw University, where she served as vice president of academic affairs from 1978 to 1986. Carter is known for her contributions to the study of African-American culture and urban sociology, as well as her dedication to education and civil rights.

== Early life and education ==
Wilmoth Annette Carter was born in Reidsville, North Carolina, in 1917. She received a Rosenwald grant and studied under W. E. B. Du Bois at Atlanta University, where she developed her interest in African-American studies. She earned her bachelor's degree in sociology from Shaw University in 1937 and later obtained her doctorate from the University of Chicago in 1959.

== Academic career ==
Carter spent most of her professional life at Shaw University, where she taught sociology and headed the division of social sciences. She later served in various administrative roles, including vice president of instruction, vice president of research and evaluation and finally senior vice president of academic affairs in 1978, a position she held until 1986. Known for her strict but supportive teaching style, Carter mentored students who went on to prominent careers as college presidents, politicians, and community leaders.

== Research and writing ==
Her research focused on the experiences of African Americans in the urban South, particularly the business district on East Hargett Street in Raleigh, North Carolina. Carter authored three significant works. The Urban Negro in the South is a sociological study that explores the economic, social, and cultural experiences of African Americans in Southern urban environments. The book builds on Carter's graduate research at the University of Chicago, originally titled "Negro Main Street of a Contemporary Urban Community." The study focuses on the concept of "Negro Main Street," exemplified by East Hargett Street in Raleigh, North Carolina, as a critical site for examining African American economic and social life. Through an analysis of business patterns, consumer behavior, and the spatial dynamics of segregation, Carter illustrates how urbanization and systemic discrimination shaped African American communities. Organized into five parts, the book examines the historical growth of Black-owned businesses, the impact of discriminatory practices on consumer spaces, and the cultural and ideological reflections within urban Black neighborhoods. It also delves into the broader social changes influenced by urbanization and racial ideologies.

In The new Negro of the South; a portrait of movements and leadership (1967), Carter presents a comprehensive examination of the ongoing struggles for justice, political equality, education, and social freedom faced by African Americans. She argues that the so-called "new Negro" is not a new phenomenon but a continuation of a long history of resistance, dating back to the early days of the United States. The Civil Rights movement, according to Carter, did not start in 1960 with the sit-ins but was rather a new phase of a persistent, multigenerational fight against injustice. She also addresses the challenges of keeping the civil rights movement nonviolent, especially as it gained wider participation. Carter notes that while the "black power" movement might inspire some, its more militant rhetoric risks alienating both sympathetic whites and moderate Black leaders, and could ultimately undermine the very goals it seeks to achieve.

Shaw's Universe (1973) is a socio-historical study of Shaw University.

Carter's work as an educator and advocate for preserving African American history and culture influenced and supported preserving the histories of African American communities, like the Raleigh's Roots project, and emphasized the importance of oral traditions, storytelling, and community memory. In 1985, Raleigh's City Council requested the Raleigh Historic Properties Commission to study the city's historic African American communities.

== Advocacy ==
Carter was a strong advocate for the civil rights movement and served on the mayor's advisory committee during the picketing of stores in Raleigh that refused to serve Black patrons. During the height of the civil rights movement, Carter supported her students' activism, even administering final exams to those jailed for protesting segregation.
