= City of Raleigh Museum =

History museum in Raleigh, North Carolina

- Location within North Carolina
- Established: 1990
- Location: Briggs Hardware Building, Raleigh, North Carolina
- Coordinates: 35.777659°N 78.639392°W
- Type: History Museum
- Owner: City of Raleigh
- Website: raleighnc.gov

The City of Raleigh Museum is a local history museum associated with Raleigh, North Carolina. The museum is located in the historic Briggs Hardware Building on Fayetteville Street in downtown Raleigh and has a number of exhibits and programs that are free to the public.

== History ==
The City of Raleigh Museum grew out of the dream of Raleigh historian Beth Crabtree and after her death, the vision and perseverance of Mary Cates. It was in 1990 that Mary Cates began bringing together a group of advocates for a city-based museum.

In 1991 widespread support was shown for the museum and initial steps were taken toward making the dream a reality. In 1993 the museum opened its first exhibit in the Borden Building in Fred Fletcher Park.

In 1998 the museum moved to the first floor of the newly restored Briggs Hardware Building on Fayetteville Street in the heart of downtown Raleigh. It has continued to serve at that location ever since.

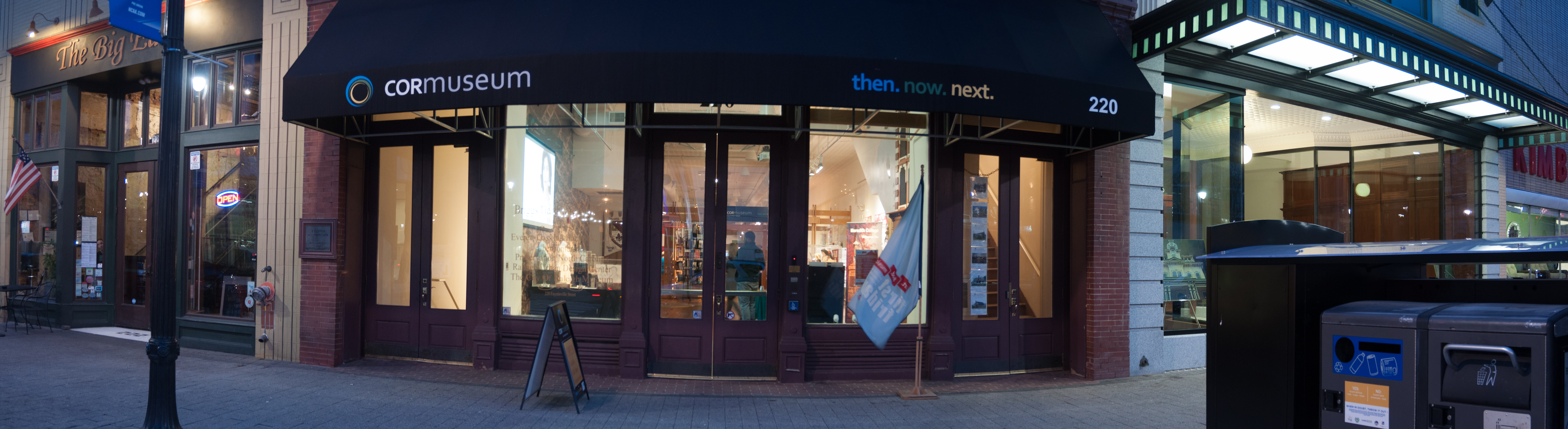
City of Raleigh Museum Entrance

== Purpose ==
The museum operated as a nonprofit until July 2012, when the City of Raleigh assumed operational control. While the City remains in charge of the museum, it is also supported by the nonprofit Friends of the COR Museum. The museum offers a variety of exhibits and educational programs on various aspects of the history of the city. It also maintains an extensive collection of Raleigh photographs and artifacts as a part of its service to the city.

== Friends of the COR Museum ==
The Friends supports the mission of the museum through fundraising and other initiatives. It is a 501c(3) organization that previously served as the board for the museum when it operated as a non-profit entity.
