= List of awards and nominations received by Evan Rachel Wood =

Evan Rachel Wood awards and nominations
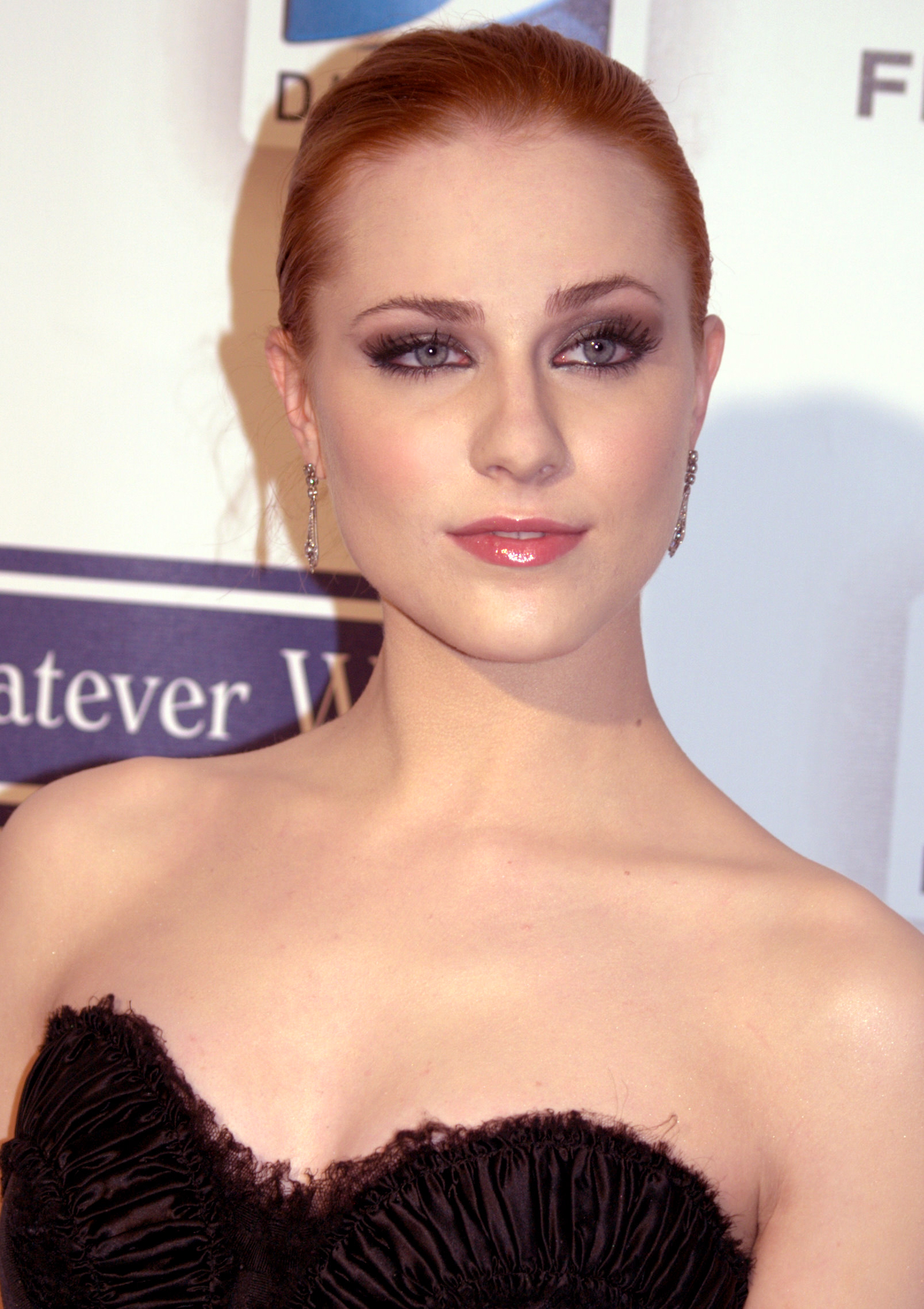
- Wood at the premiere of Whatever Works in 2009
Awards and nominations
| Award | Wins | Nominations |
| Alliance of Women Film Journalists | 1 | 1 |
| Bratislava International Film Festival | 1 | 1 |
| Critics' Choice Movie Awards | 0 | 2 |
| Critics' Choice Television Awards | 1 | 1 |
| Golden Globe Awards | 0 | 3 |
| IGN Awards | 0 | 1 |
| IGN People's Choice Awards | 1 | 1 |
| MTV Movie Awards | 0 | 1 |
| Primetime Emmy Awards | 0 | 3 |
| Satellite Awards | 1 | 3 |
| Saturn Awards | 0 | 1 |
| Screen Actors Guild Awards | 0 | 2 |
| Washington D.C. Area Film Critics Association | 0 | 1 |
| Whistler Film Festival | 1 | 1 |
| Women's Image Network Awards | 0 | 1 |
| Young Artist Awards | 1 | 5 |
| Young Hollywood Awards | 2 | 2 |
| YoungStar Awards | 0 | 2 |

Totals (Note: Certain award groups do not simply award one winner. They acknowledge several different recipients, have runners-up, and have third place. Since this is a specific recognition and is different from losing an award, runner-up mentions are considered wins in this award tally. For simplification and to avoid errors, each award in this list has been presumed to have had a prior nomination.)
- Wins: 9
- Nominations: 32

Evan Rachel Wood is an American actress and musician. After playing minor roles in several films and television shows, Wood starred in her breakthrough role in Catherine Hardwicke's teen drama Thirteen (2003). Her performance in the film garnered widespread critical acclaim and earned her nominations for the Golden Globe Award for Best Actress in a Motion Picture – Drama, the Screen Actors Guild Award for Outstanding Performance by a Female Actor in a Leading Role, and the Critics' Choice Movie Award for Best Young Performer. Wood starred in the 2011 television adaptation of James M. Cain's Mildred Pierce, which garnered her nominations for the Primetime Emmy Award for Outstanding Supporting Actress in a Limited Series or Movie and the Golden Globe Award for Best Supporting Actress – Series, Miniseries or Television Film.

For portraying Dolores Abernathy in the HBO series Westworld (2016–), based on the film of the same name and sequel of the film, she received two nominations for the Primetime Emmy Award for Outstanding Lead Actress in a Drama Series, the Golden Globe Award for Best Actress – Television Series Drama, and the Saturn Award for Best Supporting Actress on Television, and went on to win the Critics' Choice Television Award for Best Actress in a Drama Series. She also, along with the other Westworld cast members, received a nomination for the Screen Actors Guild Award for Outstanding Performance by an Ensemble in a Drama Series for the first season.

== Awards and nominations ==
| Award/Organization | Year | Category | Work | Result | Ref. |
|---|---|---|---|---|---|
| Alliance of Women Film Journalists | 2009 | Most Egregious Age Difference Between the Leading Man and the Love Interest | Whatever Works | Won | |
| Bratislava International Film Festival | 2003 | Special Mention | Thirteen | Won | |
| Critics' Choice Movie Awards | 2004 | Best Young Performer | Thirteen | Nominated | |
| Critics' Choice Movie Awards | 2012 | Best Acting Ensemble | The Ides of March | Nominated | |
| Critics' Choice Television Awards | 2016 | Best Actress in a Drama Series | Westworld | Won | |
| Golden Globe Awards | 2004 | Best Actress in a Motion Picture – Drama | Thirteen | Nominated | |
| Golden Globe Awards | 2012 | Best Supporting Actress – Series, Miniseries or Television Film | Mildred Pierce | Nominated | |
| Golden Globe Awards | 2017 | Best Actress – Television Series Drama | Westworld | Nominated | |
| IGN Awards | 2016 | Best Television Actress | Westworld | Nominated | |
| IGN People's Choice Awards | 2016 | Best Television Actress | Westworld | Won | |
| MTV Movie Awards | 2004 | Best Female Breakthrough Performance | Thirteen | Nominated | |
| Premiere Women in Hollywood Awards | 2006 | Spotlight Award for Emerging Talent | — | Won | |
| Primetime Emmy Awards | 2011 | Outstanding Supporting Actress in a Limited Series or Movie | Mildred Pierce | Nominated | |
| Primetime Emmy Awards | 2017 | Outstanding Lead Actress in a Drama Series | Westworld | Nominated | |
| Primetime Emmy Awards | 2018 | Outstanding Lead Actress in a Drama Series | Westworld | Nominated | |
| Satellite Awards | 2004 | Best Actress – Motion Picture | Thirteen | Nominated | |
| Satellite Awards | 2011 | Best Supporting Actress – Series, Miniseries or Television Film | Mildred Pierce | Nominated | |
| Satellite Awards | 2017 | Best Actress – Television Series Drama | Westworld | Won | |
| Saturn Awards | 2017 | Best Supporting Actress on Television | Westworld | Nominated | |
| Screen Actors Guild Awards | 2004 | Outstanding Performance by a Female Actor in a Leading Role | Thirteen | Nominated | |
| Screen Actors Guild Awards | 2017 | Outstanding Performance by an Ensemble in a Drama Series | Westworld | Nominated | |
| Washington D.C. Area Film Critics Association | 2003 | Best Actress | Thirteen | Nominated | |
| Whistler Film Festival | 2017 | Best Performance | Allure | Won | |
| Women's Image Network Awards | 2011 | Actress – Made for TV Movie / Mini-Series | Mildred Pierce | Nominated | |
| Young Artist Awards | 1999 | Best Supporting Young Actress in a Feature Film | Practical Magic | Nominated | |
| Young Artist Awards | 2000 | Best Supporting Young Actress in a TV Drama Series | Profiler | Nominated | |
| Young Artist Awards | 2001 | Best Ensemble in a TV Series – Drama or Comedy | Once and Again | Won | |
| Young Artist Awards | 2003 | Best Leading Young Actress in a Feature Film | Little Secrets | Nominated | |
| Young Artist Awards | 2004 | Best Leading Young Actress in a Feature Film | The Missing | Nominated | |
| Young Hollywood Awards | 2002 | One to Watch – Female | — | Won | |
| Young Hollywood Awards | 2009 | Young Hollywood Superstar | — | Won | |
| YoungStar Awards | 1999 | Best Young Actress in a Miniseries/Made for TV Film | Down Will Come Baby | Nominated | |
| YoungStar Awards | 2000 | Best Young Actress in a Drama TV Series | Once and Again | Nominated | |
