= Pullen Park =

Park in Raleigh, North Carolina

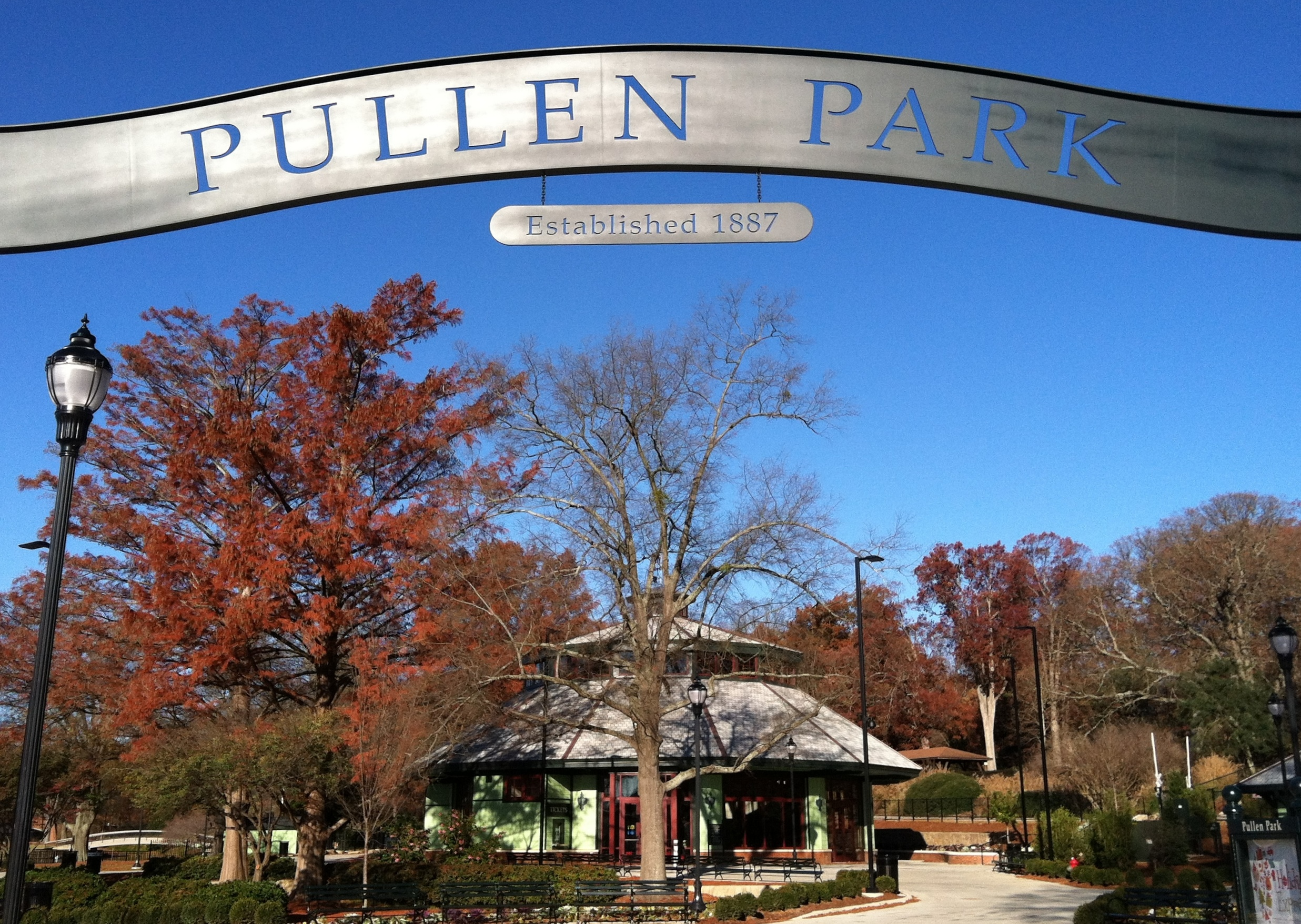
- Pullen Park entrance
- Interactive map of Pullen Park
- Location: 520 Ashe Avenue; Raleigh, North Carolina 27606
- Coordinates: 35.78036°N 78.66383°W
- Opened: March 22, 1887
- Owner: City of Raleigh
- Website: Official Website

Pullen Park is a 66.4-acre (0.27 km^{2}) public park immediately west of downtown Raleigh, North Carolina. It is located on Ashe Avenue and is adjacent to the Main and Centennial campuses of North Carolina State University, covering an area between Western Boulevard and historic Hillsborough Street. Founded in 1887, Pullen Park is the oldest public park in North Carolina.

The park features picnic areas, a concessions stand along with several small rides including the Pullen Park Carousel, train, and kiddie boats. Pedal boats are also available for rent seasonally on the park's small lake. The Pullen Aquatic Center, Pullen Arts Center and Theatre in the Park are also located on the park grounds. It is one of the most famous and well-known parks in the Research Triangle region.

The East Coast Greenway, a 3,000 mile long system of trails connecting Maine to Florida, runs through Pullen Park.

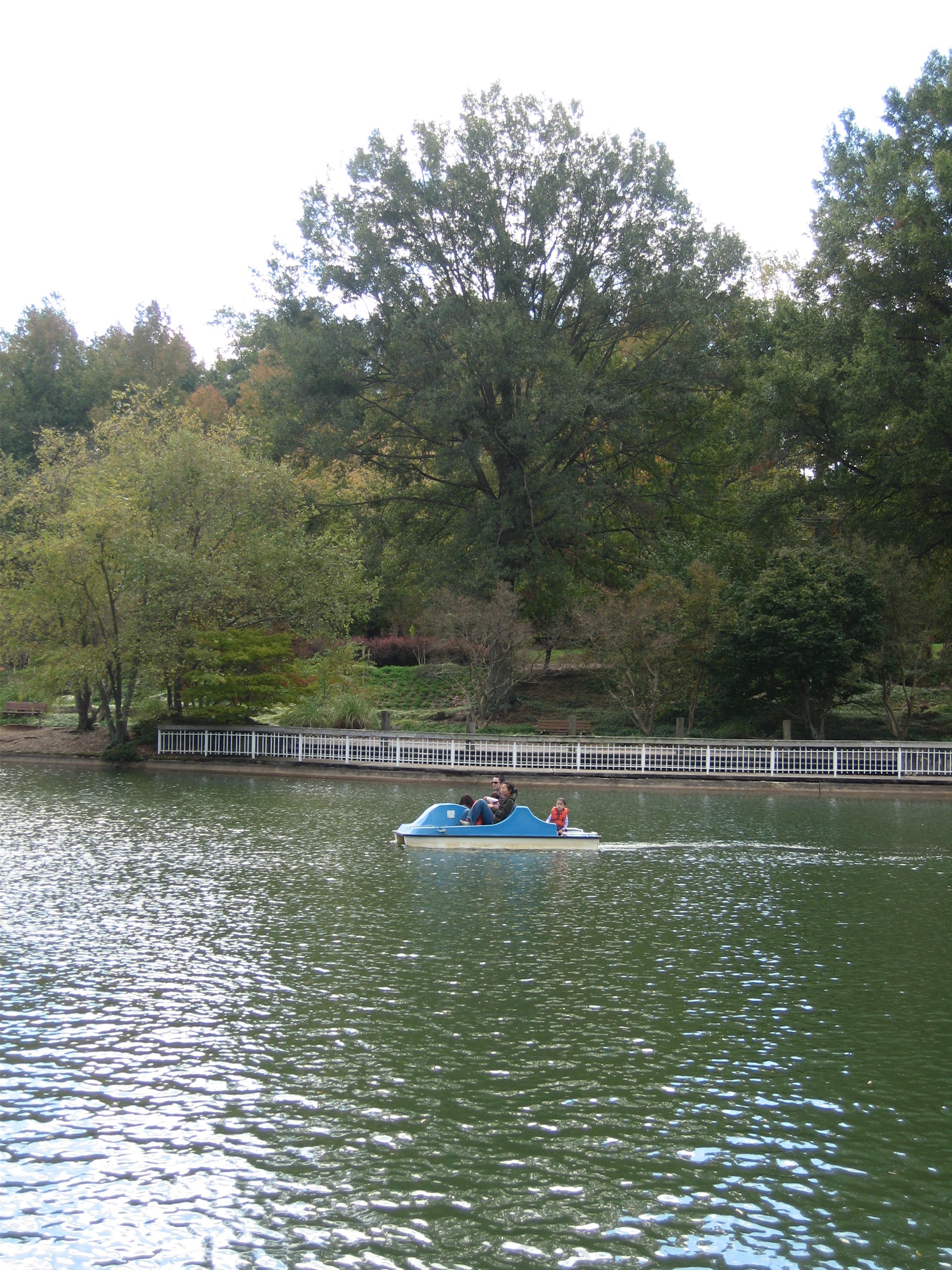
Paddle boats

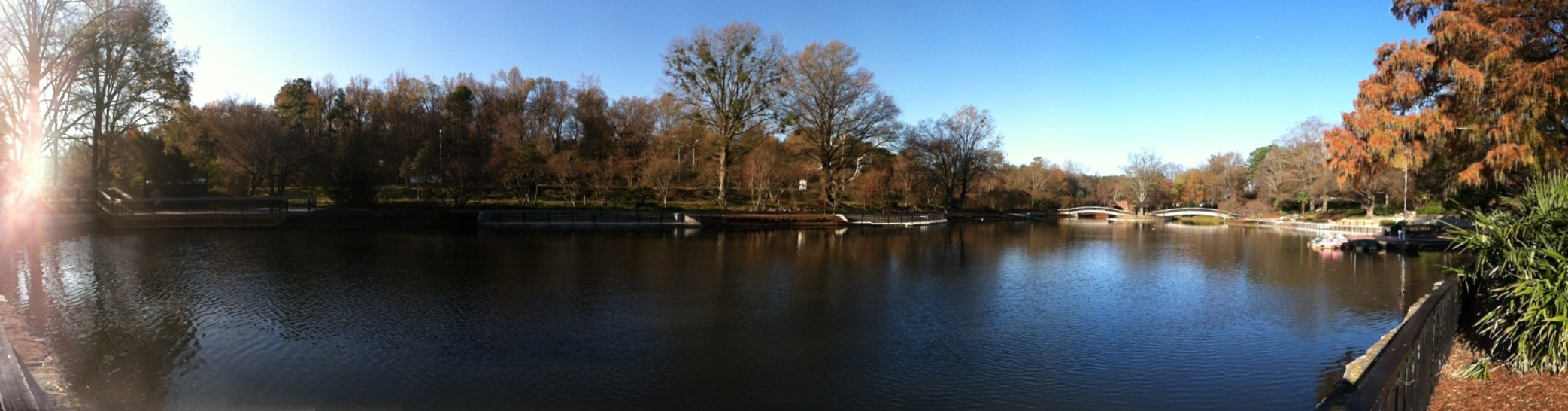
Pullen Park's Lake Howell

== History ==
Pullen Park was founded on March 22, 1887, when Richard Stanhope Pullen of Pullen Plantation donated farmland to the City of Raleigh expressly to be used as a space for recreational enjoyment of its citizens and visitors. This land became Pullen Park, the first public park in North Carolina, although its founder, always shying from thanks and publicity, opposed giving it his name. A "Committee on Public Parks" was formed to oversee the transformation from farmland to landscaped park and a Park Keeper was hired in 1888 to oversee these modifications. Pullen continued his own involvement by taking part in the planning and financing of bridges, roads and paths throughout the park as well as the planting of trees and general landscaping in the park and the neighboring NC State University which was built on land also donated by him. Pullen's landscape design was in keeping with the times. He also financed a round pavilion for outdoor entertainment and a fountain, located near the city's first swimming pool (for men only) in 1891. A congressman from another county donated fifty Japanese carp for the fountain which shows the significance of the park even outside of Raleigh. In 1895 modifications to the structure and regulations of the pool allowed for its use by women. The pool remained in the same place until it was replaced by the Pullen Aquatic Center in 1992 (see: Aquatic Center).

In addition to the many attractions in the park today, there was also a small zoo on site from 1899 to 1938. The park's original steam-powered merry-go-round was replaced by the current carousel in 1921. The zoo was created following a national trend to incorporate zoological parks in public parks which began in the latter quarter of the nineteenth century. Beginning with only two raccoons, the collection soon grew in size and variety and by 1903 included an Australian owl, mink, bears, alligators and monkeys and many other species. The zoo eventually closed, most likely due to the death of the Park Keeper, Wiley Howell, who had maintained the zoo and is the namesake for the park's Lake Howell.

The original merry-go-round was purchased for $350 in 1914 from the W.D. Chase Bottling Works of Galesburg, Illinois. It began operating in 1915 but apparently it was in poor condition because the city decided to purchase a replacement Dentzel carousel only five years later. (see: Carousel)

Although baseball was unofficially played in Pullen Park for many years – perhaps even before the land became a park - the officially sanctioned field was not created until the unofficial field was renovated in 1920. A second field was added later.

In 2000 the city began making plans to update the park to accommodate Raleigh's growing population and later invited the citizens to take part in the plans. Over the past several years many changes have been made, including the removal of an iconic 'Swiss cheese' play structure and other playground equipment. More notable, however, is the new entrance and additional parking that make the park more accessible to more people.

Although Jim Crow laws during that era prohibited African-Americans from using some of the park's facilities (e.g. the swimming pool), the park's main areas were open to everyone, and African-Americans in the community were not denied access to the park overall.

According to the census of the National Amusement Park Historical Association, Pullen Park is the 14th oldest amusement park in the world.

The park was closed from December 14, 2009, to November 18, 2011 for extensive renovations including a new, climate-controlled carousel house, welcome center, concessions building, restroom facilities, and train station. Site improvements include a new entrance, event spaces, playground, underground utilities and picnic shelters. Additionally, Lake Howell was drained and dredged for regular lake maintenance and to allow for updates including a new boat dock and apron and the installation of a geothermal energy system.

== Founder ==
Richard Stanhope Pullen was born on September 18, 1822, to Turner and Elizabeth Smith Pullen on a small family farm in Wake County, NC. Little is known about his early life and education, and even in his later life he shied from the press and recognition. However, it is known that as a young man he began working for his uncle, Richard Smith, in Raleigh. Eventually Pullen inherited quite a large sum of money from his uncle and began embarking on developing Raleigh through business endeavors as well as philanthropic projects. His land and monetary donations contributed to the development of city roads, and what later became Peace College, UNC Greensboro, NC State University, Edenton Street United Methodist Church and, of course, Pullen Park. He remained actively involved in planning and funding improvements to the park until his death in 1895. No monument or plaque was erected on park ground commemorating his contributions until 1992, as the city feared that this use would violate the clause that stipulated that the land must be used for recreational purposes. The most recognizable monument to Richard Stanhope Pullen for Raleigh residents is the obelisk on the Pullen family plot in Raleigh's Oakwood Cemetery. In addition, Pullen Hall at NC State University was named in his honor.

== Attractions ==
In addition to several swing sets, sand areas and other various playground equipment for children of all ages, the park also features lighted tennis courts, two ball fields, a lake with paddle boats, covered and uncovered picnic areas, many picturesque paths and bridges, the Aquatic Center, Arts Center and Theatre in the Park.

The Aquatic Center and Arts Center both offer classes to all ages in physical fitness, swimming and arts and crafts (pottery, jewelry making, weaving, glass art, etc.) Plays are performed on a regular basis at the internationally acclaimed Theatre in the Park.

=== Pullen Aquatic Center ===
Pullen Aquatic Center, completed in 1992, is one of four city-run, public year-round aquatic centers in Raleigh. It features an Olympic size swimming pool, a warm water therapy pool, a mezzanine with spectator seating, an outdoor patio, and locker room facilities. The center is open for swimming laps as well as recreational swimming and offers water exercise programs, aquatic therapy programs, a city swim league, and American Red Cross Learn-to-Swim lessons, lifeguard training, and instructor-level classes.

The Aquatic Center is also used for several local, state, and regional swimming and diving competitions each year, including the Special Olympics of the annual State Games of North Carolina which are held in May/June. It is located on Ashe Avenue adjacent to Pullen Park.

=== Pullen Arts Center ===
Pullen Arts Center offers classes in pottery, jewelry-making, painting, printmaking, weaving, and glass arts. The center has extensive studios and equipment, as well as instructors and knowledgeable staff to help both the accomplished artist and the novice. The Arts Center also hosts a summer camp program called Art4Fun for children, and special events and gallery exhibits are held throughout the year.

=== Theatre in the Park ===
Theatre in the Park was originally chartered in 1947. The name was changed in the early 1970s. This air conditioned indoor theatre facility, located in the northern end of the park, includes a beautiful Season Member Lounge, administrative offices, costume shop, technical workshop, dressing rooms, lobby and a flexible 'black box' performance space. Year-round programming includes no less than four mainstage productions, classes, workshops and independent productions. The theatre is internationally acclaimed and well known locally for Ira David Wood III's musical comedy adaption of Charles Dickens' "A Christmas Carol," an ongoing annual production since 1974.

=== Andy Griffith Statue ===
Although monuments and statues have traditionally been avoided due to the clause that stipulates that the land must only be used for recreational purposes, in 2003 the cable television network TV Land permanently loaned a statue of Andy and Opie Taylor depicting a well known scene from The Andy Griffith Show. The addition of this statue was controversial, as citizens of Mount Airy, North Carolina, which the fictional town of Mayberry was ostensibly based on, believed that the statue should be in their town as opposed to Raleigh. The statue has been vandalized several times and its plaque stolen. The statue was slightly redesigned to prevent further damage. A second statue of Andy and Opie was later erected in Mount Airy outside the Andy Griffith museum.

=== Red Caboose ===
A real Norfolk Southern Railway 380 bay window red caboose with a Southern Railway paint scheme is displayed in the park for children to explore.

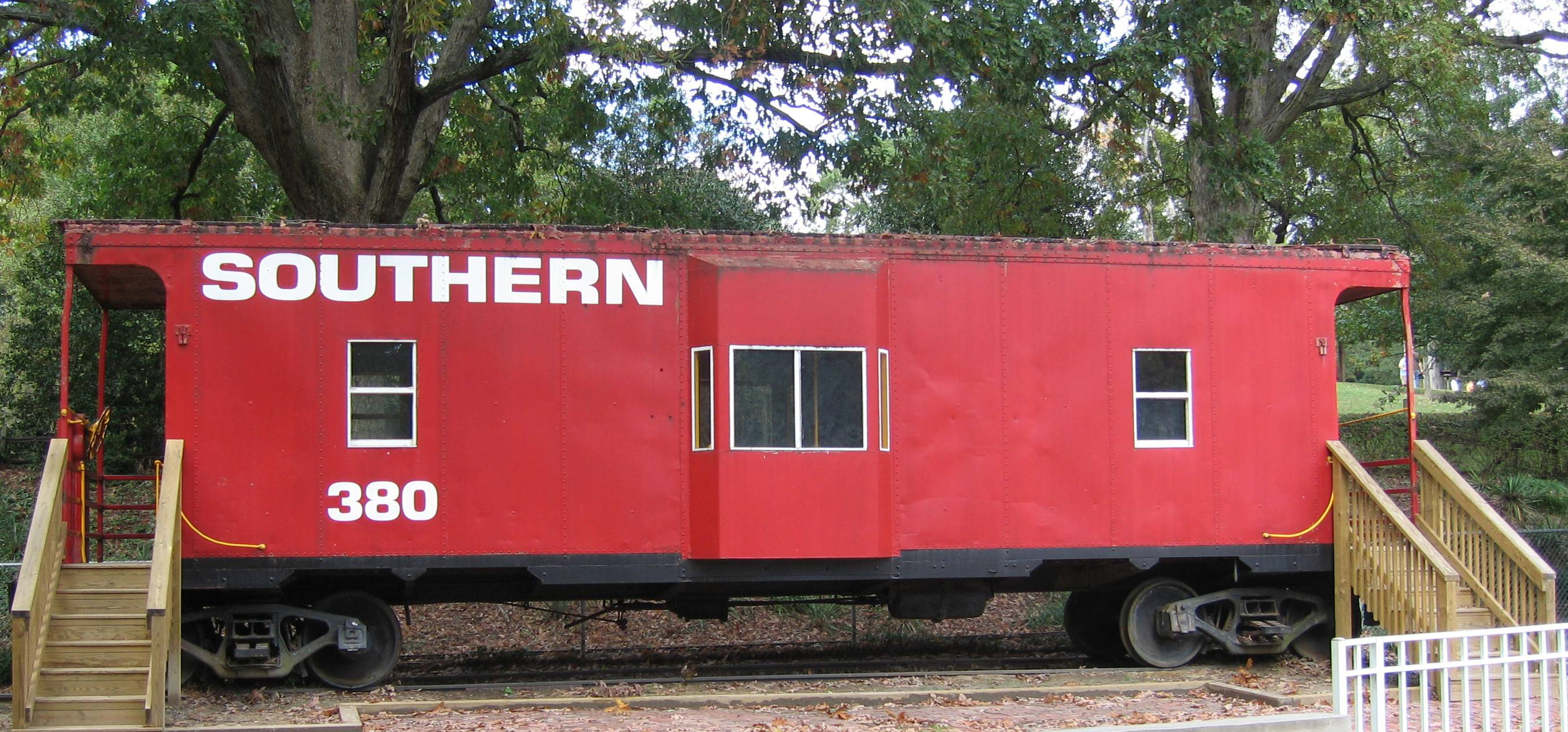
Red Caboose

== Rides ==
The park features four rides with a nominal charge for each. Tickets are purchased from the office near the park entrance. Adults are welcome on all rides with the exception of the kiddie boats.

=== Kiddie Boats ===
The kiddie boats, which are intended only for small children, circle in a small pool at a leisurely pace.

=== Paddle Boats ===
Lake Howell's Pedalos are available for rental by the half hour. There must be one person aged 16 or older aboard, and the paddle boats can accommodate up to four people each. Life jackets are available.

=== Miniature Train ===
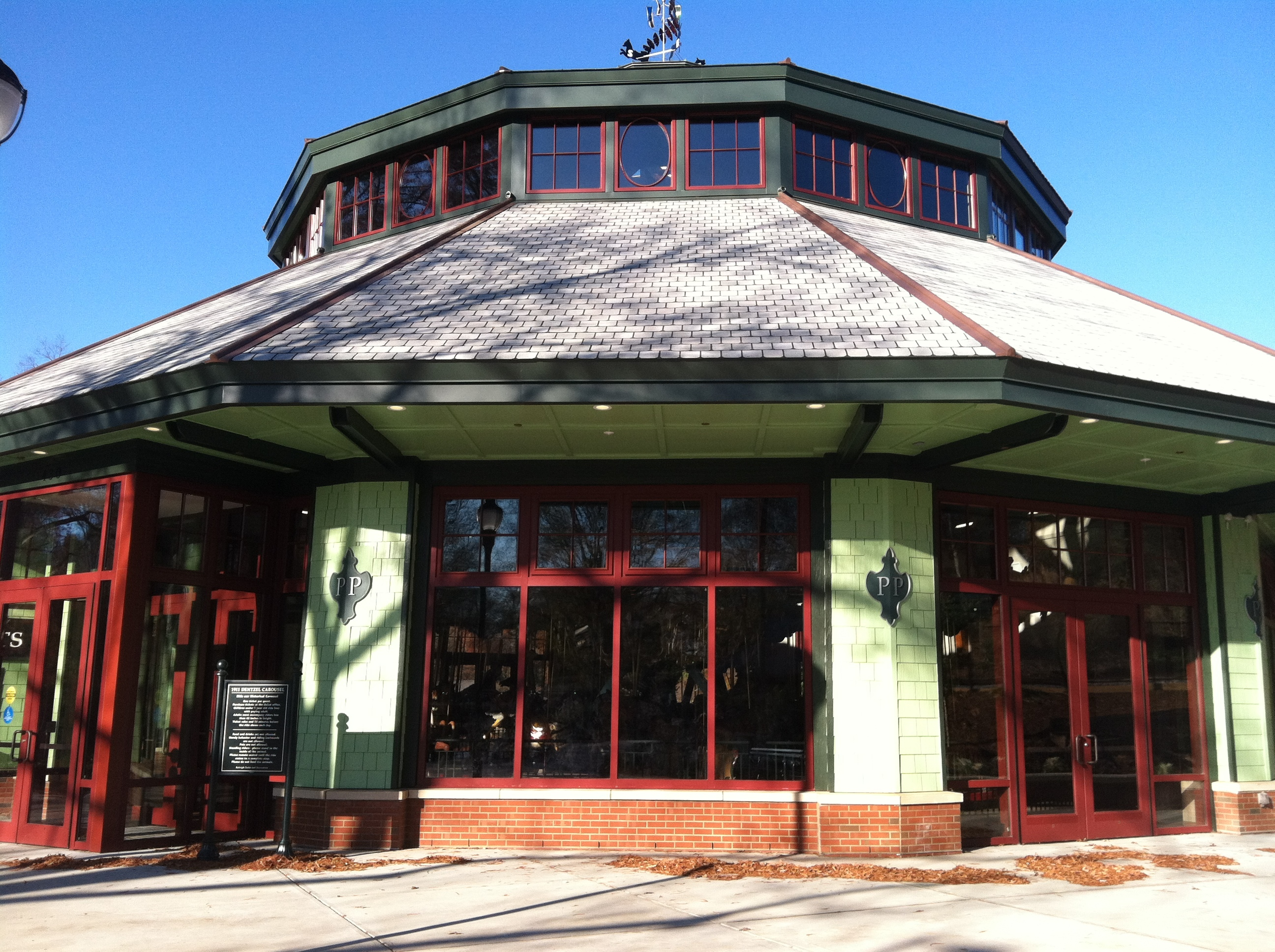
Carousel house after 2011 renovations

A miniature train, added to the park in 1950, goes through a tunnel and around the park. The tunnel and a second train were added in 1971. The C.P. Huntington Train is a 2 ft (610 mm) narrow gauge, one-third sized operational miniature train that has thrilled children of all ages since it was added to the park. The engine is a near exact replica of a locomotive that was built in 1863 at the Danforth-Cook Locomotive works in Paterson, New Jersey, which eventually found its way to San Francisco (by way of Cape Horn) when it was purchased by Central Pacific Railroad where C.P. Huntington was then Vice President. On April 9, 1864, it was christened the C.P. Huntington C.P. #3 after its first run. The locomotive was slated to be scrapped in 1914 but was saved, restored and renamed. It now resides in Sacramento, CA.

=== Carousel ===
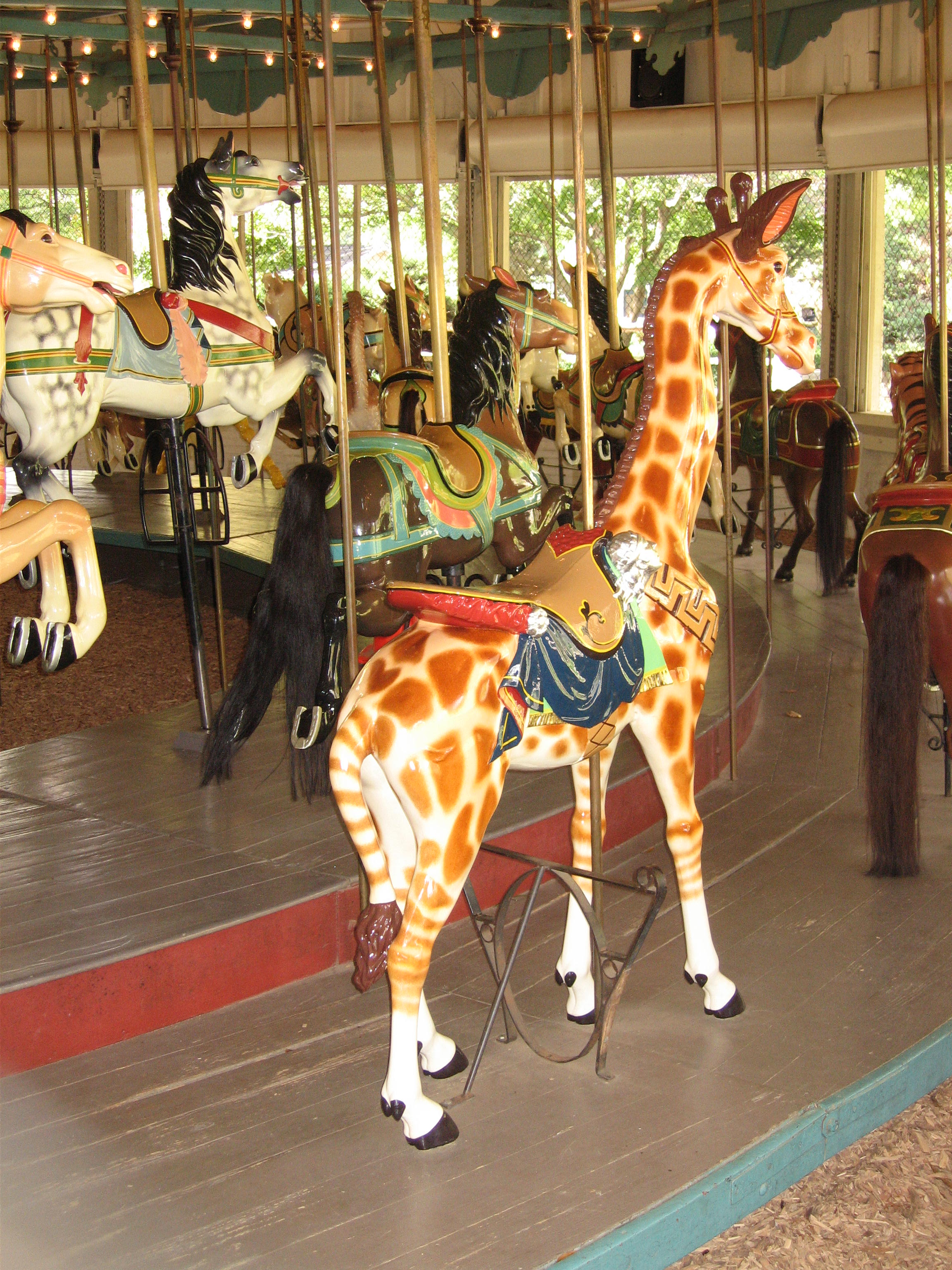
Carousel animals

The Pullen Park Carousel was made c. 1912 by master carver Salvatore Cernigliaro of the Dentzel Carousel Company of Germantown, Pennsylvania. It contains 52 hand-carved basswood animals, 2 chariots (or sleighs), 18 large gilded mirrors and 18 canvas panels and a Wurlitzer 125 organ made in 1924 by the Rudolph Wurlitzer Company of North Tonawanda, New York. The Dentzel Carousel Company was the first American carousel company and while thousands of carousels were made in the U.S., there are only approximately 200 antique carousels left today. Fewer than 25 of those are Dentzel carousels, and only 14 of those remain in operation. Unfortunately, the carousel is often closed for repairs — a small price to pay to continue to be able to enjoy this beautiful antique ride when it is in good working condition. Many generations of park visitors have enjoyed riding a giraffe, pony or ostrich on the carousel as a child and continue to pass that tradition along to their own children. The carousel is considered to be the park's most popular attraction.

This particular carousel was originally located in Bloomsbury Park (also in Raleigh near what is now known as Five Points) and was moved to Pullen Park in 1921 when the Raleigh City Board (now City Council) voted to replace the park's original steam powered antique merry-go-round. Bloomsbury Park, an amusement park founded by Carolina Power & Light (CP&L), was apparently in financial trouble and Pullen Park was able to acquire the carousel for only $1,425 — one tenth of its original cost. Despite the bargain purchase, this city expenditure angered many Raleigh residents at the time but they soon acquiesced after the new carousel began operation.

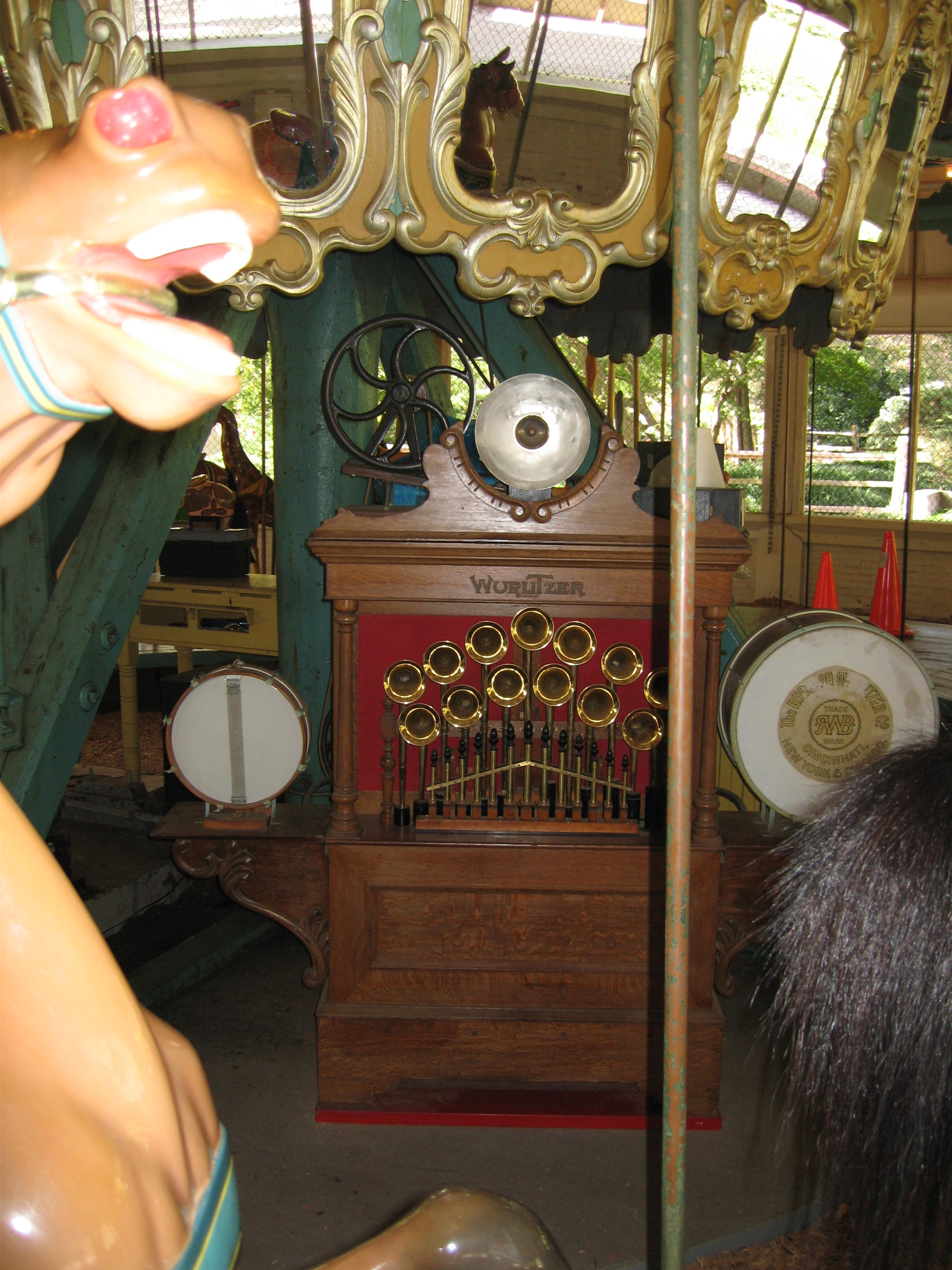
Carousel Wurlitzer

In 1971, Richard Norton estimated the cost of restoration to be $400 per animal. The current carousel underwent major restoration from 1977 to 1982, during which time the original factory paint was uncovered, documented and conserved. It was the first time such a restoration attempt had been made. Each hard carved animal was restored to its exact Munsell Color System paint color, preserving the original paint underneath a layer of shellac while enabling the animals to look just as they were originally painted (#sign).

In 1976 the carousel was added to the National Register of Historic Places, and it is also a designated Raleigh Historic Landmark.
