= Evan Rachel Wood =

American actress (born 1987)

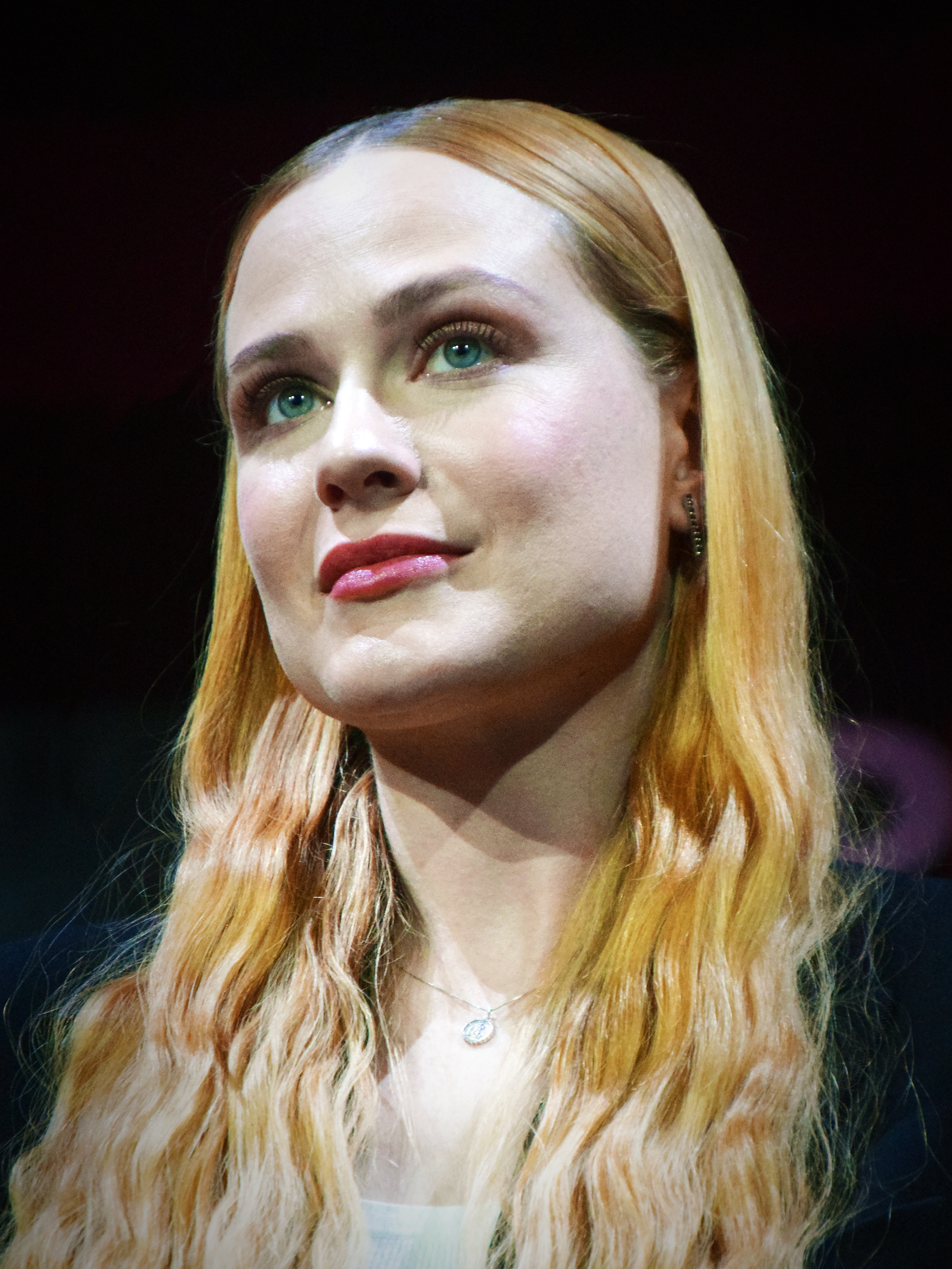
- Wood in 2022
- Born: September 7, 1987 (age 39); Raleigh, North Carolina, U.S.
- Occupations: Actress singer
- Years active: 1993–present
- Spouse: Jamie Bell (m. 2012; div. 2014)
- Children: 1
- Father: Ira David Wood III
- Awards: Full list

Evan Rachel Wood (born September 7, 1987) is an American actress and singer. She is the recipient of a Critics' Choice Television Award as well as nominations for three Primetime Emmy Awards and three Golden Globe Awards.

She began acting in the 1990s, appearing in several television series, including Once and Again (1999–2002). She expanded to films at the age of nine in Digging to China (1997), appeared in Practical Magic in 1998, and garnered praise for her Golden Globe-nominated role as Tracy Freeland, a troubled teenager in the drama film Thirteen (2003). After starring in several independent films, Wood appeared in more mainstream films, including The Wrestler (2008), Whatever Works (2009), and The Ides of March (2011).

She returned to television in the recurring role of Sophie-Anne Leclerq on True Blood from 2009 to 2011. She appeared in the HBO miniseries Mildred Pierce (2011), for which she was nominated for the Golden Globe and Emmy Award for Best Supporting Actress. She starred as sentient android Dolores Abernathy in the HBO series Westworld (2016–2022), for which she won a Critics' Choice Award and earned Golden Globe and Emmy Award nominations. Wood had a voice role in the Disney animated film Frozen 2 (2019), and portrayed Madonna in Weird: The Al Yankovic Story (2022).

== Early life and family ==
Wood was born in Raleigh, North Carolina, on September 7, 1987. Her mother, Sara Lynn Moore, is an actress, director, and acting coach. Her father, Ira David Wood III, is an actor, theater director and playwright prominent in Raleigh, where he is the co-founder and executive director of a community theatre company called Theatre in the Park. Wood's brother, Ira David Wood IV, is also an actor; she has two other brothers, Dana and Thomas, and a sister named Aden. Her paternal aunt, Carol Winstead Wood, was a production designer in Hollywood.

Of having a traditionally masculine given name, Wood has said: "My mother had a dream that she was gonna have a daughter with blond hair and blue eyes named Evan, so that was just my name."

Wood was actively involved in Theatre in the Park while growing up, including an appearance in the 1987 production of her father's musical comedy adaptation of A Christmas Carol when she was a few months old. She subsequently played the Ghost of Christmas Past in several productions there, and starred as Helen Keller alongside her mother (as Anne Sullivan) in The Miracle Worker, under her father's direction.

She attended Cary Elementary School in Cary, North Carolina, where she starred in its production of The Little Mermaid. When her parents divorced, she moved with her mother to Los Angeles in 1997 to further her acting career. She attended public school in California before leaving at age 12 for homeschooling. She received her high school diploma at 15. Wood said she earned a black belt in taekwondo when she was 12, and that she participated in the AAU Junior Olympic Games.

== Career ==
=== 1993–2000: Early work ===
Wood began her career appearing in several television films that were shot in her native North Carolina from 1993 onwards. She made her acting debut at the beginning of that year in Sondra Locke's Death in Small Doses. She had recurring roles in the television series American Gothic (1995–1996) and Profiler (1998–1999), receiving a nomination for Best Supporting Young Actress in a TV Drama Series at the 21st Young Artist Awards for the latter.

Wood's first major screen role was in the 1997 film Digging to China, as a ten-year-old girl living with her alcoholic mother, played by Cathy Moriarty, who forms an unlikely friendship with a man with intellectual disability, played by Kevin Bacon. It was shot in Western North Carolina and won the Children's Jury Award at the Chicago International Children's Film Festival. Wood remembers the role as initially hard, but that it "eventually led to her decision that acting is something she might never want to stop doing." The following year she had a role in Practical Magic, a fantasy film, for which she was nominated for Best Supporting Young Actress at the 20th Young Artist Awards. It was followed by the 1999 made-for-television thriller Down Will Come Baby, for which she was nominated for the YoungStar Award for Best Young Actress in a Mini-Series/Made for TV Film.

From 1999 to 2002, Wood was a regular on the ABC television family drama Once and Again in the role of Jessie Sammler. Her character dealt with her parents' divorce, anorexia, and falling in love with her best friend Katie, played by Mischa Barton, in what became the first teen lesbian pairing on network television. For her performance as Jessie, Wood was nominated for the YoungStar Award for Best Young Actress, and won Best Ensemble in a TV Series along with her co-stars Julia Whelan and Meredith Deane, at the 22nd Young Artist Awards.

=== 2001–2005: Breakthrough ===
Wood made her teenage debut as a leading film actress in 2001's Little Secrets, directed by Blair Treu, where she played 14-year-old aspiring concert violinist Emily Lindstrom. For that role, she was nominated for Best Leading Young Actress at the 24th Young Artist Awards. Wood next played a supporting role in Andrew Niccol's 2002 satirical science fiction film Simone. That same year, Wood was recognized as One to Watch at the Young Hollywood Awards.

Wood's breakout film role followed with Catherine Hardwicke's 2003 film Thirteen. She starred as Tracy Louise Freeland, a young teen who sinks into a downward spiral of hard drugs, sex, and petty crime. Her performance garnered critical acclaim, earning her Golden Globe and Screen Actors Guild nominations for Best Lead Actress. During the time of Thirteen's release, Wood was featured on the cover of Vogue, with the magazine naming her as one of the "It Girls" of Hollywood. She similarly appeared, along with eight other teen actresses, on the cover of Vanity Fair's Young Hollywood issue in July 2003. A supporting role in Ron Howard's The Missing, in which she played the kidnapped daughter Lilly Gilkeson, followed the same year, earning her a nomination for Best Leading Young Actress at the 25th Young Artist Awards.

In 2005, Wood appeared in the Mike Binder-directed The Upside of Anger, a well-reviewed film in which Wood played Lavender "Popeye" Wolfmeyer, one of four sisters dealing with their father's absence. Her character narrated the film. Wood's next two starring roles were in dark independent films. In the 2005 Sundance Film Festival Grand Jury Prize nominee Pretty Persuasion, a black comedy focusing on the themes of sexual harassment in schools and attitudes about women in media and society, Wood played Kimberly Joyce, a manipulative, sexually active high-schooler. One critic commented, "Wood does flip cynicism with such precise, easy rhythms and with such obvious pleasure in naughtiness that she's impossible to hate." David Jacobson's neo-western Down in the Valley premiered later that year, in which Wood's character, Tobe, falls in love with an older man, played by Edward Norton, a cowboy who is at odds with modern society. Of her performance, it was written that "Wood conveys every bit of the adamant certainty and aching vulnerability inherent in late adolescence." Wood has commented on her sexually themed roles, saying that she is not aiming for the "shock factor" in her film choices. Also in 2005, Wood starred in the music videos for Bright Eyes' "At the Bottom of Everything" and Green Day's "Wake Me Up When September Ends".

=== 2006–2008: Independent films ===
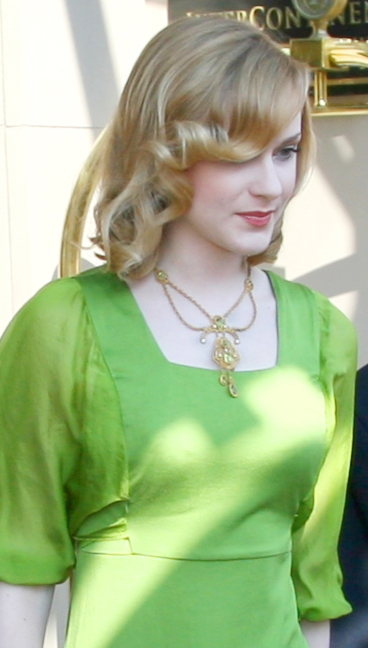
Wood at the 2007 Toronto International Film Festival

By 2006, Wood was described by The Guardian as being "one of the best actresses of her generation." Later that year, she received the Spotlight Award for Emerging Talent at Premiere magazine's annual Women in Hollywood gala. Also in 2006, Wood appeared with an all-star ensemble cast as Natalie Finch in the comedy-drama film Running with Scissors. Directed by Ryan Murphy and starring Annette Bening, the film was based on the memoir by Augusten Burroughs, which is a semi-autobiographical account of Burroughs' childhood in a dysfunctional family.

Wood had roles in two films released in September 2007. King of California, which premiered at the Sundance Film Festival, tells the story of a bipolar jazz musician (Michael Douglas) and his long-suffering teenage daughter, Miranda (Wood), who are reunited after his two-year stay in a mental institution and who embark on a quixotic search for Spanish treasure. One review praised Wood's performance as "excellent." The second film was Across the Universe, Julie Taymor's jukebox musical set to the songs of the Beatles that was nominated for the Golden Globe Award for Best Musical or Comedy. Set during the counter-cultural revolution of the 1960s, Wood played Lucy, an American teen who develops a relationship with her brother's British friend Jude (Jim Sturgess). The film featured her singing musical numbers, and she has described the role as her favorite. One critic wrote that "Wood brings much-needed emotional depth."

Wood provided the voice of an alien named Mala in Battle for Terra, a 2007 animated science fiction film about a peaceful alien planet that faces destruction from colonization by the displaced remainder of the human race. The film won the 2008 Grand Prize at the Ottawa International Animation Festival. The film was screened at the San Francisco International Film Festival, where she received an award at the Midnight Awards. Also in 2007, Wood starred in the Vadim Perelman-directed The Life Before Her Eyes, based on the Laura Kasischke novel of the same name, about the friendship of two teens of opposite character who are involved in a Columbine shooting-like incident at their school and are forced to make an impossible choice. Wood played the younger version of Uma Thurman's character, Diana. One critic cited her performance as "hands-down extraordinary." Wood stated that she intended the film to be the last one in which she played a teenager.

The following year, she co-starred in Darren Aronofsky's The Wrestler, winner of the Golden Lion Award for Best Film at the Venice Film Festival, about Randy "Ram" Robinson (Mickey Rourke), a professional wrestler from the 1980s who is forced to retire after a heart attack threatens to kill him the next time he wrestles. Wood played Stephanie, Robinson's estranged daughter. Of her performance, one critic wrote, "Once her character stops stonewalling her father and hears him out, Wood provides a fine foil for Rourke in their turbulent scenes together."

=== 2009–present: Further film and television career ===
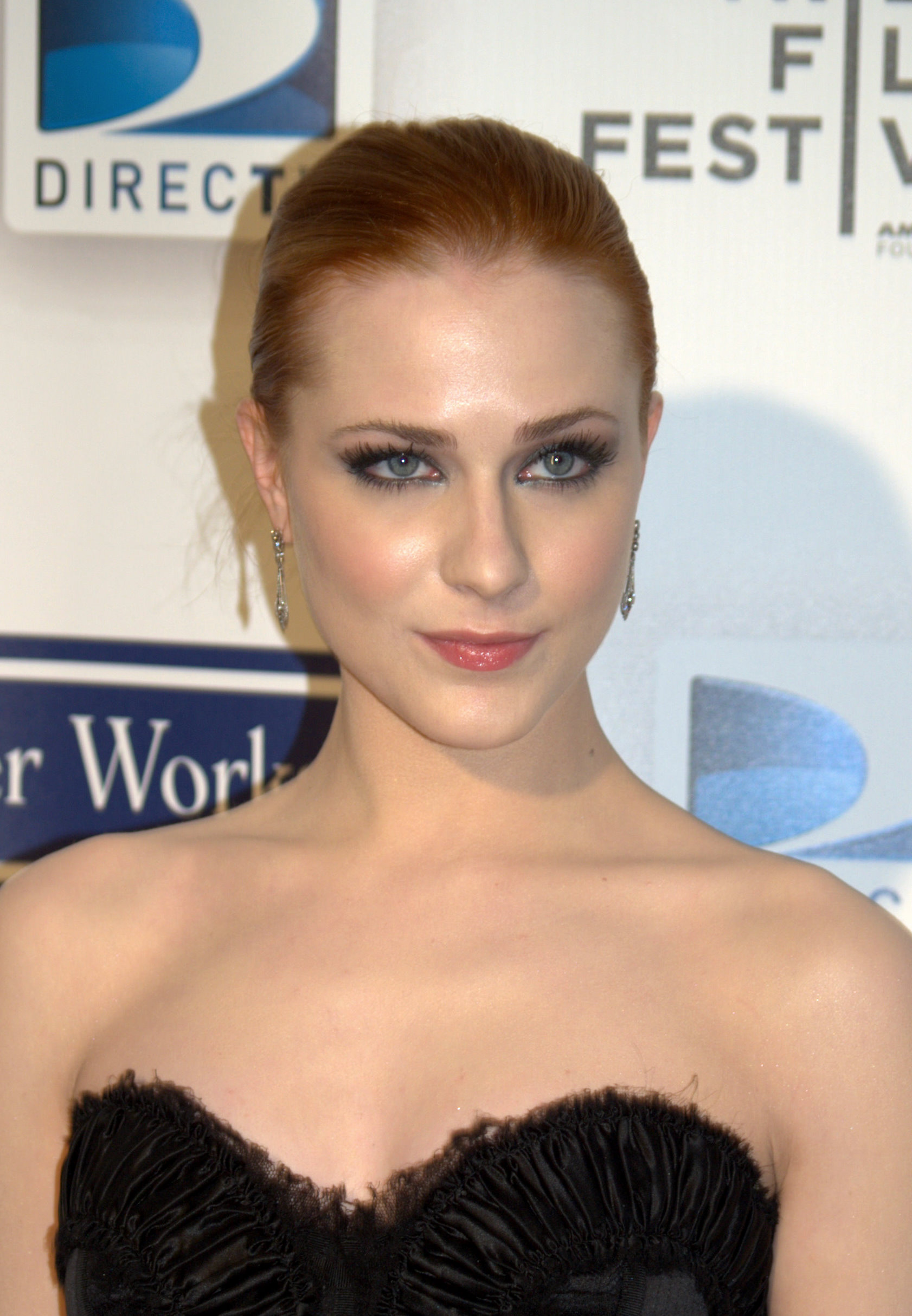
Wood at the premiere of Whatever Works in April 2009

Wood co-starred in Woody Allen's Whatever Works, which premiered at the 2009 Tribeca Film Festival, playing the young wife of Larry David's character. She later expressed regret for taking the role and that she would not work with Allen again. In May 2009, she played Juliet in six fundraising performances of William Shakespeare's Romeo and Juliet at the Theater In The Park; the production was directed by her brother Ira, who also starred. That same year, Wood was named Young Hollywood Superstar at the Young Hollywood Awards.

Wood had a recurring role in the second and third seasons of the HBO supernatural drama series True Blood, from 2009 to 2011, as Sophie-Anne Leclerq. Wood had a role in the film The Conspirator, which premiered at Ford's Theatre in Washington, D.C., in April 2011, directed by Robert Redford (about the conspiracy surrounding the assassination of Abraham Lincoln). She also had a role in The Ides of March. She portrayed the title character's daughter in the 2011 HBO miniseries Mildred Pierce, for which she was nominated for the Golden Globe Award and the Primetime Emmy Award for Best Supporting Actress.

In late 2012 she began filming 10 Things I Hate About Life, a followup to the hit 1999 teen comedy 10 Things I Hate About You in which she and Thomas McDonell played a couple who meet while attempting suicide. Filming was suspended when she became pregnant with her son; when it resumed again in 2013 Wood left the production, claiming she had not been paid beyond her $300,000 advance since the production company had not been able to raise enough money to pay her for the filming already completed. In response they sued her for $30 million.

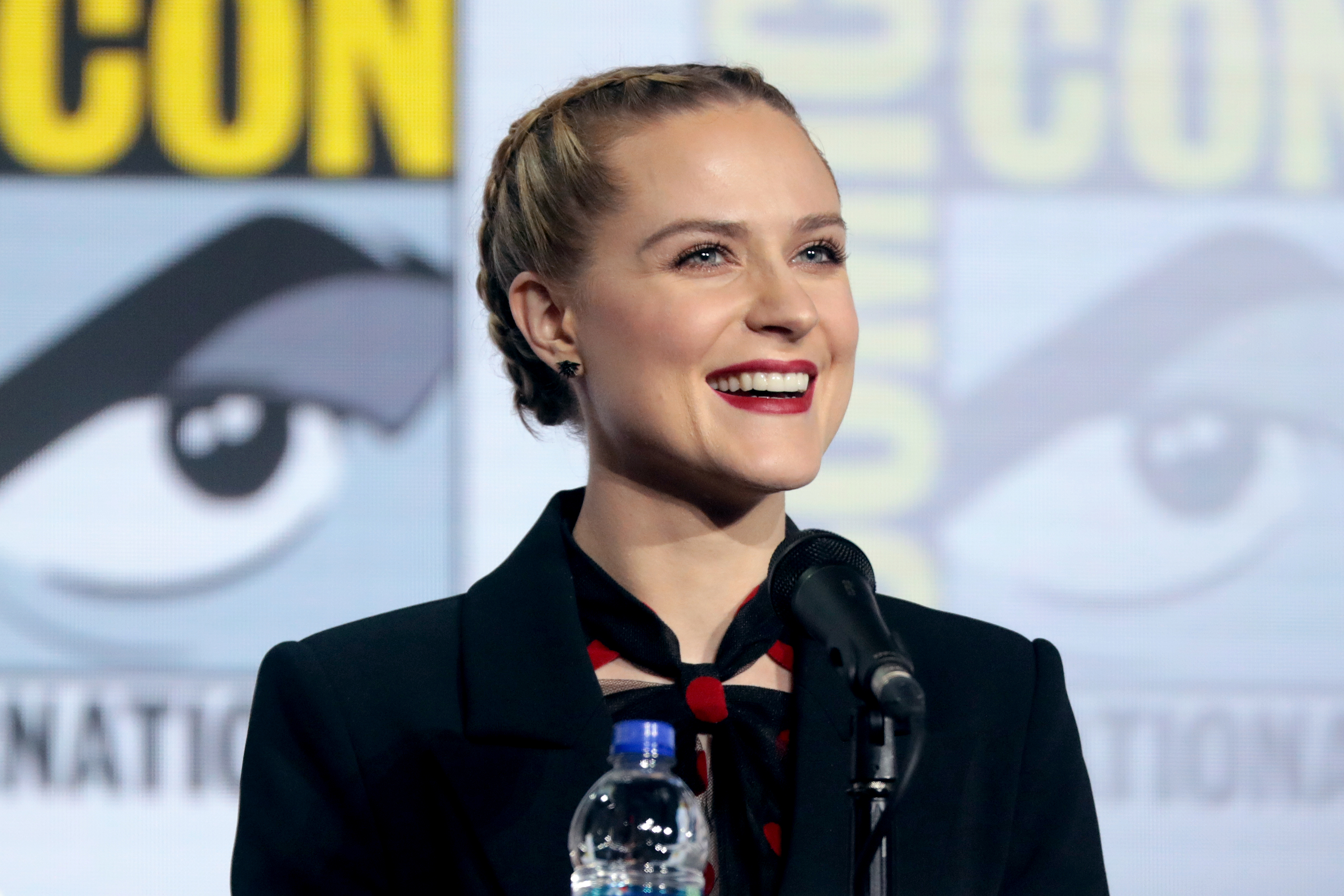
Wood in 2019

Wood starred with Chris Evans in a 2010 ad campaign filmed by Frank Miller for Gucci Guilty Eau fragrances. They reprised their roles for additional ads in 2013 and 2016. Wood played Gabi in the 2013 psychological romantic thriller film Charlie Countryman with Shia LaBeouf and Rupert Grint. She voiced Marianne in the 2015 film Strange Magic.

In 2016, Wood began starring as sentient android Dolores Abernathy in the HBO science fiction Western series Westworld. Her performance was praised as "spectacular", "tour-de-force, turn-on-a-dime", as well as "a tremendous technical achievement".

In August 2019, Wood announced on Twitter and D23 Expo that she was cast to voice Queen Iduna in Frozen II. The film was released in November 2019 to commercial success. She later featured in Kajillionaire in 2020, and Backspot in 2023. In January 2023, a workshop reading for Thelma & Louise was held starring Wood along with Amanda Seyfried.

In 2024, she began starring in the Off-Broadway musical revival Little Shop of Horrors.

== Other ventures ==
=== Music ===
In 2012, Wood recorded "I'd Have You Anytime" which is on the fourth CD of Chimes of Freedom: The Songs of Bob Dylan Honoring 50 Years of Amnesty International, a compilation production for the benefit of the organization. She performed as electro-pop duo, Rebel and a Basketcase, with multi-instrumentalist Zach Villa in 2016. The duo disbanded in August 2017. Wood is one-half of cover band Evan + Zane, which she formed with guitarist/singer-songwriter Zane Carney in 2018. Evan + Zane put out their first CD, called Dreams, in December 2022.

Wood appeared on the Billboard Hot 100 for the first time in 2019 when "Show Yourself", the duet she sang with Idina Menzel from the Frozen II soundtrack, debuted on the chart at number 99. The song peaked at number 70.

=== Activism ===
In June 2016, the Human Rights Campaign released a video in tribute to the victims of the Orlando nightclub shooting; in the video, Wood and others told the stories of the people killed there.

In February 2018, she testified before the United States House Judiciary Subcommittee on Crime, Terrorism, Homeland Security and Investigations in support of the Sexual Assault Survivors' Bill of Rights Act. In April 2019, she testified before the California State Senate to help pass the Phoenix Act, which extended the statute of limitations in domestic violence cases from three to five years and requires police to have additional training. In her testimony, Wood said she had been physically, sexually and emotionally abused by a former boyfriend, who she later identified as singer Marilyn Manson, and that she had subsequently been diagnosed with complex post-traumatic stress disorder.

=== Public statements ===
In 2016, Wood defended Amber Heard amid media coverage of her divorce from Johnny Depp, criticizing reports that focused on Heard's bisexuality and arguing that her sexuality was irrelevant to allegations of abuse. Following the Depp v. Heard trial in 2022, Wood expressed concern about online harassment directed at survivors and shared a report by Bot Sentinel alleging coordinated harassment campaigns targeting Heard and others who had spoken publicly about abuse. However, she clarified that her comments were not an endorsement of Heard's legal claims, but a criticism of media coverage that she felt misrepresented her position.

Following Hayden Panettiere's death in August 2026, Wood paid tribute to her former child-star peer while warning about the pressures faced by children in Hollywood, urging greater protection for young performers.

=== Controversies ===
Hours after the death of Kobe Bryant, Wood wrote a message on Twitter describing him as a "rapist", a reference to his 2003 sexual assault allegations. Bryant's widow, Vanessa Bryant, criticized Wood for the comment, and Wood deleted her Twitter account soon after.

== Personal life ==
Wood's mother is a convert to Judaism, and she has said that she was "raised with the religion." In 2012, she stated, "I believe in God but I am not religious. I am spiritual. My definition of God isn't in any religion. It's very personal."

Wood dated English actor Jamie Bell between 2005 and 2006. In January 2007, her relationship with Marilyn Manson became public; Wood was the inspiration for Manson's song "Heart-Shaped Glasses (When the Heart Guides the Hand)" and appeared in the song's music video. They became engaged in January 2010, but ended their relationship seven months later.

In 2011, Wood publicly disclosed that she is bisexual, and rekindled her relationship with Jamie Bell. They were married in October 2012 and had a son in July 2013. In May 2014, they announced their separation. By 2015, Wood was in a relationship with her bandmate Zach Villa. They were engaged in January 2017 and called it off that September. Starting in 2020, Wood and Bell were in dispute over the custody of their son. Bell said he was deprived of contact with him when Wood moved from Los Angeles to Nashville; Wood claimed she did this to protect the child from former fiancé Marilyn Manson. Bell argued in court that Wood's story "defies credibility", and accused her of "withholding our son from me for other reasons of her own invention." In May 2023, the two agreed the child would live primarily with Bell in Los Angeles, with Wood having visitation for "one extended weekend per month," and certain holidays.

=== Marilyn Manson abuse allegations ===
In 2016, Wood told a Rolling Stone reporter she had been raped twice years earlier, once by a "significant other". In February 2021, Wood named Manson as her alleged abuser on Instagram, where four other women made similar allegations against him. Wood made other allegations against Manson and his wife Lindsay Usich on Instagram, claiming that his alleged abuse included antisemitism, and that she filed a report with the Los Angeles Police Department against Usich for threatening to leak photographs of Wood dressed in a Nazi uniform while wearing an Adolf Hitler-style toothbrush moustache. Sixteen women have made accusations against Manson, and four have sued him for sexual assault. The Los Angeles County Sheriff's Department said they were investigating Manson due to allegations of domestic violence. In September 2022, the LACSD presented the report of their 19-month investigation on Manson to Los Angeles County district attorney George Gascón. Gascón called the file "partial", and said more evidence was needed in order to file charges.

In March 2022, HBO released the docuseries Phoenix Rising, focusing on these allegations and the circumstances that led Wood, who was 18 at the time, to enter a relationship with the then-37-year-old Manson. That month, Manson filed a lawsuit against Wood for defamation, intentional infliction of emotional distress, violations of the California Comprehensive Computer Data Access and Fraud Act, as well as impersonation of an FBI agent and falsifying federal documents. In May 2023, a judge dismissed a part of the lawsuit that involved an FBI letter, which Wood denied forging, and another that alleged Wood and another woman named as a defendant, Illma Gore, created a checklist for other women to use to accuse Manson of abuse. In 2024, Manson dropped his lawsuit and agreed to pay Wood's legal fees.

In January 2025, following a four-year criminal investigation of the sexual abuse and domestic violence allegations by the Los Angeles County Sheriff's Department, the Los Angeles district attorney's office declined to file charges against Marilyn Manson, citing a lack of evidence and the statute of limitations. While Nathan Hochman, the district attorney of Los Angeles, said he "acknowledged the courage of the women who spoke up", he said the decision was "necessitated by the facts and evidence in this matter".

In April 2026, Wood said she continues to experience intimidation and harassment years after accusing Manson of abuse, saying "I still get followed by cars. I still have phishing attempts on my computer. I still have numbers calling me over and over again."

== Filmography ==
=== Film ===
Year	Title	Role	Notes
1997	Digging to China	Harriet Frankovitz	
1998	Practical Magic	Kylie Owens	
1998	Detour	Daniella Rogers	
1999	Down Will Come Baby	Robin Garr	
2001	Little Secrets	Emily Lindstrom	
2002	Simone	Lainey Christian	
2003	Thirteen	Tracy Louise Freeland	
2003	The Missing	Lily Gilkeson	
2005	Pretty Persuasion	Kimberly Joyce	
2005	The Upside of Anger	Lavender "Popeye" Wolfmeyer	
2005	Down in the Valley	October "Tobe"	
2006	Asterix and the Vikings	Abba (voice)	Original version
2006	Shark Bait	Cordelia (voice)	
2006	Running with Scissors	Natalie Finch	
2007	King of California	Miranda	
2007	The Life Before Her Eyes	Young Diana McFee	
2007	Battle for Terra	Mala (voice)	
2007	Across the Universe	Lucy Carrigan	
2008	The Wrestler	Stephanie Ramzinski	
2009	Whatever Works	Melodie St. Ann Celestine	
2010	The Conspirator	Anna Surratt	
2011	The Ides of March	Molly Stearns	
2013	Charlie Countryman	Gabi Ibanescu	
2013	A Case of You	Birdie Hazel	
2014	Barefoot	Daisy Kensington	
2014	10 Things I Hate About Life	Willow	Incomplete, unfinished and unreleased
2015	Strange Magic	Marianne (voice)	
2015	Into the Forest	Eva	
2017	Allure	Laura Drake	
2018	Flavors of Youth	Yi Lin (voice)	Segment: "Chiisana Fashion Show"; English version
2019	Frozen 2	Queen Iduna (voice)	
2020	Kajillionaire	Old Dolio Dyne	
2020	Showbiz Kids	Self	Documentary
2020	Viena and the Fantomes	Susi	
2022	Weird: The Al Yankovic Story	Madonna	Also executive producer
2023	Backspot	Eileen McNamara	
2026	The Narcissist's Playbook	Self	Documentary

=== Television ===
Year	Title	Role	Notes
1994	In the Best of Families: Marriage, Pride & Madness	Little Susie	Television film; credited as Evan Wood
1994	Search for Grace	Young Sarah / Robin	Television film; credited as Evan Wood
1995	A Father for Charlie	Tessa	Television film
1995	Death in Small Doses	Anna	Television film; credited as Evan Wood
1995–1996	American Gothic	Rose Russell	3 episodes
1997	Get to the Heart: The Barbara Mandrell Story	Jaime Dudney – Age 8	Television film
1998–1999	Profiler	Chloe Waters	6 episodes
1999	Down Will Come Baby	Robin Garr	Television film
1999–2002	Once and Again	Jessie Sammler	Main cast; 55 episodes
2000	Touched by an Angel	Sarah Radcliff	Episode: "Pandora's Box"
2002	The West Wing	Hogan Cregg	Episode: "The Black Vera Wang"
2003	CSI: Crime Scene Investigation	Nora Easton	Episode: "Got Murder?"
2009–2011	True Blood	Sophie-Anne Leclerq	8 episodes
2011	Mildred Pierce	Veda Pierce	Miniseries; 2 episodes
2013	Robot Chicken	Travis' Girlfriend / Mother (voice)	Episode: "Botched Jewel Heist"
2015	Doll & Em	Evan	5 episodes
2016–2022	Westworld	Dolores Abernathy / Christina	Main role; 4 seasons
2018–2019	Drunk History	Various	2 episodes
2019	What We Do in the Shadows	Evan the Immortal Princess of the Undead	Episode: "The Trial"
2022	Phoenix Rising	Herself	
2025	Marilyn Manson: Unmasked	Herself	3 part Channel 4 series
2026	The Shards	Liz Schaffer	

=== Music video ===
Year	Title	Artist	Ref(s)
2005	"Wake Me Up When September Ends"	Green Day	
2005	"At the Bottom of Everything"	Bright Eyes	
2007	"Heart-Shaped Glasses (When the Heart Guides the Hand)"	Marilyn Manson	
2010	"Love Me Chase Me"	Carney	
2012	"I'd Have You Anytime"	Herself	
2015	"Can't Deny My Love"	Brandon Flowers	
2019	"Uneventful Days"	Beck	
2020	"Can I Be Your Friend ft. Evan Rachel Wood"	Chevy Mustang	
2021	"11:11"	Ben Barnes	

== Awards and nominations ==
Wood has won a Critics' Choice Television Award, a Satellite Award, and a Young Artist Award, and has been nominated for three Golden Globe Awards, three Primetime Emmy Awards, and two Screen Actors Guild Awards.
