= Theatre in the Park =

Coordinates: 35°47′4″N 78°39′45″W

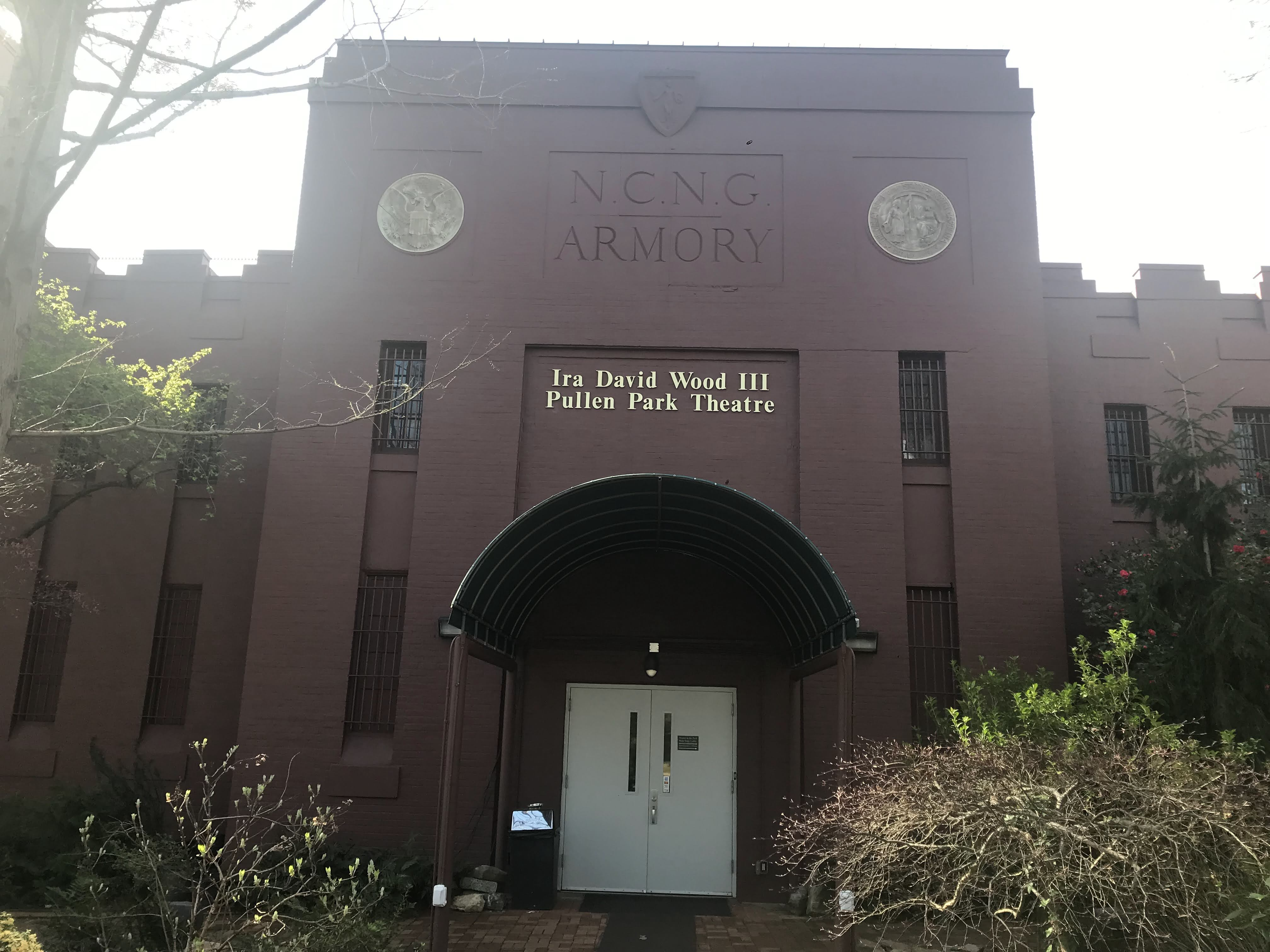
The Theatre in the Park in Raleigh, North Carolina

Theatre in the Park is a community theatre located in Raleigh, North Carolina. The theatre's Executive Director is Ira David Wood III, father of actress Evan Rachel Wood. Ira David Wood III is known for his musical adaptation of Charles Dickens' A Christmas Carol, in which he has played Ebenezer Scrooge for all but one of its yearly productions since 1974. Theatre in the Park has a history of unexplained activity. The Ghost Guild Inc., a registered nonprofit organization, has been serving as their exclusive paranormal research team since 2016.

== History ==
Originally chartered in 1947, TIP began as The Children's Theatre of Raleigh, Inc. During the early 1970s, its name was changed to Theatre In The Park in order to reflect its expanded programming, location and new "home" in the National Guard Armory building located in Raleigh's Pullen Park. The theatre is indoor, air conditioned, and has a seating capacity of approximately 250. In 2004, the facility was renamed "The Ira David Wood III Pullen Park Theatre," to reflect the decades of work done by its executive director, Ira David Wood III.
