= WakeMed =

Healthcare system based in Raleigh, North Carolina

Coordinates: 35.7847°N 78.5879°W

WakeMed Health and Hospitals
- Type: Healthcare
- Founded: 1961
- Headquarters: Raleigh, North Carolina, United States
- Number of locations: 3 hospitals, 8 outpatient facilities
- Area served: Wake County, North Carolina
- Key people: Donald R. Gintzig (CEO)
- Number of employees: 8,000 +
- Website: http://www.wakemed.org/

WakeMed Health and Hospitals is a 1,003-bed healthcare system with multiple facilities placed around the metropolitan Raleigh, North Carolina, area. WakeMed's main campus is located on New Bern Avenue in Raleigh. WakeMed serves multiple counties throughout the state and specializes in a variety of services including cardiology, gastroenterology, neurology, orthopedics, high-risk pregnancy, children's care, trauma, physical rehabilitation and critical care transport.

== History ==
The construction of a publicly financed hospital for Wake County, North Carolina, was approved via a voter-authorized bond issue in 1955. Memorial Hospital of Wake County, today known as WakeMed Raleigh Campus, opened in 1961 with 380 beds and 50 doctors. Though originally a public hospital, WakeMed is currently a private, not-for-profit corporation that operates many facilities in and around Wake County.

As of March, 2020, WakeMed is the only provider of the following services in Wake County:

- Level I Trauma Center as designated by the North Carolina Office of Emergency Medical Services.
- Licensed rehabilitation hospital.
- Level IV Neonatal Intensive Care Unit and one of seven Harvard developmental training sites.
- Neuro intensive care unit and dedicated neurosciences inpatient unit.
- Children's intensive care unit.
- Children's diabetes and asthma programs.
- Pediatrics specialists in surgery, neurology, endocrinology, orthopaedics, neonatology, child development and more.
- Women's Pavilion and Birthplace - Cary
- Emergency Services Institute focusing on research, emergency preparedness and response in the event of community emergencies and disaster either natural or man-made.
- Patient Simulation Center for training health professionals.

== Facilities ==
=== WakeMed Raleigh Campus ===
WakeMed's largest campus, based in Raleigh, houses six adult intensive care units, a same-day surgery center, two 24-hour emergency departments, one for adults and another for children, an 84-bed rehabilitation hospital, a Women's Pavilion & Birthplace, a 48-bed neonatal intensive care nursery, physician practices through WakeMed Faculty Physicians, laboratories and diagnostic services.

=== WakeMed Cary Hospital ===
WakeMed Cary Hospital, located in Cary, North Carolina, opened in 1991 as Western Wake Medical Center. It is a 156-bed hospital with 24-hour emergency services, a same-day surgery center, a Women's Pavilion & Birthplace, an intensive care unit, imaging services, and a sleep center specializing in diagnosing and treating sleep disorders.

=== WakeMed North Hospital ===
In May 2015, Wakemed Health and Hospitals upgraded their North Healthplex facility into a full hospital, specializing in women's and children's services. The 61-bed facility will provide comprehensive OBGYN support. It is located on Falls of Neuse Road in north Raleigh, built on land that was once the Pullen Plantation.

=== Outpatient facilities ===
In addition to its three full service hospitals, WakeMed operates several outpatient facilities that include freestanding emergency departments. The stand-alone emergency department locations include:

- WakeMed Brier Creek Medical Park, located in the Brier Creek area between Raleigh and Durham
- WakeMed Apex HealthPlex, located in Apex
- WakeMed Garner HealthPlex, located in Garner, North Carolina
- WakeMed Wendell Emergency Department in Wendell, North Carolina

The system also has multiple outpatient rehab locations in and around Wake County.
