= Pullen House =

Historic plantation house in Raleigh, North Carolina

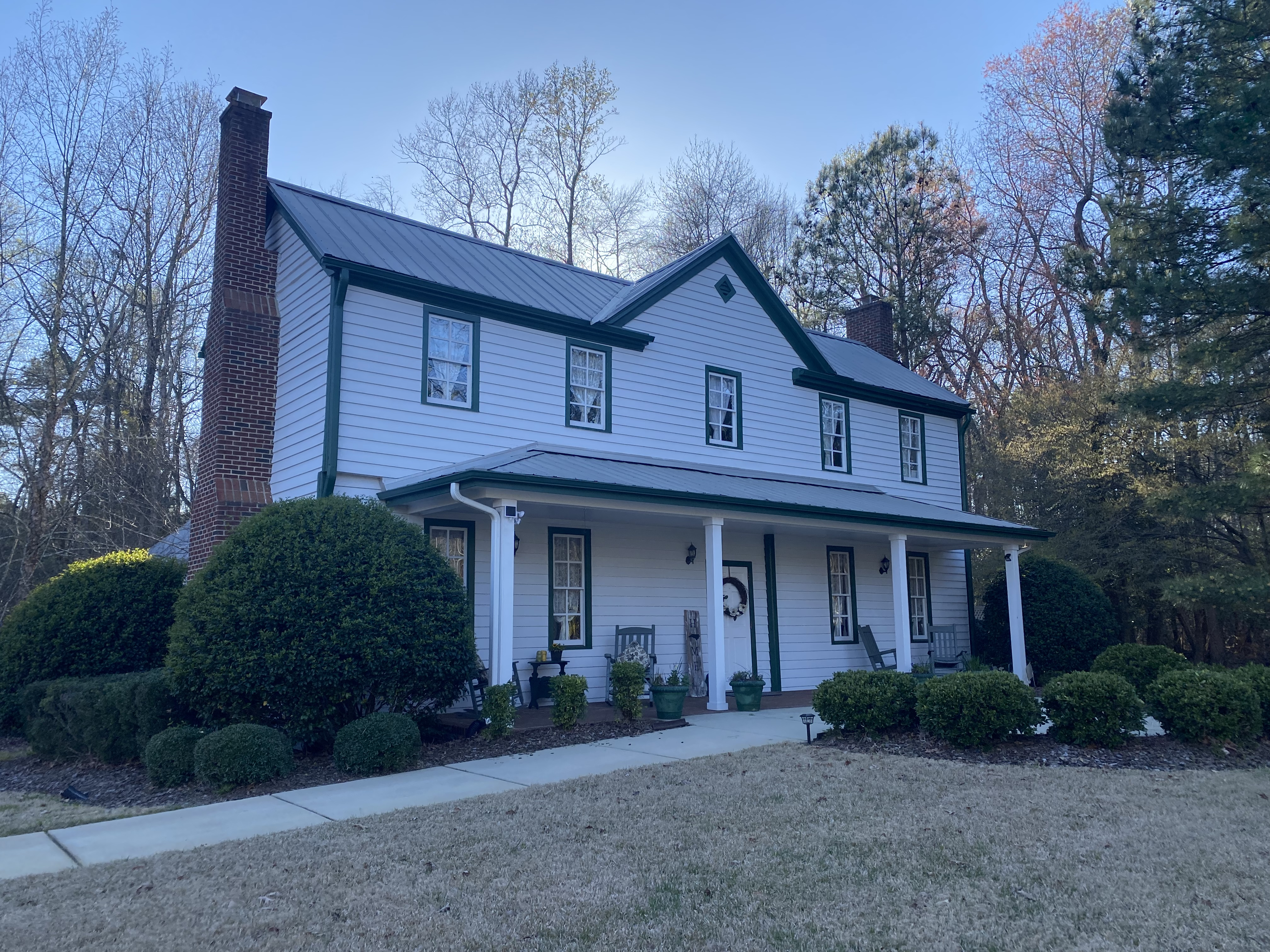
- Pullen House in 2023

General information
- Status: event venue
- Type: plantation house
- Architectural style: Victorian
- Location: 10801 Durant Road; Raleigh, North Carolina, U.S.
- Coordinates: 35°54′25″N 78°35′47″W
- Owner: Pullen family (formerly)

Website
- pullenhouse.com

Pullen House is a historic Victorian plantation house located in northern Raleigh, North Carolina. The house was the center of a small plantation in Wake County that was owned by the Pullen family. Richard Stanhope Pullen, a local businessman and philanthropist who funded the construction of Pullen Park, was born here.

== History ==
Built in the 1800s, it was a modest plantation owned by the Pullen family. The house, now located within the Raleigh city limits, was part of the Neuse Community, named after the nearby Neuse River. Richard Stanhope Pullen, a noted businessman and philanthropist, was born at the house in 1822. Pullen was responsible for funding the development of Pullen Park and was a major benefactor of North Carolina State College, the Peace Institute, the North Carolina Woman's College, and Edenton Street United Methodist Church. The house includes a 600-square foot formal living room.

In 1999, Pullen House was moved a quarter mile east of its original location at the intersection of Falls of Neuse Road and Durant Road to make room for the WakeMed North Hospital. WakeMed purchased the 17-acre lot that the house was built on for $5 million. The house, owned by the Alma Wynne Edgerton Memorial Foundation, was not part of the purchase, and was therefore moved to a new location.

Pullen House is now used as an event and wedding venue.
