= Down Will Come Baby (novel) =

1991 novel by Gloria Murphy

- Author: Gloria Murphy
- Genre: Thriller
- Publisher: Donald I. Fine
- Publication date: 1991
- Publication place: United States
- ISBN: 1-55611-196-7

Down Will Come Baby is a thriller novel written by Gloria Murphy and published in February 1991 by Donald I. Fine. An audio version of the book was also released by Brilliance Corp in a six-cassette tape format later that year.

Down Will Come Baby is the fourth novel by Murphy. It was adapted into a television film of the same name that premiered on CBS on May 4, 1999.

== Synopsis ==
In the novel, 12-year-old Robin Garr is overcome with guilt following the accidental death of her friend at summer camp. Her father Marcus relocates her to Boston, away from Robin's alcoholic mother, where he hopes she will be able to get proper psychiatric help. Their downstairs neighbor Dorothy Cotton quickly takes an interest in Robin, and Marcus is grateful when Dorothy agrees to look after his daughter while he is out of town. When he returns, he is shocked to discover that Dorothy has kidnapped Robin. Robin's parents discover that Dorothy's motives are not as pure as they initially seemed.

== Critical reception ==
Publishers Weekly's Sybil Steinberg said in his review, "Although braced by vivid and original characters, this thriller fails to overcome its heavy predictability." Judith A. Gifford gave the novel her recommendation in Library Journal, writing that the intricate plot "will keep readers turning pages in breathtaking, fascinated horror." In his review of the audio version for Library Journal, Michael J. DuCharme praised narrator Julie Finneran as having "the perfect haunting voice" for this novel.
