= Down Will Come Baby =

1999 American thriller television film

- Promotional poster
- Genre: Thriller
- Based on: Down Will Come Baby by Gloria Murphy
- Teleplay by: Gregory Goodell
- Directed by: Gregory Goodell
- Starring: Meredith Baxter; Diana Scarwid; Tom Amandes; Evan Rachel Wood
- Music by: Joseph Conlan
- Country of origin: United States
- Original language: English

Production
- Executive producers: Renée Valente; Paulette Breen
- Cinematography: Tom Del Ruth
- Editor: Paul Dixon
- Running time: 88 minutes
- Production company: Hearst Entertainment

Original release
- Network: CBS
- Release: May 4, 1999

Down Will Come Baby is a 1999 American suspense thriller television film written and directed by Gregory Goodell, based on the 1991 novel of the same name by Gloria Murphy. The film tells the story of Leah (played by Meredith Baxter), a career woman who prioritizes work over her husband Marcus (Tom Amandes) and their young daughter Robin (Evan Rachel Wood). Leah accepts an out-of-state promotion that takes her away from her family, just as Robin is going through a difficult time following the accidental death of her friend at summer camp. The family's kindly new neighbor Dorothy (Diana Scarwid) steps in to help, but Leah suspects that Dorothy's seemingly innocent interest in her daughter belies a darker motive.

Down Will Come Baby was produced by Hearst Entertainment for CBS, following the network's adaptation of another one of Murphy's novels for the 1996 film Summer of Fear. The film was shot over 18 days in and around Phoenix, Arizona, from February to March 1999. Down Will Come Baby premiered on CBS on May 4, 1999, to negative reviews. Critics panned the film for its lurid depiction of child violence as well as its unflattering view on working mothers. It was watched by 11.4 million total viewers and was the 27th highest-rated prime time broadcast for its respective week.

== Plot ==
Leah Garr is a workaholic whose career often takes her away from her home in Phoenix, Arizona, causing tension with her husband Marcus, who wants her to spend more time with her family. Tired of their constant fighting, the couple's 12-year-old daughter Robin insists on going away to summer camp. At camp, Robin befriends Amelia, an odd girl who lives with her abusive and controlling mother. One night, Robin decides to sneak off for a swim in a nearby lake and convinces Amelia to join her. Amelia is not a good swimmer and ends up drowning, leaving Robin ridden with guilt. Meanwhile, Leah accepts a big promotion that requires her to move to Denver, such that she only gets to see her family on the weekends.

While hanging out at the park, Robin is approached by a friendly stranger named Dorothy Cotton, who later turns out to be Robin's new neighbor. In Leah's absence, Dorothy ingratiates herself in Robin's life, offering to help look after the girl whenever Marcus is busy. Leah is suspicious of Dorothy's intentions, but Marcus reassures her that Dorothy is just trying to be a good friend. Dorothy encourages Robin to confide in her, and Robin admits that she blames herself for her friend Amelia's death. Dorothy shares that her younger sister was also named Amelia, who she claims accidentally fell to her death when they were playing in their attic as children. Robin becomes creeped out by Dorothy's increasingly obsessive behavior, which includes stalking her, rearranging her bedroom, and yelling at the girl when she does not follow her instructions to the letter. Robin shares her fears with Marcus, who thinks she is overreacting. Unbeknownst to the Garrs, Dorothy has also been listening in on their conversations through a baby monitor she hid in Robin's room.

Marcus is grateful when Dorothy agrees to stay over with Robin while he and Leah are out of town. While staying over, Dorothy's overbearing conduct gets on Robin's nerves. When the latter tries to call her mother to complain, Dorothy knocks her unconscious in a fit of rage. Leah and Marcus return home to find their daughter missing and they call the police after noticing blood on the doorframe. The worried couple convince their landlord to unlock Dorothy's barely lived-in apartment, where they find photographs of Robin's friend Amelia. The Garrs realize that Dorothy has been lying about her true identity, and that she is in fact the mother of Robin's deceased friend, who in turn was named after Dorothy's deceased sister. Meanwhile, Robin is being held captive in her late friend's bedroom by a delusional Dorothy, who believes that Robin is actually her daughter Amelia. Tired of waiting for the police, Leah and Marcus break into the summer camp's office, where they find out that Dorothy's real name is Gretchen McIntyre. They rush to Gretchen's address and arrive just in time to stop Gretchen from branding Robin with a hot iron as punishment for her disobedience. The police arrive shortly thereafter and Gretchen has a mental breakdown as she is taken into custody. On their way home, Leah announces that she is going to leave her job post in Denver to be with her family in Phoenix, much to Marcus and Robin's delight.

== Cast ==
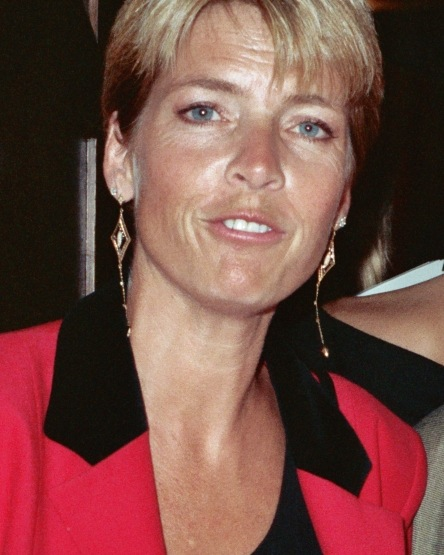
Meredith Baxter (pictured in 1990)

- Meredith Baxter as Leah Garr
- Diana Scarwid as Dorothy Cotton a.k.a. Gretchen McIntyre
- Tom Amandes as Marcus Garr
- Evan Rachel Wood as Robin Garr
- Katie Booze-Mooney as Amelia McIntyre
- Kory Thompson as Calvin
- Nicholas Glaeser as Detective Larkin
- Warner McKay as Linus
- Rahla Kahn as Sophie
- Summer Patterson as Brina

== Production ==
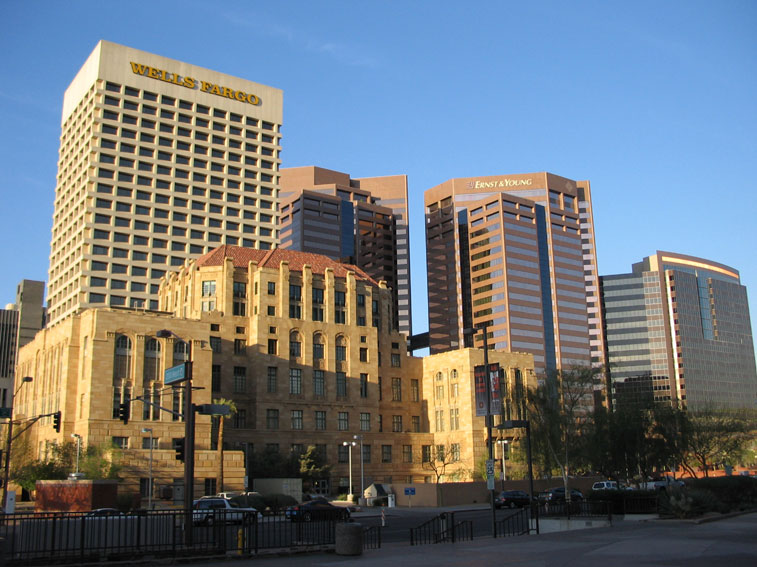
Filming took place in Downtown Phoenix (pictured in 2006)

Down Will Come Baby was written and directed by Gregory Goodell, based on the 1991 novel of the same name by Gloria Murphy. It was produced by Hearst Entertainment for CBS, with Renee Valente and Paullette Breen serving as executive producers. The creative team also included Tom Del Ruth (director of photography), Paul Dixon (editor), and Joseph Conlan (composer). CBS had previously adapted another one of Murphy's novels, Simon Says (1994), into the 1996 television film Summer of Fear. While Murphy was unhappy with the previous adaptation, she approved of Goodell's adaptation of Down Will Come Baby, believing that his script stayed true to her original story and characters. There were some changes made for the film, such as the setting being switched from New England to Arizona.

Meredith Baxter said the role of Leah appealed to her because she could relate to the struggle of being a working mother. She was also drawn to the notion put forth in the script that even ordinary people can find themselves in extraordinary situations, noting that the film starts out following a very normal family before taking a sudden sinister turn. Having done her share of true crime television dramas, Baxter was pleased to be a part of a film that is based on a fictional story. She explained:

This confirms that the networks are again ready and willing to accept stories made up by the magnificence of a writer's mind. For a long period of time, it seemed a script had to come from the headlines before it had any dramatic credibility.

The film was shot on location in Phoenix, Arizona, based out of the downtown area, from February to March 1999. It was shot over 18 days in what Baxter described as a "pretty demanding" schedule. Several local Arizonan actors rounded out the supporting cast including Booze-Mooney, Thompson, Glaeser, and McKay.

== Release and reception ==
Down Will Come Baby premiered on CBS on May 4, 1999, in the 9:00–11:00 pm time slot, as part of the network's season-ending "sweeps" line-up. It was released on home video in the UK later that year by Odyssey Video.

=== Ratings ===
The film earned a national Nielsen rating of 8.7, where each ratings point represents 994,000 households, making it the 27th highest-rated prime time broadcast for the week of May 3 to 9, 1999. Overall it was the 120th most-watched television film for the 1998–1999 season, with a total of 11.4 million viewers.

=== Critical response ===
The Corpus Christi Caller-Times' Elaine Liner found that Down Will Come Baby plays out in such an uninspiring manner, that its only remarkable feature was having Baxter play a "good mom" in contrast to her usual "wack-job" roles. Given its depiction of brutality against a minor, Liner also thought it was irresponsible of CBS to broadcast the film just two weeks after the Columbine High School massacre. Similarly, The Washington Post's Tom Shales and The Times-Picayune's Benjamin Morrison both condemned the film for stoking parental fears with its gratuitous depiction of child violence. Despite his criticisms, Morrison acknowledged that the film was "effective and occasionally well-handled", with an engaging plot and cast; although he felt that its constant gloom ultimately made for an unpleasant viewing experience.

In The Scranton Times-Tribune, Faye Zuckerman opined that any potential for a compelling story was quickly discarded by the filmmakers in favor of typical horror fare. She compared Down Will Come Baby unfavorably to the 1992 film The Hand That Rocks the Cradle, noting the lurid violence displayed in both. Variety's Laura Fries found the cast to be adequate, highlighting Wood as the steadiest performer, but did not think their performances were enough to elevate the film from "a hodgepodge script and so many plot holes". New York magazine's John Leonard highlighted Scarwid's unrestrained performance, but was otherwise unimpressed with what he considered to be a "by-the-numbers" production.

Reviewers also took issue with the apparent moral that sees Leah learning to cast aside her career to focus on being a mother and wife. Morrison suggested that Marcus should have been the one to re-evaluate his behavior instead. Shales, who was especially annoyed by the "simpering" Marcus throughout the film, emphatically stated that the Garr family's problems were really the result of Marcus' foolish ignorance rather than Leah's career ambitions as the script asserted. Fries was critical of Goodell's unflattering treatment of the adult female characters as a whole, noting that they were pigeonholed as either being dedicated to their careers or to their families, with the underlying implication that women who forsake their maternal duties deserve to be punished. Susan Stewart's review in TV Guide Magazine concluded that "the real horror is that movies like this are still made in the era of two-income families".

=== Accolades ===
For her performance as Robin, Wood was nominated for the YoungStar Award for Best Young Actress in a Miniseries/Made for TV Film.
