= Ira David Wood III =

American actor

- Born: November 19, 1947 (age 78); Rocky Mount, North Carolina
- Education: University of North Carolina School of the Arts (BFA)
- Occupations: Actor, director, singer, theater director, playwright
- Spouse(s): Sara Lynn Moore (divorced 2002); Ashley Mattox
- Children: 3, including Evan Rachel Wood

Ira David Wood III (born November 19, 1947) is an American actor, author, singer, theater director and playwright. He is the executive director of Theatre in the Park, a community theatre company in Raleigh, North Carolina. Wood is the father of actress Evan Rachel Wood.

== Early life and family ==
Wood was born in Rocky Mount, North Carolina, and was raised in the town of Enfield, North Carolina. He became Enfield's first Eagle Scout. He is a son of Bettie Lee (Winstead), a nurse, and Ira David Wood, Jr. He is a graduate of The North Carolina School of the Arts, having attended between 1965 and 1970. His first wife is Sara Lynn Moore, an actress, director and acting coach. They were divorced in August 2002. He is married to Ashley Mattox Wood. His sister, Carol Winstead Wood, is a former production designer. Two of his three children, Evan Rachel Wood and Ira David Wood IV, are actors. His youngest son, Thomas Miller Wood, was born in July 2012.

== Career ==
Wood mainly works in live theatre. He has made appearances in a few motion pictures and on television. He had a minor role in Douglas Trumbull's science fiction drama Brainstorm (1983). He has been a guest artist on numerous occasions with the North Carolina Symphony, and he has appeared with Andre Watts and the National Symphony Orchestra at The Kennedy Center.

He is founder and executive director of Theatre in the Park, located in Pullen Park, Raleigh, North Carolina. He has served in that capacity since 1972.

He wrote and directed the opening ceremonies for the U.S. Olympic Festival in 1987 – the largest single athletic event in the history of North Carolina.

He did extensive work in developing a chronology of the John F. Kennedy assassination in preparation for a theatrical production; this work appeared partially in Murder in Dealey Plaza; he is listed as a contributing writer for the book. On September 28, 2011, just prior to the 50th anniversary of the death of Kennedy, Wood's original JFK Assassination Chronology was updated and released as an e-book edited by Bernard Wilds.

Wood authored A Lover's Guide To The Outer Banks and Confessions Of An Elf.

In 2013, Wood became artistic director for the North Carolina outdoor drama The Lost Colony, winning a Tony award for Excellence in Theater. He still serves in that capacity during the summer months.

== A Christmas Carol ==
Wood is best known for conceiving, producing, directing, and headlining (as Scrooge) a musical comedy adaptation of A Christmas Carol that has been performed annually in Raleigh—and, more recently, in nearby Durham—since 1974. His is acknowledged as one of the earliest adaptations of the venerable Christmas classic for the theatre and one of the first adaptations of any type that featured a comic element.

Raleigh newspaper the News & Observer has called it "one of the most successful shows in North Carolina theater history". The production has enjoyed three international tours and has been seen by a total audience of more than two million people.

Wood will retire from the role of Scrooge following the show's 50th anniversary run in 2023, but will continue to serve as the show's director. His son Ira David Wood IV will assume the role full time. The two have been splitting performances in the role for the past few years.

== Awards and recognition ==
Wood has been awarded two Medal of Arts awards for artistic achievement on two occasions (the only individual twice honored), as presented by the Raleigh Arts Commission. He is a recipient of The Order of the Long Leaf Pine by the State of North Carolina. The Babcock Foundation of South Carolina presented him with their Builder of Bridges award.

The City of Compiegne, France and the City of Columbia, South Carolina have awarded him "honorary citizenship."

In 2004, the performance venue of Theatre in the Park in Raleigh was named "The Ira David Wood III Pullen Park Theatre", in recognition of his decades of work in local theatre.

In 2014, Wood received The North Carolina Award in Fine Arts.
