= National Register of Historic Places listings in Wake County, North Carolina =

This National Park Service list is complete through NPS recent listings posted October 2, 2026.

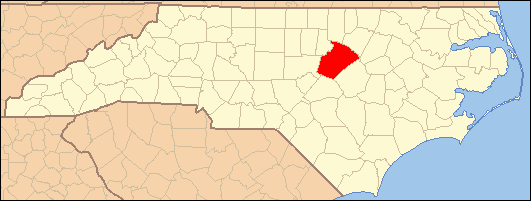

This list includes properties and districts listed on the National Register of Historic Places in Wake County, North Carolina. Click the "Map of all coordinates" link to the right to view an online map of all properties and districts with latitude and longitude coordinates in the table below.

== Current listings ==
	Name on the Register	Image	Date listed	Location	City or town	Description
1	Adams-Edwards House	Adams-Edwards House	December 6, 2006 (#06001109)	5321 Tryon Rd. 35°44′46″N 78°43′46″W	Raleigh	
2	Agriculture Building	Agriculture Building	June 16, 1976 (#76001341)	E. Edenton St. 35°46′53″N 78°38′22″W	Raleigh	
3	Andrews-Duncan House	Andrews-Duncan House	January 20, 1972 (#72000998)	407 N. Blount St. 35°47′05″N 78°38′11″W	Raleigh	
4	Apex City Hall	Apex City Hall	December 5, 1985 (#85003077)	N. Salem St. 35°43′57″N 78°51′03″W	Apex	
5	Apex Historic District	Apex Historic District	March 17, 1994 (#94000185)	Roughly bounded by N. Elm, N. Salem, Center, S. Salem, and W. Chatham Sts.; also roughly bounded by E. Chatham, S. Hughes, S. Mason, and E. Moore Sts.; also Grove and Thompson Sts., and parts of Hunter St.; also roughly centered on Hunter, Center, Chatham, Cunningham, Holleman, and Hughes Sts. 35°43′53″N 78°51′05″W	Apex	Second, third, and fourth set of boundaries represent boundary increases of March 10, 1995, February 14, 2002, and January 31, 2008 respectively
6	Apex Union Depot	Apex Union Depot	December 1, 1988 (#88002697)	Southeastern corner of the junction of N. Salem St. and Center St. 35°43′55″N 78°51′01″W	Apex	
7	G. Dewey and Elma Arndt House	G. Dewey and Elma Arndt House	December 7, 2011 (#11000892)	1428 Canterbury Rd. 35°48′27″N 78°40′10″W	Raleigh	
8	Dr. Thomas H. Avera House		September 11, 2003 (#03000928)	6600 Robertson Pond Rd. 35°49′07″N 78°24′11″W	Wendell	
9	Bailey-Estes House		December 28, 2010 (#10001097)	9020 Mangum Dairy Rd. 36°02′08″N 78°36′09″W	Wake Forest	
10	George and Neva Barbee House	George and Neva Barbee House	August 28, 2007 (#07000881)	216 W. Gannon Ave. 35°49′30″N 78°19′05″W	Zebulon	
11	Battery Heights Historic District	Battery Heights Historic District	January 3, 2011 (#10001111)	Bounded roughly by E. Martin St. on the north, Battery Dr. on the east, E. Davie St. on the south, and Sherrybrook Dr. on the west 35°46′31″N 78°36′54″W	Raleigh	
12	Beaver Dam	Beaver Dam	January 6, 1987 (#86003529)	SR 2049 at SR 2233; 35°48′45″N 78°29′06″W	Knightdale	
13	Ben-Wiley Hotel	Ben-Wiley Hotel	February 27, 1997 (#97000195)	331 S. Main St. 35°34′51″N 78°47′59″W	Fuquay-Varina	
14	Dr. Nathan M. Blalock House	Dr. Nathan M. Blalock House	December 23, 2005 (#05001449)	6741 Rock Service Station Rd. 35°35′42″N 78°38′49″W	Raleigh	
15	Bloomsbury Historic District	Bloomsbury Historic District	May 16, 2002 (#02000497)	Roughly bounded by Fairview Rd., St. Mary's St., Byrd St., Sunset Dr., and Whitaker Mill Rd. 35°48′38″N 78°38′53″W	Raleigh	
16	Boylan Apartments	Boylan Apartments	September 5, 2007 (#07000902)	817 Hillsborough St. 35°46′57″N 78°39′05″W	Raleigh	
17	Boylan Heights	Boylan Heights	July 29, 1985 (#85001671)	Roughly bounded by the Norfolk Southern railroad line, Mountford, Martin and Florence Sts. and Dorothea Dr. 35°46′26″N 78°39′07″W	Raleigh	
18	Briggs Hardware Building	Briggs Hardware Building	October 25, 1973 (#73001372)	220 Fayetteville St. 35°46′39″N 78°38′23″W	Raleigh	
19	Bennett Bunn Plantation	Bennett Bunn Plantation	February 4, 1986 (#86000157)	NC 97; 35°50′14″N 78°16′59″W	Zebulon	
20	Cameron Park	Cameron Park	July 29, 1985 (#85001673)	Roughly bounded by Clark Ave., W. Peace and Saint Mary's Sts., College Pl., Hillsborough St. and Oberlin Rd. 35°47′07″N 78°39′29″W	Raleigh	
21	Cameron Village Historic District	Cameron Village Historic District	December 22, 2011 (#11000956)	Roughly bounded by Daniels St., Wade Ave., Woodburn Rd., and Smallwood Dr. 35°47′38″N 78°39′27″W	Raleigh	
22	Cannady-Brogden Farm		April 25, 2001 (#01000424)	15260 Brogden Rd. 36°03′55″N 78°41′09″W	Creedmoor	
23	Capehart House	Capehart House	January 17, 1975 (#75001293)	424 N. Blount St. 35°47′09″N 78°38′17″W	Raleigh	
24	Capital Club Building	Capital Club Building	December 5, 1985 (#85003076)	16 W. Martin St. 35°46′38″N 78°38′26″W	Raleigh	
25	Capitol Area Historic District	Capitol Area Historic District	April 15, 1978 (#78001978)	State Capitol building and environs 35°46′48″N 78°38′15″W	Raleigh	
26	Capitol Heights Historic District	Capitol Heights Historic District	January 3, 2011 (#10001112)	Roughly bounded by Penn Rd., North State St., Glascock St., and Madison Rd. 35°47′26″N 78°37′18″W	Raleigh	
27	Caraleigh Mills	Caraleigh Mills	May 25, 2001 (#01000557)	421 Maywood Ave. 35°45′41″N 78°39′12″W	Raleigh	
28	Carolina Coach Garage and Shop	Carolina Coach Garage and Shop	August 27, 2009 (#09000661)	510 E. Davie St. 35°46′31″N 78°37′54″W	Raleigh	
29	Carolina Power and Light Company Car Barn and Automobile Garage	Carolina Power and Light Company Car Barn and Automobile Garage	October 30, 1997 (#97001304)	116 N. West St. 35°46′57″N 78°38′44″W	Raleigh	
30	Carpenter Historic District	Carpenter Historic District	May 26, 2000 (#00000549)	Morrisville-Carpenter Road, east of CSX Transportation tracks and west of Davis Drive; 35°49′18″N 78°51′47″W	Cary	
31	Cary Historic District	Cary Historic District	April 25, 2001 (#01000425)	Roughly along Dry Ave., S. Academy St., and Park St. 35°47′09″N 78°46′56″W	Cary	
32	John Chavis Memorial Park	John Chavis Memorial Park	April 19, 2016 (#16000188)	505 Martin Luther King Blvd. 35°46′10″N 78°37′48″W	Raleigh	
33	Christ Episcopal Church	Christ Episcopal Church	July 28, 1970 (#70000469)	120 E. Edenton St. 35°46′52″N 78°39′36″W	Raleigh	Designated a National Historic Landmark on December 23, 1987
34	City Cemetery	City Cemetery	September 12, 2008 (#08000889)	17 S. E. St. 35°46′45″N 78°37′51″W	Raleigh	
35	Crabtree Creek Recreational Demonstration Area	Crabtree Creek Recreational Demonstration Area	June 30, 1995 (#95000783)	Roughly bounded by Interstate 40, U.S. Route 70, and the Raleigh-Durham Airport; 35°51′17″N 78°45′09″W	Raleigh	
36	William A. Curtis House	William A. Curtis House	September 24, 2008 (#08000939)	1415 Poole Rd. 35°46′44″N 78°37′01″W	Raleigh	
37	Josephus Daniels House	Josephus Daniels House	December 8, 1976 (#76001342)	1520 Caswell St. 35°47′57″N 78°38′50″W	Raleigh	National Historic Landmark status was withdrawn in 2024.
38	Davis-Adcock Store	Davis-Adcock Store	September 6, 2006 (#06000788)	2013 Piney Grove-Wilbon Rd., on the eastern side of Piney Grove-Wilbon Rd., and 0.2 miles (0.32 km) north of its junction with Wilbon Rd. 35°36′11″N 78°50′21″W	Holly Springs	
39	Depot Historic District	Depot Historic District	September 6, 2002 (#02000946)	Bounded by W. Hargett, S. McDowell, S. Dawson, and W. Cabarrus St.; also 302-310 S. West St. 35°46′42″N 78°38′38″W	Raleigh	Second set of addresses represent a boundary increase of September 18, 2017
40	Dix Hill	Dix Hill	November 7, 1990 (#90001638)	Roughly bounded by Dorothea Dr., Lake Wheeler Rd., and the Norfolk Southern railroad tracks 35°46′06″N 78°39′15″W	Raleigh	
41	Dodd-Hinsdale House	Dodd-Hinsdale House	November 12, 1971 (#71000623)	330 Hillsborough St. 35°46′51″N 78°38′41″W	Raleigh	
42	Downtown Garner Historic District		December 21, 1989 (#89002157)	Roughly Garner Rd. and Main St. from New Rand Rd. to Broughton St. 35°42′27″N 78°36′25″W	Garner	
43	Downtown Wake Forest Historic District		February 20, 2002 (#02000059)	South White St. roughly from E. Roosevelt Ave. to Owen Ave. 35°58′48″N 78°30′36″W	Wake Forest	
44	W. E. B. DuBois School		October 5, 1993 (#93000998)	536 Franklin St. 35°59′06″N 78°30′04″W	Wake Forest	
45	East Raleigh-South Park Historic District	East Raleigh-South Park Historic District	October 11, 1990 (#90001527)	Roughly bounded by Bragg, East, E. Lenoir, Alston, Camden, Hargett, Swain, Davis, and S. Blount Sts. 35°46′20″N 78°38′00″W	Raleigh	
46	Edenwood		July 2, 1993 (#93000544)	7620 Old Stage Rd. 35°40′26″N 78°39′38″W	Garner	
47	Elmwood	Elmwood	October 29, 1975 (#75001294)	16 N. Boylan Ave. 35°46′53″N 78°38′56″W	Raleigh	
48	Estey Hall	Estey Hall	May 25, 1973 (#73001373)	E. South St. on Shaw University campus 35°46′17″N 78°38′14″W	Raleigh	
49	Fadum House	Fadum House	June 10, 1993 (#93000440)	3056 Granville Dr. 35°49′19″N 78°39′51″W	Raleigh	
50	Falls of the Neuse Manufacturing Company	Falls of the Neuse Manufacturing Company	September 19, 1983 (#83001921)	Neuse River at SR 2000; 35°56′20″N 78°34′44″W	Falls	
51	Fayetteville Street Historic District	Fayetteville Street Historic District	February 27, 2008 (#07001412)	Roughly the 100-400 blocks of Fayetteville, the 000-100 blocks of W. Hargett, the 000 block of W. Martin, and the 100-400 blocks of S. Salisbury Sts. 35°46′39″N 78°38′21″W	Raleigh	
52	Federal Building	Federal Building	May 6, 1971 (#71000624)	300 Fayetteville St. 35°46′38″N 78°38′40″W	Raleigh	
53	Forestville Baptist Church	Forestville Baptist Church	October 25, 1984 (#84000118)	1350 S. Main St. 35°57′36″N 78°31′13″W	Forestville	
54	Free Church of the Good Shepherd	Free Church of the Good Shepherd	September 10, 2008 (#08000888)	110 S. East St. 35°46′44″N 78°37′57″W	Raleigh	
55	Fuquay Mineral Spring	Fuquay Mineral Spring	December 4, 1986 (#86003457)	Northeastern corner of Main and W. Spring Sts. 35°34′48″N 78°48′03″W	Fuquay-Varina	
56	Fuquay Springs High School		May 16, 2002 (#02000495)	112 N. Ennis St. 35°35′12″N 78°47′38″W	Fuquay-Varina	
57	Fuquay Springs Historic District	Fuquay Springs Historic District	November 29, 1996 (#96001398)	Roughly, S. Main St. and Fuquay Ave. from Spring St. to Sunset Dr. and Spring St. from Spring Ave. to Angier Rd. 35°34′49″N 78°47′55″W	Fuquay-Varina	
58	Fuquay Springs Teacherage	Fuquay Springs Teacherage	December 23, 2005 (#05001448)	602 E Academy St. 35°35′09″N 78°47′35″W	Fuquay-Varina	
59	Fuquay-Varina Woman's Club Clubhouse	Fuquay-Varina Woman's Club Clubhouse	April 24, 2007 (#07000352)	602 N. Ennis St. 35°35′32″N 78°47′35″W	Fuquay-Varina	
60	Glen Royall Mill Village Historic District		August 27, 1999 (#99001046)	Roughly bounded by N. Main St., E. Cedar Ave., CSX RR, and Royall Cotton Mill; 35°59′20″N 78°30′10″W	Wake Forest	
61	Glenwood	Glenwood	July 29, 1985 (#85001672)	Roughly bounded by W. Peace St., St. Mary's St., Wills Forest St., and Glenwood Ave. 35°47′36″N 78°38′45″W	Raleigh	Present boundaries reflect a boundary increase and decrease of February 20, 2002; original boundaries were "roughly bounded by Wade Ave., the Norfolk and Southern railroad line, Belmont St., and Glenwood Ave."
62	Graves-Fields House	Graves-Fields House	August 16, 2021 (#100006810)	814 Oberlin Rd. 35°47′42″N 78°39′40″W	Raleigh	Originally listed in 2002 as the Willis M. Graves House (#02000500). It was delisted when it was relocated to its current location in 2019, and was relisted in 2021.
63	Green Level Historic District		April 5, 2001 (#01000340)	Jct. Green Level Church, Green Level West Rd., and Beaver Dam Rd. 35°47′06″N 78°54′11″W	Cary	
64	Herman Green House	Herman Green House	September 11, 2003 (#03000930)	NC 1371, 0.4 miles (0.64 km) north of NC 1375 (5500 Lake Wheeler Rd.); 35°42′34″N 78°41′22″W	Raleigh	
65	Green-Hartsfield House		December 21, 1989 (#89002158)	SR 2303 at jct. with SR 2304; 35°55′02″N 78°22′57″W	Rolesville	
66	Grosvenor Gardens Apartments	Grosvenor Gardens Apartments	November 12, 1992 (#92001602)	1101 Hillsborough St. 35°46′53″N 78°39′18″W	Raleigh	
67	Rev. Plummer T. Hall House	Rev. Plummer T. Hall House	May 16, 2002 (#02000501)	814 Oberlin Rd. 35°47′43″N 78°39′39″W	Raleigh	
68	Harmony Plantation		January 29, 2008 (#07001504)	5104 Riley Hill Rd. 35°51′54″N 78°26′38″W	Wendell	
69	Harwell Hamilton and Jean Bangs Harris House and Office	Harwell Hamilton and Jean Bangs Harris House and Office	December 28, 2010 (#10001098)	122 Cox Ave. 35°47′02″N 78°39′40″W	Raleigh	
70	Hawkins-Hartness House	Hawkins-Hartness House	February 1, 1972 (#72000999)	310 N. Blount St. 35°48′19″N 78°36′57″W	Raleigh	
71	Hayes Barton Historic District	Hayes Barton Historic District	May 16, 2002 (#02000496)	Roughly bounded by St. Mary's St., Fairview Rd., Aycock St., Scales St. and Williamson Dr. 35°48′14″N 78°38′57″W	Raleigh	
72	Haywood Hall	Haywood Hall	July 28, 1970 (#70000470)	211 New Bern Ave. 35°46′50″N 78°38′09″W	Raleigh	
73	Hi-Mount Historic District	Hi-Mount Historic District	July 29, 2011 (#11000484)	Roughly bounded by E. Whitaker Mill Rd. and Bernard, Peebles, Main, and Hilton Sts. 35°48′41″N 78°37′53″W	Raleigh	
74	Dr. Hubert Benbury Haywood House	Dr. Hubert Benbury Haywood House	December 13, 1995 (#95001440)	634 N. Blount St. 35°47′19″N 78°38′10″W	Raleigh	
75	Richard B. Haywood House	Richard B. Haywood House	July 28, 1970 (#70000471)	127 E. Edenton St. 35°47′08″N 78°38′17″W	Raleigh	
76	Heartsfield-Perry Farm		January 23, 2003 (#02001728)	NC 2224, 0.1 miles (0.16 km) southeast of NC 2300; 35°54′55″N 78°23′33″W	Rolesville	
77	Heck-Andrews House	Heck-Andrews House	January 20, 1972 (#72001000)	309 N. Blount St. 35°48′19″N 78°36′58″W	Raleigh	
78	Heck-Lee, Heck-Wynne, and Heck-Pool Houses	Heck-Lee, Heck-Wynne, and Heck-Pool Houses	April 13, 1973 (#73001374)	503 and 511 E. Jones St. and 218 N. East St. 35°46′58″N 78°37′58″W	Raleigh	
79	Isabelle Bowen Henderson House and Gardens	Isabelle Bowen Henderson House and Gardens	August 7, 1989 (#89001049)	2134 Oberlin Rd. 35°47′15″N 78°39′44″W	Raleigh	
80	Samuel Bartley Holleman House	Samuel Bartley Holleman House	January 30, 2008 (#07001503)	3424 Avent Ferry Rd. 35°37′07″N 78°54′36″W	New Hill	
81	Holly Springs Masonic Lodge	Holly Springs Masonic Lodge	April 7, 2010 (#10000164)	224 Raleigh St. 35°39′07″N 78°49′57″W	Holly Springs	
82	Hood-Anderson Farm	Hood-Anderson Farm	April 29, 1999 (#99000509)	Old Battle Bridge Rd., 0.4 miles (0.64 km) south of the junction with Old Tarboro Rd. 35°47′46″N 78°24′20″W	Eagle Rock	
83	Rufus J. Ivey House	Rufus J. Ivey House	April 5, 2006 (#06000223)	6115 Louisburg; 35°51′35″N 78°33′12″W	Raleigh	
84	Ivey-Ellington House	Ivey-Ellington House	May 15, 2008 (#08000414)	135 W. Chatham St. 35°47′14″N 78°46′56″W	Cary	
85	J. S. Dorton Arena	J. S. Dorton Arena	April 11, 1973 (#73001375)	North Carolina State Fairgrounds, W. Hillsborough St. 35°47′37″N 78°42′36″W	Raleigh	
86	J. Beale Johnson House	J. Beale Johnson House	September 5, 1991 (#91001375)	6321 Johnson Pond Rd. 35°36′40″N 78°45′21″W	Fuquay-Varina	
87	Kemp B. Johnson House	Kemp B. Johnson House	September 15, 2005 (#05001028)	7116 Johnson Pond Rd. 35°35′58″N 78°45′49″W	Fuquay-Varina	
88	Alpheus Jones House	Alpheus Jones House	July 7, 1975 (#75001295)	6512 Louisburg Rd. 35°51′50″N 78°32′50″W	Raleigh	
89	Dr. Calvin Jones House	Dr. Calvin Jones House	December 20, 2016 (#16000880)	414 N. Main St. 35°59′03″N 78°30′27″W	Wake Forest	Wake Forest Historical Museum
90	Nancy Jones House	Nancy Jones House	March 1, 1984 (#84002540)	NC 54; 35°47′54″N 78°48′09″W	Cary	
91	Nathaniel Jones Jr. House	Nathaniel Jones Jr. House	June 4, 1973 (#73001376)	3108 Hillmer Drive; 35°49′20″N 78°37′26″W	Raleigh	Listing renamed from "Crabtree Jones House" in 2016.
92	Jones-Johnson-Ballentine Historic District		January 26, 1990 (#89002352)	SR 1301-522 Sunset Rd. 35°36′36″N 78°46′21″W	Fuquay-Varina	
93	Henry L. Kamphoefner House	Henry L. Kamphoefner House	March 12, 1996 (#96000197)	3060 Granville Dr. 35°49′21″N 78°39′46″W	Raleigh	
94	Henry H. and Bettie S. Knight Farm		January 12, 1988 (#87002234)	US 64; 35°48′04″N 78°29′34″W	Knightdale	
95	Joel Lane House	Joel Lane House	July 28, 1970 (#70000472)	728 W. Hargett St. 35°46′40″N 78°39′03″W	Raleigh	
96	Lane-Bennett House		June 30, 1983 (#77001011)	7408 Ebenezer Church Rd. 35°52′17″N 78°44′27″W	Raleigh	
97	Rev. M.L. Latta House	Rev. M.L. Latta House	May 16, 2002 (#02000502)	1001 Parker St. 35°47′53″N 78°39′47″W	Raleigh	Burned on January 8, 2007.
98	Calvin Wray Lawrence House		September 23, 2008 (#08000937)	8528 Ragan Rd. 35°43′00″N 78°56′23″W	Apex	
99	Dr. Elmo N. Lawrence House		April 20, 2005 (#05000320)	2121 Lake Wheeler Rd. 35°45′09″N 78°40′05″W	Raleigh	
100	Lea Laboratory		May 29, 1975 (#75001298)	Southeastern Baptist Theological Seminary campus 35°58′52″N 78°30′42″W	Wake Forest	
101	Leslie-Alford-Mims House	Leslie-Alford-Mims House	March 8, 1997 (#97000218)	100 Avent Ferry Rd. 35°39′07″N 78°50′11″W	Holly Springs	
102	Lewis-Smith House	Lewis-Smith House	December 11, 1972 (#72001001)	515 N. Blount St. 35°47′08″N 78°38′08″W	Raleigh	
103	Longview Gardens Historic District	Longview Gardens Historic District	January 3, 2011 (#10001113)	Bounded roughly by King Charles Rd., Poole Rd., Donald Ross Dr., Albemarle Ave., Longview Lake Dr., and New Bern Ave. 35°46′37″N 78°35′50″W	Raleigh	
104	Lumsden-Boone Building	Lumsden-Boone Building	September 8, 1983 (#83001923)	226 Fayetteville St. Mall; 35°46′38″N 78°38′23″W	Raleigh	
105	Madonna Acres Historic District	Madonna Acres Historic District	September 1, 2010 (#10000632)	Delany Dr., Dillon, Summerville, and Tierney Circles; 35°47′27″N 78°36′55″W	Raleigh	
106	Mahler and Carolina Trust Buildings	Mahler and Carolina Trust Buildings	November 29, 2000 (#00000457)	228-232 Fayetteville St. Mall; 35°46′38″N 78°38′23″W	Raleigh	
107	Maiden Lane Historic District	Maiden Lane Historic District	May 3, 2006 (#06000338)	2-20 Maiden Ln. 35°47′19″N 78°39′47″W	Raleigh	
108	James Mangum House	James Mangum House	November 18, 1974 (#74001379)	Southwest of Durham off NC 751; 36°01′22″N 78°41′58″W	Creedmoor	Creedmoor is in Granville County. The geocode coordinates in the NRIS are in Chatham County. NC-751 southwest of Durham places the site in either Durham or Chatham County.
109	Marshall-Harris-Richardson House	Marshall-Harris-Richardson House	March 5, 1986 (#86000403)	116 N. Person St. 35°46′53″N 78°38′05″W	Raleigh	
110	Mary Elizabeth Hospital	Mary Elizabeth Hospital	February 5, 2009 (#08001415)	1100 Wake Forest Rd. 35°47′37″N 78°37′53″W	Raleigh	
111	Masonic Temple Building	Masonic Temple Building	May 3, 1984 (#84002533)	427 S. Blount St. 35°46′27″N 78°38′12″W	Raleigh	
112	Masonic Temple Building	Masonic Temple Building	September 17, 1979 (#79003341)	133 Fayetteville St. Mall; 35°46′42″N 78°38′21″W	Raleigh	
113	Matsumoto House	Matsumoto House	September 21, 1994 (#94001089)	821 Runnymeade Rd. 35°48′55″N 78°40′31″W	Raleigh	
114	Meadowbrook Country Club		December 16, 2009 (#09001106)	8025 Country Club Dr. 35°39′37″N 78°34′10″W	Garner	
115	Merrimon-Wynne House	Merrimon-Wynne House	August 25, 2014 (#14000523)	500 N. Blount St. 35°47′11″N 78°38′09″W	Raleigh	Originally listed in 1975 as the Merrimon House (#75001296). It was delisted when it was relocated to its current location.
116	Midway Plantation House and Outbuildings	Midway Plantation House and Outbuildings	June 15, 2007 (#07000543)	1625 Old Crews Rd. 35°49′24″N 78°29′13″W	Knightdale	Buildings relocated in 2006. Original listing (70000473) cancelled and replaced by this listing.
117	Montfort Hall	Montfort Hall	March 8, 1978 (#78001979)	308 Boylan Ave. 35°46′35″N 78°39′04″W	Raleigh	
118	Moore Square Historic District	Moore Square Historic District	August 3, 1983 (#83001924)	Roughly bounded by Person, Morgan, Wilmington, and Davie Sts. 35°46′39″N 78°38′14″W	Raleigh	
119	Mordecai House	Mordecai House	July 1, 1970 (#70000474)	Mimosa St. 35°47′33″N 78°38′00″W	Raleigh	
120	Mordecai Place Historic District	Mordecai Place Historic District	February 4, 1998 (#97001668)	Roughly bounded by N. Blount St., Courtland Dr., Old Wake Forest Rd., and Mordecai Dr.; also 208 Delway St. 35°47′30″N 78°37′58″W	Raleigh	208 Delway represents a boundary increase of December 28, 2000
121	Morrisville Christian Church	Morrisville Christian Church	November 6, 2012 (#12000913)	222 Church St. 35°49′30″N 78°49′42″W	Morrisville	
122	Mount Hope Cemetery	Mount Hope Cemetery	January 8, 2009 (#08001292)	1100 Fayetteville St. 35°45′57″N 78°38′35″W	Raleigh	
123	William and Barbara Mutschler House		April 20, 2023 (#100008854)	1320 Country Club Dr. 35°59′49″N 78°31′44″W	Wake Forest	
124	New Hill Historic District	New Hill Historic District	April 25, 2001 (#01000426)	Roughly 0.5 miles (0.80 km) south of the junction of Old U.S. Route 1 and NC 1127, and 2 miles (3.2 km) west of the junction with Old U.S. Route 1; 35°40′48″N 78°56′26″W	New Hill	
125	Norburn Terrace		February 1, 1980 (#80002902)	216 Lafayette St. 35°47′38″N 78°37′47″W	Raleigh	
126	North Carolina Agricultural Experiment Station Cottage	North Carolina Agricultural Experiment Station Cottage	October 15, 2001 (#01001112)	2714 Vanderbilt Ave. 35°47′30″N 78°40′20″W	Raleigh	
127	North Carolina Executive Mansion	North Carolina Executive Mansion	February 26, 1970 (#70000475)	210 N. Blount St. 35°46′59″N 78°38′09″W	Raleigh	
128	North Carolina School for the Blind and Deaf Dormitory	North Carolina School for the Blind and Deaf Dormitory	August 11, 1976 (#76001343)	216 W. Jones St. 35°46′58″N 78°38′35″W	Raleigh	
129	North Carolina State Capitol	North Carolina State Capitol	February 26, 1970 (#70000476)	Capitol Sq. 35°46′59″N 78°38′20″W	Raleigh	
130	North Carolina State Fair Commercial & Education Buildings	North Carolina State Fair Commercial & Education Buildings	June 5, 1987 (#87000855)	Northwestern corner of the junction of Blue Ridge Rd. and Hillsborough St. 35°47′40″N 78°42′28″W	Raleigh	
131	Berry O'Kelly Historic District	Berry O'Kelly Historic District	May 1, 2017 (#100000941)	512, 514, and 520 Method Rd. 35°47′34″N 78°41′40″W	Raleigh	
132	Oak Grove Cemetery		September 11, 2018 (#100002930)	4303 Beryl Rd. 35°47′20″N 78°41′55″W	Raleigh	
133	Oak View	Oak View	April 3, 1991 (#91000359)	Jct. of Poole Rd. and Raleigh Beltline; 35°46′10″N 78°34′20″W	Raleigh	
134	Oakforest		June 11, 1998 (#98000689)	9958 Seawell Dr. 35°56′32″N 78°31′26″W	Wake Forest	
135	Oakwood Historic District	Oakwood Historic District	June 25, 1974 (#74001380)	Roughly bounded by N. Boundary, Person, Jones, and Linden Sts., and Oakwood Cemetery; also the eastern side of Linden Ave. and the northern side of the 700 block of E. Lane St.; also portions of N. and S. Bloodworth St., N. and S. East St., N. Person St., E. Morgan St., New Bern Ave., and E. Edenton St.; also roughly bounded by E. Franklin St., Wautauga St., Boundary St., and N. Bloodworth St. 35°47′06″N 78°37′42″W	Raleigh	Second, third, and fourth sets of boundaries represent boundary increases of October 21, 1987, January 6, 1988, and January 9, 1989 respectively
136	Oaky Grove	Oaky Grove	September 30, 1993 (#93001021)	Southeastern corner of the junction of NC 2506 and NC 2507; 35°44′23″N 78°26′18″W	Shotwell	
137	Oberlin Cemetery	Oberlin Cemetery	September 11, 2018 (#100002931)	1014 Oberlin Rd. 35°47′50″N 78°39′30″W	Raleigh	
138	Occidental Life Insurance Company Building	Occidental Life Insurance Company Building	September 11, 2003 (#03000929)	1001 Wade Ave. 35°47′50″N 78°39′25″W	Raleigh	
139	Odd Fellows Building	Odd Fellows Building	December 1, 1997 (#97001498)	19 W Hargett St. 35°46′40″N 78°38′24″W	Raleigh	
140	Williamson Page House	Williamson Page House	April 16, 2012 (#12000218)	116 S. Page St. 35°49′17″N 78°49′30″W	Morrisville	
141	Page-Walker Hotel	Page-Walker Hotel	May 29, 1979 (#79003339)	119 Ambassador St. 35°47′19″N 78°46′46″W	Cary	
142	Panther Branch School		May 8, 2001 (#01000421)	9109 Sauls Rd. 35°37′59″N 78°38′28″W	Raleigh	
143	Paschal House	Paschal House	September 21, 1994 (#94001088)	3334 Alamance Dr. 35°49′41″N 78°39′48″W	Raleigh	Demolished in 2013.
144	Peace College Main Building	Peace College Main Building	June 19, 1973 (#73001377)	Peace St. and N end of Wilmington St. 35°47′21″N 78°38′18″W	Raleigh	
145	Jesse Penny House and Outbuildings	Jesse Penny House and Outbuildings	March 13, 2002 (#02000165)	5611 Penny Rd. 35°42′40″N 78°42′06″W	Raleigh	
146	Perry Farm		August 26, 1994 (#94001025)	NC 2320 south side, east of the junction with NC 2300; 35°51′07″N 78°24′09″W	Riley Hill	
147	Pilot Mill	Pilot Mill	June 5, 1989 (#89000441)	1121 Haynes St. 35°47′43″N 78°38′17″W	Raleigh	
148	Pine Hall	Pine Hall	September 6, 2006 (#06000789)	5300 Castlebrook Dr. 35°49′18″N 78°32′59″W	Raleigh	
149	Pine State Creamery, (Former)	Pine State Creamery, (Former)	December 1, 1997 (#97001499)	414 Glenwood Ave. 35°47′08″N 78°38′49″W	Raleigh	
150	Leonidas L. Polk House	Leonidas L. Polk House	April 13, 1977 (#77001012)	612 N. Blount St. 35°47′18″N 78°38′09″W	Raleigh	
151	Wayland E. Poole House		September 25, 2003 (#03000967)	NC 2555, 0.2 miles (0.32 km) south of the junction with NC 1004 (4800 Auburn-Knightdale Rd.); 35°41′31″N 78°33′02″W	Auburn	
152	Dr. M.T. Pope House	Dr. M.T. Pope House	November 22, 1999 (#99001392)	511 S Wilmington St. 35°46′24″N 78°38′19″W	Raleigh	
153	Powell House		October 15, 1974 (#74001381)	Southwest of Wake Forest off US Route 1; 35°55′24″N 78°32′33″W	Wake Forest	
154	Professional Building	Professional Building	September 8, 1983 (#83001925)	123-127 W. Hargett and McDowell Sts. 35°46′42″N 78°38′28″W	Raleigh	
155	Pugh House	Pugh House	June 19, 2014 (#14000334)	103 Page St. 35°49′21″N 78°49′34″W	Morrisville	Originally listed in 2003 (#03000932). It was delisted when it was relocated to its current location in 2008, and relisted in 2014.
156	Pullen Park Carousel	Pullen Park Carousel	September 8, 1976 (#76001344)	Pullen Park, Western Blvd. 35°46′46″N 78°39′52″W	Raleigh	
157	Purefoy-Chappell House and Outbuildings	Purefoy-Chappell House and Outbuildings	October 22, 2008 (#08001016)	1255 S. Main St. 35°57′43″N 78°31′05″W	Wake Forest	
158	Purefoy-Dunn Plantation		March 24, 1988 (#88000238)	East side US Route 1, 0.3 miles (0.48 km) north of US 1A; 35°57′32″N 78°32′19″W	Wake Forest	
159	Raleigh Banking and Trust Company Building	Raleigh Banking and Trust Company Building	June 17, 1993 (#93000543)	5 W. Hargett St. 35°46′39″N 78°38′23″W	Raleigh	
160	Raleigh Bonded Warehouse	Raleigh Bonded Warehouse	August 24, 2006 (#06000790)	1505 Capital Boulevard; 35°48′07″N 78°37′43″W	Raleigh	
161	Raleigh Electric Company Power House	Raleigh Electric Company Power House	October 30, 1997 (#97001305)	513-515 W. Jones St. 35°46′56″N 78°38′48″W	Raleigh	
162	Raleigh National Cemetery	Raleigh National Cemetery	January 31, 1997 (#97000022)	501 Rock Quarry Rd. 35°46′25″N 78°37′14″W	Raleigh	
163	Raleigh Water Tower	Raleigh Water Tower	December 16, 1971 (#71000625)	115 W. Morgan St. 35°46′45″N 78°38′42″W	Raleigh	
164	Raleigh Water Works and E.B. Bain Water Treatment Plant	Raleigh Water Works and E.B. Bain Water Treatment Plant	November 22, 1999 (#99001452)	1810 Fayetteville Rd. 35°45′28″N 78°38′33″W	Raleigh	
165	Sir Walter Raleigh Hotel	Sir Walter Raleigh Hotel	August 11, 1978 (#78001980)	400-412 Fayetteville St. 35°46′31″N 78°38′24″W	Raleigh	
166	Riley Hill School		April 25, 2001 (#01000415)	NC 2320, 0.2 miles (0.32 km) east of NC 2318; 35°51′34″N 78°24′59″W	Wendell	
167	Ritcher House	Ritcher House	September 21, 1994 (#94001087)	3039 Churchill Rd. 35°48′20″N 78°40′39″W	Raleigh	
168	Roanoke Park Historic District	Roanoke Park Historic District	May 9, 2003 (#03000389)	Roughly bounded by Whitaker Mill Rd., Fairview Rd., Morrison Ave., Sunrise Ave., and Brickett Boulevard; 35°48′10″N 78°38′30″W	Raleigh	
169	Rochester Heights Historic District	Rochester Heights Historic District	December 7, 2011 (#11000893)	Roughly bounded by Bailey Dr., Boaz Rd., Calloway Dr., and Garner Rd. 35°45′16″N 78°37′40″W	Raleigh	
170	Rock Cliff Farm		August 29, 2007 (#07000879)	western end of Bent Rd. 35°59′59″N 78°38′47″W	Wake Forest	
171	Rogers-Bagley-Daniels-Pegues House	Rogers-Bagley-Daniels-Pegues House	March 21, 1979 (#79001759)	125 E. South St. 35°46′19″N 78°38′15″W	Raleigh	
172	Rogers-Whitaker-Haywood House		September 19, 1985 (#85002418)	NC 2044 and U.S. Route 401; 35°53′50″N 78°30′30″W	Raleigh	
173	Mae and Philip Rothstein House	Mae and Philip Rothstein House	April 15, 2005 (#05000321)	912 Williamson Dr. 35°48′03″N 78°39′06″W	Raleigh	
174	Royal Baking Company	Royal Baking Company	December 30, 1997 (#97001593)	3801 Hillsborough St. 35°47′38″N 78°41′18″W	Raleigh	
175	Royall Cotton Mill Commissary		October 16, 1991 (#91001504)	Jct. of Brick and Brewer Sts. 35°59′21″N 78°30′05″W	Wake Forest	
176	St. Ambrose Episcopal Church	St. Ambrose Episcopal Church	December 19, 2019 (#100004791)	813 Darby St. 35°45′23″N 78°37′30″W	Raleigh	
177	St. Augustine's College Campus	St. Augustine's College Campus	March 28, 1980 (#80002903)	Oakwood Ave. 35°47′08″N 78°37′19″W	Raleigh	
178	St. Mary's Chapel	St. Mary's Chapel	November 20, 1970 (#70000477)	900 Hillsborough St. 35°46′54″N 78°39′11″W	Raleigh	
179	St. Mary's College	St. Mary's College	December 19, 1978 (#78001981)	St. Marys and Hillsborough Sts. 35°46′56″N 78°39′09″W	Raleigh	
180	St. Matthews School	St. Matthews School	April 25, 2001 (#01000416)	US 401, 0.5 miles (0.80 km) northeast of NC 2213; 35°51′37″N 78°33′41″W	Raleigh	
181	St. Paul A.M.E. Church	St. Paul A.M.E. Church	November 5, 1987 (#80004607)	402 W. Edenton St. 35°46′54″N 78°38′44″W	Raleigh	
182	Seaboard Coast Line Railroad Company Office Building	Seaboard Coast Line Railroad Company Office Building	May 6, 1971 (#71000626)	413 N. Salisbury St. 35°47′08″N 78°38′25″W	Raleigh	Completed (with two stories) in 1862 on Halifax St., the building was home to one of the earliest North Carolina railroads, the Raleigh & Gaston, eventually incorporated into the 20th century's Seaboard Coast Line. Acquired by the state in the 1970s for use as an office building and moved to its present location on N. Salisbury St.
183	Small House	Small House	September 21, 1994 (#94001086)	310 Lake Boone Trail; 35°49′00″N 78°39′55″W	Raleigh	
184	G. Milton Small and Associates Office Building	G. Milton Small and Associates Office Building	September 21, 1994 (#94001085)	105 Brooks Ave. 35°47′22″N 78°40′25″W	Raleigh	
185	Frank and Mary Smith House		September 11, 2003 (#03000931)	2935 John Adams Rd. 35°34′34″N 78°41′07″W	Willow Spring	
186	Turner and Amelia Smith House		June 10, 2005 (#05000549)	12244 Old Stage Rd. 35°34′44″N 78°41′38″W	Willow Spring	
187	South Brick House		May 27, 2014 (#14000265)	112 E. South Ave. 35°58′42″N 78°30′44″W	Wake Forest	
188	Spring Hill	Spring Hill	December 29, 1983 (#83004003)	705 Barbour Dr. 35°46′21″N 78°40′34″W	Raleigh	
189	State Bank of North Carolina	State Bank of North Carolina	July 1, 1970 (#70000478)	11 New Bern Ave. 35°46′59″N 78°38′15″W	Raleigh	
190	State Capitol Holiday Inn	State Capitol Holiday Inn	May 21, 2026 (#100013051)	320 Hillsborough St; 35°46′51″N 78°38′39″W	Raleigh	
191	Wayland H. and Mamie Burt Stevens House		December 10, 2014 (#14001023)	408 N. Ennis St. 35°35′22″N 78°47′33″W	Fuquay-Varina	
192	Sunnyside	Sunnyside	October 15, 2001 (#01001113)	210 S. Selma Rd. 35°46′39″N 78°21′46″W	Wendell	
193	Thompson House		September 15, 2005 (#05001030)	2528 Old NC 98; 35°58′10″N 78°34′08″W	Wake Forest	
194	Tucker Carriage House	Tucker Carriage House	February 13, 1975 (#75001297)	114 St. Mary's St. 35°46′55″N 78°39′02″W	Raleigh	
195	Garland Scott and Toler Moore Tucker House	Garland Scott and Toler Moore Tucker House	December 10, 2014 (#14001024)	418 N. Person St. 35°47′07″N 78°38′04″W	Raleigh	
196	John T. and Mary Turner House	John T. and Mary Turner House	May 16, 2002 (#02000499)	1002 Oberlin Rd. 35°47′52″N 78°39′37″W	Raleigh	
197	Utley-Council House	Utley-Council House	May 16, 2002 (#02000498)	NC 1390, near jct. with NC 1387; 35°39′48″N 78°46′02″W	Apex	
198	Vanguard Park Historic District	Vanguard Park Historic District	May 9, 2003 (#03000391)	Roughly bounded by McCarthy St., Whitaker Mill Rd., Pine Ave., and Hudson St. 35°48′26″N 78°38′20″W	Raleigh	
199	Varina Commercial Historic District		January 31, 1990 (#89002351)	Broad and Fayetteville Sts. between Stewart St. and Ransdell Rd. 35°35′34″N 78°47′40″W	Fuquay-Varina	
200	Wachovia Building Company Contemporary Ranch House	Wachovia Building Company Contemporary Ranch House	December 10, 2014 (#14001025)	823 Bryan St. 35°47′42″N 78°39′17″W	Raleigh	
201	Wake Forest Historic District		December 18, 2003 (#03001301)	Bounded by Oak St., RR tracks, Holding St., W. Vernon Ave., S. Wingate, N. Wingate, Durham Rd. and N. College Sts. 35°58′55″N 78°30′44″W	Wake Forest	
202	Wakefield Dairy Complex		January 15, 2003 (#02001719)	Western side of Falls of Neuse Rd., 1.2 miles (1.9 km) north of the Neuse River; 35°57′28″N 78°34′07″W	Wake Forest	
203	Wakefields		October 16, 1974 (#74001378)	Southeast of Creedmoor off U.S. 15A; 36°00′08″N 78°31′23″W	Wake Forest	
204	Wakelon School	Wakelon School	May 13, 1976 (#76001345)	Arendell St. 35°49′51″N 78°19′15″W	Zebulon	
205	Walnut Hill Cotton Gin	Walnut Hill Cotton Gin	August 14, 1986 (#86001631)	NC 2509; 35°43′58″N 78°27′17″W	Knightdale	
206	Walnut Hill Historic District	Walnut Hill Historic District	October 6, 2000 (#00001183)	Along Mial Plantation Rd., jct with Major Slade Rd. and Smithfield Rd. 35°44′02″N 78°26′44″W	Knightdale	
207	Washington Graded and High School	Washington Graded and High School	February 2, 2005 (#04001584)	1000 Fayetteville St. 35°46′08″N 78°38′39″W	Raleigh	
208	Paul and Ellen Welles House		January 29, 2009 (#08001388)	3227 Birnamwood Rd. 35°46′08″N 78°38′39″W	Raleigh	
209	Wendell Boulevard Historic District	Wendell Boulevard Historic District	June 3, 2009 (#09000382)	Roughly bounded by Wendell Blvd., Mattox St., Old Zebulon Rd., Buffalo St. and Main St. 35°47′04″N 78°21′58″W	Wendell	
210	Wendell Commercial Historic District	Wendell Commercial Historic District	July 31, 1998 (#98000947)	Roughly along jct. of Main St. and Third St. 35°46′52″N 78°22′15″W	Wendell	
211	West Raleigh Historic District	West Raleigh Historic District	December 18, 2003 (#03001300)	Roughly bounded by Mayview Rd., Enterprise St., Hillsbourgh St. and Faircloth St. 35°47′42″N 78°40′24″W	Raleigh	
212	White-Holman House	White-Holman House	April 16, 1971 (#71000627)	206 New Bern Pl. 35°46′46″N 78°38′11″W	Raleigh	
213	Leonidas R. Wyatt House	Leonidas R. Wyatt House	July 5, 1990 (#90001030)	107 S Bloodworth St. 35°46′43″N 78°37′59″W	Raleigh	
214	Yates Mill	Yates Mill	February 26, 1970 (#70000479)	Lake Wheeler Rd. 35°43′07″N 78°41′18″W	Raleigh	
215	Dr. Lawrence Branch Young House		September 25, 2003 (#03000966)	119 W. Young St. 35°55′40″N 78°27′28″W	Rolesville	
216	Zebulon Historic District		August 22, 2022 (#100007603)	Roughly bounded by North Arendell and East Gannon Aves., North Gill, East Horton, West Judd, East and West Sycamore, West Vance, North Wakefield, and North Whitley Sts., Rotary Dr., and former Raleigh and Pamlico Sound RR tracks. 35°49′27″N 78°18′53″W	Zebulon	

== See also ==
- National Register of Historic Places listings in North Carolina
- List of National Historic Landmarks in North Carolina
