= Riley Hill =

Riley Hill may refer to:

- Riley Hill (actor), an American actor who appeared in both film and television from the 1930s through the 1980s
- Riley Hill, North Carolina, an unincorporated community in mideastern Wake County
