= Norburn =

Norburn is a surname. Notable people with the surname include:

- Oliver Norburn (born 1992), English footballer
- Peter Norburn (1930–2017), English rugby league footballer

== See also ==
- Norburn Terrace, historic house in North Carolina, U.S.
