= Wachovia Building Company Contemporary Ranch House =

Historic house in North Carolina, United States

- U.S. National Register of Historic Places
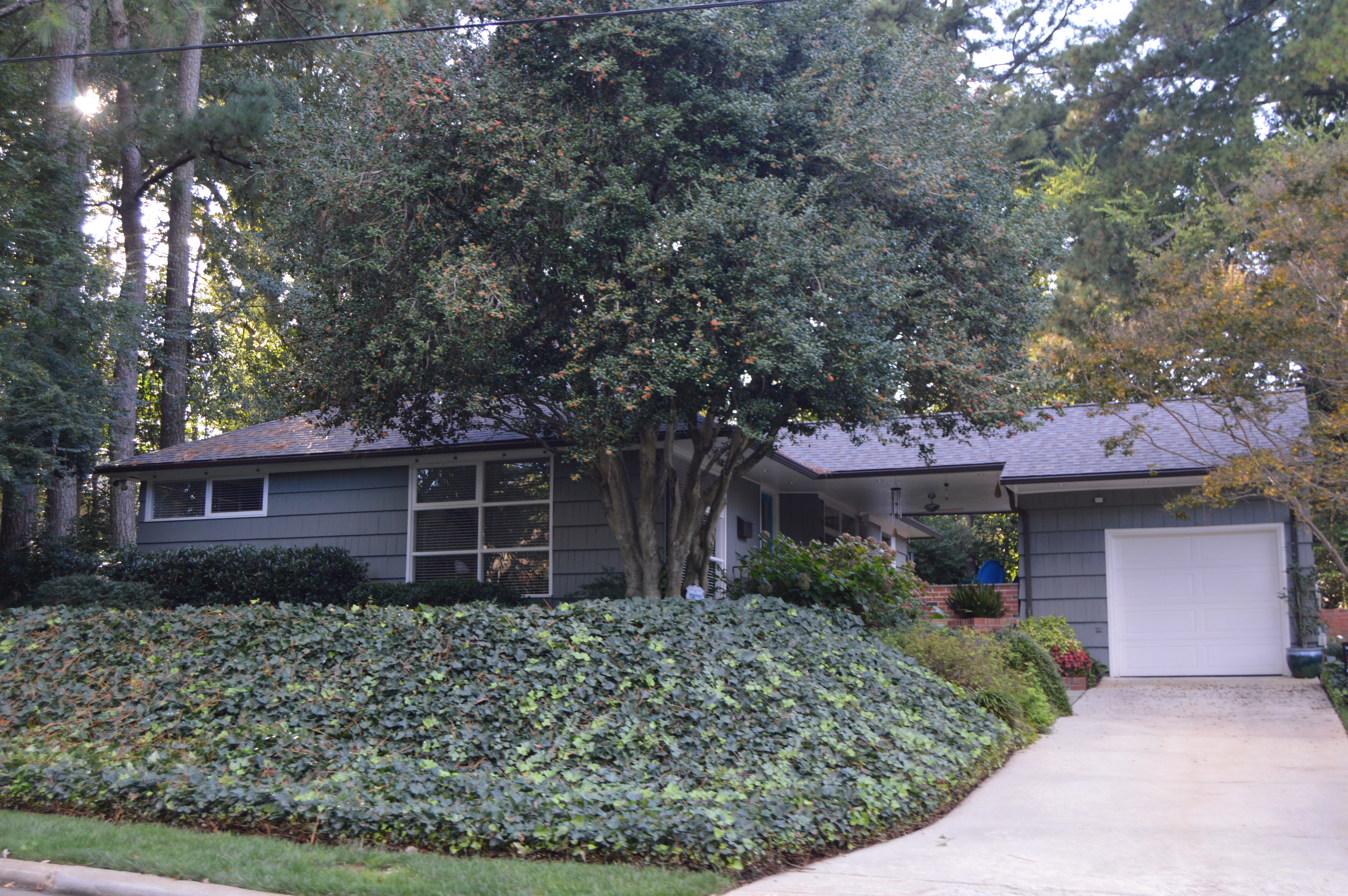
- Front of the house

- Location within North Carolina Location within the United States
- Location: 823 Bryan St., Raleigh, North Carolina
- Coordinates: 35°47′42″N 78°39′16″W
- Area: 0.34 acres (0.14 ha)
- Built: 1951
- Built by: Wachovia Building Company
- Architect: Ed Richards
- Architectural style: Contemporary Ranch
- MPS: Post-World War II and Modern Architecture in Raleigh, North Carolina, 1945-1965
- NRHP reference No.: 14001025
- Added to NRHP: December 10, 2014

Wachovia Building Company Contemporary Ranch House, also known as the Arthur McKimmon II House, is a historic home located in the Cameron Village neighborhood of Raleigh, North Carolina. It is located east of the Cameron Village Historic District. The house was built in 1951, and is a single-story, double-pile, Ranch-style house. It has a low pitched hipped roof and a gable-roofed breezeway joining the house to a side-gabled, single-car garage.

It was listed on the National Register of Historic Places in 2014.
