= Battery Heights Historic District =

Historic district in North Carolina, United States

- U.S. National Register of Historic Places
- U.S. Historic district
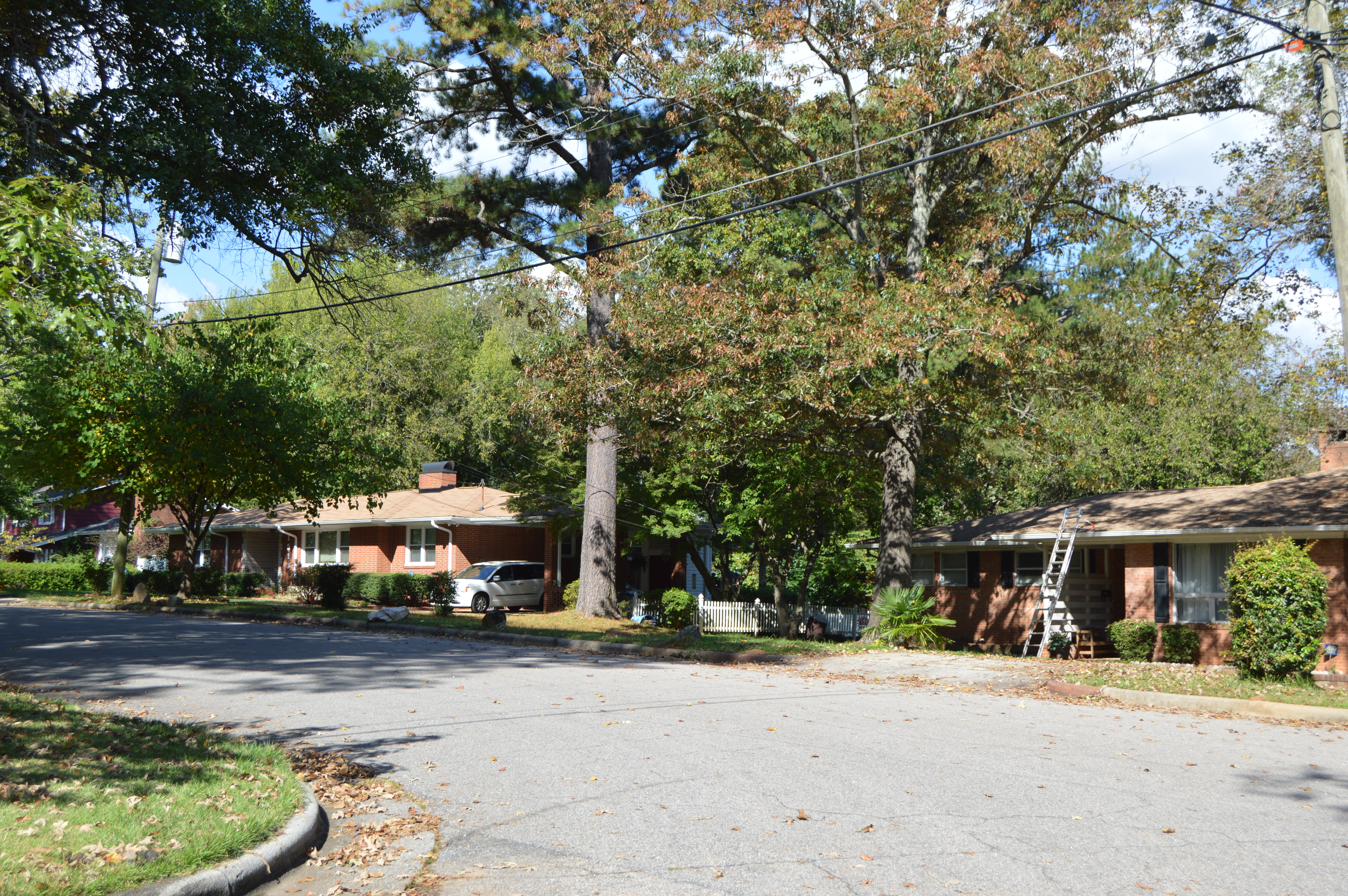
- Houses on Martin Street

- Location within North Carolina Location within the United States
- Location: Bounded roughly by East Martin St. on the north, Battery Dr. on the east, East Davie St. on the south, and Sherrybrook Dr. on the west, Raleigh, North Carolina
- Coordinates: 35°46′31″N 78°36′54″W
- Area: 11 acres (4.5 ha)
- Built: 1956-1964
- Built by: George Exum, Antonio Ozart, John Gatling
- Architectural style: Ranch, Split Level
- MPS: Post-World War II and Modern Architecture in Raleigh, North Carolina, 1945-1965
- NRHP reference No.: 10001111
- Added to NRHP: January 3, 2011

The Battery Heights Historic District is a historic neighborhood and national historic district located southeast of downtown Raleigh, North Carolina, USA. Named for the earthen batteries stationed in the area during the Civil War, the neighborhood has a suburban character, despite its close proximity to the city center.

The district is roughly bounded by East Martin Street on the north, Battery Drive on the east, East Davie Street on the south, and Sherrybrook Drive (originally Cox Street) on the west. It has a highly intact collection of 18 contributing buildings built between 1956-1964 and is a good example of Raleigh's post-World War II suburban development. Battery Heights' prominent architectural styles include Ranch and Split-Level homes primarily built in brick, stone and concrete.

Battery Heights was one of a few subdivisions planned for the African American community in Raleigh. Its original owners and residents included physicians, educators, builders and government agency employees—one of whom, George Exum, was as the general contractor for several of the homes. The neighborhood is rapidly renewing since the mid-2010s and many new homes are being built on vacant lots and existing homes are being repaired. The newly renovated Robert's Park and Community Center is situated centrally in this neighborhood. The park has a children's playground, tennis court, basketball court, small baseball field and community center. Raleigh National Cemetery encompasses 7 acres in Battery Height's neighborhood.

Battery Heights was listed on the National Register of Historic Places in January 2011.

== See also ==
- List of Registered Historic Places in North Carolina
