= Occidental Life Insurance Company Building =

- U.S. National Register of Historic Places
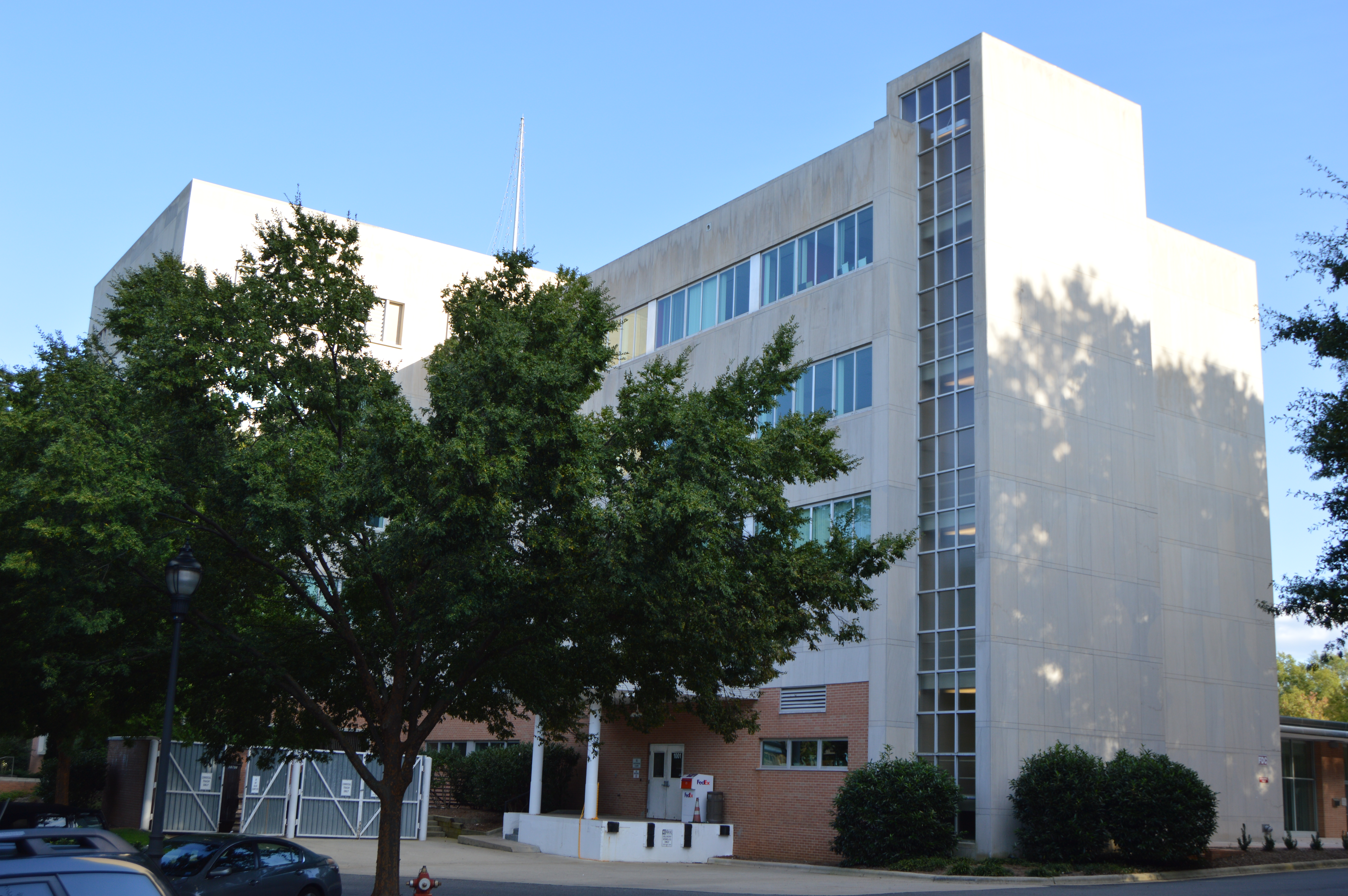
- Northwestern angle

- Location within North Carolina Location within the United States
- Location: 1001 Wade Ave., Raleigh, North Carolina
- Coordinates: 35°47′55″N 78°39′25″W
- Area: 4.4 acres (1.8 ha)
- Built: 1956
- Architect: Kemp, Bunch & Jackson; Leif Valand
- Architectural style: International Style
- NRHP reference No.: 03000929
- Added to NRHP: September 11, 2003

Occidental Life Insurance Company Building is a historic office building located at Raleigh, North Carolina. The building is located in Cameron Village, North Carolina's first suburban shopping center. It was built in 1956, and is a four-story, 68,000 square-foot steel frame structure encapsulated in concrete. The building was design by architecture firm Kemp, Bunch & Jackson and in the International Style. It has a brick base, limestone walls, aluminum windows with green-tinted glass, and entrance canopies with rounded aluminum eaves. Prior to moving to this building, the Occidental Life Insurance Company offices were housed in the Professional Building for nearly 30 years.

It was listed on the National Register of Historic Places in 2003.
