= Rochester Heights Historic District =

Historic district in North Carolina, United States

- U.S. National Register of Historic Places
- U.S. Historic district
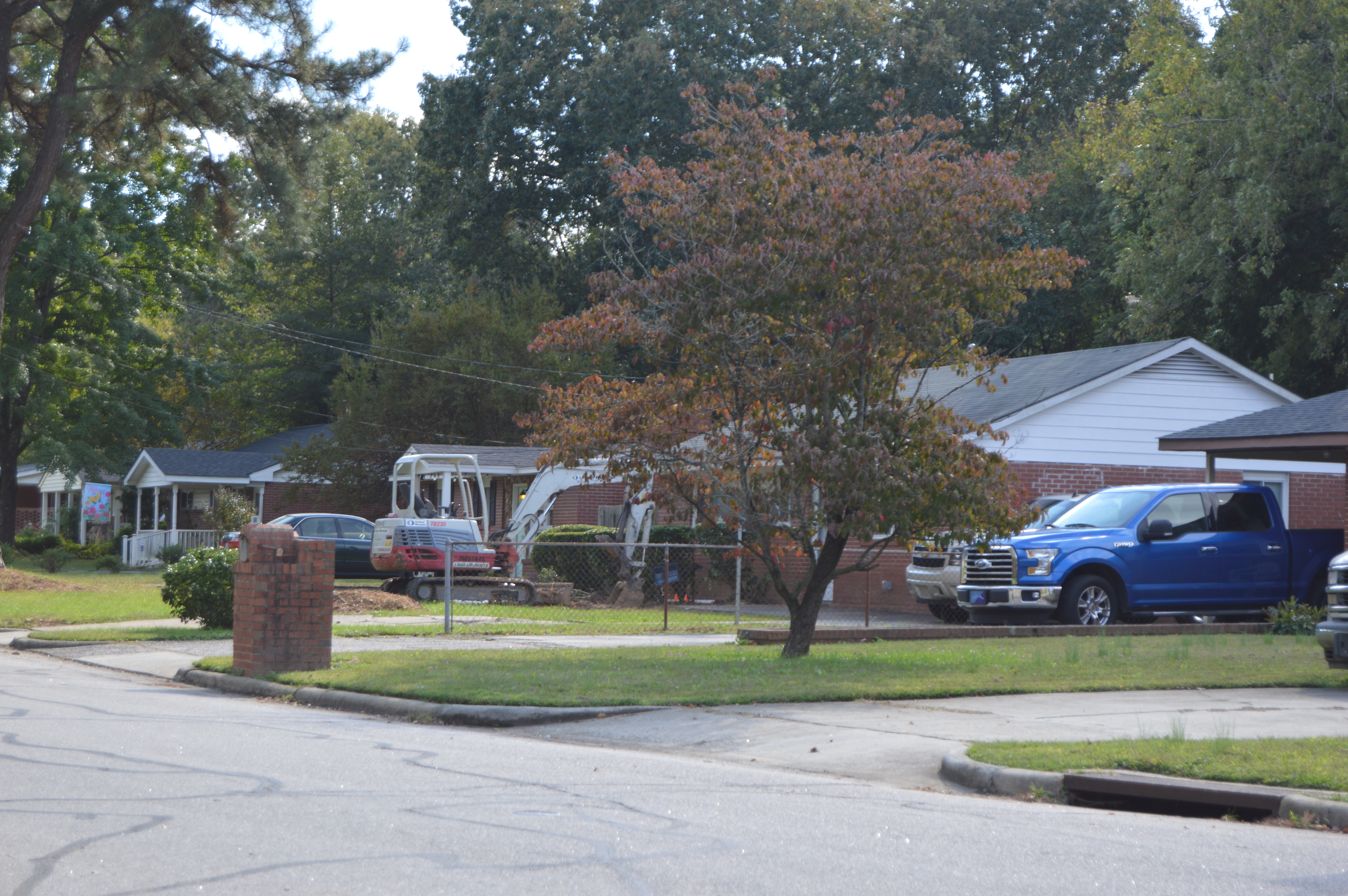
- Houses on Hadley Drive

- Location within North Carolina Location within the United States
- Location: Roughly bounded by Bailey Dr., Boaz Rd., Calloway Dr., and Garner Rd., Raleigh, North Carolina
- Coordinates: 35°45′16″N 78°37′40″W
- Area: 39 acres (16 ha)
- Built: 1957-1964
- Architect: Millard R. Peebles, Sidney Cooley, Willis Hunter
- Architectural style: Ranch; Split Level
- MPS: Post-World War II and Modern Architecture in Raleigh, North Carolina, 1945-1965
- NRHP reference No.: 11000893
- Added to NRHP: December 7, 2011

Rochester Heights Historic District is a historic post-World War II neighborhood and national historic district located 1 1/2 miles southeast of downtown Raleigh, North Carolina. The district encompasses 137 contributing buildings and 1 contributing structure and was developed between about 1957 and 1964. The homes are predominantly constructed in the Ranch and Split-level home styles.

It was listed on the National Register of Historic Places in December 2011.
