= North Carolina Agricultural Experiment Station Cottage =

Historic house in North Carolina, United States

- U.S. National Register of Historic Places
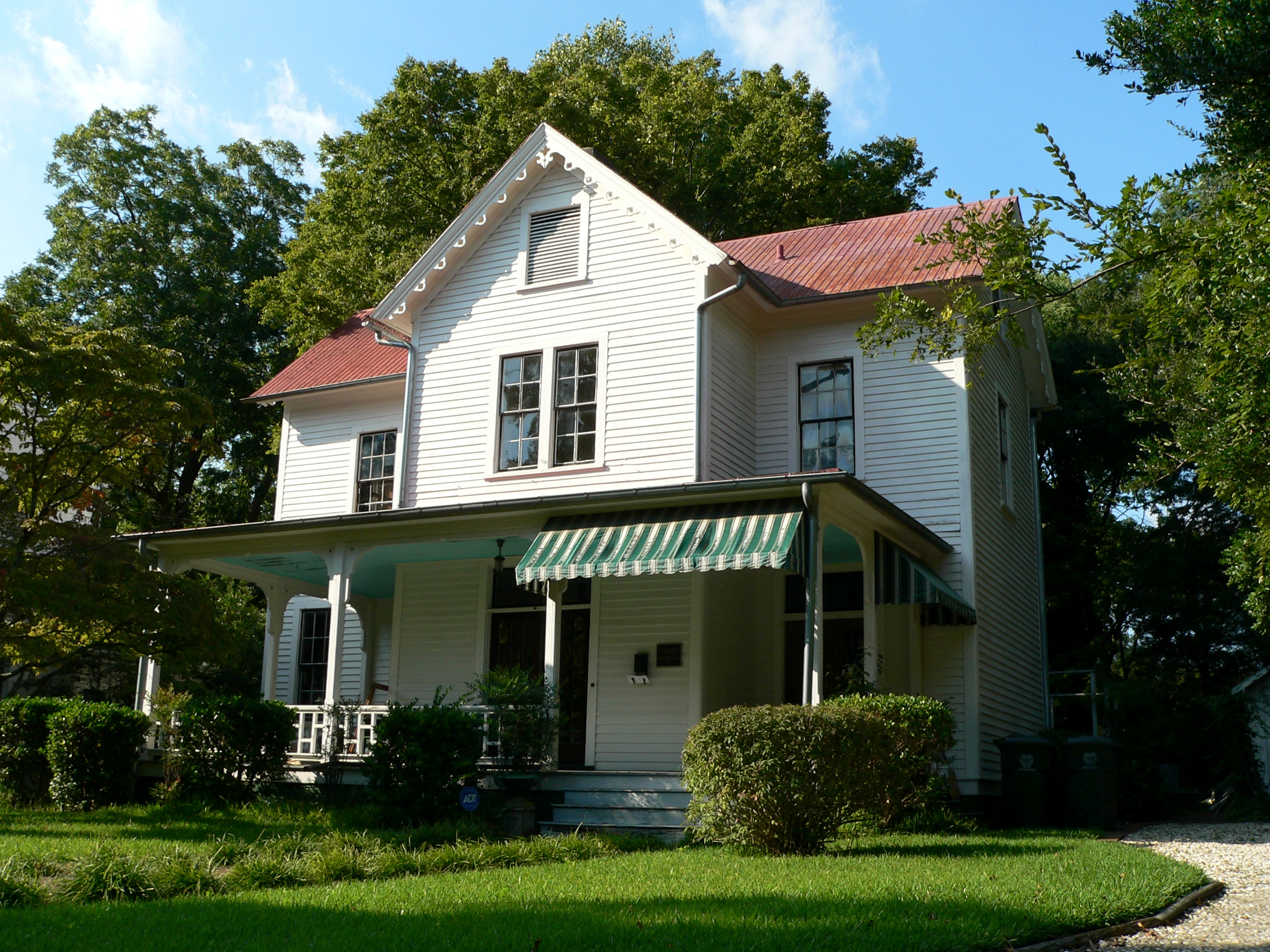
- NC Agricultural Experiment Station Cottage, September 2014

- Location within North Carolina Location within the United States
- Location: 2714 Vanderbilt Ave., Raleigh, North Carolina
- Coordinates: 35°47′30″N 78°40′20″W
- Area: 0.3 acres (0.12 ha)
- Built: 1886
- Architectural style: Gothic, Italianate, Queen Anne
- NRHP reference No.: 01001112
- Added to NRHP: October 15, 2001

North Carolina Agricultural Experiment Station Cottage, also known as College Station and Hezouri House, is a historic home located at Raleigh, North Carolina. It built in 1886 to house the residence and office of the North Carolina Agricultural Experiment Station, It is a two-story, frame farmhouse with elements of Gothic Revival, Italianate, and Queen Anne style architecture. It has a cross-gable roof and features sawnwork decoration on the front porch and gables. The building housed the first agricultural experiment station in North Carolina. The station closed in 1926, and it was subsequently used as a residence.

It was listed on the National Register of Historic Places in 2001.
