= Rogers-Whitaker-Haywood House =

Historic house in North Carolina, United States

- U.S. National Register of Historic Places
- Location within North Carolina Location within the United States
- Location: NC 2044 and U.S. Route 401, near Wake Crossroads, North Carolina
- Coordinates: 35°53′50″N 78°30′30″W
- Area: 4.7 acres (1.9 ha)
- Built: 1771
- Architectural style: Federal
- NRHP reference No.: 85002418
- Added to NRHP: September 19, 1985

The Rogers-Whitaker-Haywood House, also known as the Fabius Haywood House, is a historic home located near Wake Crossroads (formerly Rogers Crossroads), Wake County, North Carolina, an unincorporated community northeast of the state capital Raleigh. The original 1 1/2-story house, now the west end, was built in 1771. It has a stone exterior chimney on the west end. Now one large room, it may originally have been arranged as a hall-parlor plan; it formerly had a door between the two south windows and a straight stair with winders in the northeast corner.

About 1812 the house was enlarged by the addition of a free-standing second room to the east of the first building. Either soon or immediately, the space between the two buildings was enclosed to form a central passage, with two shed rooms on the north side, and the stair was rebuilt approximately in its original location, but opening into the passage. There is no visible interior woodwork from the 1771 period; the entire interior is finished with vernacular Federal woodwork. Although both main chimneys are built of stone, doubled shouldered, and with later brick stacks, the stonework of the east chimney consists of larger and finer cut stone, suggesting a later construction date than the west chimney.

The northeast shed room is heated by a fireplace with an exterior chimney. To the east, between the two chimneys, is a pair of lighted pent closets with early shelving. The southeast room has a door to the exterior sheltered by a shed porch with thick turned early 19th century columns. The side door, typical of North Carolina vernacular design, suggests that the exterior kitchen was to the east of the main house. Between the unheated northwest shed room, which opens only into the southwest room, and the passage is a lighted closet with a built-in beaufat consisting of glazed doors over drawers over a lower cupboard section. There is a similar beaufat, with arch-top lights, in the large southwest room. The closet opens only into the passage. The three principal rooms have flat paneled wainscot; the passage wainscot is a double range of panels with the stiles "breaking joint" like brickwork. All doors in the house are raised paneled on the "good" side and flat paneled on the back and are hung on their original butt hinges.

In the garret, the stair rises into an unheated central space the width of the passage below. To the east and west are heated chambers with simple transitional Georgian / Federal chimney pieces. The central space is lighted by one dormer window on the north wall. This gabled dormer was reconstructed in the 1970s within the original framed opening. The reconstruction is probably inaccurate; the original probably had a shed roof. The chambers are lighted only by pairs of casement windows with their original hinges on either side of the chimneys.

In the 1970s the house retained all of its Federal period interior paint colors. The passage and southeast room had dark olive green trim with doors grain-painted as yellow pine; the southwest room had white trim, light blue plaster, and grain-painted pine doors; the pent closets had blue trim and shelves with white-painted wood sheathed walls; the passage closet beaufat was blue with the glazed doors painted red; the northeast room had white trim; the garret chambers had green trim; the center room in the garret had blue trim, with white-painted wood sheathing above the wainscot and a balustrade with a red newel and yellow square pickets.

In the yard in the 1970s, a late 19th-century kitchen survived northwest of the house. It had been moved in the 20th century from a position southeast of the house and its chimney demolished. Northwest of the house, an early unlined well was embellished in the 1970s by an early 19th-century combination well shelter and storage building which formerly stood on the original site of the 1775 Lane-Bennett house near Macedonia in Wake County.

In the early 1970s, other interesting features on the place included, west of the house, the original roadbed of the Oxford-Smithfield Stage Road; the "cook's house" (now collapsed/demolished), a late 19th-century replacement of an earlier stone chimneyed structure which burned; a 19th-century packhouse; a late 19th-century outhouse; and a crude 20th-century shelter for an automobile.

In September 1985, the Rogers-Whitaker-Haywood House was listed on the National Register of Historic Places.

== See also ==
- List of Registered Historic Places in North Carolina
