= Paschal House =

Historic house in North Carolina, United States

- U.S. National Register of Historic Places
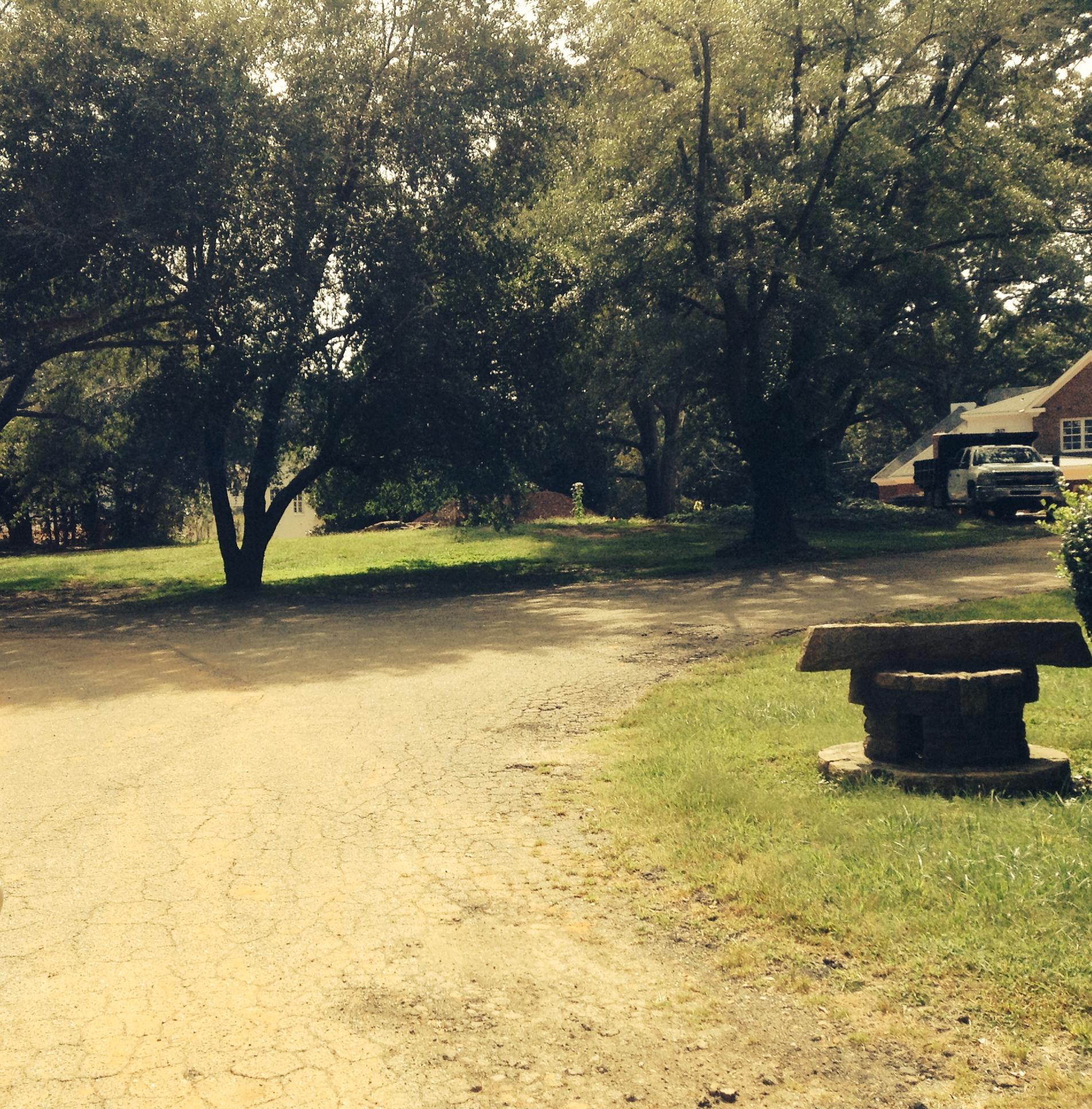
- Entrance of Paschal House, December 2014

- Location within North Carolina Location within the United States
- Location: 3334 Alamance Dr., Raleigh, North Carolina
- Coordinates: 35°49′41″N 78°39′48″W
- Area: 2.7 acres (1.1 ha)
- Built: 1950
- Built by: Davidson and Jones
- Architect: Fitzgibbon, James W.
- Architectural style: Wrightian
- MPS: Early Modern Architecture Associated with NCSU School of Design Faculty MPS
- NRHP reference No.: 94001088
- Added to NRHP: September 21, 1994

Paschal House was a historic home located at Raleigh, Wake County, North Carolina, United States. It was built in 1950, and was a one-story, irregularly massed, Modern Movement / Wrightian-style dwelling. It had a picturesque composition of stone walls, multiple low-sloped gables with deep overhangs, and expanses of glazed wall. The house was demolished in 2013.

It was listed on the National Register of Historic Places in 1994.
