= Paul and Ellen Welles House =

Historic house in North Carolina, United States

- U.S. National Register of Historic Places
- Location within North Carolina Location within the United States
- Location: 3227 Birnamwood Rd., Raleigh, North Carolina
- Coordinates: 35°48′42″N 78°40′54″W
- Area: 1.9 acres (0.77 ha)
- Built: 1956
- Built by: Edwards, Jim, Co.
- Architect: Pruden & Scott
- Architectural style: Modern Movement, Split level
- NRHP reference No.: 08001388
- Added to NRHP: January 29, 2009

Paul and Ellen Welles House, also known as the Robert and Anne Dahle House, is a historic home located at Raleigh, Wake County, North Carolina. It was built in 1956, and is a two-story, split level Modern Movement-style dwelling. It has a brick-veneered lower level and a slightly cantilevered upper level sheathed with board-and-batten siding. It features an asymmetrical side-gable roof with wide overhanging eaves.

It was listed on the National Register of Historic Places in 2009.
