= Carolina Coach Garage and Shop =

Historic building in North Carolina, US

- U.S. National Register of Historic Places
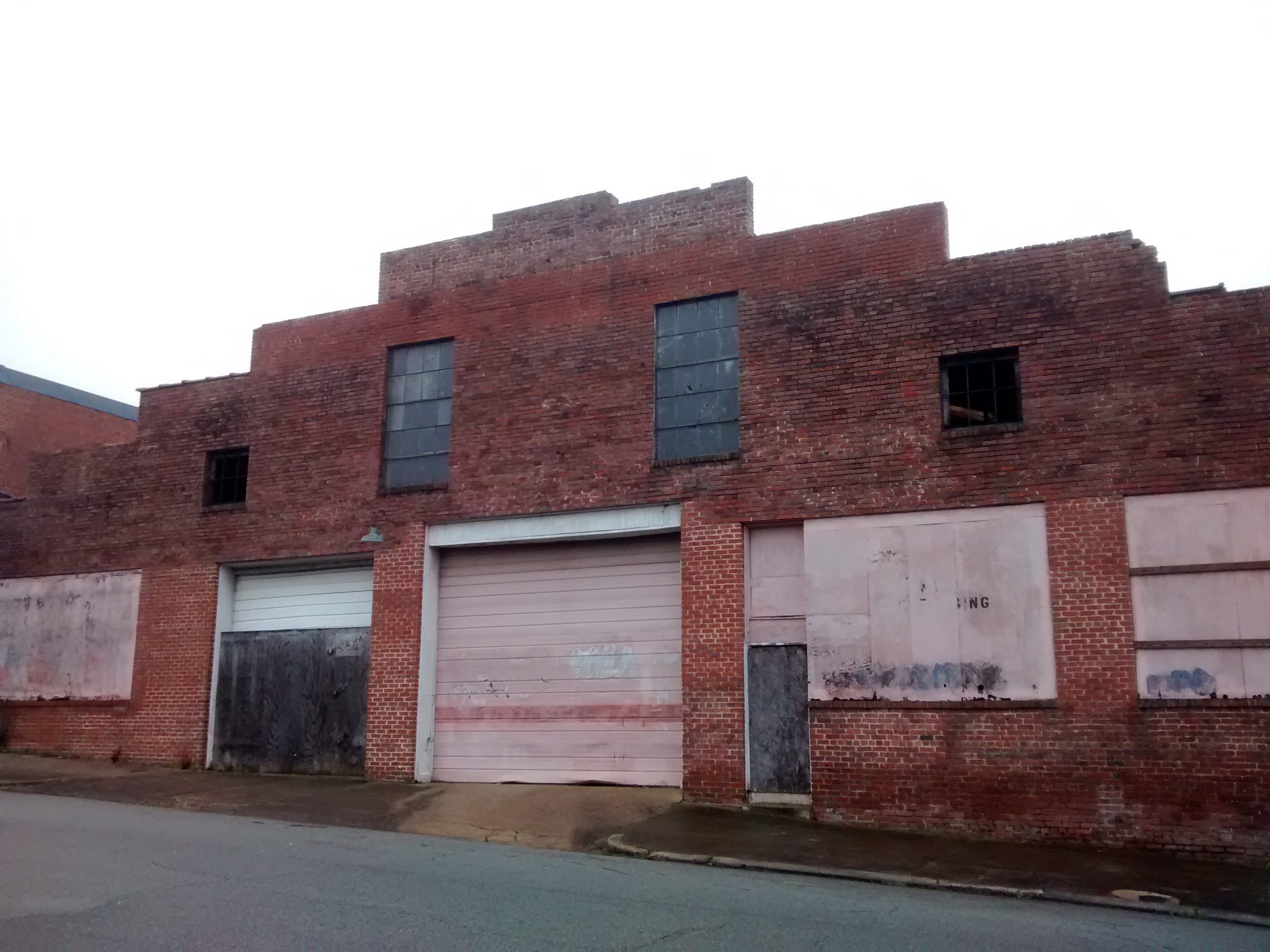
- Carolina Coach Garage and Shop, December 2014

- Location within North Carolina Location within the United States
- Location: 510 E. Davie St., Raleigh, North Carolina
- Coordinates: 35°46′37″N 78°37′55″W
- Area: 0.6 acres (0.24 ha)
- Built: 1926
- NRHP reference No.: 09000661
- Added to NRHP: August 27, 2009

Carolina Coach Garage and Shop is a historic intercity bus garage located at Raleigh, North Carolina. It was built in 1926, and is a one-story, rectangular building measuring approximately 90 feet by 140 feet. It features a stepped parapet with five levels with original terra cotta coping caps that hides a truss supported gabled roof. The building housed the Carolina Coach Company maintenance facilities until 1939.

It was listed on the National Register of Historic Places in 2009.
