= Heartsfield–Perry Farm =

Historic farm in North Carolina, United States

- U.S. National Register of Historic Places
- Location within North Carolina Location within the United States
- Location: NC 2224, 0.1 mi. SE of NC 2300, Rolesville, North Carolina
- Coordinates: 35°54′55″N 78°23′33″W
- Area: 22.6 acres (9.1 ha)
- Built: c. 1790, c. 1840
- Architectural style: Federal, Greek Revival, et al.
- NRHP reference No.: 02001728
- Added to NRHP: January 23, 2003

The Heartsfield–Perry Farm is a historic home and farm located at Rolesville, Wake County, North Carolina, a satellite town of the state capital Raleigh. The original one-room house was built in the 1790s, with a Greek Revival style update made about 1840. It is a two-story house with two-story rear ell and one-story rear shed addition. It features a double-tier Greek-Revival-style—porch and low hipped roof. The interior of the house retains some Federal style design elements. Also on the property are the contributing detached kitchen (c. 1840), smokehouse / woodshed (c. 1840), privy (c. 1900), doctor's office (c. 1840), mule barn (c. 1805), pack house (c. 1940), horse barn (c. 1940), feed barn (c. 1840), two tobacco barns (c. 1930, c. 1950), the family cemetery, and the agricultural landscape.

In January 2003, the Heartsfield–Perry Farm was listed on the National Register of Historic Places.

== See also ==
- List of Registered Historic Places in North Carolina
