= Tucker Carriage House =

Historic building in North Carolina, US

- U.S. National Register of Historic Places
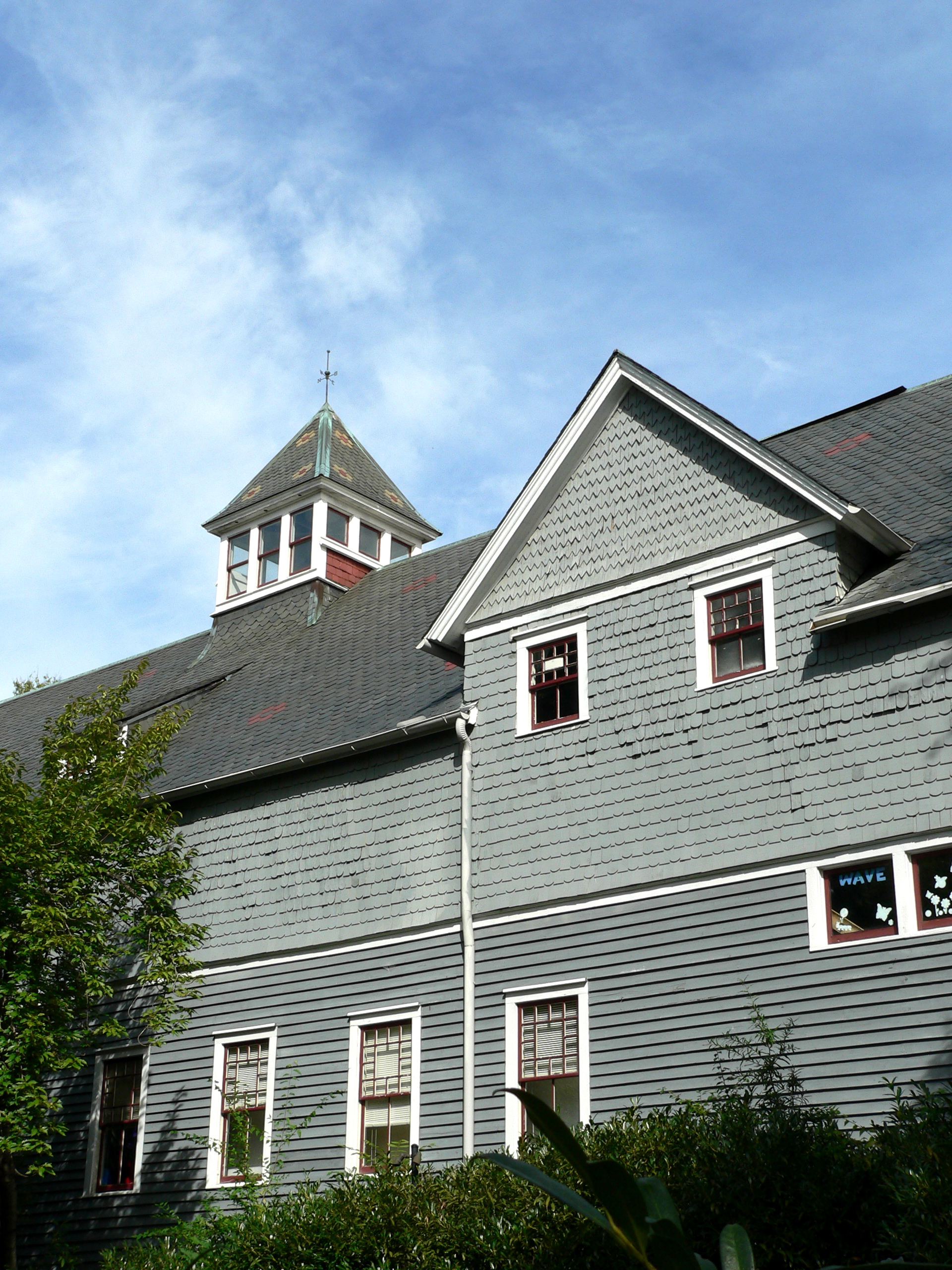

- Location within North Carolina Location within the United States
- Location: 114 Saint Mary's Street, Raleigh, North Carolina
- Coordinates: 35°46′55″N 78°39′02″W
- Area: 2 acres (0.81 ha)
- Built: c. 1883
- Architect: Percival, William
- Architectural style: Queen Anne, Shingle
- NRHP reference No.: 75001297
- Added to NRHP: February 13, 1975

The Tucker Carriage House is a historic carriage house located at Raleigh, North Carolina, United States. It is a large, three-story outbuilding that is the only remaining structure from the estate of Rufus Sylvester Tucker, a Confederate army officer and prominent merchant in post-Civil War Raleigh. It is believed to have been built around 1883, when Tucker purchased materials for a "wagon shed", but does not appear on maps of the area until 1909.

The carriage house is 35 feet (11 m) wide and 100 feet (30 m) long, and originally housed the estate's wheeled vehicles as well as the horses and mules that pulled them. The building is sheathed in clapboard on the first floor, and shakes on the second. The roof is covered with slate shingles and is capped by a square cupola that served to ventilate the interior.
