= Cameron Village Historic District =

Historic district in North Carolina, United States

- U.S. National Register of Historic Places
- U.S. Historic district
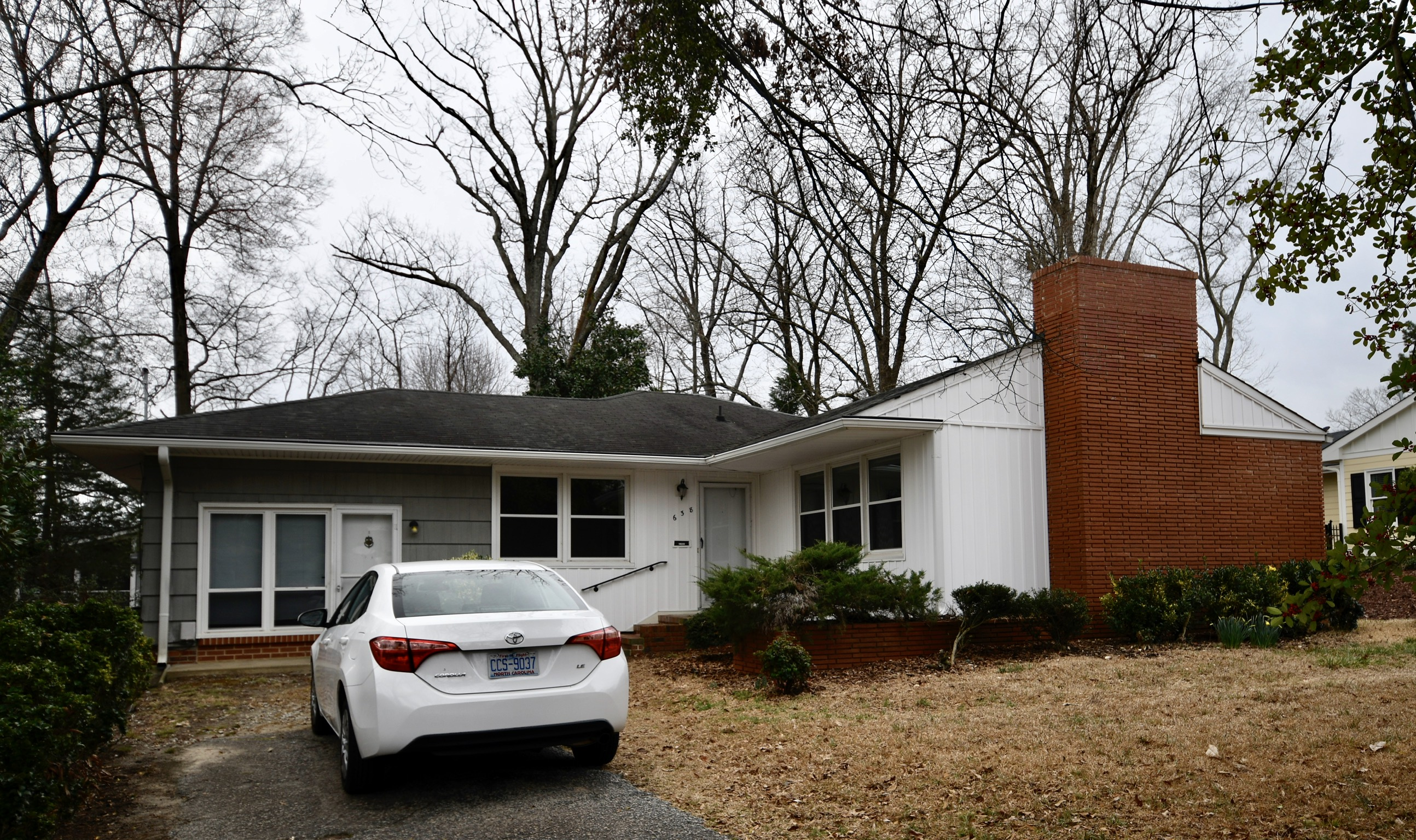
- Suburban Houses in Cameron Village Historic District, August 2014

- Location within North Carolina Location within the United States
- Location: Roughly bounded by Daniels St., Wade Ave., Woodburn Rd., & Smallwood Dr., Raleigh, North Carolina
- Coordinates: 35°47′38″N 78°39′27″W
- Area: 43 acres (17 ha)
- Built: 1950-1955
- Built by: Cameron Village, Inc.; Raleigh Building Company; Wachovia Building Company
- Architect: Valand, Leif; Davis, Charles W. Jr.
- Architectural style: Ranch; Modern Movement
- MPS: Post-World War II and Modern Architecture in Raleigh, North Carolina, 1945-1965
- NRHP reference No.: 11000956
- Added to NRHP: December 22, 2011

Cameron Village Historic District in Raleigh, North Carolina is a national historic district listed in 2011 on the National Register of Historic Places. The district encompasses 93 contributing buildings and 1 contributing object and was developed between about 1950 and 1955. It is considered North Carolina's first planned mixed-use development.

Nearby Village District Shopping Center is not included in the Historic District.

== Gallery ==
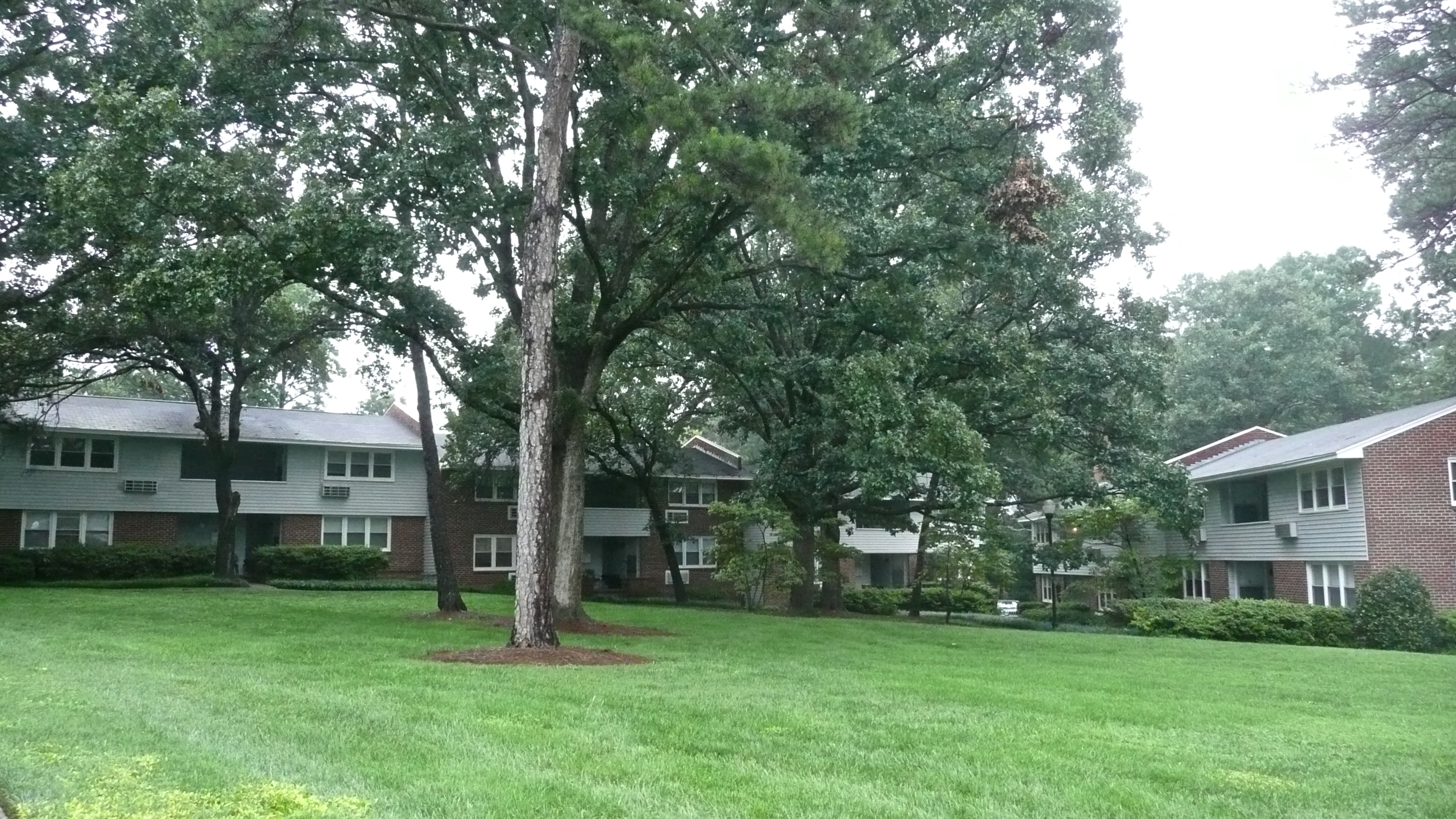
Condominiums near Cameron Village

== See also ==
- Cameron Village
- List of Registered Historic Places in Wake County, North Carolina
