= Rufus J. Ivey House =

Historic house in North Carolina, United States

- U.S. National Register of Historic Places
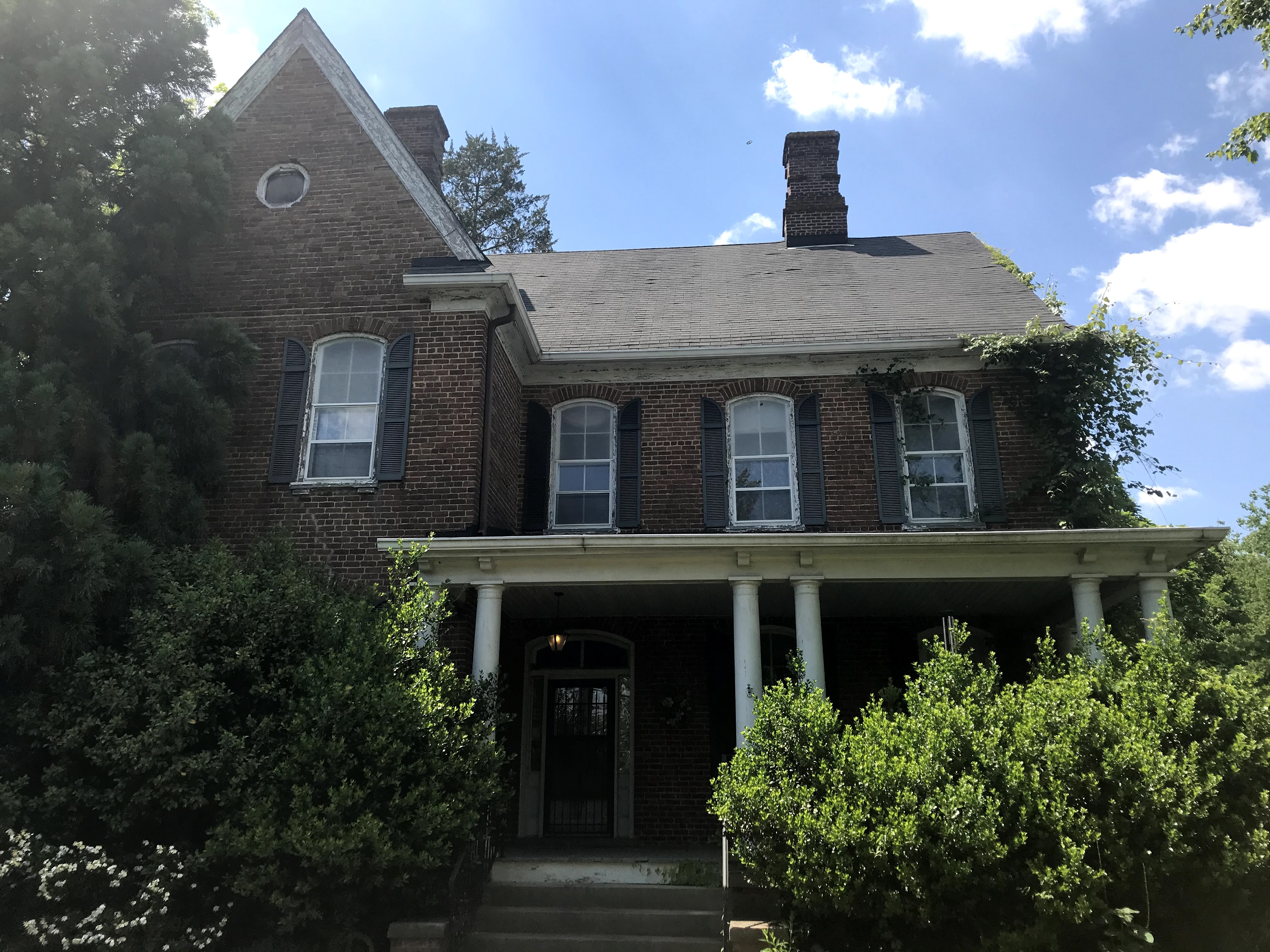

- Location within North Carolina Location within the United States
- Location: 6115 Louisburg, near Raleigh, North Carolina
- Coordinates: 35°51′35″N 78°33′12″W
- Area: 1.5 acres (0.61 ha)
- Built: c. 1872
- Architectural style: Italianate
- MPS: Wake County MPS
- NRHP reference No.: 06000223
- Added to NRHP: April 5, 2006

Rufus J. Ivey House is a historic home located near Raleigh, Wake County, North Carolina. It was built about 1872, and is a two-story, L-shaped, Italianate-style brick dwelling with a steeply pitched cross-gable roof. It features a one-story porch with a low hipped roof.

It was listed on the National Register of Historic Places in 2006.
