= G. Dewey and Elma Arndt House =

Historic house in North Carolina, United States

- U.S. National Register of Historic Places
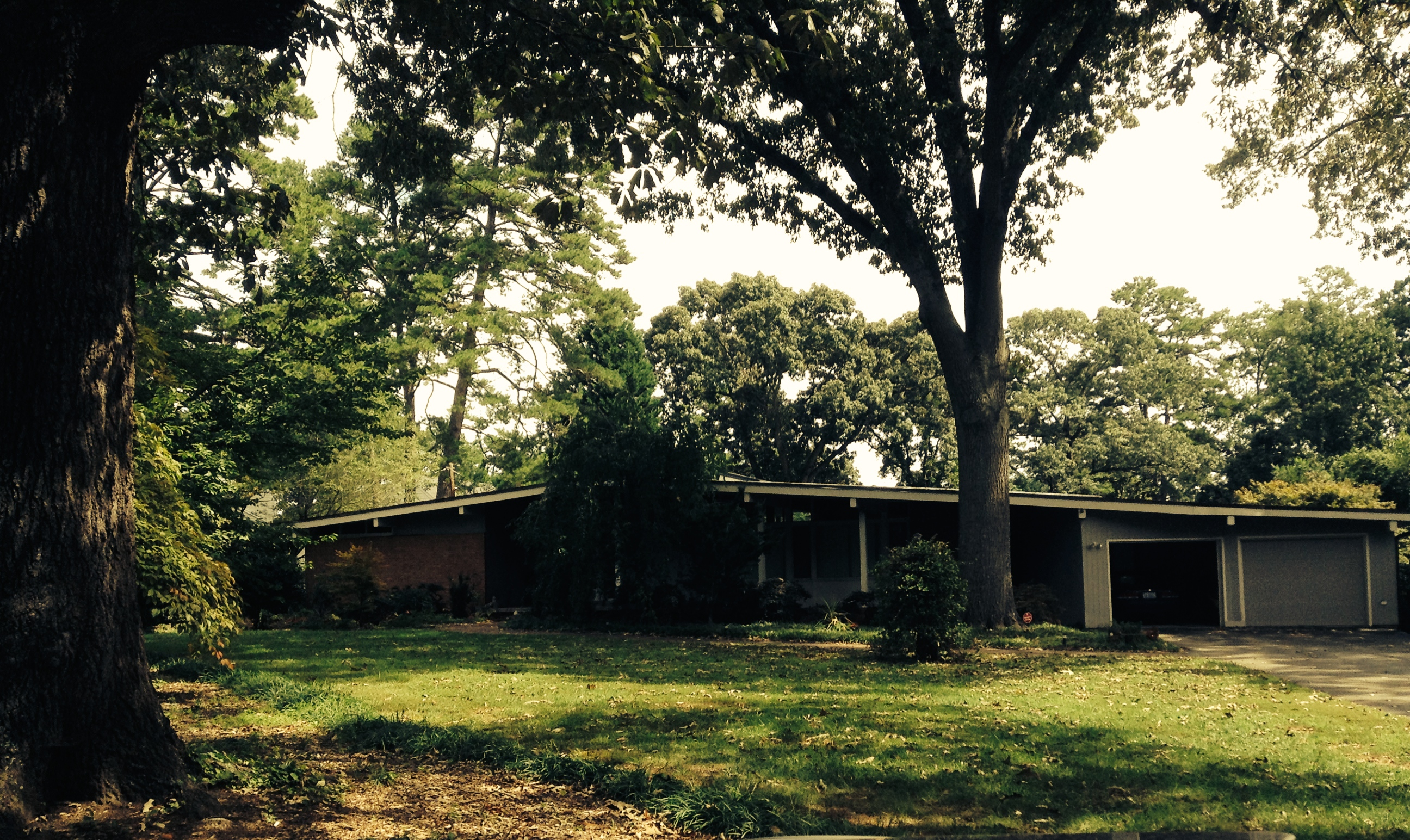
- The house in September 2014

- Location within North Carolina Location within the United States
- Location: 1428 Canterbury Road, Raleigh, North Carolina
- Coordinates: 35°48′27″N 78°40′10″W
- Area: 0.87 acres (0.35 ha)
- Built: 1960–1961
- Built by: Davidson Construction Company
- Architect: F. Carter Williams & Associates
- Architectural style: Modern Movement
- MPS: Post-World War II and Modern Architecture in Raleigh, North Carolina, 1945–1965
- NRHP reference No.: 11000892
- Added to NRHP: December 7, 2011

G. Dewey and Elma Arndt House is a historic Modernist residence in the Budleigh neighborhood of Raleigh, North Carolina. Designed by the architectural firm of F. Carter Williams & Associates and constructed between 1960 and 1961 for agricultural cooperative executive G. Dewey Arndt and his wife, Elma, the house is a notable example of postwar Modern Movement residential architecture in Raleigh. The residence employs a post-and-beam structural system and is carefully integrated into its sloping, wooded site, reflecting architectural principles that emphasized openness, natural light, and a close relationship between indoor and outdoor spaces.

The house was listed on the National Register of Historic Places on December 7, 2011, as part of the multiple property submission Post-World War II and Modern Architecture in Raleigh, North Carolina, 1945–1965, in recognition of its architectural significance as a well-preserved example of Modernist residential design.

== History ==
Garland Dewey Arndt (1901–1974) purchased the property that became 1428 Canterbury Road through two land acquisitions in 1944 and 1947, assembling a residential lot in the Budleigh Forest subdivision of west Raleigh. Platted in 1940, the neighborhood was developed with large wooded lots that reflected the city's postwar suburban expansion. Although several neighboring houses were constructed during the 1940s and early 1950s, Arndt left the property undeveloped for more than a decade while he continued to reside on Vanderbilt Avenue near Hillsborough Street with his first wife, Annie. Following Annie Arndt's death in 1958, Arndt married Elma E. Johnson. In April 1960, the Raleigh architectural firm of F. Carter Williams & Associates prepared plans for a new residence on the Canterbury Road property, and the couple moved into the completed house in 1961.

Arndt spent most of his career in North Carolina's agricultural cooperative system. Raised on a cotton farm in Catawba County, he attended college before leaving during the collapse of cotton prices following World War I. He subsequently worked for a series of agricultural organizations, including the North Carolina Cotton Growers Cooperative Association and the Farmers Cooperative Exchange, eventually serving as general manager of both organizations. His long association with the state's cotton industry influenced much of his professional life and made him a prominent figure in North Carolina agricultural marketing during the mid-twentieth century.

The Arndts commissioned the house during a period of increasing acceptance of Modernist residential architecture in Raleigh. Designed by F. Carter Williams & Associates and constructed by Davidson Construction Company between 1960 and 1961, the residence reflected the growing popularity of architect-designed Modern Movement houses among the city's professional and business leaders. The design was carefully adapted to its sloping, wooded site, characteristics that contributed to its later architectural significance.

The house was listed in the National Register of Historic Places on December 7, 2011, as part of the multiple property submission Post-World War II and Modern Architecture in Raleigh, North Carolina, 1945–1965, recognizing its significance as a well-preserved example of Modernist residential architecture in Raleigh.

== Architecture ==
The G. Dewey and Elma Arndt House is a Modern Movement residence situated on a sloping, wooded lot in Raleigh's Budleigh Forest neighborhood. Designed by the architectural firm of F. Carter Williams & Associates, the house employs a post-and-beam structural system that allows it to conform to the site's topography while emphasizing horizontal lines and open interior spaces. Because the ground falls away toward the rear of the property, the house presents a one-story appearance from the street while revealing a two-story rear elevation overlooking the wooded landscape.

The asymmetrical front-gable roof is the building's defining architectural feature. The broad, low-sloping roof projects beyond the exterior walls with deep overhanging eaves and shelters a recessed entrance porch supported by slender wood posts and exposed beams. The front façade is composed of three principal bays, with large areas of glazing and clerestory windows beneath the eaves that admit natural light while reinforcing the building's strong horizontal emphasis. Exterior materials include vertical wood siding above a low masonry foundation, a restrained palette characteristic of residential Modernist architecture of the period.

The rear elevation takes advantage of the site's steep grade through a two-level composition, with the upper story projecting above a brick-clad lower level. A large recessed porch dominates the upper floor, extending the principal living spaces into the surrounding landscape. Broad expanses of glass strengthen the visual connection between the interior and the wooded site, reflecting Modernist principles that emphasized natural light, openness, and the integration of architecture with its natural setting.

The interior was planned around an open living and dining area, with functional spaces arranged to maximize views and daylight while maintaining a clear separation between public and private rooms. Original finishes and built-in features remained largely intact at the time of the property's National Register nomination. Although the original carport was enclosed as living space in 1988 and a detached two-car garage and workshop were constructed in 2000, these alterations were determined not to diminish the architectural integrity of the residence, which continues to convey the design intent of F. Carter Williams & Associates and remains a well-preserved example of Raleigh's postwar Modernist residential architecture.
