= Grosvenor Gardens Apartments =

- U.S. National Register of Historic Places
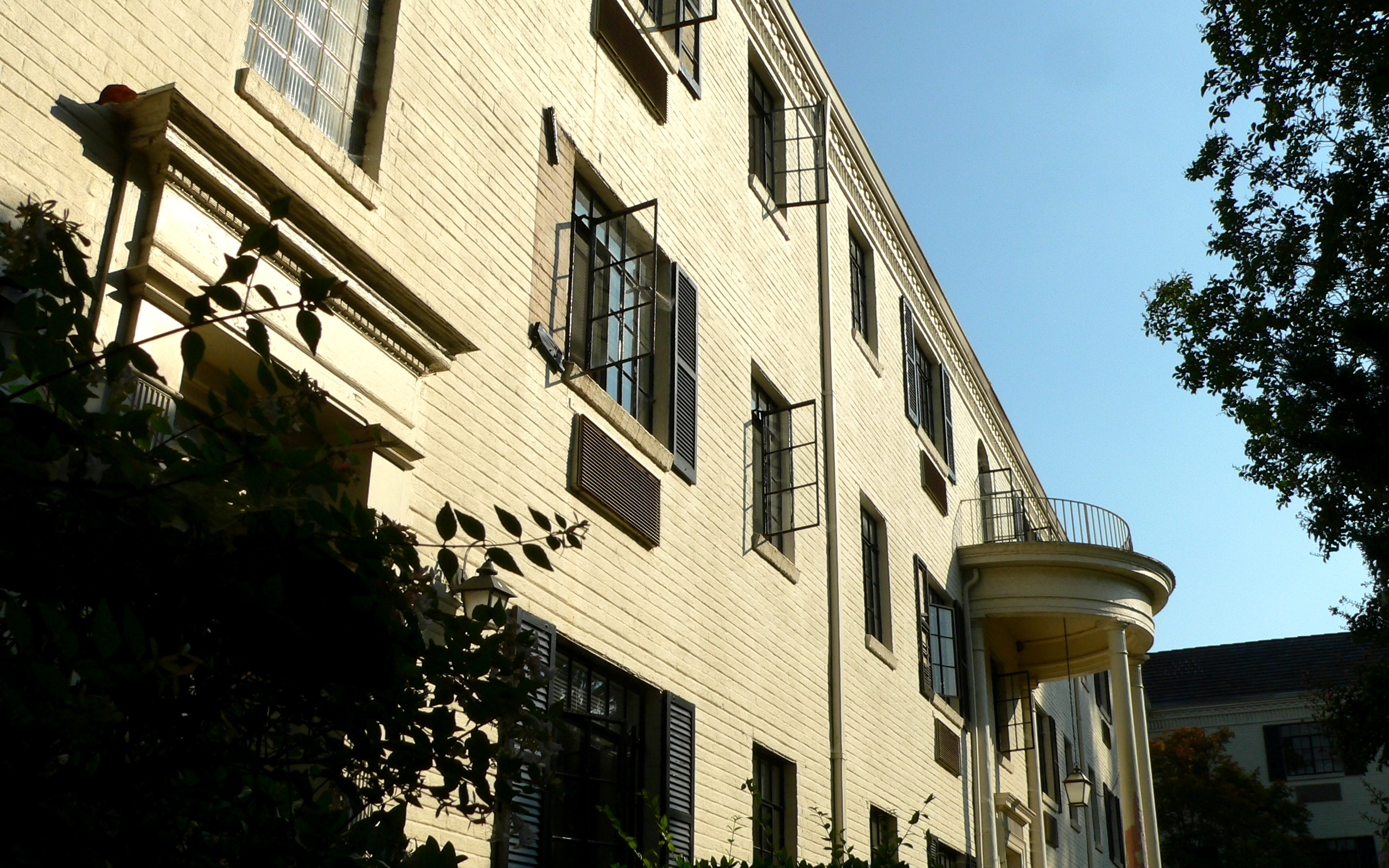
- Grosvenor Gardens, September 2014

- Location within North Carolina Location within the United States
- Location: 1101 Hillsborough St., Raleigh, North Carolina
- Coordinates: 35°46′53″N 78°39′18″W
- Area: 1.7 acres (0.69 ha)
- Built: 1939
- Built by: Coffey, J. W., and Son
- Architect: Edwards, James M., Jr.; Et al.
- Architectural style: Colonial Revival
- NRHP reference No.: 92001602
- Added to NRHP: November 12, 1992

Grosvenor Gardens Apartments is an historic apartment complex located at Raleigh, Wake County, North Carolina. The three-story, Colonial Revival style brick building was constructed in 1939 and consists of a “U” shape plan around an open landscaped courtyard. It is a pedimented gable-roofed structure with symmetrically arranged three- and five bay units, three of which feature two-story convex porticos facing the center courtyard. There are 58 studio apartments, one basement apartment with one bedroom, one two-bedroom apartment, one three-bedroom apartment, and a laundry room in the complex.

Owner-developer of the building, Sidney J. Wollman, named the building after Grosvenor Gardens in London. Descendants of the Wollman family owned the property until 2021.

It was listed on the National Register of Historic Places in 1992 and is a Raleigh Historic Landmark.
