= Raleigh Electric Company Power House =

Historic building in North Carolina, US

- U.S. National Register of Historic Places
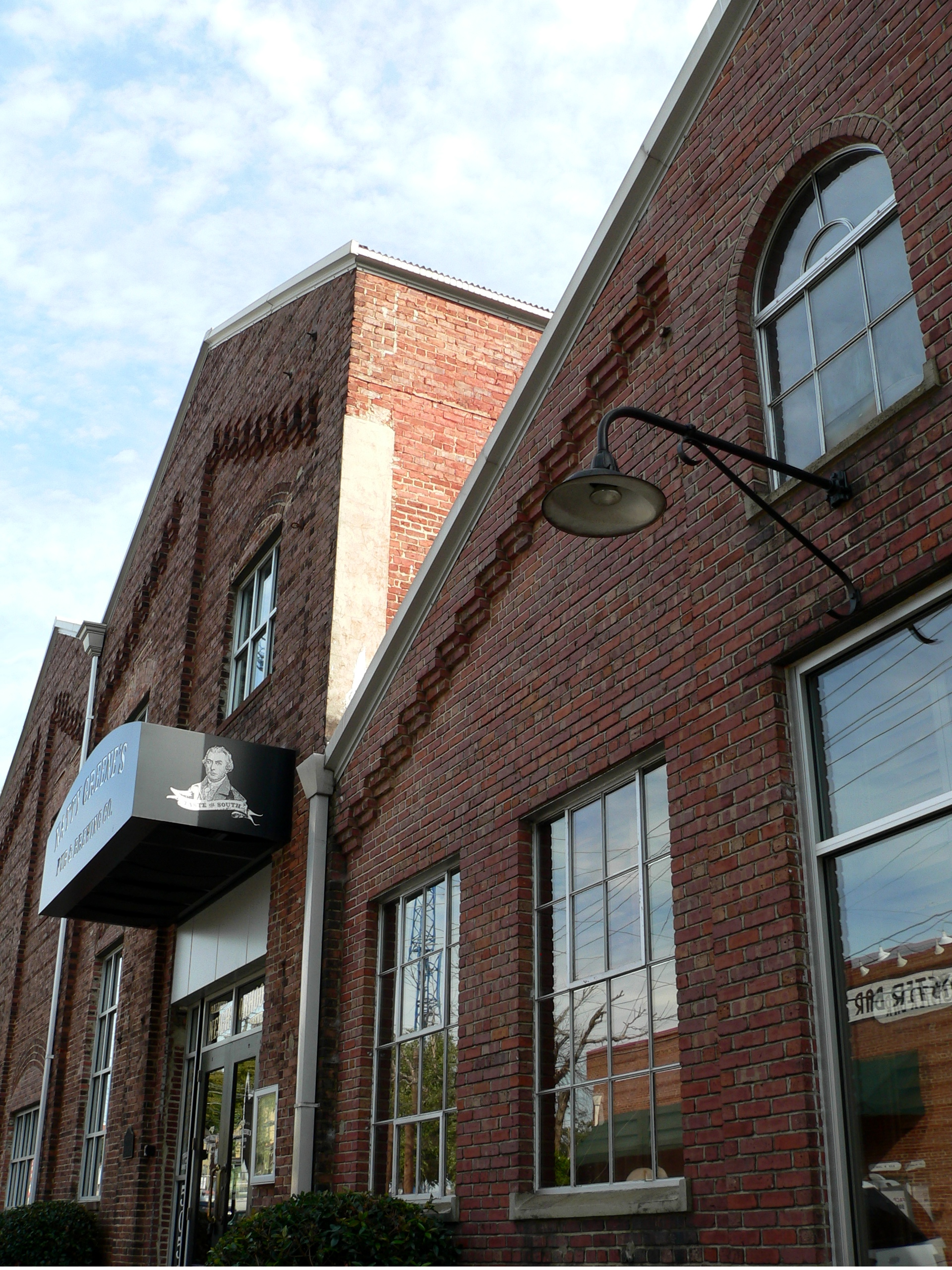
- Raleigh Electric Company Power House, September 2014

- Location within North Carolina Location within the United States
- Location: 513-515 W. Jones St., Raleigh, North Carolina
- Coordinates: 35°46′56″N 78°38′48″W
- Area: less than one acre
- Built: 1910
- Architectural style: heavy industrial
- NRHP reference No.: 97001305
- Added to NRHP: October 30, 1997

Raleigh Electric Company Power House, also known as the Carolina Power and Light Power House, is a historic power station located at Raleigh, North Carolina. It was built in 1910, and is a triparte, gable-front steel framed common bond brick building. It consists of two original two-story blocks and a one-story replacement block built in 1930. It was originally built to power Raleigh's electric street car system.

It was listed on the National Register of Historic Places in 1997.
