= Dr. Hubert Benbury Haywood House =

Historic house in North Carolina, United States

- U.S. National Register of Historic Places
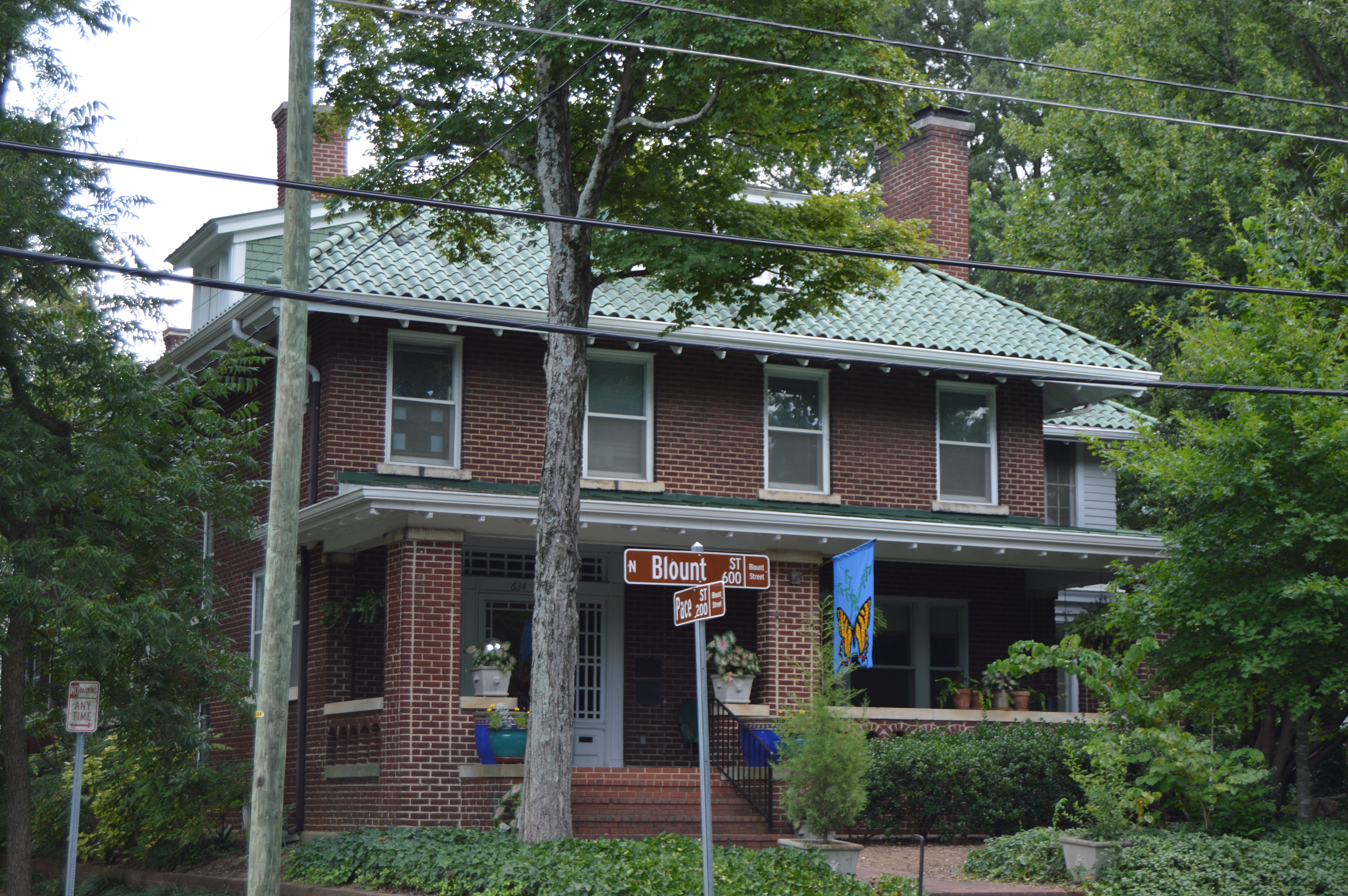
- Front and northern side

- Location within North Carolina Location within the United States
- Location: 634 N. Blount St., Raleigh, North Carolina
- Coordinates: 35°47′19″N 78°38′10″W
- Area: less than one acre
- Built: 1916, 1928
- Built by: Howard K. Satterfield
- Architectural style: Prairie School, Colonial Revival
- NRHP reference No.: 95001440
- Added to NRHP: December 13, 1995

Dr. Hubert Benbury Haywood House is a historic home located at Raleigh, Wake County, North Carolina. It was built in 1916, and is a two-story, Prairie School-style brick dwelling with a green tile hipped roof and two-bay wide, one-bay deep, one-story brick sun porch. A two-story rear ell was added in 1928. The interior has Colonial Revival style design elements.

It was listed on the National Register of Historic Places in 1995.
