= Bailey-Estes House =

Historic house in North Carolina, United States

- U.S. National Register of Historic Places
- Location within North Carolina Location within the United States
- Location: 9020 Mangum Dairy Rd., Wake Forest, North Carolina
- Coordinates: 36°02′08″N 78°36′09″W
- Area: 19.27 acres (7.80 ha)
- Built: c. 1864, c. 1880
- Architectural style: I-House
- MPS: Historic and Architectural Resources of Wake County, North Carolina
- NRHP reference No.: 10001097
- Added to NRHP: December 28, 2010

Bailey-Estes House is a historic home located at Wake Forest, Wake County, North Carolina. It was built about 1864, and is a two-story, frame I-house, with a 1 1/2-story rear kitchen ell added about 1880. It has a side gable roof and three single-shoulder, stuccoed stone chimneys. Also on the property is a contributing family cemetery.

It was listed on the National Register of Historic Places in 2010.
