= Pine Hall (Raleigh, North Carolina) =

Historic house in North Carolina, United States

- U.S. National Register of Historic Places
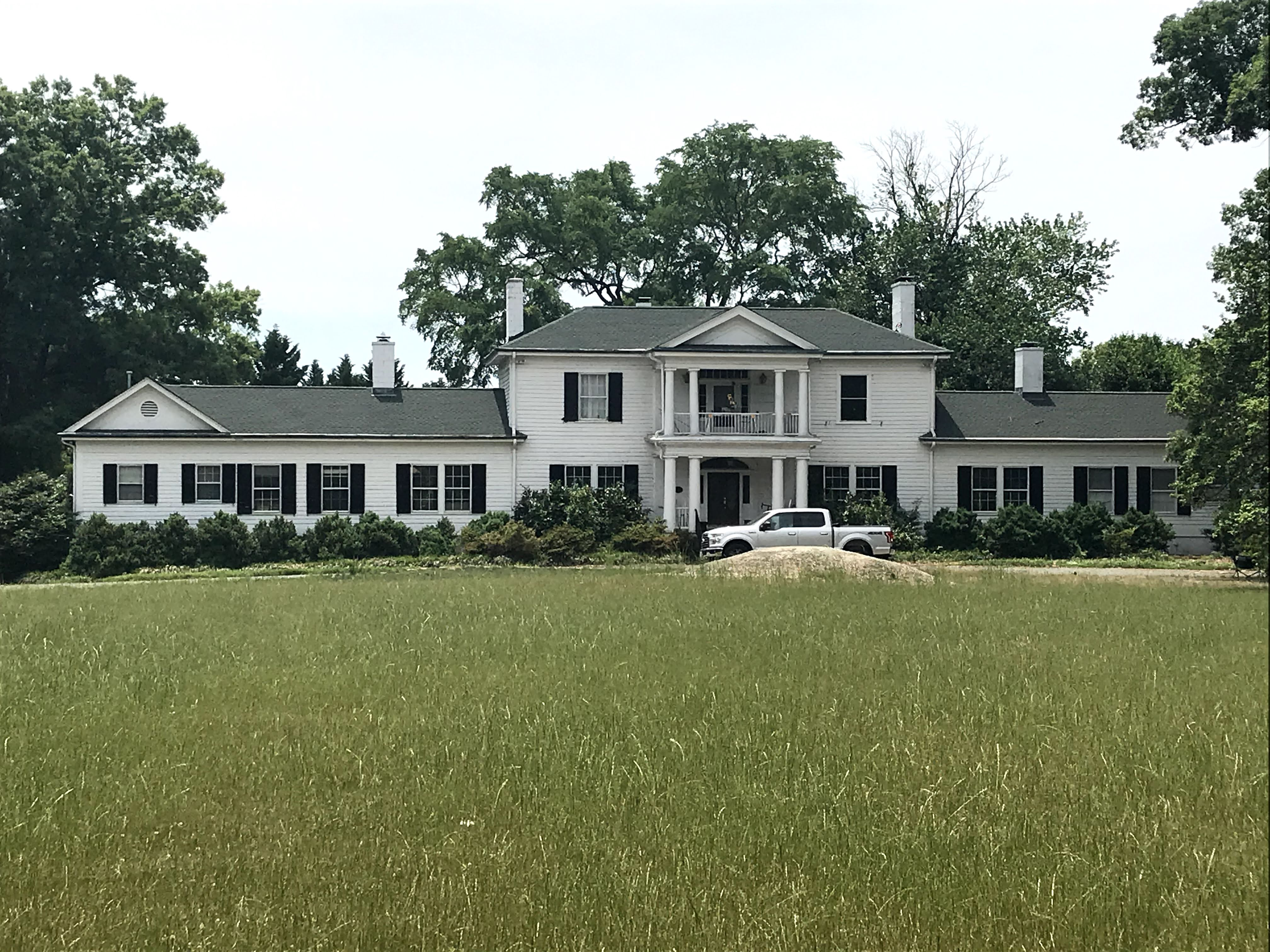

- Location within North Carolina Location within the United States
- Location: 5300 Castlebrook Dr., Raleigh, North Carolina
- Coordinates: 35°49′18″N 78°32′59″W
- Area: 5.2 acres (2.1 ha)
- Built: c. 1841, 1940-1941
- Architectural style: Colonial Revival
- MPS: Wake County MPS
- NRHP reference No.: 06000789
- Added to NRHP: September 6, 2006

Pine Hall, also known as the Jeremiah Dunn House and Julian Gregory House, is a historic home located at Raleigh, Wake County, North Carolina. It was built about 1841, and enlarged and remodeled in 1940–1941 in the Colonial Revival style. The original core is a two-story, frame I-house with a hipped roof over a raised basement. It features a two-story pedimented portico with massive Doric order columns. Identical side-gable, single-pile, one-story wings were added with the 1940-1941 renovation. Also on the property is a contributing garage (c. 1940–1941).

It was listed on the National Register of Historic Places in 2006.
