= Dr. Lawrence Branch Young House =

Historic house in North Carolina, United States

- U.S. National Register of Historic Places
- Location within North Carolina Location within the United States
- Location: 119 W. Young St., Rolesville, North Carolina
- Coordinates: 35°55′29″N 78°27′28″W
- Area: 2.2 acres (0.89 ha)
- Built: 1903
- Architectural style: Queen Anne, Colonial Revival
- MPS: Wake County MPS
- NRHP reference No.: 03000966
- Added to NRHP: September 25, 2003

The Dr. Lawrence Branch Young House is a historic home located in Rolesville, North Carolina, a satellite town of the state capital Raleigh. Built in 1903, the Young house is the only example of Queen Anne and Colonial Revival architecture in Rolesville. The two-story white house features a wraparound porch, tall brick chimneys, and steep pyramidal roofs.

In September 2003, the Dr. Lawrence Branch Young House was listed on the National Register of Historic Places.

== See also ==
- List of Registered Historic Places in North Carolina
