= Jesse Penny House and Outbuildings =

Historic house in North Carolina, United States

- U.S. National Register of Historic Places
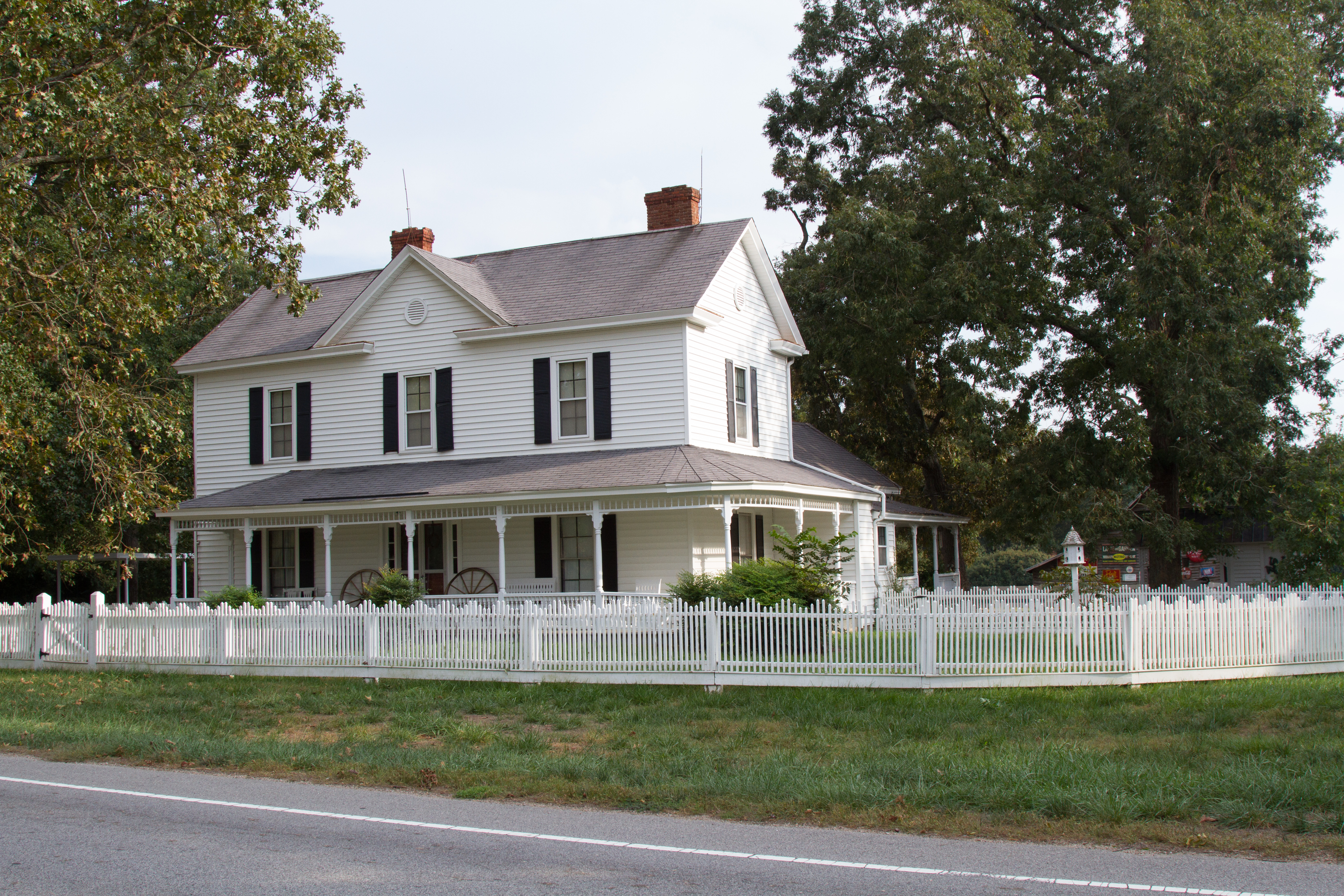
- Jesse Penny House, September 2012

- Location within North Carolina Location within the United States
- Location: NC 1379, 1 mi. SW of NC 1371, Raleigh, North Carolina
- Coordinates: 35°42′40″N 78°42′6″W
- Area: 5.5 acres (2.2 ha)
- Architectural style: Triple-A I House
- NRHP reference No.: 02000165
- Added to NRHP: March 13, 2002

Jesse Penny House and Outbuildings is a historic home and farm complex located near Raleigh, Wake County, North Carolina. The Penny House was built in 1890, and enlarged in 1900. It is a two-story, single pile, frame I-house with a one-story rear addition. It features a hip-roofed wraparound porch. Also on the property are the contributing well house (c. 1900), barn/garage (c. 1900), barn (c. 1900), chicken house (c. 1900), and picket fence (c. 1900).

It was listed on the National Register of Historic Places in 2002.
