= Raleigh Banking and Trust Company Building =

Historic building in North Carolina, US

- U.S. National Register of Historic Places
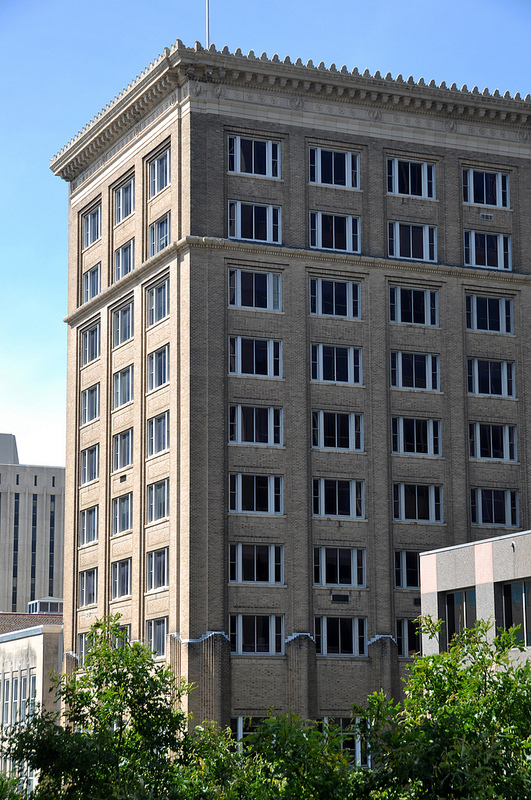
- Raleigh Banking and Trust Company Building, September 2013

- Location within North Carolina Location within the United States
- Location: 5 W. Hargett St., Raleigh, North Carolina
- Coordinates: 35°46′39″N 78°38′23″W
- Area: less than one acre
- Built: 1913, 1928-1929, 1935-1936
- Built by: Hudson, John W. et al.
- Architect: Underwood, H.A.
- Architectural style: Classical Revival, Moderne
- NRHP reference No.: 93000543
- Added to NRHP: June 17, 1993

Raleigh Banking and Trust Company Building, also known as the Raleigh Building, is a historic bank office building located at Raleigh, North Carolina, United States. It is an eleven-story, seven bays wide and three bays deep, Classical Revival style skyscraper. It is a steel frame and brick veneer building with white terra cotta ornamental elements. The first three stories were built in 1913, with the upper eight stories added in 1928–1929. The first three floors were radically renovated in 1935–1936, with the addition of Art Moderne design elements.

It was listed on the National Register of Historic Places in 1993.
