= Perry Farm =

Historic farm in North Carolina, United States

- U.S. National Register of Historic Places
- Location within North Carolina Location within the United States
- Location: NC 2320 south side, east of the junction with NC 2300, Riley Hill, North Carolina
- Coordinates: 35°51′7″N 78°24′09″W
- Area: 10 acres (4.0 ha)
- Built: 1820
- MPS: Wake County MPS
- NRHP reference No.: 94001025
- Added to NRHP: August 26, 1994

The Perry Farm is an intact, historic African-American farm complex in Riley Hill, North Carolina, a suburb of Raleigh. The farm house was built in 1820 by John and Nancy Perry, white slaveholders of several slaves during the Antebellum period of the South.

After the Civil War ended, a freedman named Feggins Perry made arrangements with his former enslavers to work the land as a tenant farmer. Each night after work, Feggins made baskets and furniture for extra money so he and his brother could buy land, which was the prime goal of many freedmen. Feggins Perry also helped establish the nearby Riley Hill Baptist Church for freedmen.

In 1914, Feggins' son Guyon Perry purchased Perry Farm. The property remains in the family to this day.

Perry Farm was listed on the National Register of Historic Places in August 1994 as significant in African-American social history.

== See also ==
- List of Registered Historic Places in North Carolina
