= John T. and Mary Turner House =

Historic house in North Carolina, United States

- U.S. National Register of Historic Places
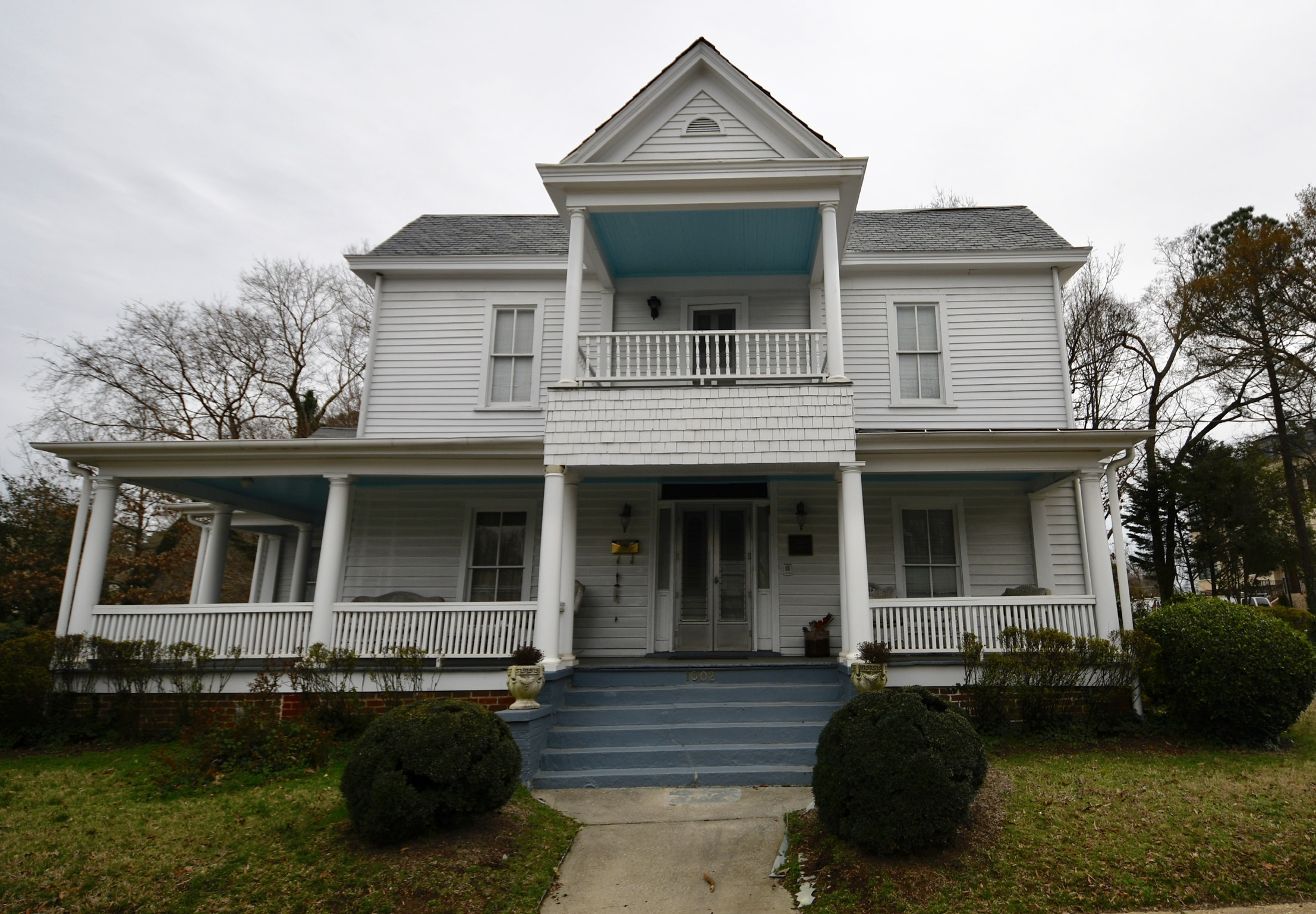

- Location within North Carolina Location within the United States
- Location: 1002 Oberlin Rd. Raleigh, North Carolina
- Coordinates: 35°47′52″N 78°39′37″W
- Area: 0.7 acres (0.28 ha)
- Built: 1889
- Architectural style: Queen Anne, Colonial Revival
- MPS: Oberlin, North Carolina MPS
- NRHP reference No.: 02000499
- Added to NRHP: May 16, 2002

John T and Mary Turner House is a historic home located at Raleigh, Wake County, North Carolina. It was built about 1889, and is a two-story, side gable I-house with one-story sections at its rear. It incorporates Queen Anne and Colonial Revival-style design elements. It was constructed by John T. Turner, an African-American entrepreneur.

It was listed on the National Register of Historic Places in 2002.
