= Riley Hill, North Carolina =

Unincorporated community in North Carolina, US

Coordinates: 35°51′32″N 78°25′12″W

Riley Hill, North Carolina, United States, is an unincorporated community in mideastern Wake County. It is at the southern end of Broughton Road, on Riley Hill Road and is approximately six miles northeast of Knightdale, and approximately 3.8 miles north of the intersection of U.S. 64/264, and Business U.S. 64.

Perry Farm, listed on the National Register of Historic Places, is located in Riley Hill. The Riley Hill Elementary School was badly damaged after fire in September 2020.
