= Professional Building (Raleigh, North Carolina) =

- U.S. National Register of Historic Places
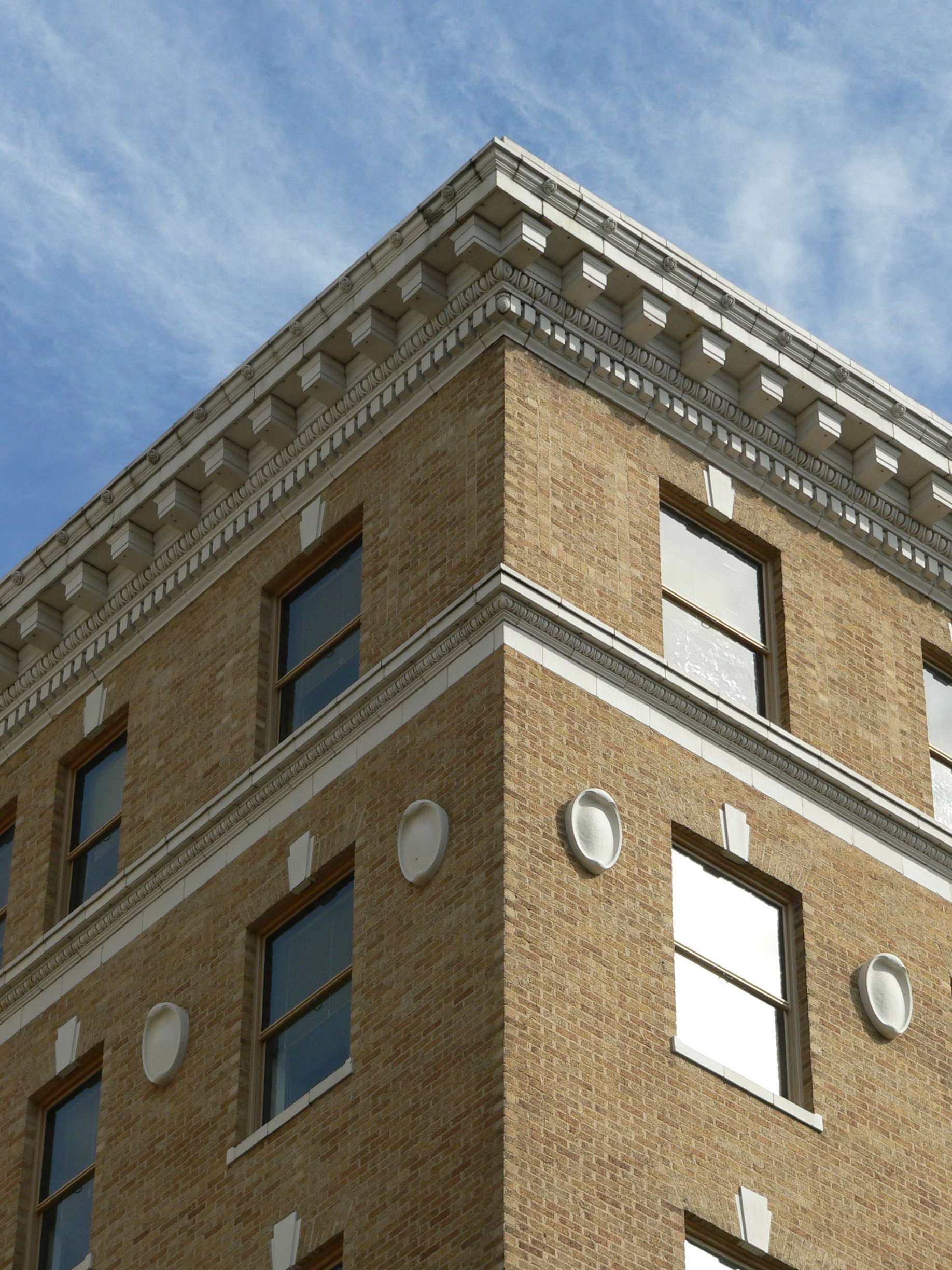
- Professional Building, September 2014

- Location within North Carolina Location within the United States
- Location: 123-127 W. Hargett and McDowell Sts., Raleigh, North Carolina
- Coordinates: 35°46′42″N 78°38′28″W
- Area: 0.2 acres (0.081 ha)
- Built: 1925
- Built by: J. E. Beaman
- Architect: Milburn, Heister & Company
- Architectural style: Chicago, Neo-Classical
- NRHP reference No.: 83001925
- Added to NRHP: September 8, 1983

The Professional Building is a historic office building located at Raleigh, North Carolina. It was designed by Yancey Milburn of the architectural firm Milburn, Heister & Company and built in 1925. It is an eight-story, steel frame and yellow brick veneer Classical Revival-style skyscraper with Beaux Arts-style terra cotta ornamental elements. It consists of a two-story "base", five-story "shaft" and one-story "capital" in the Chicago style.

It was listed on the National Register of Historic Places in 1983.
