= Norburn Terrace =

Historic house in North Carolina, United States

- U.S. National Register of Historic Places
- Location within North Carolina Location within the United States
- Location: 216 Lafayette St., Raleigh, North Carolina
- Coordinates: 35°47′38″N 78°37′47″W
- Area: 1.3 acres (0.53 ha)
- Built: 1898
- Architect: Bauer, A.G.
- Architectural style: Late Victorian
- NRHP reference No.: 80002902
- Added to NRHP: February 1, 1980

Norburn Terrace is a historic home located at Raleigh, Wake County, North Carolina. It was built about 1898, and is a two-story, three-bay, T-shaped, Late Victorian-style brick dwelling. It features an octagonal tower with a spire roof and decorative porch with a spindle frieze and turned balusters. It was the home of Herbert E. Norris, a prominent Wake County attorney and politician.

It was listed on the National Register of Historic Places in 1980.
