= Church of the Good Shepherd (Raleigh, North Carolina) =

Church in Raleigh, North Carolina, US

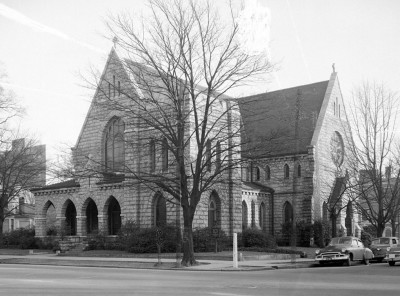
- Church-of-the-Good-Shepherd Raleigh-400x296
- Church of the Good Shepherd
- 35°46′49″N 78°38′29″W
- Location: 121 Hillsborough St, Raleigh, North Carolina United States of America
- Denomination: Episcopal
- Website: www.cgs-raleigh.org

History
- Status: Active Parish
- Founded: 1874

Architecture
- Architect(s): Robert W. Gibson; Charles E. Hartge
- Architectural type: Gothic Revival
- Groundbreaking: 1899
- Completed: 1914

Administration
- Diocese: Episcopal Diocese of North Carolina

Clergy
- Rector: Imogen Rhodenhiser
- Church of the Good Shepherd
- U.S. Historic district – Contributing property
- Built: 1914
- Part of: Capitol Area Historic District (ID78001978)
- Added to NRHP: April 15, 1978

The Church of the Good Shepherd is a historic Episcopal church in downtown Raleigh, North Carolina. The congregation branched off of Christ Episcopal Church in 1874, making it the second oldest Episcopal parish in Raleigh. It is part of the Episcopal Diocese of North Carolina and served as the Pro-cathedral church of the diocese in the mid-1890s.

The congregation's original building was completed in 1875 and served the parish until a larger stone building was proven necessary. The cornerstone of the current building was laid in 1899, and the first service in the new space was held on Easter Day of 1914. The parish's current sanctuary was added to the U.S. National Register of Historic Places as a contributing property of the Capitol Area Historic District in 1978.

== History ==
=== Foundation ===
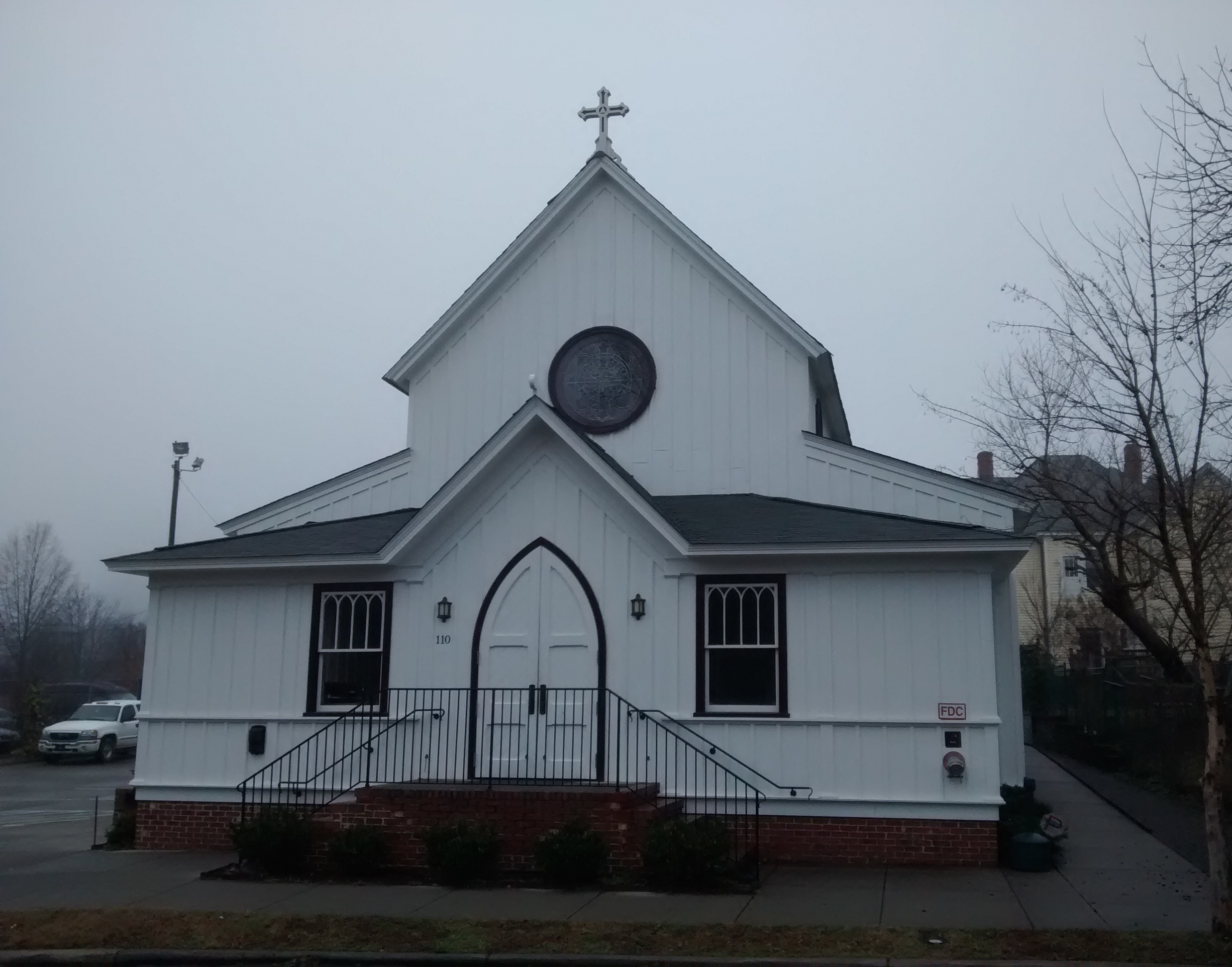
All Saint's Chapel, the first building constructed to house the parish

The parish was founded after a schism within Raleigh's first Episcopal church, Christ Church, making the Good Shepherd the second Episcopal parish in the capital city. The split occurred following a disagreement between a large number of parishioners at Christ Church over the ethics of pew rentals, a practice in which families bought the right to sit in pews for a number of years or for life. This difference of opinion created tension throughout the 1870s as the more vocal group of church members, who would later break away from the parish, argued that the rental policy relegated Raleigh's poorer residents to a form of second-class citizenship, as they were commonly forced to the back of the church or to the balconies. Eventually this disagreement came to a head, and in 1873 the Reverend Edward R. Rich of St. Paul's Church in Clinton, North Carolina, suggested that a new Episcopal church in Raleigh be created. In the first days of 1874, Christ Church officially split with the consent of all parties involved and the bishop, and the new group of congregants announced the formation of the Church of the Good Shepherd.

In January 1874, the Rev. Edward R. Rich was called as rector of the newly-formed church. Born in Baltimore, Rev. Rich served as a soldier during the Civil War before becoming a deacon in Maryland in 1870, and later joining the priesthood in 1873. Ordained in the eastern part of North Carolina, he served as the rector of St. Paul's in Clinton for roughly a year, during which time he assisted the future congregants of Good Shepherd in establishing their new parish. He conducted the first service on February 15, 1874, assisted by the Rt. Rev. Theodore B. Lyman, D.D. in the historic Tucker Hall on Fayetteville Street. By the spring of that year, a site at the corner of Hillsborough and McDowell streets was purchased, and construction of the first church building began on September 24, 1874. Services were often held in Tucker Hall and in the House chambers of the North Carolina State Capitol building while the first church building was being built. On Easter Day, March 28, 1875, the congregation held its first service at the church's new location in the building designed by Johannes Adam Simon Oertel, now referred to as All Saints Chapel. The new parish was admitted to the Diocese at its annual convention, held in Wilmington on May 21, 1874.

=== Call for a New Building and Pro-cathedral Designation ===
By the 1890s, it had already become clear that the congregation had outgrown its original home, and was in need of a new building to accommodate its members. Without a permanent rector after the departure of the parish's third priest early in the year, the bishop of the diocese invited The Rev. Dr. Isaac McKendree Pittenger, D. D. from Long Island to visit Raleigh for the winter and conduct pastoral care work. In the spring of 1891, he was invited by the congregation to serve as the fourth rector of the church and accepted shortly thereafter. Rev. Pittenger quickly became an outspoken supporter of the call for the construction of a new sanctuary, envisioning a massive stone building that would stand above the growing city. However many within the parish felt that it was in the better interest of the congregation to wait until the parish acquired more of the necessary funds, as much of the region was still experiencing Reconstruction era financial hardships. In 1893, the Rt. Rev. Joseph Blount Cheshire became the fifth Bishop of the Diocese of North Carolina, and began frequenting the church upon moving to Raleigh. The Bishop supported Rev. Pittenger's vision of the new building and hoped that the parish could serve as the cathedral of the diocese upon the building's completion. On September 23, 1894, Bishop Cheshire declared the Church of the Good Shepherd the Pro-cathedral of the diocese and named Rev. Pittenger the dean of the new cathedral. However, it is believed that at the diocesan convention, the Bishop was not able to garner enough support from the delegates to name Good Shepherd as the permanent cathedral, and the church therefore abandoned the Pro-cathedral title by late 1895. Despite this setback, the congregation was still committed to constructing the new building and funds began to be set aside for its construction. In 1896, Rev. Pittenger made a pilgrimage to the Holy Land where he chose a block of marble quarried near Jerusalem to serve as the cornerstone for a new and larger church building in Raleigh. On March 8, 1897, the parish's vestry moved to solidify plans to construct a new building, which at the time was to serve as a memorial to the recently deceased Bishop Lyman.

=== Construction of current building and facilities ===
The cornerstone was laid on All Saints' Day, November 1, 1899, to a crowd of church members, government officials and academic presidents. The design for the building was first created by New York architect Robert W. Gibson from the plans of Rev. Pittenger, and construction was overseen by Raleigh architect Charles E. Hartge beginning in 1904. The first services in the new structure were held on May 17, 1914, Easter Day, with the evening Confirmation service seeing a congregation of over a thousand. Constructed of North Carolina and New Hampshire granite with a roof of native pine, at the time of its completion, it was one of the largest churches in state and was described as being "One of the handsomest in North Carolina" by The News & Observer. The original church building was moved to a different portion of the parish lot and became the new Parish House, where it was used for that purpose until 1954 when a new Parish House building was completed, and the original church structure was re-designated as All Saints Chapel. While the construction on the existing church structure was completed in 1914, the construction of the stained glass windows took place over the next 60 years. The altar depicting The Last Supper and the wainscoting and paving inside the altar rail are made from Italian marble and are typical of churches in Northern Italy. Most of the work on the altar was done in Italy and the Italian masons traveled to North Carolina to install it. Over the years, several buildings were constructed on the church's property to house parish activities including classrooms, choir rooms, and offices. In 2006, All Saints Chapel was sold to Empire Properties, and all other buildings were demolished to provide additional space for a new Parish Life Center, which was completed in 2004. The chapel was transported roughly half a mile to its current location along Raleigh's East Street, just west of the Historic Oakwood neighborhood. The current Parish Life Center is a four-story building architecturally designed to match the church itself. It houses offices, classrooms, a new chapel, and a large hall which can hold around 300 people.

=== Notable Outreach Efforts ===
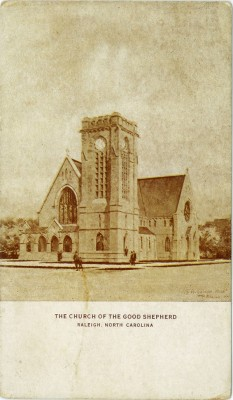
Original design for the church including the massive corner tower. The tower was never constructed.

==== St. John's Guild and Rex Hospital ====
Just a few years after the church had organized, the Rev. Edward Robbins Rich, the parish's first rector, felt that Raleigh was in need of a religious organization that could help establish opportunities for public education, encourage the expansion of music, and promote the health of the community. On October 31, 1877, roughly 40 men from the church and the community responded to a call from the rector and organized the St. John's Guild. The guild would eventually grow to include many of the region's Episcopal priests, and any man over the age of 15 was eligible to join, though women could also join as contributing members. In its early years, the guild was driven by Rev. Rich and Richard H. Battle, an attorney and chartered member of the church, who was also the son of state Supreme Court Justice William Horn Battle. With Battle's influence, the guild began to include many high-profile lawyers and doctors, including Dr. Peter Evan Hines who was the state's Surgeon General. On December 12, 1877, the guild opened the city's first public library, located in the Holleman Building on Fayetteville Street, which was free and open to the public six days a week. The library closed just a few years later in 1880 due to a lack of funding. In 1878, the guild embarked on its far more prosperous campaign, the establishment of St. Johns Hospital. At the time plans for the hospital were being debated, Raleigh had no public hospital, and the sick had to rely on private doctors and medics. At the urging of Battle and Hines, the guild rented a house on South Wilmington Street to serve as the first home of the hospital while funds were being acquired for a more permanent building. The hospital took in the sick and needy and charitably cared for them using the guild's own money to do so. In 1880, the guild defended its practice of admitting dying black men to the hospital at a time when segregation was rampant in the Reconstruction-era South. On March 31, 1882, the guild purchased the former home of Governor Charles Manly from E.J. Hardin, a local grocer, for $3,750, in the location bordered by Lenoir Street to the north, South Street to the south, Salisbury Street to the west, and Fayetteville Street to the east. The hospital continued to grow through the 1880s and 1890s, increasing both the number of patients it could house, and the size of its workforce. Following the death of John Rex, a wealthy Raleigh tanner, a trust was opened in his name for the establishment of a hospital in the Raleigh area. Recognizing the difficulty of opening a new hospital, the trustees approached the guild with the proposition of purchasing the hospital. In July 1893 after much negotiation, the guild agreed to sell St. John's Hospital to the trustees, and after acquiring financial assistance from the city, Rex Hospital opened in May 1894. The hospital has since grown into one of the state's largest and is composed of several different facilities.

==== Shepherd's Table Soup Kitchen ====
In 1979, congregants of the parish discussed the issue of homelessness in Raleigh which had significantly surged in the city throughout the 1970s. At the time there were few hospice houses or shelters open in the area, and city officials had approved the destruction of boarding houses and low-cost motels in order to gentrify downtown low-income neighborhoods. In the early 1980, the parish vestry passed a motion to approve a $3,000 grant for a soup kitchen on a trial basis. The Shepherd's Table Soup Kitchen was opened in April 1980 and within the first 14 days, 473 people had been fed. Throughout the early 1980s the kitchen fed around a thousand individuals a month, primarily with food donated by individuals and nearby restaurants. Up until 1984 the soup kitchen was run solely by the congregation and operated on donations alone, when the scope of the operation became unmanageable at an internal level. Shepherd's Table was transitioned to a 501(c)(3) organization, with church members continuing to volunteer and make up the 15-member board of directors. The newly incorporated kitchen became a joint venture operation with several other local churches, staffed primarily by volunteers. When a new parish life center was constructed for Good Shepherd in 2004, the entire ground floor was devoted to housing the Shepherd's Table, complete with an industrial kitchen and a full dining room. Today the kitchen serves over 300 meals a day from Monday through Friday, and has a rotating staff of around several hundred volunteers.

=== Rectors ===
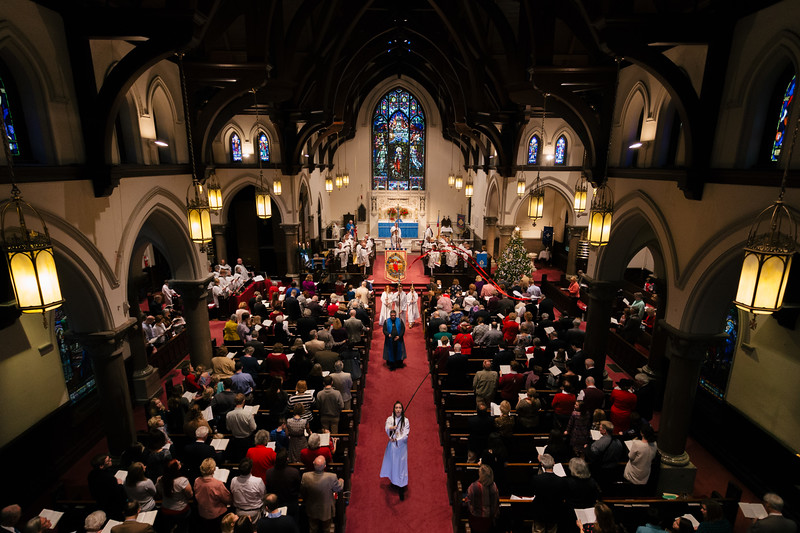
Sanctuary of the church during an Advent service.

Name	Years
Edward Robbins Rich	1874–1885
Robert Strange, D.D.	1885–1887
William Meade Clark	1887–1890
Issac McKendree Pittender, D.D.	1891–1916
Charles Aylette Ashby	1917–1922
Henry Gardner Lane	1922–1930
Theodore Partrick Jr.	1930–1935
James McDowell Dick, D.D.	1935–1964
Louis Chester Melcher Jr.	1964–1991
C. Perry Scruggs	1992–1993
Robert C. Sawyer	1996–2018
Imogen Rhodenheiser	2019–present

== Worship ==
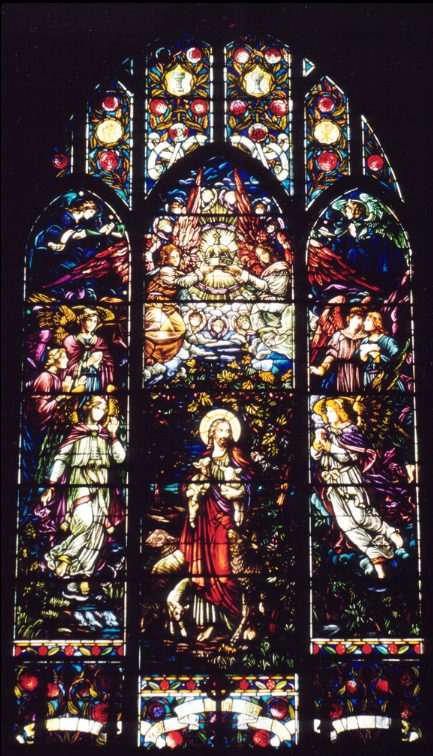
The Good Shepherd Window which sits above the altar.

=== Services and Liturgy ===
Like most Episcopal Churches in the United States, Good Shepherd uses the 1979 Book of Common Prayer and the 1982 Hymnal. The church holds three services in a typical week, two Sunday services and a Wednesday service:

- Early Morning Sunday Service: Uses Rite One of the Book of Common Prayer. A quiet and meditative service that uses more traditional language and emphasizes individual prayer.
- Late Morning Sunday Service: Uses Rite Two of the Book of Common Prayer. A lively and musical service that utilizes a full choir, hymns, and acolytes and additional lay positions.
- Wednesday Midday Service: Uses the Healing Rite from the Book of Common Prayer. A peaceful and inviting worship service that encourages all people from inside and outside of the congregation to participate.

The church also follows the Liturgical Calendar set forth in Book of Common Prayer, celebrating the principal feasts of the year, as well as the liturgical seasons (Advent, Christmas, Epiphany, Lent, Easter, Pentecost, and Ordinary Time). Special services are held throughout the year for holidays and special occasions. Readings and Gospel passages follow the three-year calendar also set forth in the Book of Common Prayer, with each day of the year having a unique Old Testament reading, Epistle reading, and Gospel reading. Almost all services throughout the year contain a Eucharist which involves the blessing and consumption of sacramental bread and the wine. The church also includes many lay positions in worship, such as acolytes, vergers, chalicists, lectors, and a congregational choir.

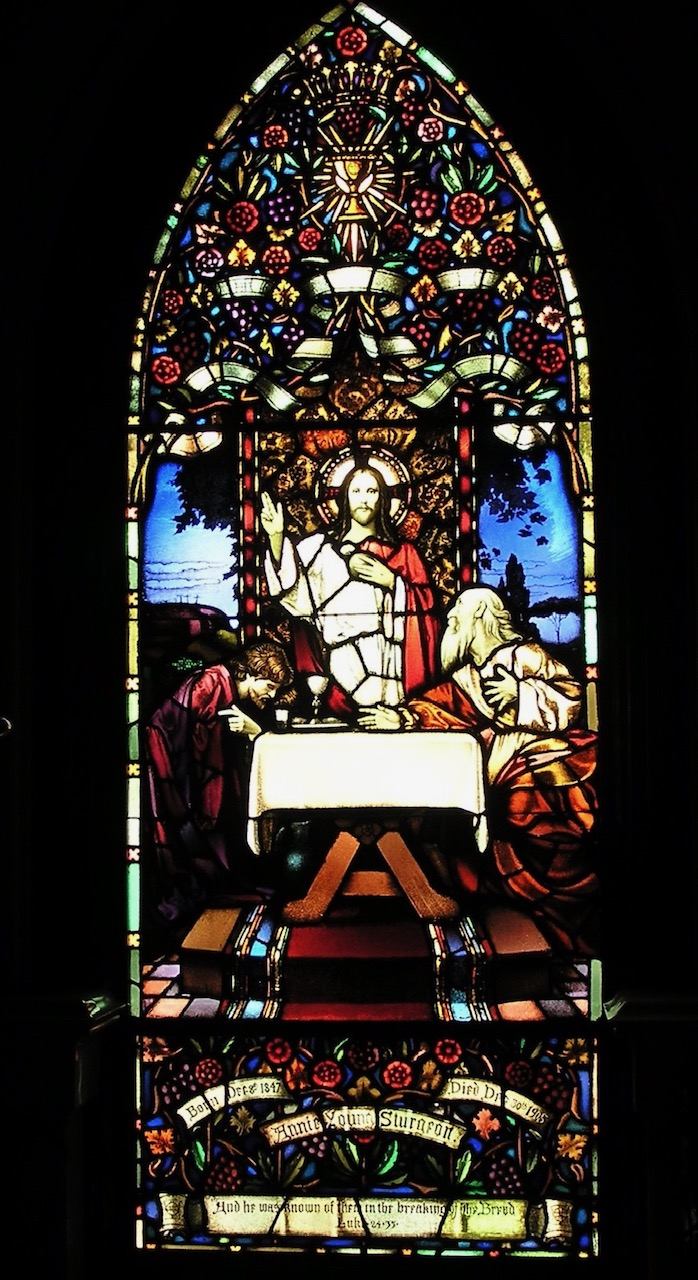
Stained glass window depicting Christ and a Eucharist feast.

=== Stained Glass Windows ===
The church holds over 70 stained glass windows and transoms that were placed between 1914 and the mid-1970s. The windows feature a number of similar but distinct art styles as a number of different firms were brought in to design the pieces, including the historic J&R Lamb Studios. The upper collection of the windows show figures from both the Old and New Testaments, including the Apostles, the Prophets, and a variety of other significant persons. The lower collection of windows feature important moments from the life of Christ in chronological order, beginning with the Annunciation and ending with the Ascension. The east and west transepts each contain a large rose window. All the windows are photographed in the 1998 book "A Vision Realized - Stories in Stained Glass of the Episcopal Church of the Good Shepherd".

=== Organ ===
The parish has utilized three pipe organs throughout its history, one which resided in the parish's original building, now called All Saints Chapel, and two which have resided in the new building within an enclave across from the Baptistry. Of the two that have sat in the parish's current home, the first was built by M. P. Möller in 1914 of oak paneling and tin pipes, and contained two manuals, twenty-two ranks, twenty stops, and 1,514 pipes. The organ was partially renovated in 1949 and removed prior to the installation of the building's current organ in 1982. This organ was built by the Quebec based organ manufacturer Casavant Frères in the same style of its predecessor and includes two manuals, twenty-seven ranks, twenty-one stops, and 1,346 pipes.

=== Programs and Parish Activities ===
The parish conducts a wide variety of Christian Formation activities including educational programming for children, youth, and adults on Sunday mornings from Fall through Spring, as well as weekly Bible studies which are traditionally held on weekdays. The church also has an active youth program that meets weekly, and frequent children's events. Supper clubs are another staple of the congregation, with various groups for young families, various guilds, and the LGBTQ community. The church has many yearly events and traditions for holidays, significant days throughout the church year, and for other occasions, such as the Children's Christmas Pageant and the All Parish Dinner.

== See also ==
- Episcopal Diocese of North Carolina
- Episcopal Church (United States)
- All Saints Chapel
- The Rt. Rev. Theodore B. Lyman
- The Rt. Rev. Joseph Blount Cheshire
- The Rt. Rev. Robert Strange
- Church Architecture
- Gothic Architecture
- Rex Hospital
