= Capitol Area Historic District =

Historic district in North Carolina, United States

- U.S. National Register of Historic Places
- U.S. Historic district
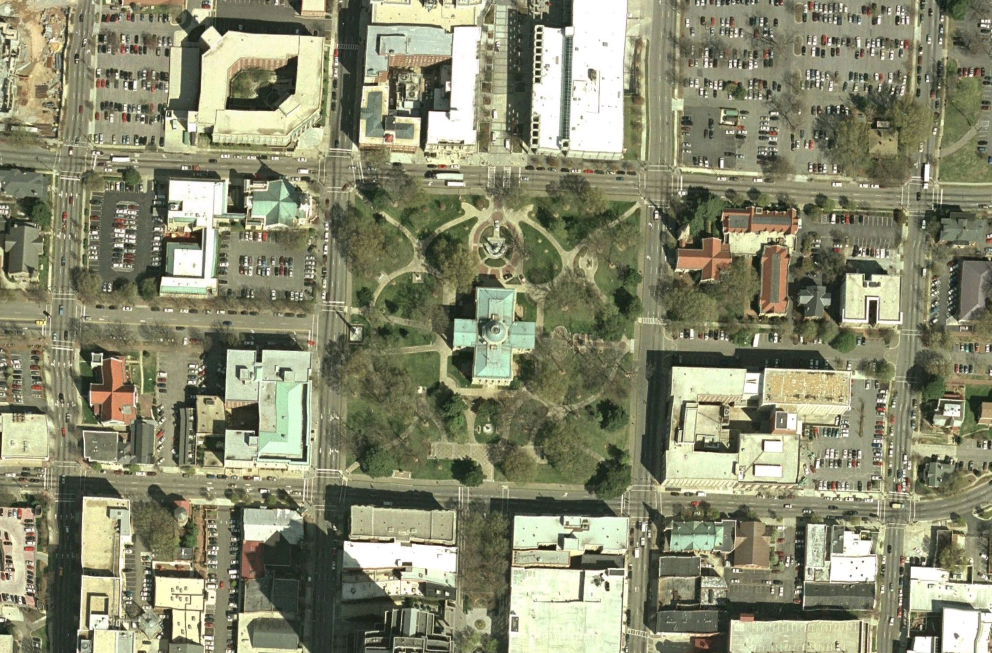
- Capitol satellite view, August 2006

- Location within North Carolina Location within the United States
- Location: 1 E Edenton St, Raleigh, North Carolina
- Coordinates: 35°46′48″N 78°38′15″W
- Area: 40 acres (16 ha)
- Architect: Multiple
- Architectural style: Classical Revival, Late Gothic Revival
- NRHP reference No.: 78001978
- Added to NRHP: April 15, 1978

The Capitol Area Historic District is a national historic district located at Raleigh, North Carolina. The district encompasses 25 contributing buildings and was developed after 1792. The district includes notable examples of Classical Revival and Late Gothic Revival style architecture. Located in the district are the following separately listed buildings:

- Agriculture Building, at 2 W. Edenton St.
- Church of the Good Shepherd at 121 Hillsborough St
- Christ Episcopal Church, at 120 E. Edenton St.
- Richard B. Haywood House, at 127 E. Edenton St.
- Haywood Hall, at 211 New Bern Pl.,
- North Carolina State Capitol, 1 E Edenton St.
- Raleigh Water Tower, 115 W. Morgan St.
- State Bank of North Carolina, at 123 New Bern Pl.
- Sacred Heart Church at 219 W Edenton St.
- White-Holman House, New Bern Ave.
- All Saints Chapel, at 110 S. East St.

Other notable buildings include the First Baptist Church (1859), Supreme Court and State Library Building (1888), Ruffin Building (1913), Revenue Building (1927), Education Building (1938, 1947), Justice Building (1939-1940), Highway Building (1950), Dr. Andrew Watson Goodwin House, and Montgomery House (1906).

It is also one of six Historic Overlay Districts in Raleigh. It was listed in 1978 on the National Register of Historic Places.
