= State Bank of North Carolina =

Historic building in North Carolina, US

- U.S. National Register of Historic Places
- U.S. Historic district – Contributing property
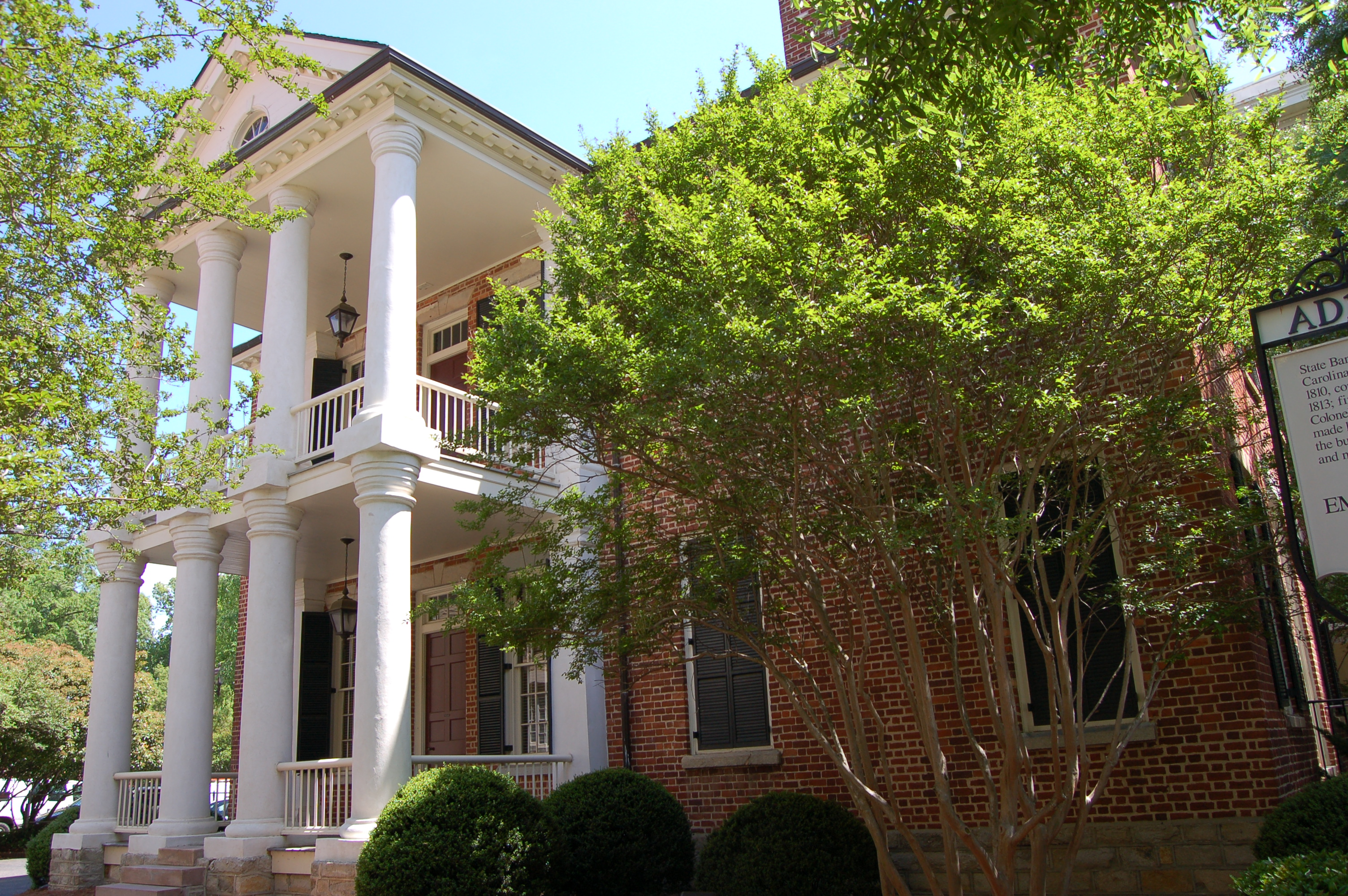

- Location within North Carolina Location within the United States
- Location: 11 New Bern Ave., Raleigh, North Carolina
- Coordinates: 35°46′58.88″N 78°38′15.02″W
- Area: 0.3 acres (0.12 ha)
- Built: 1813
- Architectural style: Greek Revival, Federal
- NRHP reference No.: 70000478
- Added to NRHP: July 1, 1970

The State Bank of North Carolina is the oldest surviving commercial building in Raleigh, North Carolina and was the first state-sponsored banking institution constructed in North Carolina. The bank was incorporated in 1810, but during the War of 1812 cash was moved inland to banks in Raleigh and Tarboro for fears that the British Army would attack the coast. The increase in money deposits resulted in the State Bank's construction in 1813. Jacob Johnson, the father of future President Andrew Johnson, was once employed at the bank. The building was listed on the National Register of Historic Places in 1970 and is a Raleigh Historic Landmark. It is located in the Capitol Area Historic District.

The design of the State Bank is influenced by the Federal and Greek Revival styles of architecture. The brick building features matching two-story porticos on the east and west sides, supported by columns. For sixty years the building was used for banking until the Christ Episcopal Church acquired the facility in 1873 to use as a rectory. In 1968 the North Carolina National Bank, a predecessor of Bank of America, purchased the building and moved it 100 ft (30 m) for use as the bank's downtown branch. The building was moved to make room for an addition to the Christ Church's parish facility. In 1976 the building was home to the State Commission in charge of North Carolina's bicentennial celebration. Currently, the building is still being used as a bank. The State Employees Credit Union are the current owners.

== See also ==
- List of Registered Historic Places in North Carolina
