= Raleigh Water Works and E.B. Bain Water Treatment Plant =

Historic complex in North Carolina, US

- U.S. National Register of Historic Places
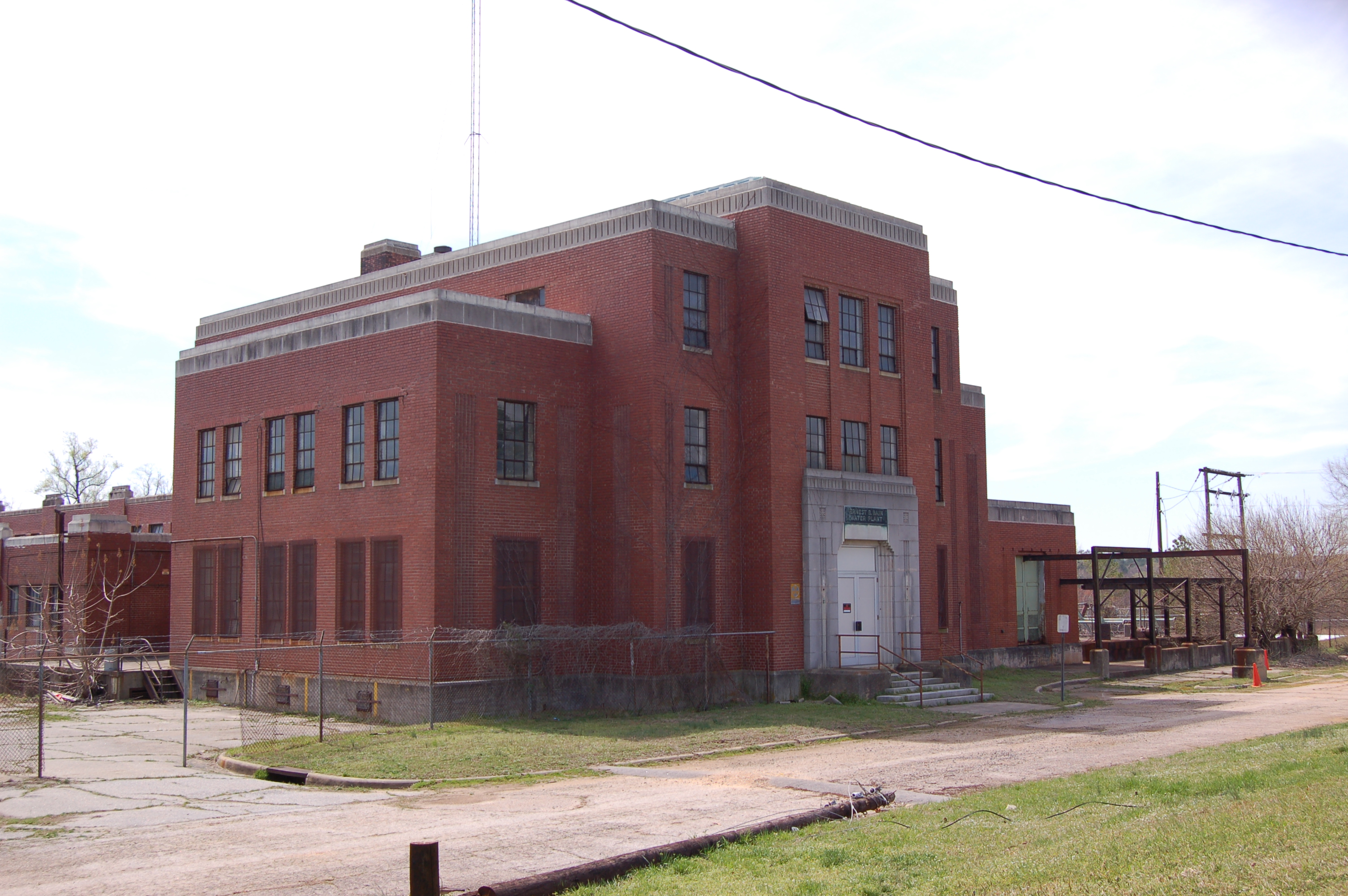
- E.B. Bain Water Treatment Plant in March 2008

- Location within North Carolina Location within the United States
- Location: 1810 Fayetteville Street, Raleigh, North Carolina
- Coordinates: 35°45′28″N 78°38′33″W
- Area: 8 acres (3.2 ha)
- Built: 1887, 1903, 1923, 1939–1940, 1951
- Architect: Arthur Winslow; William C. Olsen
- Architectural style: Art Moderne
- NRHP reference No.: 99001452
- Added to NRHP: November 22, 1999

The Raleigh Water Works and E.B. Bain Water Treatment Plant is a historic municipal water-treatment complex in Raleigh, North Carolina. Developed between 1887 and 1951, the complex includes the city's original water works and the Art Moderne-style E.B. Bain Water Treatment Plant, which was constructed in 1939–1940. The property illustrates more than six decades of the development of Raleigh's public water system and reflects the city's transformation from a small state capital into a modern urban center. Construction of the original Raleigh Water Works began in 1887 following the recommendation of engineer Arthur Winslow, providing the city's first modern public water system. As Raleigh expanded during the late nineteenth and early twentieth centuries, the facilities were enlarged several times before the city constructed the E.B. Bain Water Treatment Plant, designed by consulting engineer William C. Olsen with assistance from the Public Works Administration. Dedicated in 1940, the Bain plant served as Raleigh's sole water-treatment facility until the opening of the E. M. Johnson Water Treatment Plant in 1967 and remained in operation until 1987.

The Bain plant is regarded as one of North Carolina's most architecturally distinguished municipal utility buildings. Designed in the Art Moderne style, it combined water-treatment, pumping, laboratory, and administrative functions within a single integrated facility while incorporating portions of the earlier water works into its design. The complex was listed on the National Register of Historic Places in 1999 for its significance in engineering, architecture, and the history of Raleigh's municipal infrastructure.

== History ==
=== Establishment of the water works ===
Before the late nineteenth century, Raleigh depended primarily on public and private wells and cisterns. Concerns about sanitation and the city's growing population prompted the Raleigh Board of Aldermen to investigate the creation of a modern municipal water system during the 1880s. In 1886, the city retained civil engineer Arthur Winslow to survey potential water sources. Winslow recommended Walnut Creek, southeast of the city center.

On November 11, 1886, the Board of Aldermen granted the National Waterworks Construction Company of Ohio a 20-year franchise to construct and operate the system. The Raleigh Water Company was subsequently organized by the Ohio company and local investors. In January 1887, it purchased approximately 30 acres (12 ha) along Walnut Creek near Fayetteville Road, including an existing millpond and dam.

Winslow's design called for water to be drawn from Walnut Creek and conveyed to a steam-powered pumping station. The pumps forced the water through large filters and into a 1.5-million-US-gallon (5.7×10^{6} L) covered reservoir or into the city's distribution system. A water tower on West Morgan Street, now known as the Raleigh Water Tower, provided elevated storage and maintained pressure. The system was designed to supply as much as 2 million US gallons (7.6×10^{6} L) per day and was estimated to cost $155,000.

Construction began in early 1887. The work included a dam across Walnut Creek, an intake line, a brick pump house and filter house, the covered reservoir, distribution mains, and the downtown water tower. Although portions of the system were operating by July, the city conducted its formal acceptance test on September 29, 1887. During the test, fire streams were operated simultaneously at several locations to demonstrate the pressure and capacity of the new system.

The Raleigh Water Company initially struggled financially and had fewer than 700 customers after a decade of operation. Its assets and debts were transferred in 1901 to the locally owned Wake Water Company. That company entered receivership in 1912, and the City of Raleigh acquired the water system through arbitration in 1913 for $250,000, the amount of its bonded debt.

=== Expansion of the municipal system ===
The original filtration equipment soon proved inadequate. A new filter was designed in 1892, and by 1903 a larger filter house had been constructed beside the original reservoir. The 1887 filter house was thereafter used principally for storage. As Raleigh expanded during the early twentieth century, the city repeatedly enlarged both its sources of raw water and its treatment facilities.

Lake Raleigh was completed as an impounding reservoir on Walnut Creek in 1914. A second reservoir, originally called Lake Mattamuskeet and later renamed Lake Johnson, was completed in 1923. Consulting engineer William C. Olsen designed Lake Johnson as well as alterations to the Fayetteville Road water works. The 1923 improvements expanded the pump house and increased the site's filtration capacity to approximately 5 million US gallons (19×10^{6} L) per day. The original Walnut Creek dam was removed, its pond was filled, and the Morgan Street water tower was replaced by a newer tower near Saint Mary's School.

By the 1930s, the city possessed an adequate raw-water supply, but the existing plant could no longer treat water rapidly enough to meet periods of high demand. Residential development and the increasing use of water-cooled air-conditioning equipment added to the burden on the system. During a period of hot weather in May 1938, demand reached the plant's full capacity of five million gallons per day.

=== Construction of the Bain plant ===
Raleigh decided to replace the old treatment plant with a larger facility constructed with assistance from the federal Public Works Administration. The PWA supplied a grant covering 45 percent of an approximately $700,000 program that included the plant, additional supply mains, and a new water tank. City voters authorized bonds to finance the remainder.

Contracts were awarded in July 1939, and construction began that summer. Olsen prepared the plans and specifications, with L. E. Wooten and J. R. Cook serving as resident engineers. A. H. Guion Company of Charlotte was the general contractor. The new facility was constructed on the site of the earlier water works and incorporated portions of the existing plant, including treatment basins and the 1887 reservoir. Water service continued without interruption during construction and the transition to the new system.

The plant was dedicated by Mayor Graham Andrews on June 18, 1940. It was named for Ernest Battle Bain, who had joined the Raleigh Water Company in 1897, became manager of the Walnut Creek plant in 1899, and served as superintendent of Raleigh's water system for approximately four decades.

The completed plant combined filtration, pumping, administration, and laboratory functions within a single complex. Four electric pumps supplied the city's approximately 134 miles (216 km) of water mains, while a gasoline-powered pump provided emergency backup. The plant had a rated capacity of 8 million US gallons (30×10^{6} L) per day, could process nearly ten million gallons under favorable conditions, and was designed to permit future expansion.

=== Later operation and closure ===
The Bain plant was Raleigh's sole source of treated water from 1940 until 1967. Continued population growth again strained the system after World War II. In 1951, the plant was expanded to a treatment capacity of 13 million US gallons (49×10^{6} L) per day. The city also enlarged Lake Johnson and developed additional reservoirs, including Lake Wheeler and Lake Benson.

By the early 1960s, the expanded Bain plant could no longer meet peak demand. Raleigh constructed the E. M. Johnson Water Treatment Plant on the Neuse River, and that facility entered service in 1967. The Bain and Johnson plants operated together for the following two decades. Bain was removed from service in July 1987, although its clear-water reservoirs continued for a time to provide backup storage for water treated at the Johnson plant.

The water-works complex was listed on the National Register of Historic Places on November 22, 1999. The nomination recognized both its association with Raleigh's development and the engineering and architectural significance of the Art Moderne Bain plant.

== Architecture ==
=== Design ===
The E.B. Bain Water Treatment Plant was designed by consulting engineer William C. Olsen as the centerpiece of Raleigh's modernized municipal water system. Constructed in 1939–1940, the building was executed in the Art Moderne style, a streamlined form of Art Deco that became widely associated with public buildings and infrastructure projects during the late 1930s. According to its National Register nomination, the Bain plant is among North Carolina's finest surviving examples of Art Moderne industrial architecture and illustrates the growing attention given to the architectural design of municipal utility buildings during the Public Works Administration era.

The treatment plant was designed to satisfy both functional and civic objectives. While accommodating the complex requirements of municipal water treatment, Olsen employed a restrained modernist vocabulary intended to give the facility a monumental public presence. The National Register nomination notes that the building demonstrates how advances in engineering and public health were increasingly expressed through architecture during the early twentieth century, particularly in major municipal infrastructure projects.

=== Treatment plant ===
The principal building is a massive three-story masonry structure consisting of a reinforced concrete frame clad in Flemish bond brickwork with cast stone trim. Its composition is organized around a dominant central block flanked by stepped-back side sections, creating a balanced façade that emphasizes horizontal lines and geometric massing rather than applied ornament. Long bands of steel-sash windows admit natural light into the interior while reinforcing the streamlined appearance characteristic of the Art Moderne style.

The interior was planned around the treatment process while maintaining an unusually high architectural standard. Administrative offices and laboratory facilities occupy the principal public spaces, with pumping equipment, filtration systems, and treatment basins arranged according to operational requirements. The National Register nomination observes that several of the plant's large interior spaces received a degree of architectural finish more commonly associated with civic buildings than industrial facilities, despite being seen primarily by plant employees.

The building was also designed for long-term adaptability. Its original layout anticipated future expansion, allowing additional treatment equipment to be incorporated as Raleigh's demand for water increased. Improvements completed in 1951 substantially increased the plant's treatment capacity while preserving the overall architectural character of the original design.

=== Earlier structures ===
Although the Bain plant is the architectural focus of the property, the historic complex preserves structures dating to multiple phases of Raleigh's municipal water system. Surviving components include the shell of the original 1887 brick pump house, the 1887 filter house, the covered reservoir, and later improvements associated with the 1903 and 1923 expansions of the water works.

Rather than replacing the earlier facilities entirely, the 1939–1940 project incorporated significant elements of the existing water works into the new treatment complex. The resulting property preserves more than six decades of continuous development in municipal water treatment, illustrating the evolution of Raleigh's public water system from its nineteenth-century origins through the mid-twentieth century. The National Register nomination identifies this continuity, together with the architectural distinction of the Bain plant itself, as a principal reason for the property's historic significance.

== See also ==
- Raleigh Water Tower
- National Register of Historic Places listings in Wake County, North Carolina
- Public Works Administration
