= All Saints Chapel (Raleigh, North Carolina) =

Historic church in North Carolina, United States

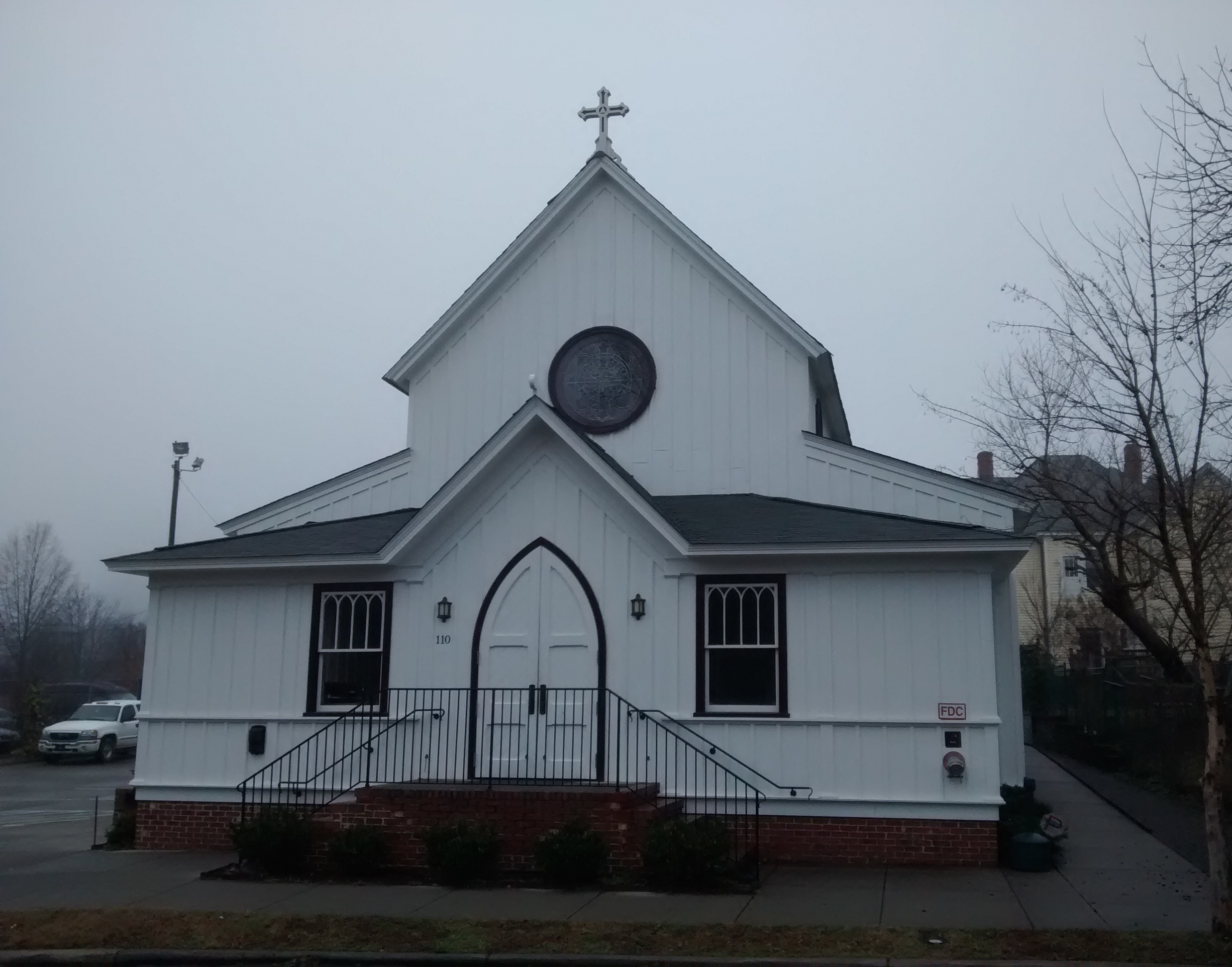

Religion
- Affiliation: Episcopal Church (former)
- District: Episcopal Diocese of North Carolina (former)

Location
- Location: 110 S. East St. Raleigh, North Carolina, United States
- Interactive map of All Saints Chapel

Architecture
- Architect: Johannes Adam Simon Oertel
- Type: Chapel
- Style: Carpenter Gothic
- Completed: 1875
- Materials
- Free Church of the Good Shepherd
- U.S. National Register of Historic Places
- Location within North Carolina Location within the United States
- Location: 110 S. East St., Raleigh, North Carolina
- Coordinates: 35°46′50″N 78°37′57″W
- Area: 0.2 acres (0.081 ha)
- Built: 1874
- Built by: Ellington & Atkins
- Architect: Oertel, Rev. Johannes A. S.
- NRHP reference No.: 08000888
- Added to NRHP: September 10, 2008

Website
- allsaints1875.com

All Saints Chapel (listed as the Free Church of the Good Shepherd on the National Register of Historic Places) is a historic Episcopal chapel in downtown Raleigh, North Carolina. It was formerly the home of the Episcopal Church of the Good Shepherd. The chapel was built for a new congregation that branched off of Christ Episcopal Church in 1874. It was sold to a private owner in 2006 and extensively renovated in 2008. All Saints Chapel has been a privately owned venue for weddings and events since 2008 and has been used for worship services by Redeemer Anglican Church, a congregation of the Anglican Church in North America since 2015.

== History ==
The chapel was built in the middle of the 19th century for a new congregation, as there was only one Episcopal church in Raleigh, North Carolina at the time of construction. In 1873 it was suggested that a new Episcopal Church in Raleigh be started after a disagreement over pew rentals in the city and in 1874, a piece of land was purchased on the corner of McDowell and Hillsborough Street. There, All Saints Chapel was built in 1875 to be the home of the Church of the Good Shepherd parish, made mostly of wood and built in the Carpenter Gothic style. Near the beginning of the 20th century the chapel moved from its original foundation to the south side of the church lot along Morgan Street as to free up space. In 2006 the chapel was sold to Empire Properties who renovated portions of the interior and exterior. The chapel was transported roughly half a mile to its current location along East Street, just west of the Historic Oakwood neighborhood. Since its sale, the chapel is no longer associated with the Church of the Good Shepherd or the Episcopal Church. Currently, services for Redeemer Anglican Church, a congregation of the Anglican Church in North America, are held weekly.

The chapel was listed on the National Register of Historic Places in 2008.
