= Richard B. Haywood House =

Historic house in North Carolina, United States

- U.S. National Register of Historic Places
- U.S. Historic district – Contributing property
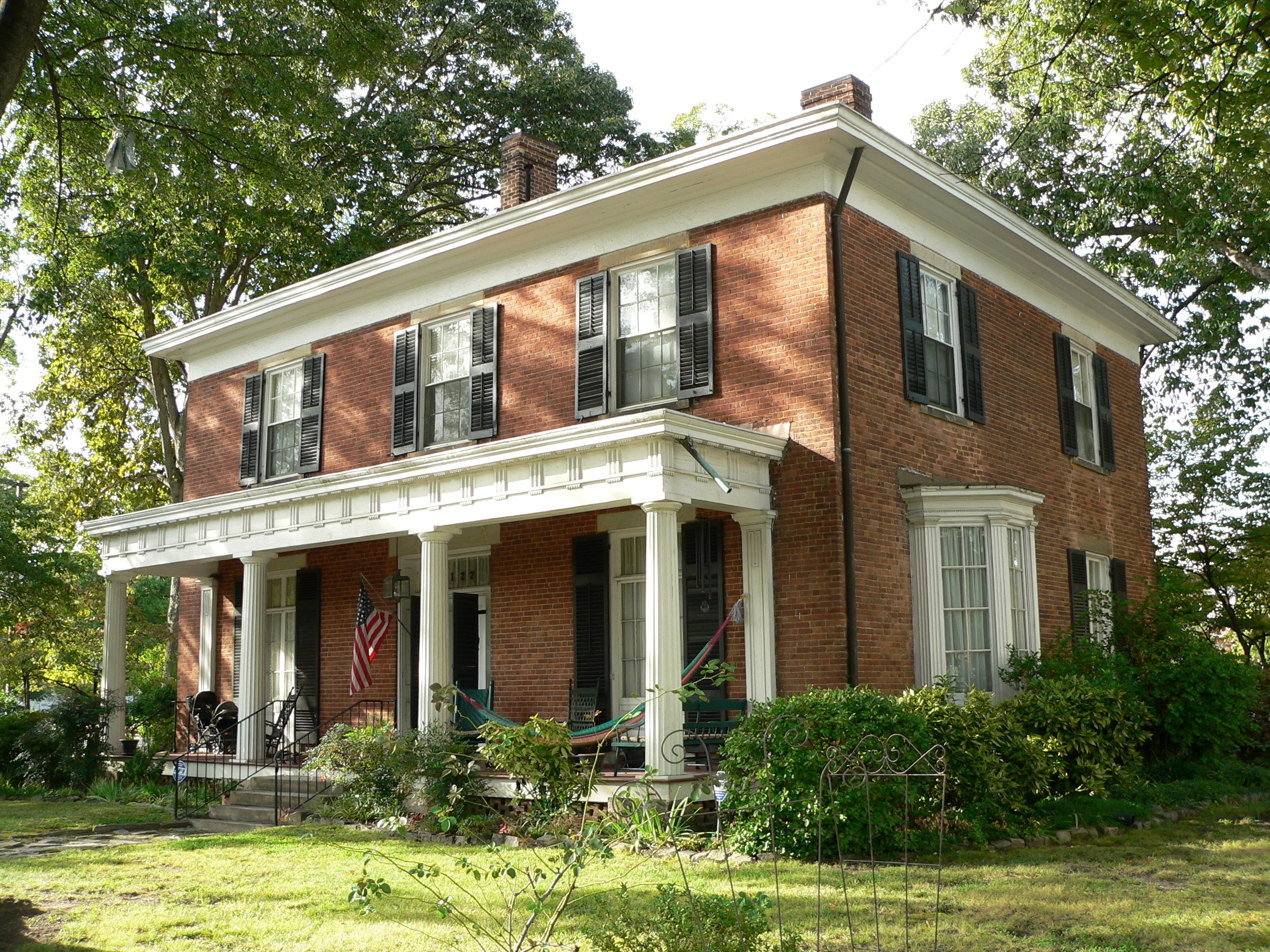

- Location within North Carolina Location within the United States
- Location: 127 East Edenton St., Raleigh, North Carolina
- Coordinates: 35°46′53.0″N 78°38′12.1″W
- Area: 0.31 acres (0.13 ha)
- Built: 1854
- Architect: Dr. Richard B. Haywood
- Architectural style: Greek Revival
- NRHP reference No.: 70000471
- Added to NRHP: July 28, 1970

The Richard B. Haywood House, built in 1854, is a historic residence in the Capitol Area Historic District in Raleigh, North Carolina. The house is listed on the National Register of Historic Places, and is the last home in the Capitol Area Historic District. The home is still owned by the Haywood family.

Dr. Richard B. Haywood opposed North Carolina's secession from the United States during the Civil War, however he served as a surgeon in the North Carolina Militia on the staff of the Surgeon General. Union General William Tecumseh Sherman reached Raleigh after the Confederate defeat at Bentonville, the last major battle of the Carolinas campaign. On April 13, 1865, Raleigh Mayor William H. Harrison asked Dr. Haywood to serve on a committee of emissaries that surrendered Raleigh to Sherman. The occupying Union forces in Raleigh were under the command of Major General Frank P. Blair, a friend of Dr. Haywood during their attendance at the University of North Carolina at Chapel Hill. Blair chose the Richard B. Haywood House as his headquarters during the occupation of Raleigh. Dr. Haywood and Blair hosted Sherman and General Ulysses S. Grant at the house.
