= Raleigh Water Tower =

- U.S. National Register of Historic Places
- U.S. Historic district – Contributing property
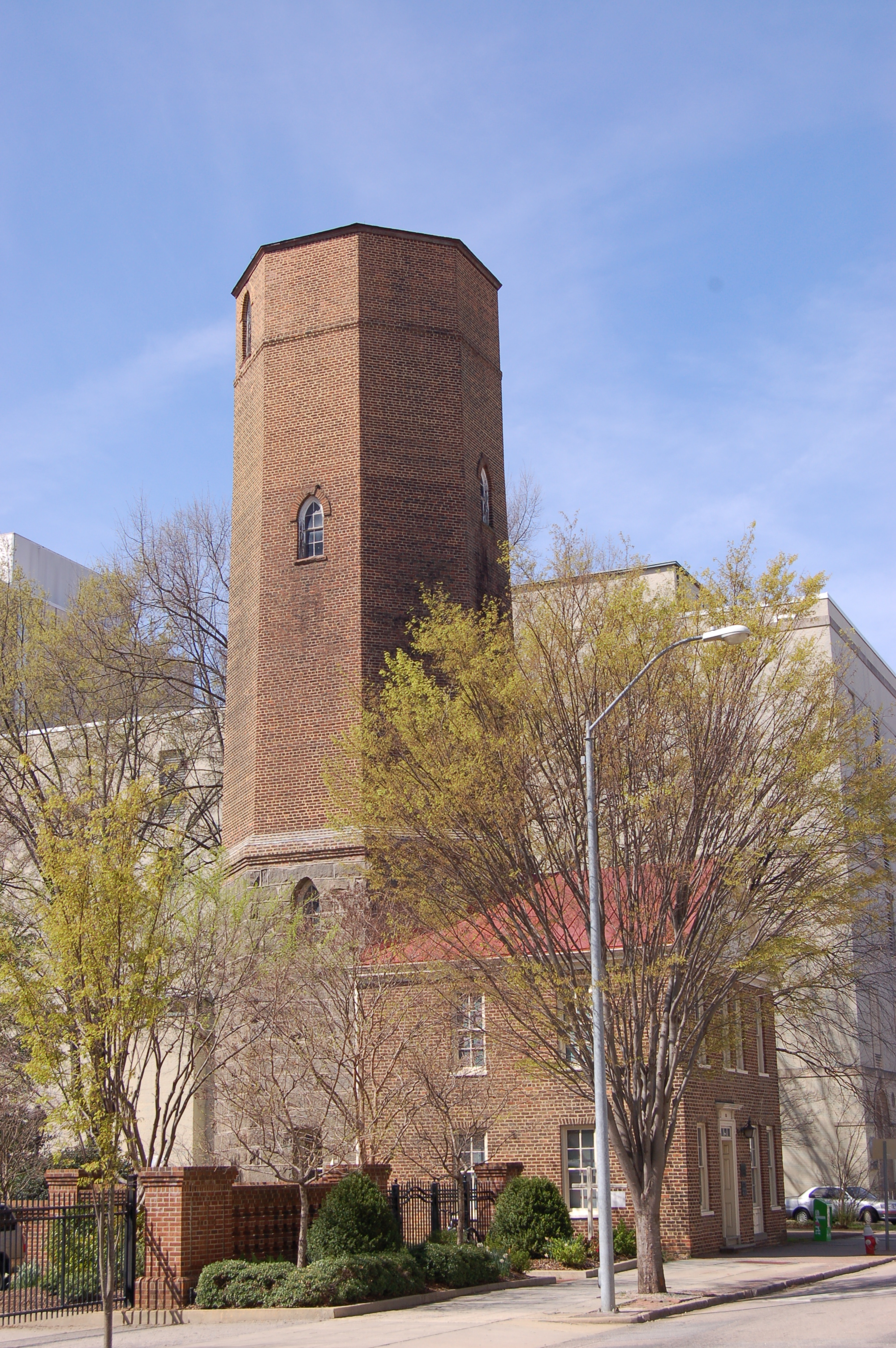

- Location within North Carolina Location within the United States
- Location: 115 W. Morgan St., Raleigh, North Carolina
- Coordinates: 35°46′46.2″N 78°38′27.7″W
- Area: 0.3 acres (0.12 ha)
- Built: 1887
- Architectural style: Colonial Revival
- NRHP reference No.: 71000625
- Added to NRHP: December 16, 1971

The Raleigh Water Tower is a historic building that was the first water tower built in Raleigh, North Carolina. Constructed in 1887, the City of Raleigh relied on the tower for 37 years until it was decommissioned in 1924. Formerly, the building was used as the headquarters for the North Carolina Chapter of the American Institute of Architects (AIA)., however it was recently sold to the law firm of Shirley & Adams. Shirley & Adams leased the tower out to be the headquarters for the franchise management company for Smithfield's Chicken 'N BBQ while the firm of Gammon, Howard & Zeszotarski, PLLC occupy the former firehouse at the back of the property. The Raleigh Water Tower was listed on the National Register of Historic Places in 1971 and is a Raleigh Historic Landmark. It is located in the Capitol Area Historic District.

== History ==
Before construction of the tower, most water in Raleigh came from private wells and cisterns. In the 1880s a municipal system was developed to address concerns of water quality. Water from Walnut Creek was drawn by a private company and was carried from a dam by pipes to a nearby pumping station. Water was forced by steam pumps through sand filters, and either into a reservoir on site or through pipes to the water tower downtown. A 100,000 gallon water tank sat on top of the octagonal tower. In addition, offices were housed in an attached two-story building and a stand-alone building behind the tower contained a maintenance shop.

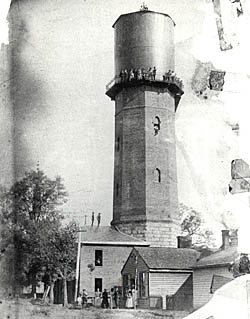
Historic view of the Raleigh Water Tower

By the beginning of the 20th century the water system was supplying the entire city, and the growing population of Raleigh increased the need for more water. In 1913, the city bought the facility and built a larger dam upstream, removing the one built in 1887. By 1924 the water tower had been abandoned and its tank removed. Raleigh architect William Henley Deitrick purchased the facility in 1938 and converted the aging tower into his architectural offices. He removed the nine 12x12 inch heart pine columns that once supported the tank and created four interior floors. He connected the tower to the rear building with a walled garden courtyard. Known by local architects as "The Tower," it became a gathering place for local architects and was the location where many buildings, such as Dorton Arena, were finalized. In 1963, the facility was deeded to the North Carolina chapter of the AIA with binding preservation covenants. The AIA renovated the site in the 1990s and will maintain the property as its state headquarters until their new headquarters is complete.

== New owners ==
In early October 2010, the water tower was sold to the law firm of Shirley & Adams for $635,000. They temporarily occupied the small building to the rear of the property prior to the NC AIA moving to their new headquarters, located a few blocks away. Shirley & Adams have maintained the exterior appearance of the building in accordance with its historic landmark status.

In May 2012, Gammon, Howard & Zeszotarski, PLLC took up residence in the former firehouse behind the Water Tower. The firm focuses its practice on litigation, including state and federal criminal defense.

The tower was used as the headquarters for the franchise management company for Smithfield's Chicken 'N Bar-B-Q - a local North Carolina staple.

In January 2019, Tower Escapes opened an escape room at the Raleigh Water Tower location. Two of the escape rooms are inside the tower.

== See also ==
- National Register of Historic Places listings in Wake County, North Carolina
