= Olivia Raney Library =

American library

Coordinates: 35°46′7″N 78°34′11″W

The Olivia Raney Local History Library, previously the Olivia Raney Memorial Library and alternatively referred to as the Olivia Raney Library, shares its name with the first library founded in the Wake County Public Library system and the first public library founded in Raleigh, North Carolina, formally opened January 24, 1901. The library was named as a memorial to the benefactor’s wife, an American church organist and choral singer.

The historical location of the Olivia Raney Library would close in December 1962 and operations were relocated to a department store building downtown. The library closed again in 1985 and reopened at its current location in the Wake County Office Park on Poole Road in 1996.

The Olivia Raney Library specializes in materials pertaining to the local history of Wake County, Raleigh, North Carolina, as well as other materials pertaining to surrounding counties and parts of bordering states. Notable services include microfilm readers, property tax records for Wake and surrounding counties, a newspaper collection dating back to 1799, and a rotating exhibit.

== Namesake ==
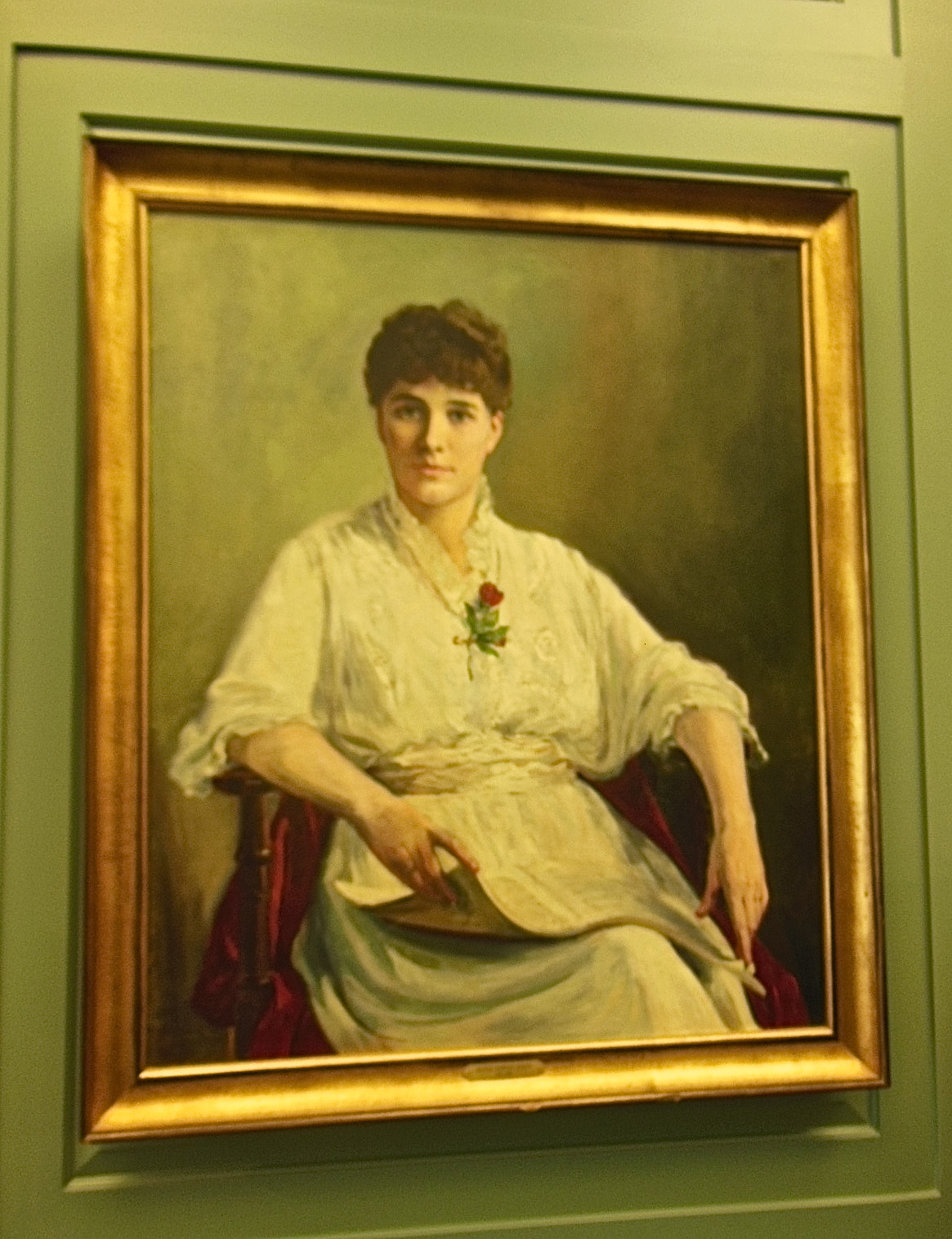
Portrait of Olivia Raney

Olivia Raney, née Cowper, moved to Raleigh, North Carolina at age 10. She lived in the Five Points neighborhood on McDowell Street between Edenton and Hillsborough. She was known as an accomplished musician and served as the organist for Christ Episcopal Church. She is assumed to have come from a relatively affluent family.

Olivia Raney married when she was 33 and her husband was 34, a closeness in age which was unconventional for their time. Her husband, Richard Beverly Raney, had a prolific business resume. He was the proprietor of the Yarborough House hotel in Raleigh; a director of several companies between Raleigh, Greensboro and Winston; an operator of farms in both Wake and Warren counties; and later, a president of the Raleigh Chamber of Commerce. Before their marriage, Olivia and Richard B. Raney were friends and pen pals during his travels around the world.

The couple had been married seventeen months and Olivia was expecting her first child when she died on May 4, 1896 at thirty-four years old. The reason given for her death was pregnancy complications. A local headline read, "One of Raleigh’s Most Cultured and Beloved Women Passes Away."

== History ==
Richard B. Raney funded the Olivia Raney Memorial Library in his late wife’s memory, in response to a public appeal posted on behalf of a Raleigh Chamber of Commerce soliciting committee. Before this, the library was planned to be funded gradually through stockholder subscription fees. The library was chartered in 1899; a deed was accepted February 28, 1900, for a lot in downtown Raleigh on the southwest corner of Hillsboro and Salisbury streets. The library opened January 24, 1901, with a local newspaper describing it as "the most notable event in the history of North Carolina."

Initially, the Olivia Raney served Raleigh’s white population. The library would extend services to all white Wake County citizens in 1927. An additional library opened for Wake County’s Black citizens, the Richard B. Harrison on Hargett Street, in 1935.

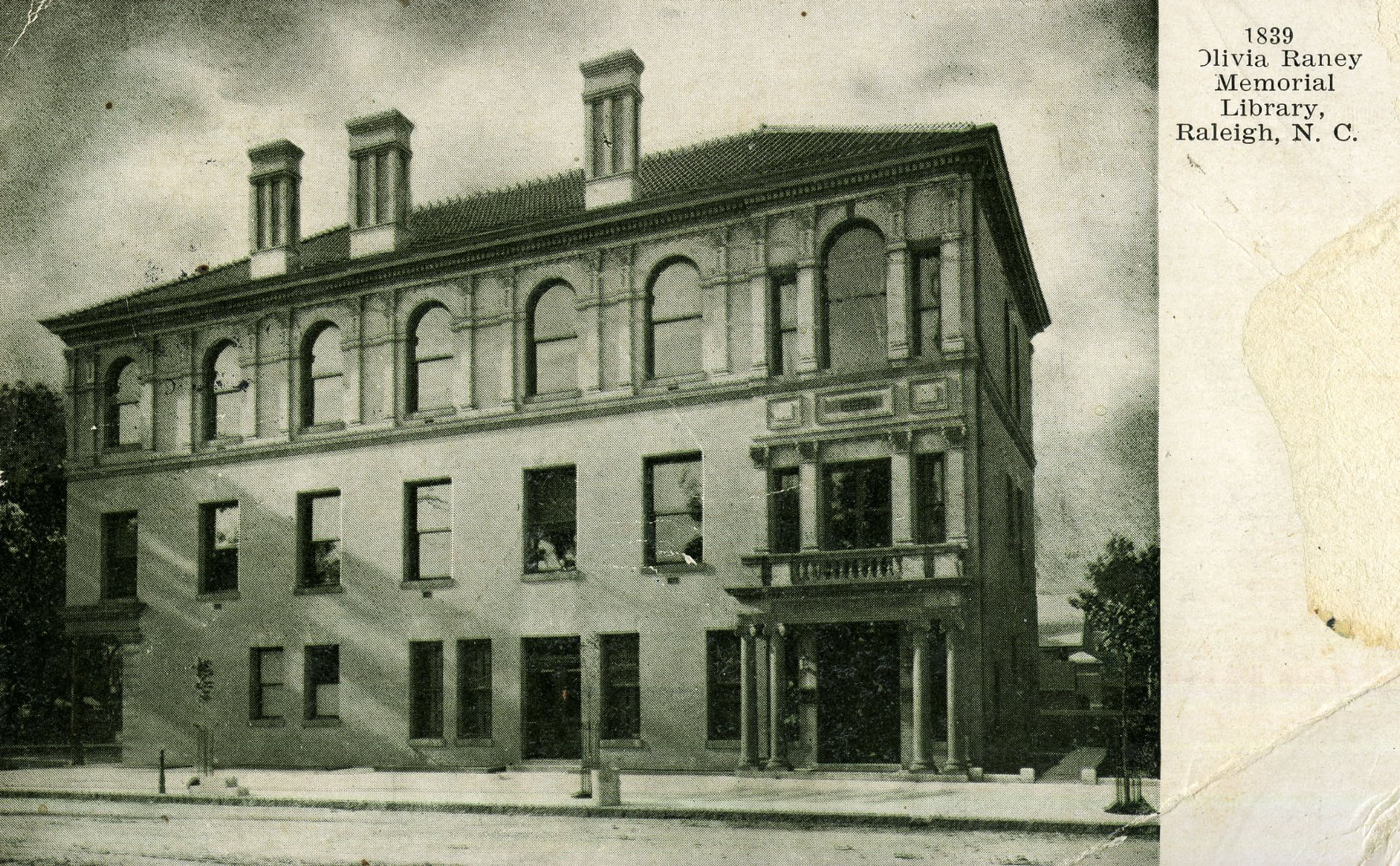
Postcard depicting exterior of Olivia Raney Library at Hillsborough and Salisbury Streets; Raleigh, NC

The original location of the Olivia Raney Library was a three-story, cream brick building with a red terracotta tile roof and an ornate entrance flanked by columns. The first floor hosted the librarian’s living space and a meeting room for the library trustees. The second floor was dedicated to the library’s collections itself, initially about 5000 books, with an additional private office, a ladies’ reception room, and a smoking room. An October 17, 1900 edition of the Raleigh Times and Evening Visitor described the reading room as having “abundant light,” with six large windows, and being well-decorated. The third floor of the library building was dedicated to the auditorium/music room, where the stage curtain featured an image of the Taj Mahal, a subject of Richard B. Raney’s travels. The gentleman’s reception room was located on the third floor as well.

Richard B. Raney paid $45,000 for the completed building and established a 99-year trust to continue to help fund it. He was also placed on the twin Committees on Books and Administration in 1899; at the time the library was considered a “corporation” with its own Executive Committee. The library’s initial collection consisted of about 5,000 books, afforded by R. B. Raney, with additional contributions from citizen donations. Raney would go on to leave about $2,000, or a tenth of his estate, to the Olivia Raney Library after his death in December 8, 1909, towards investment and general upkeep of the building. His death was said to be sudden, though he had suffered from illness before, most notably on the library’s commencement day which he was unable to attend. Richard B. Raney’s patronage was critical to keeping the library open as even when the General Assembly permitted monthly appropriations, the Olivia Raney regularly struggled with funding.

The inability to obtain appropriate state funding was a persistent obstacle to regular maintenance of the Olivia Raney Memorial Library building. The library struggled with space limitations from as early as 1916. Several solutions were attempted from then until 1960, including integrating a rental book collection to save shelf space and converting an old street level drug store into a reading room. A study by the Junior Chamber of Commerce in 1959 ultimately concluded the building could not be renovated further due to “structural weakness.” A following report by the American Library Association recommended finding a new building.

Before the Olivia Raney moved locations, the initial trust ceded control, replaced by a general library commission. By 1960, the Olivia Raney Library and Richard B. Harrison libraries were joined by other local Wake County libraries in cities such as Wendell and Fuquay-Varina. The library commission would oversee all library services within the county, though the establishment of the library system as a full department of the Wake County government would occur later, in July 1977.

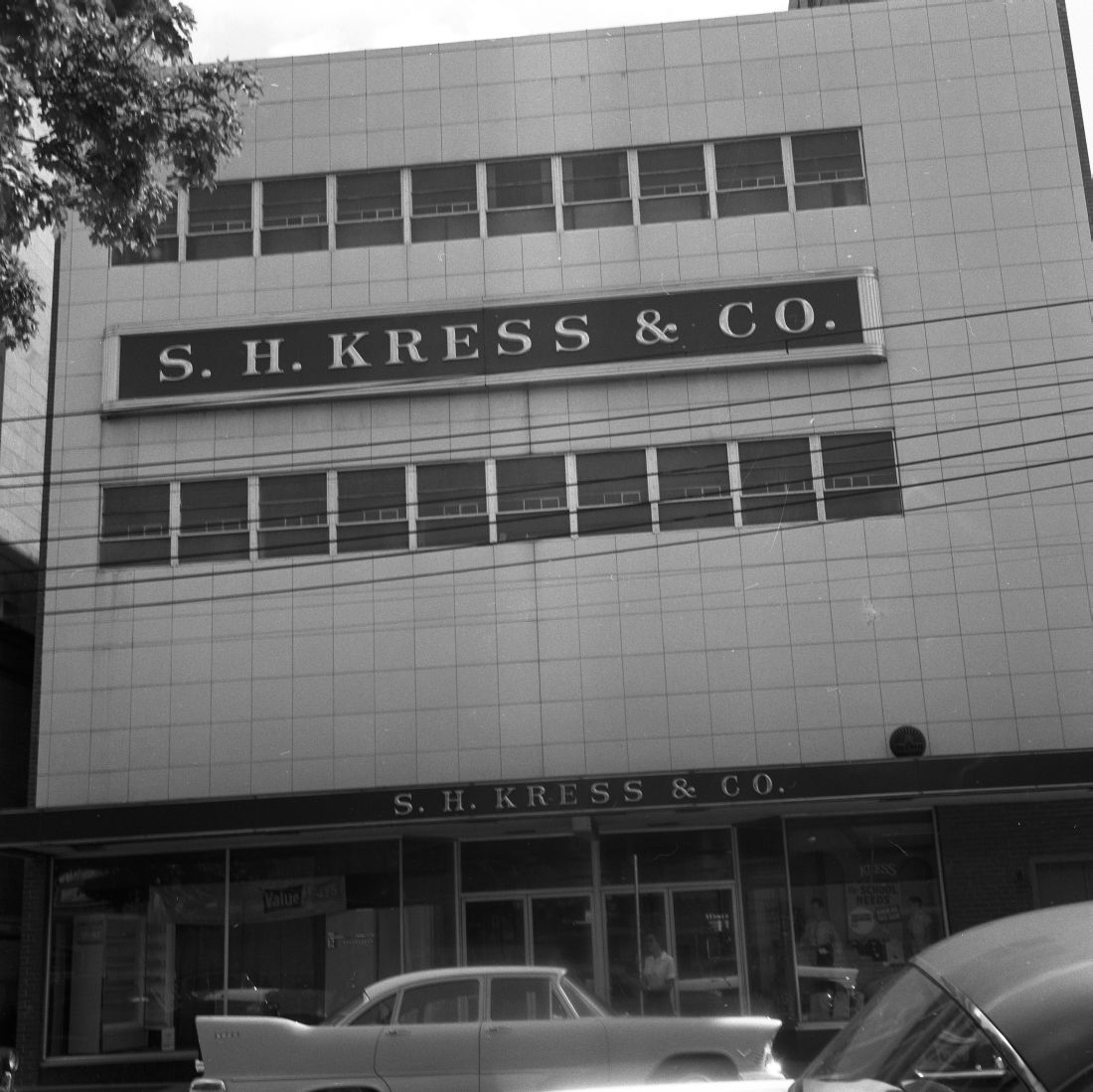
Exterior of Kress Company building in the late 50s, before renovation into Olivia Raney Public Library

On January 3, 1963, the Olivia Raney Public Library reopened in a renovated Kress Department Store building at Fayetteville Street Mall. The original library building was demolished in 1966.

The new Olivia Raney Library building would come to share space with the county. The first floor of the building was converted into a temporary location for the future Business and Professional Library. Ultimately, in 1985, the state purchased the Olivia Raney for $700,000 in order to convert it into an Attorney General’s office.

The Olivia Raney local history materials were relocated between the Cameron Village and Southeast Regional locations. A Local History Task Force was formed in 1992 to help establish a permanent local history collection, and the formation of a dedicated local history library is attributed to this task force.

It would take until 1996 for an Olivia Raney library to reopen to the public, as its current iteration as a local history library in the Wake County Office Park.

== Community impact ==
From its opening, the Olivia Raney Library served as a “cultural center” for Raleigh in part because of its auditorium, which allowed it to host debates, dramas and musical events. The building often saw about 100 patrons at one time in its first year. Its reference department saw regular use by literary club members as well as the students and teachers of nearby schools such as St. Mary’s, Wake Forest College and the Baptist Female University, now known as Meredith College. The library’s periodical indexes with several complete and near-complete files were especially popular. There were 4,000 books on the shelves and 32,000 books circulated in the Olivia Raney Library's first year. In 1931, the yearly circulation was 217,000 books from a collection of about 25,000 books.

Notable instances of community outreach, before the library’s first major renovation, included processing thousands of books to ship to World War I camp libraries, on 1917 and 1918. Starting in 1928, with the help of Women’s Club volunteers, books were distributed to shut-ins and the St. Luke’s Home for Old Ladies; a 250 book collection was placed in Rex Hospital on April 1928, and a smaller collection was placed in the Mary Elizabeth Hospital a few months later. The Olivia Raney Library also provided outreach to county community libraries, assisting with curating collections, processing books, and loaning from their own location.

The Olivia Raney Library also operated a bookmobile with a three-month demonstration occurring in 1941 and over 50 stops established by spring of 1942. The bookmobile was shared between the Olivia Raney Library and the Richard B. Harrison Library, meaning it alternately served white and Black patrons, across twelve consecutive days for the former and eight for the latter.
