= Haywood Hall =

Historic house in North Carolina, United States

- U.S. National Register of Historic Places
- U.S. Historic district – Contributing property
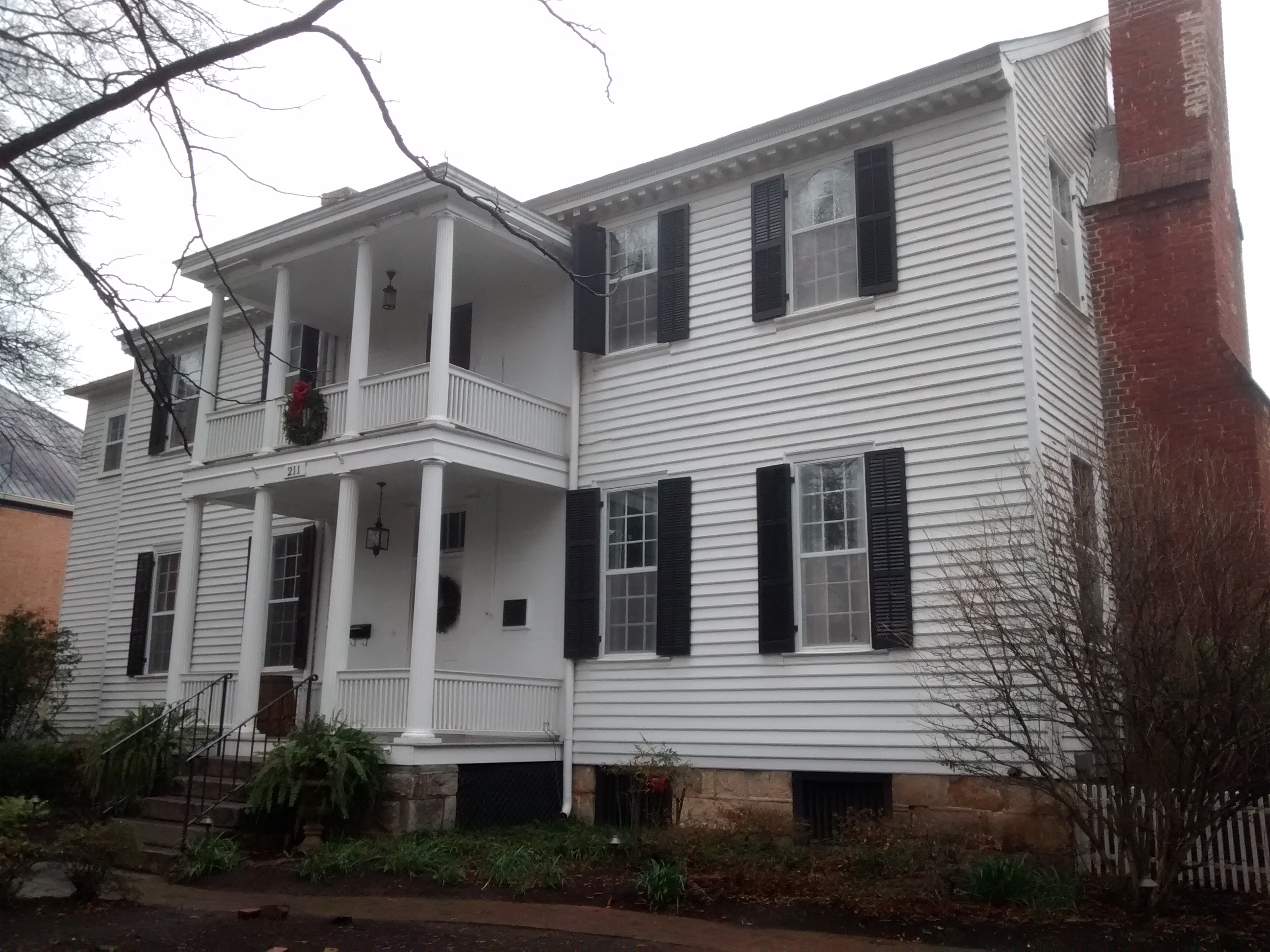
- Haywood Hall, December 2014

- Location within North Carolina Location within the United States
- Location: 211 New Bern Ave., Raleigh, North Carolina
- Coordinates: 35°47′8″N 78°38′17″W
- Area: 1 acre (0.40 ha)
- Built: 1792
- Architectural style: Federal
- NRHP reference No.: 70000470
- Added to NRHP: July 28, 1970

Haywood Hall, also known as the Treasurer John Haywood House, is a historic home located at Raleigh, Wake County, North Carolina, United States. It was built in 1799, and is a two-story, five-bay, Federal-style frame dwelling with a central hall plan. It features a two-story front porch with attenuated fluted Doric order columns. It was the home of the first North Carolina State Treasurer John Haywood (1754–1827). It is now open as a historic house museum.

It was listed on the National Register of Historic Places in 1970. It is located in the Capitol Area Historic District.
