= Agriculture Building =

Government building in North Carolina, US

- U.S. National Register of Historic Places
- U.S. Historic district – Contributing property
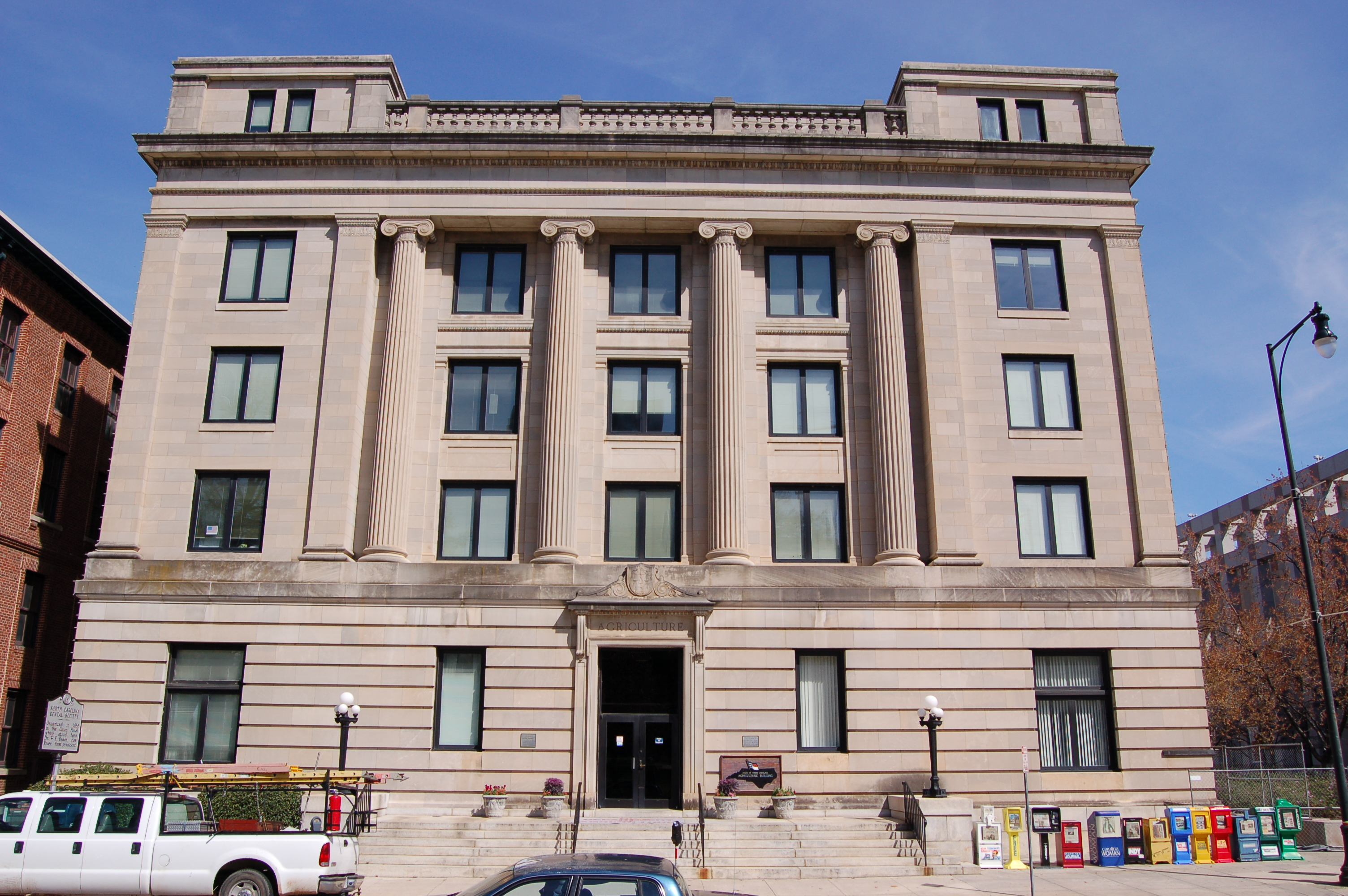
- Agriculture Building, March 2008

- Location within North Carolina Location within the United States
- Location: 2 W. Edenton St., Raleigh, North Carolina
- Coordinates: 35°46′53″N 78°38′22″W
- Area: less than one acre
- Built: 1921-1923
- Architect: Nelson & Cooper
- Architectural style: Classical Revival
- NRHP reference No.: 76001341
- Added to NRHP: June 16, 1976

The Agriculture Building is a historic state government office building located at Raleigh, Wake County, North Carolina. It was built between 1921 and 1923, and is a five-story, Classical Revival. It is sheathed in warm yellow stone, with massive, ashlar veneer, on the ground floor. An addition was built in the 1950s, giving the building an "L"-shape.

It was listed on the National Register of Historic Places in 1976. The Agriculture Building is a Raleigh Historic Landmark and located in the Capitol Area Historic District.

== History ==
=== Site history ===
The present Agriculture Building occupies the northwest corner of Edenton and Halifax streets, immediately north of the North Carolina State Capitol. The site was previously occupied by the Eagle Hotel, a prominent Raleigh hotel constructed during the second decade of the nineteenth century for Charles Parish. The hotel was among Raleigh's leading accommodations throughout much of the nineteenth century and later operated as the Guion Hotel and the National Hotel before being acquired by the State of North Carolina in 1879.

Following its acquisition, the state adapted the former hotel for use by the North Carolina Department of Agriculture. The building was extensively remodeled in 1883 under architect A. G. Bauer and was further enlarged in 1899–1900 with additions designed by the architectural firm of Pearson and Ashe to accommodate the department's expanding offices and the State Museum.

By the early twentieth century, the department had outgrown the former hotel despite successive enlargements. State officials ultimately decided to replace the aging structure with a purpose-built office building on the existing site. The former Agriculture Building was demolished, and construction of the present Classical Revival building began in 1921. The new building was completed in 1923.

== Architecture ==
Designed by the Raleigh architectural firm of Nelson & Cooper, the Agriculture Building is an example of Classical Revival architecture adapted for use as a twentieth-century state office building. The five-story structure is faced with warm yellow stone above a massive ashlar-veneer base. Its principal façade is symmetrically composed, with a monumental Ionic colonnade supporting a full entablature and parapet, reflecting the Beaux-Arts influence common in public architecture of the early twentieth century.

The building was designed to complement the neighboring North Carolina State Capitol and other government buildings surrounding Union Square while expressing the permanence and importance of the state's agricultural agency. Classical details, including engaged pilasters, balanced fenestration, and restrained ornamentation, reinforce the building's formal civic character.

A rear addition constructed during the 1950s expanded the building into an L-shaped plan while preserving the appearance of the original principal façade from Edenton Street.

== Role and use ==
The Agriculture Building was constructed as the headquarters of the North Carolina Department of Agriculture, replacing the department's former offices in the remodeled Eagle Hotel on the same site. The new building was designed to accommodate the department's expanding administrative responsibilities as North Carolina's agricultural programs grew during the early twentieth century.

Since its completion in 1923, the building has served as office space for the Department of Agriculture and its leadership, including the North Carolina Commissioner of Agriculture. The building continues to serve as part of the department's headquarters complex in downtown Raleigh, remaining one of the principal state government buildings surrounding Capitol Square.
