= Smithfield's Chicken 'N Bar-B-Q =

American fast food chain

- Industry: Fast food
- Founded: 1977; 49 years ago
- Founder: Junius Moore; Maggie Moore
- Headquarters: Smithfield, North Carolina; United States
- Website: scnbnc.com

Smithfield's Chicken 'N Bar-B-Q is a quick service restaurant chain in North Carolina serving fried chicken and Eastern North Carolina barbecue with 41 locations state-wide (as of March 2024) as well as an online store.

What is now Smithfield's Chicken 'N Bar-B-Q was opened by Junius and Maggie Moore in downtown Smithfield, North Carolina in 1977 as Smithfield Bar-B-Q, soon followed by a second restaurant in nearby Clayton, North Carolina. The business expanded in 1979 to Salter Path.

Starting in the early 1980s, the company opened additional restaurants in eastern North Carolina, and expanded to the Raleigh-Durham area in the 1990s.

== See also ==
- List of chicken restaurants
