= Johannes Adam Simon Oertel =

American painter

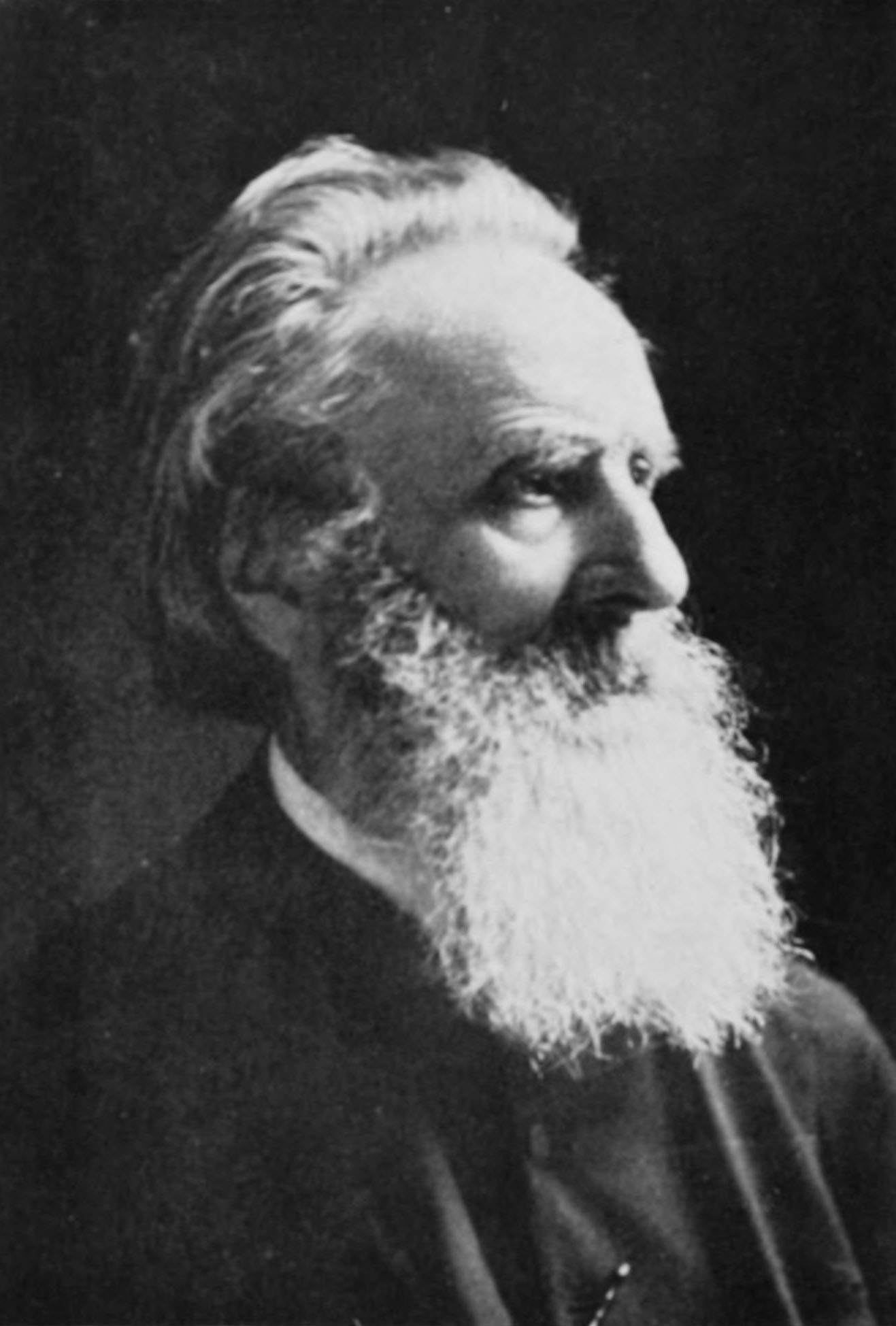
Portrait photograph of Oertel

Johannes Adam Simon Oertel (3 November 1823 in Fürth, Bavaria – 9 December 1909) was a German-American Episcopal clergyman and artist.

== Early life and education ==
Oertel studied art in Germany at Nuremberg and Munich.

== Career ==
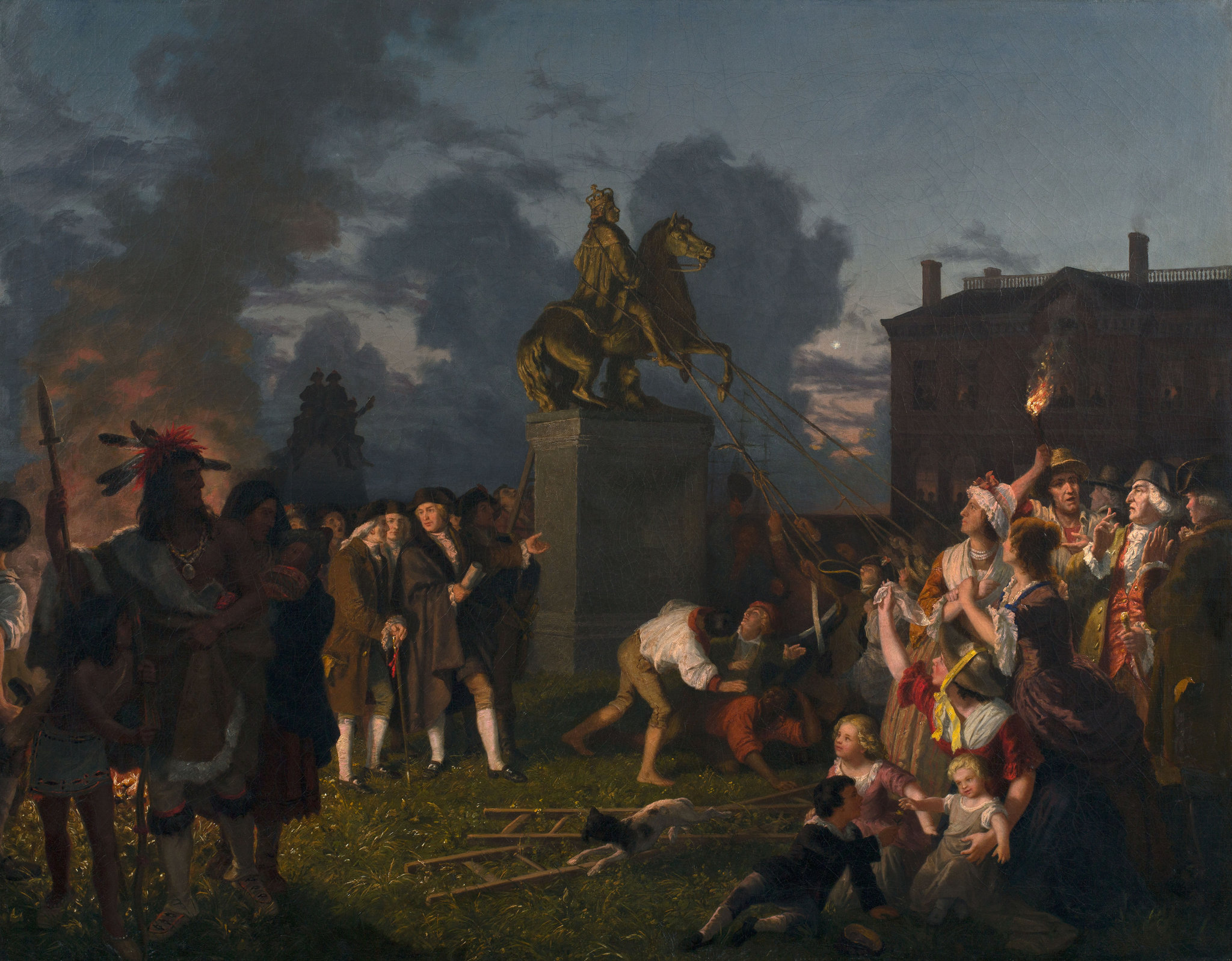
Pulling Down the Statue of King George III, New York City, c. 1859

After his education in Nuremberg and Munich, Oertel began engraving, which he continued until 1848. In 1849, he relocated to the United States and taught briefly in Newark, New Jersey. After his marriage, he engraved plates for bank notes, painted portraits, and colored photographs.

In 1857, Oertel was elected an associate of the National Academy of Design in New York City.

In 1857, Oertel moved to Madison, New Jersey, where he painted Lament of the Fallen Spirits and Redemption. Around this time, he was invited to assist in preparing new decorations for the new United States Capitol that was then under construction in Washington, D.C.

In 1861, he transferred his studio to Westerly, Rhode Island, where he painted Father Time and his Family and The Final Harvest (1862), The Dispensation of the Promise and the Law (including 150 figures, 1863), Walk to Emmaus, The Walk to Gethsemane, Easter Morning, Magdalen at the Sepulchre, The Rock of Ages, and others (1868).

His painting Rock of Ages became enormously popular and was reproduced in millions of photographs and chromolithographs and sold in both the U.S. and England.

=== American Civil War ===
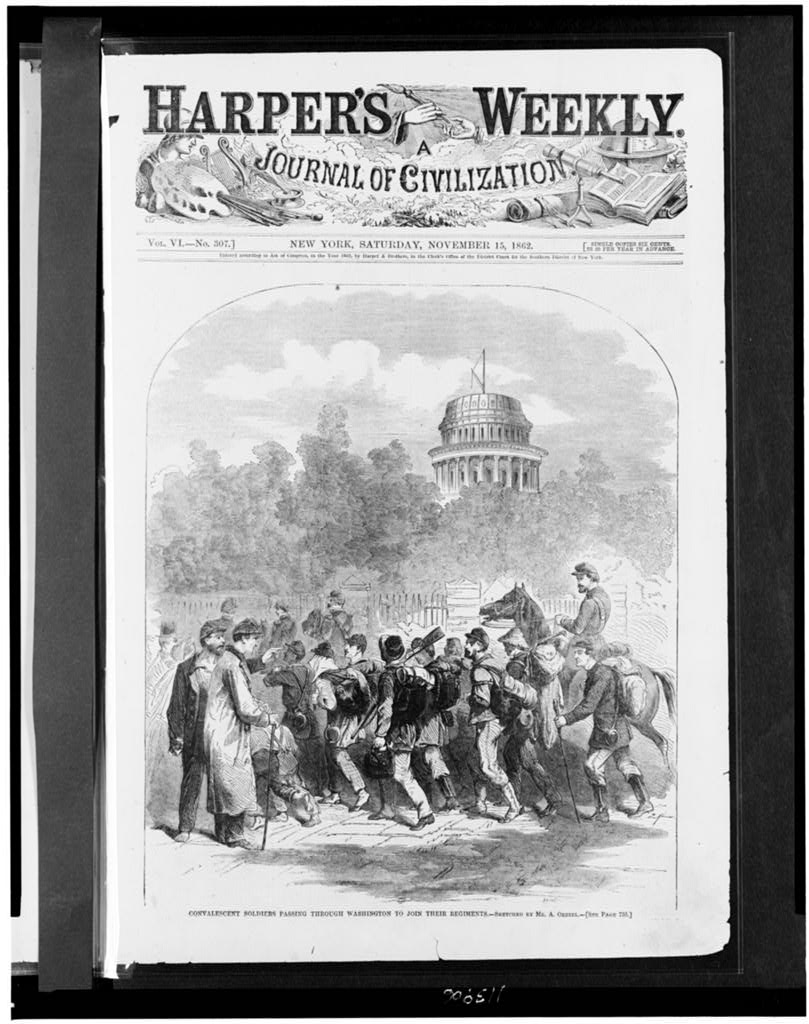
Convalescent Soldiers Passing Through Washington to Join their Units, 1864

During the American Civil War, Oertel accompanied the Army of Virginia under General Burnside for several months in 1862. His Virginia Turnpike and other landscapes were the fruit of his brief military experience. He painted some historical battle scenes, including one of the American Revolutionary War's Battle of Sullivan's Island, and some illustrations for Harper's Weekly, including a cover for the magazine's November 15, 1864 issue, Convalescent Soldiers Passing through Washington, DC, to Re-join their Units and The Union Scout.

While residing in Westerly, Rhode Island, Oertel was appointed an Episcopal Church deacon in 1865, and subsequently an Episcopalian presbyter. He then confined himself almost entirely to the domain of Christian art, painting pictures that he presented to churches in Glen Cove, New York, New York City, Washington, D.C., North Carolina, and elsewhere.

Oertel was in Washington, D.C., during the funeral of President Abraham Lincoln on April 19, 1865, and wrote an account of it.

=== St James Episcopal Church ===
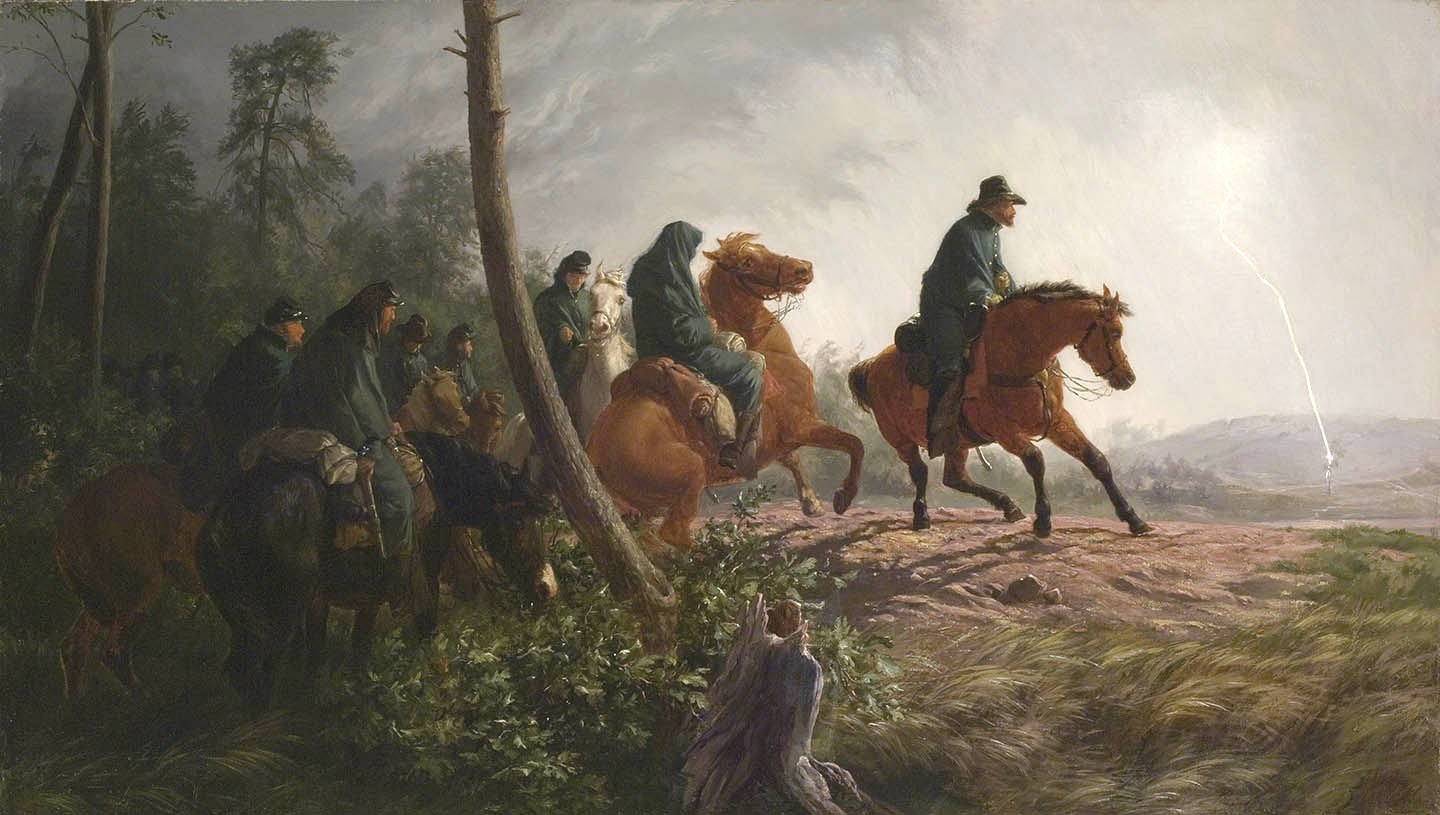
The Union Scout, 1866

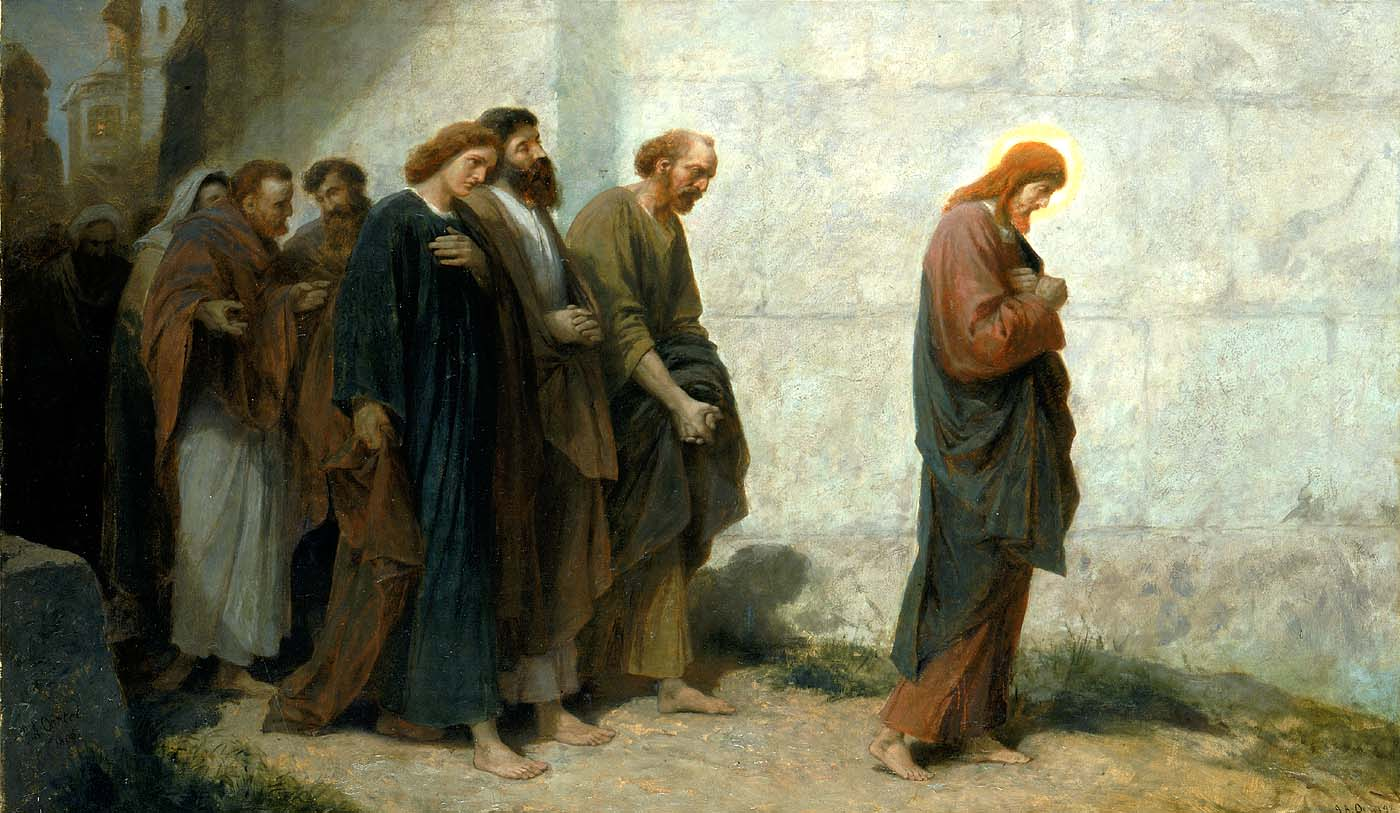
Going Down to Gethsemane, 1898

The Rev. Johannes Oertel served as the priest of St James Episcopal Church in Lenoir, North Carolina, from 1869 to 1874. He was one of the first in the valley to offer a school for African American children, and offered religious services to those recently freed from slavery, including baptism, confirmation, marriage and funeral rites.

The reredos in front of the church is an outstanding example of Oertel's woodworking skills. Made from over 400 pieces of chestnut, oak, poplar, holly, cherry, beech, and pine that were often carved during missionary trips to the Chapel of Rest in Happy Valley, North Carolina and the Chapel of Peace in Witnel, North Carolina, they are carved in Gothic perpendicular style, which was common from the 14th and 16th centuries. Oertel carved other reredos and altar rails, but the one in St. James Episcopal Church is considered to be his most intricate and notable. His altar painting there (1872) is layered oil on canvass with gold gilt, and depicts Jesus administering Holy Communion to male and female communicants.

While at St. James, friends in New York donated to Oertel a 100-year-old pump organ from Christ Episcopal Church in Tarrytown, New York. The organ, dating to about 1770, was the first instrument to enhance the service in Lenoir. Oertel rebuilt the damaged organ, making new pipes, and a new wind chest and bellows. He then carved an illuminated case for the organ works.

By the main church door of the church is Father Time and His Family, (1862, charcoal and pen on paper), which was completed in Westerly, Rhode Island. It depicts Father Time, his wife (the year), and their children (the months). Each child carries an item from the Cornucopia representative of their respective month.

A collection of Oertel's art is held by the church, and includes: The Wandering Jew (1902?, oil on canvas); Capturing Wild Horses (print); Founded Upon a Rock (1900, oil on canvas); Rock of Ages (offset lithography), Man Rowing Out on the Sea of Life With Christ as Pilot (1880, oil on canvas), In Memorium (between 1880 and 1900, oil on canvas board), Christian Hope (1867, oil on canvas), Head of St Paul (oil on canvas, unknown date), Expulsion from the Garden of Eden (1893, oil on canvas), Prophecy of Balaam (1891, monochrome oil on canvas), The Four Evangelists (1884, monochrome oil on canvas), Lament of the Fallen Spirits (1850, oil on canvas), Mary Magdalene at the Cross (ca 1902, oil on canvas), The Good Shepherd (1878, oil on canvas), The Prophet Jeremiah (oil on canvas, unknown date); The King of Truth; (1903, oil on canvas), The Prophet Joel"; The Prophet Ezekiel, The Prophet Isaiah, The Unknown Prophet, and The Dispensation of Promise and the Law (1864-1865, chalk and ink on linen-backed paper).

Oertel had charge of two parishes, both located in Lenoir, North Carolina, until 1876. He relocated a great deal as a priest, spending time in Florida, Maryland, St. Louis, Tennessee, Virginia, and Washington, D.C.

=== Portrait painter ===
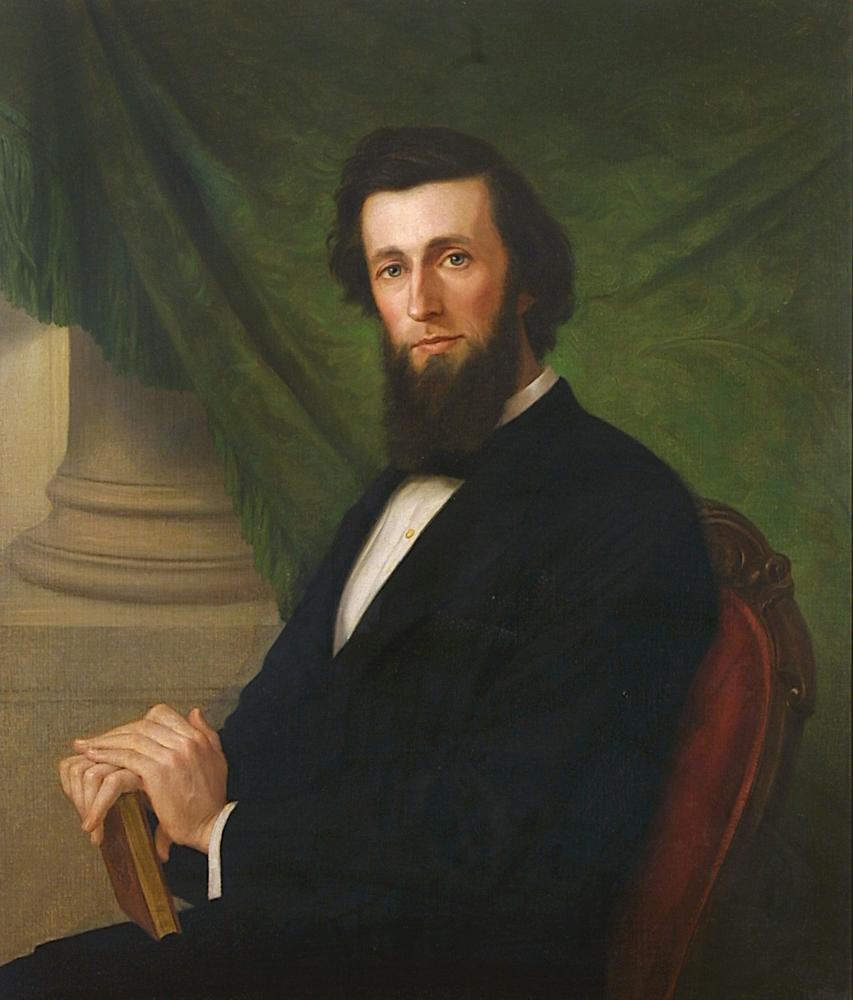
Portrait of the Mayor of Providence, Rhode Island, Mr. Thomas A. Doyle, c. 1869–1871

Oertel was known primarily as a portrait painter. He often left the church in Lenoir, North Carolina, to go north to earn money by painting portraits. Many of his head and bust portraits were popular after the Civil War. He painted portraits for a number of prosperous clients in New England. He painted a portrait of the mayor of Providence, Rhode Island, Thomas A. Doyle as a young man.

Oertel completed a painting of Paul the Apostle, which is held today by St. James Episcopal Church and depicts St. Paul as weary but stern.

=== Academia ===
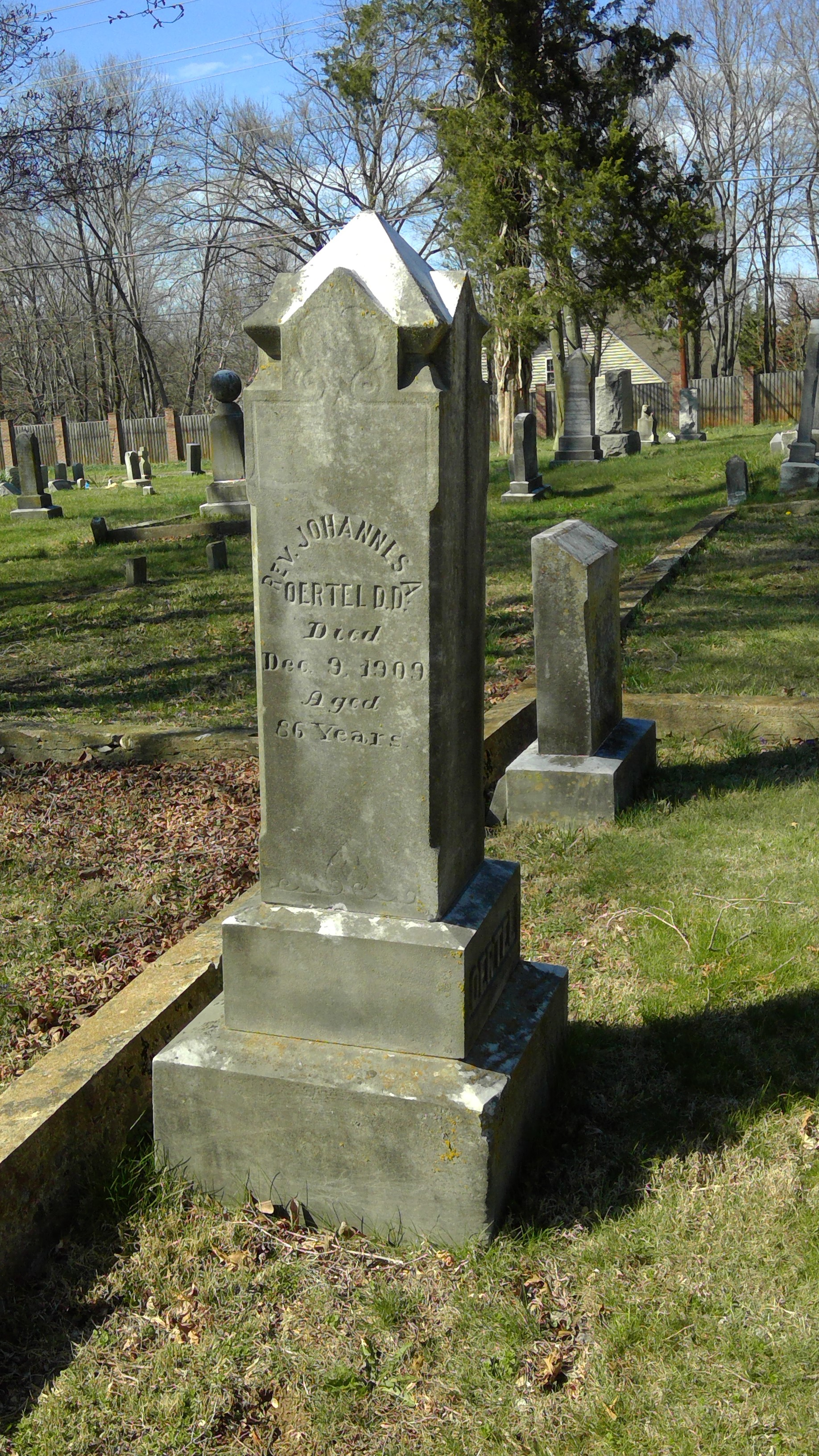
Oertel's grave at Flint Hill Cemetery in Oakton, Virginia

Oertel was an instructor of art at Washington University in St. Louis from 1889 to 1891. He spent the final 18 years of his life in a suburb of Washington, D.C., where he completed many religious paintings and wood carvings. He painted a series of four large pictures, The Plan of Redemption, which he presented to Sewanee in Tennessee, which is now the University of the South. Oertel's last major work was in 1906–07, when he painted and designed the new woodwork for the altarpiece of the Cathedral at Quincy, Illinois.

== Personal life ==
In 1851, Oertel married Julia Adelaide Torrey, and they had four children.

== Death ==
Oertel died on December 9, 1909, in Vienna, Virginia, where he was then living with one of his sons. He is buried in Flint Hill Cemetery in Oakton, Virginia. Collections of his papers are held by the libraries of George Washington University in Washington, D.C., and the University of North Carolina at Chapel Hill in Chapel Hill, North Carolina.

== Bibliography ==
- AskART.Com: Johannes Adam Simon Oertel. n.d. Abstract: AskART.com presents information concerning American artist Johannes Adam Simon Oertel (1823-1909). Additional information for Oertel includes a bibliography of publications about the artist, museum holdings, current exhibits, images of the artist's work, etc. Auction records, including highest prices, are available only to AskART members.
- Edwards, Lee M. 1986. "Johannes Oertel (Attributed to) (1823-1909): Visiting Grandma (Painting)". Domestic Bliss, Family Life in American Painting, 1840–1910.
- Falk, Peter H. 1988. "Oertel, Johannes A.S.". Dictionary of Signatures & Monograms of American Artists, from the Colonial Period to the Mid 20th Century. 313.
- "Father Time and His Family." By Johannes A. Oertel. [New York]: [publisher not identified], 1860. Notes: "On exhibition at Goupil's ..."
- Fielding, Mantle. 1983. "Oertel, Johannes Adam". Mantle Fielding's Dictionary of American Painters, Sculptors & Engravers.
- Herringshaw, Thomas William. 1914. "Oertel, Johannes Adam". Herringshaw's National Library of American Biography : Contains Thirty-Five Thousand Biographies of the Acknowledged Leaders of Life and Thought of the United States; Illustrated with Three Thousand Vignette Portraits.
- Lenoir family. Lenoir Family Papers, Julia Adeliade Torry Oertel. Lenoir Family Papers. 1763. Abstract: Political correspondence includes 1866 letters about freedmen; an 1866 letter about the superiority of the southern female to women in the North; letters, 1866–1873, of William Bingham of the Bingham School; and letters, 1870s-1880s, about the currency question, the African-American exodus northward, and Walter Waightstill Lenoir's 1883 service in the N.C. General Assembly. Business letters relate chiefly to the dealings, beginning around 1867, of Walter Waightstill Lenoir and other family members in land development, especially around Linville, N.C.; specie speculation; silver mining; and agriculture. After Walter's death, Thomas Ballard Lenoir became a prime mover in the Linville Improvement Company. Routine family correspondence accounts for the bulk of the letters, with many items relating to the lives of the women of the family. Included are letters, 1867–1869, about Mary Elizabeth Garrett Lenoir's apparent eating disorder; letters, beginning in September 1877, from Julia Adeliade Torry Oertel, wife of artist and Episcopal clergyman Johannes Adam Simon Oertel; letters of Rufus Theodore Lenoir, Jr., at the Rutherford Military Institute and other schools, and, after 1897, from him and his wife Clyde Lyndon Lenoir in Athens, Ga.; and a letter in 1937 giving a brief history of the Bingham School. Notes: In the Southern Historical Collection, University of North Carolina at Chapel Hill (#426).
- Marks, Arthur S. 1981. "The Statue of King George III in New York and the Iconology of Regicide". American Art Journal / Publ. by Kennedy Galleries. 61–82.
- McWhirter, Michael, W. B. Rogers Beasley, and Johannes Adam Simon Oertel. The Romantic Vision of Johannes Adam Simon Oertel, 1823-1909. Sewanee, Tenn: University Gallery, 1995. Abstract: Presents a short biography of Oertel and influences upon his art. Close-up views of paintings on display in the University Gallery are shown.
- Merrill, Peter C. 1997. "Oertel, Johannes Adam Simon". German Immigrant Artists in America, a Biographical Dictionary.
- The North Carolina Centennial Flag. [Raleigh, N.C.]: [William E. Pell], 1943. Notes: Typed reproduction of article from "The Daily sentinel, Raleigh, North Carolina, Wednesday, July 5, 1876, page 3, column 2"—Leaf [1].
- Oertel, J. F. A Vision Realized; A Life Story of Rev. J.A. Oertel, D.D., Artist, Priest, Missionary. Boston: Christopher Pub. House, 1928. Description: 233 pages; frontispiece (portrait); plates; 23 cm.
- "Johannes Adam Simon Oertel". Brooklyn Museum Libraries & Archives. Schweitzer Gallery files. Notes: The artist file may include any of the following materials: announcements, clippings, photographs, press releases, brochures, reviews, invitations, small exhibition catalogs, résumés, other ephemeral material.
- Oertel, Johannes Adam Simon. Museum of Modern Art (MOMA). Artist file: miscellaneous uncataloged material. n.d. Notes: The folder may include announcements, clippings, press releases, brochures, reviews, invitations, small exhibition catalogs, and other ephemeral material.
- Oertel, Johannes Adam Simon. Johannes Adam Simon Oertel Papers. 1863. Abstract: Diary, 386 p., with entries dated 1868 to 1882, and about sixty enclosures from the diary, including some twenty letters to Oertel and copies of letters from him to others, newspaper clippings, and writings, chiefly poems and sermons, by Oertel and others. Among the topics covered in diary entries are the difficulties Oertel experienced in balancing church duties and the creation of religious art; his poverty; his frustration with an art-buying public that appeared to prefer foreign to American religious art and portraits of themselves and paintings of animals to religious art in general; his annoyance with the art establishment in New York and other major centers and with art agents and publishers; his confrontations with church officials in North Carolina and New York; and his difficulties with parishioners, especially in Morganton. In these entries, there is much about Oertel's efforts to make his family comfortable, but little about the activities of individual family members, except for their involvement in the Orange Springs, Fla., sawmill venture. Few friends and acquaintances are named. Two who were involved in his work were William Cullen Bryant, whose poems Oertel illustrated, and Sarah Rebecca Cameron of Hillsborough, N.C., with whom Oertel was involved in an aborted effort to produce an illustrated volume of religious stories. Notes: In the Southern Historical Collection, University of North Carolina at Chapel Hill (#4592).
- Oertel, Johannes Adam Simon, 1823–1909. Johannes A. Oertel Letter to Samuel Putnam Avery, 1867 May 25. 1867. Metropolitan Museum of Art; Thomas J. Watson Library.
- Oertel, Johannes Adam Simon. Johannes Adam Simon Oertel: [Vertical File]. 1983. Notes: This vertical file may contain exhibition announcements and invitations, small exhibition catalogs, clippings, press releases, brochures, reviews, resumes, and other ephemeral material.
- Oertel, Johannes Adam Simon. Papers. 1857. Abstract: Papers of Johannes Adam Simon Oertel, a painter, primarily of religious subjects, consist of a letter, 1857, discussing boarding houses in Washington, D.C.; and a letter, 1872, to Oertel from William Cullen Bryant, praising his work in illustrating Bryant's poem, "Waiting at the Gate." Duke University Libraries.
- Smithsonian American Art Museum. Going Down to Gethsemane (Title). Smithsonian American Art Museum, Washington, DC, USA. 1920.7.2 Gift of Mr. J. F. Oertel, 1898. Lower right in oil: J.A. OE. 1898; lower left in oil: J.A Oertel/1898; back in oil: Going down to Gethsemane. Johannes A. Oertel./1898.
- Vroom, Steven Michael, and Johannes Adam Simon Oertel. The Romantic Vision of Johannes Adam Simon Oertel, 1823-1909. [Sewanee, Tenn.]: University Gallery of the University of the South, 1995. Notes: Caption title. Catalog of the exhibition held Sept. 24-Dec. 10, 1995. Description: 23 pages: illustrations (some color); 14 x 22 cm.
