= Christ Episcopal Church (Raleigh, North Carolina) =

Historic church in North Carolina, United States

- U.S. National Register of Historic Places
- U.S. National Historic Landmark
- U.S. Historic district – Contributing property
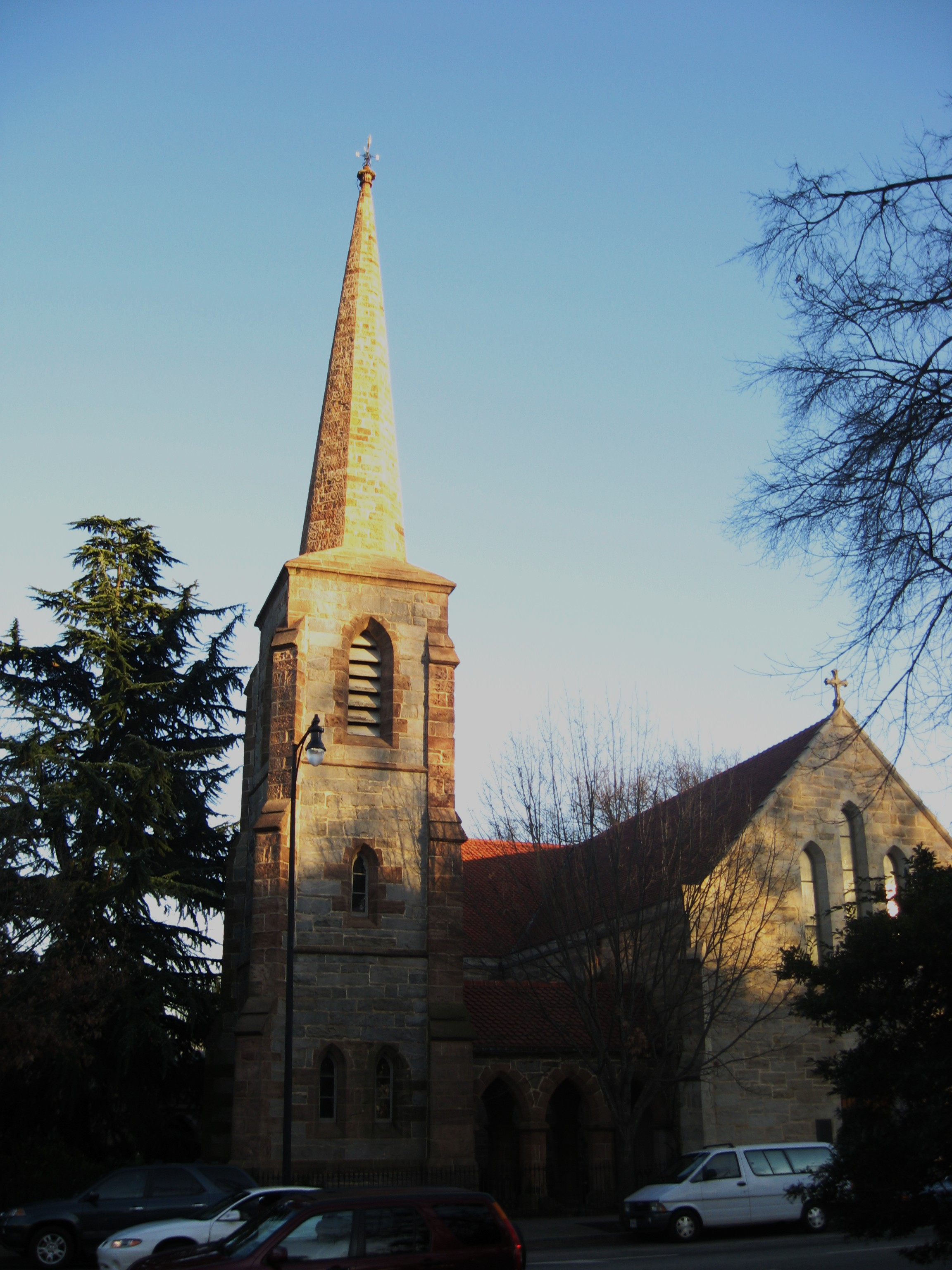
- street view of the church

- Location within North Carolina Location within the United States
- Location: 120 E. Edenton St., Raleigh, North Carolina
- Coordinates: 35°46′51.21″N 78°38′15.04″W
- Built: 1848
- Architect: Richard Upjohn; Hobart Upjohn
- Architectural style: Gothic Revival
- Part of: Capitol Area Historic District (ID78001978)
- NRHP reference No.: 70000469 (original); 87002597 (increase)

Significant dates
- Added to NRHP: July 28, 1970
- Boundary increase: December 23, 1987
- Designated NHL: December 23, 1987
- Designated CP: April 15, 1978

Christ Episcopal Church, also known as Christ Church on Capitol Square, is an Episcopal church at 120 East Edenton Street in Raleigh, North Carolina. Built in 1848–53 to a design by Richard Upjohn, it is one of the first Gothic Revival churches in the American South. The church was built for a parish established in 1821; its minister is the Rev. James P. Adams. It was declared a National Historic Landmark in 1987.

== Description and history ==
Christ Episcopal Church is located within Raleigh's Capitol Area Historic District, just east of the North Carolina State Capitol at the southeast corner of East Edenton and South Wilmington Streets. It is a generally cruciform structure, built predominantly out of rough-cut stone that is varied in color, with dressed stone at the corners and openings. It has a red tile roof that is topped by cruciform finials at the gable ends. The walls are buttressed at the corners, and separating the bays on the long axis. A covered arcade extends north from the west end of the church, joining it to an otherwise-freestanding tower. The tower has three stages, with buttressed corners, and a lancet-louvered belfry in the upper level. It is crowned by a spire and a distinctive bronze weather vane.

The Christ Church parish was organized in 1821, and its first church was a wood-frame structure built in 1829. The present church was designed by Richard Upjohn in 1846, and was consecrated in 1854. At the suggestion of the church's Bishop Levi Silliman Ives, Upjohn based his design on St. Mary's in Burlington, New Jersey, which he had recently completed. The church's parish house with chapel, added in 1913–1914, was designed by Upjohn's grandson Hobart.

The Ravenscroft School, a private K–12 school in Raleigh, was started by members of the church and named after the Episcopal Bishop of the area at that time, John Stark Ravenscroft, who was also the rector of the church.

Olivia Raney served as organist until her death in 1896.

== Notable people ==
- Author Armistead Maupin attended the church with his family as a child.
- Anti-suffragist Mary Hilliard Hinton attended this church.
- NC First Lady Fanny Yarborough Bickett attended this church.
- Socialite Lucile Aycock McKee attended this church.

== Gallery ==
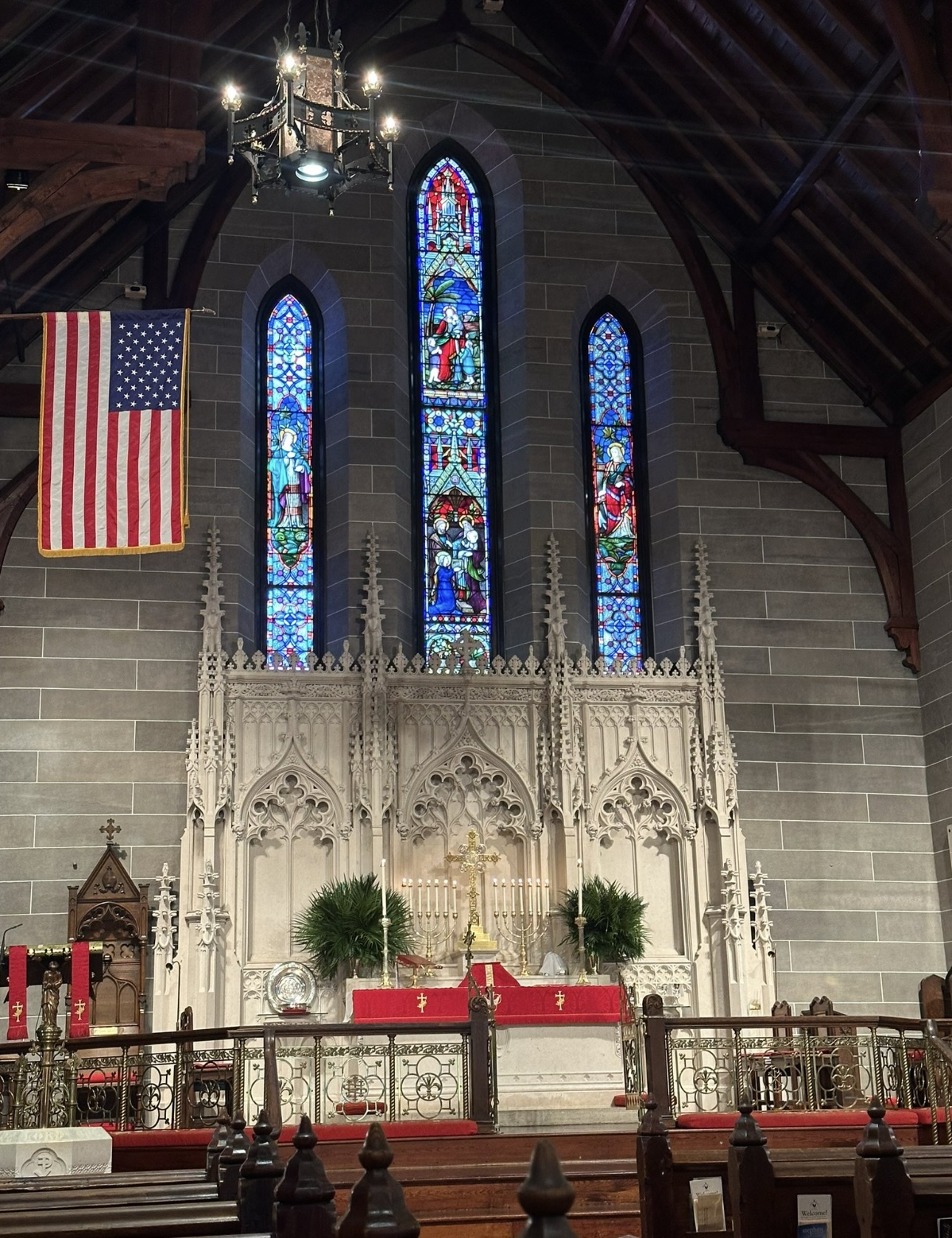
High Altar on Pentecost

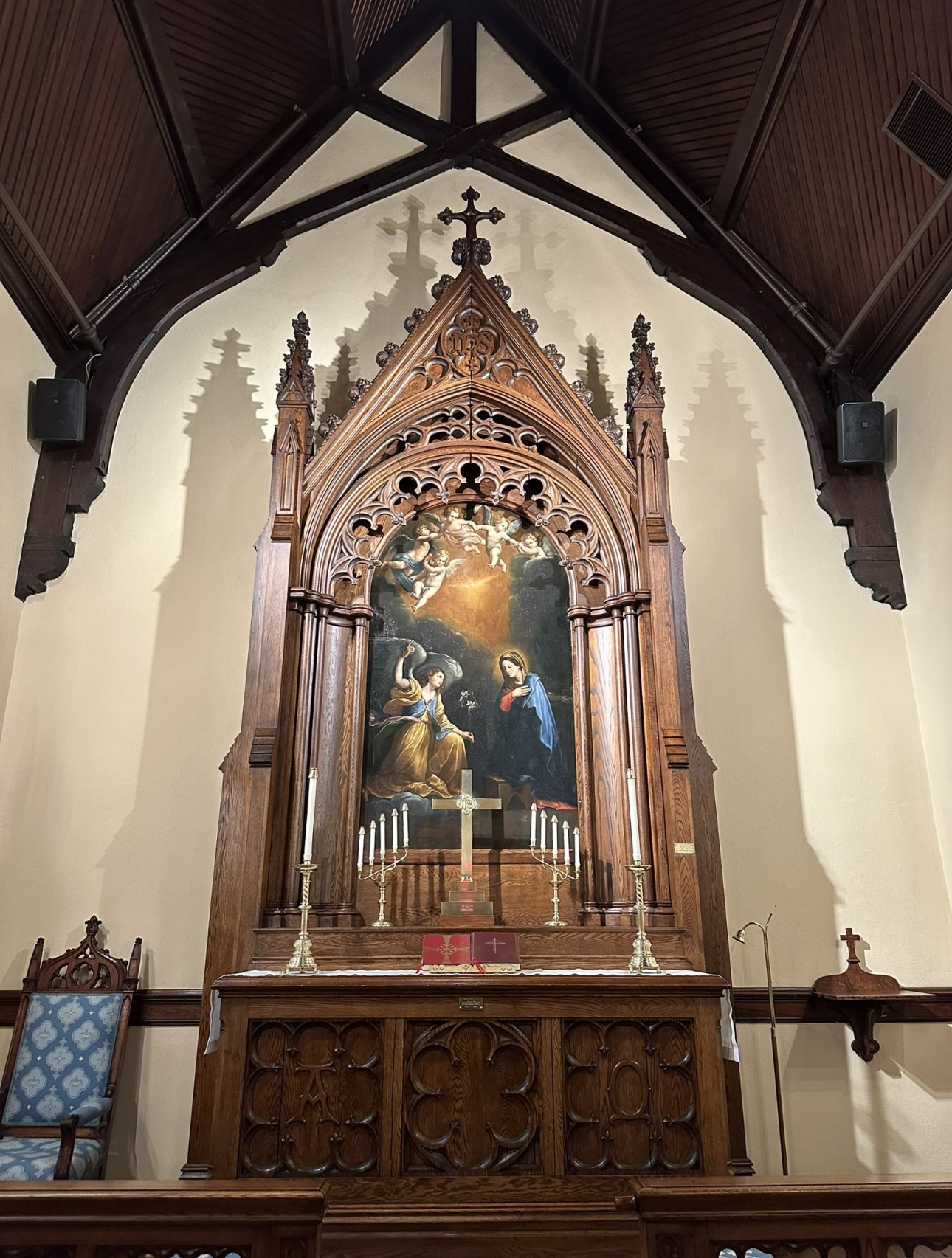
Altar in the Chapel of the Annunciation at Christ Church featuring a painting of the Annunciation to the Virgin Mary

== See also ==
- List of National Historic Landmarks in North Carolina
- National Register of Historic Places listings in Wake County, North Carolina
