= List of plantations in North Carolina =

This is a list of plantations in North Carolina that are National Historic Landmarks, listed on the National Register of Historic Places, listed on a heritage register, or are otherwise significant for their history, association with significant events or people, or their architecture and design.

== Definition of a plantation ==
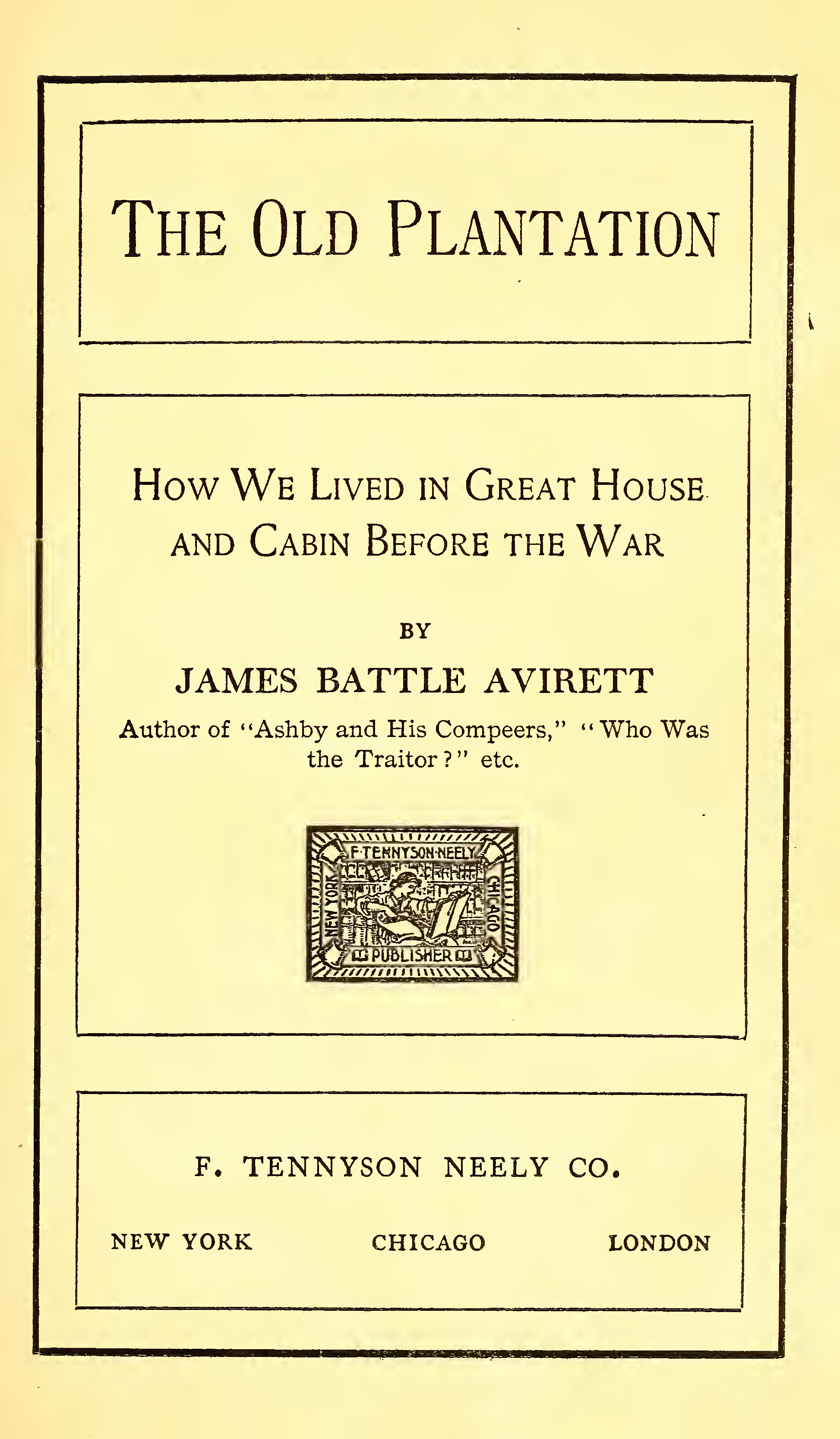
The Old Plantation by James Battle Avirett, 1901

Today, as was also true in the past, there is a wide range of opinion as to what differentiated a plantation from a farm. Typically, the focus of a farm was subsistence agriculture. In contrast, the primary focus of a plantation was the production of cash crops, with enough staple food crops produced to feed the population of the estate and the livestock. A common definition of what constituted a plantation is that it typically had 500 to 1,000 acres (2.0 to 4.0 km^{2}) or more of land and produced one or two cash crops for sale. Other scholars have attempted to define it by the number of slaves that were owned.

== North Carolina plantations ==
The tables of plantations below are sortable, so the name, locality, county (current), historic register number, and built in years can be easily reviewed. References can be found on the individual articles linked or are noted if there are no articles. Comparisons to similar referenced listings are in progress.

Color key	Historic register listing
	National Historic Landmark
	National Register of Historic Places
	Contributing property to a National Register of Historic Places historic district
	Not listed on national or state register

=== Built during the Province of North Carolina period ===
North Carolina plantation were identified by name, beginning in the 17th century. The names of families or nearby rivers or other features were used. The names assisted the owners and local record keepers in keeping track of specific parcels of land. In the early 1900s, there were 328 plantations identified in North Carolina from extant records.

The Sloop Point plantation in Pender County, built in 1729, is the oldest surviving plantation house and the second oldest house surviving in North Carolina, after the Lane House (built in 1718–1719 and not part of a plantation). Sloop Point was once owned by John Baptista Ashe, who was a delegate to the Continental Congress, U.S. Congressman from North Carolina and Continental Army officer.

The known plantations during the period of the Province of North Carolina (1712–1776) are listed in the table below.

NRHP reference number	Name	Image	Date designated	Locality	County	Date built and other notes
72000985	Sloop Point Plantation		January 20, 1972	Sloop Point	Pender	Built in 1729 (circa).
71000615	Newbold-White Plantation		June 24, 1971	Hertford	Perquimans	Built in 1730 by Abraham Sanders
76001305	Belfont Plantation House		December 12, 1976	Latham; 35°37′6″N 77°8′14″W	Beaufort	Built 1700–1799, Burned 10 Jan 2024 https://www.wnct.com/local-news/washington/fire-destroys-historic-plantation-home-in-beaufort-county/
73001294	Orton Plantation		April 11, 1973	Smithville Township; 34°3′38″N 77°56′47″W	Brunswick	Built in 1735. Owner: Roger Moore (1694–1751)
72000961	Old Town Plantation		January 20, 1972	Battleboro; 35°58′54″N 77°43′52″W	Edgecombe	Built in 1742 (circa).
73001318	Clear Springs Plantation		March 14, 1973	Jasper; 35°12′57″N 77°12′3″W	Craven	Built in 1740.
Unknown Status	Turkey Branch Plantation (The Lilacs)		NA	Turkey; 34°59′35″N 78°11′3″W	Duplin	Built in 1730s (late) by Thomas Kenan (1700–1765), the father of James Kenan
73001371	Ashland		March 14, 1973	Henderson; 36°25′55″N 78°22′09″W	Vance	Built in 1740 (circa) by Samuel Henderson
79001720	White Rock Plantation		February 14, 1979	Hollister; 36°17′40″N 77°55′25″W	Halifax	Built in 1750–1799.
76001316	Greenfield Plantation (Fordice's)		May 6, 1976	Somer, near Somerset; 36°3′13″N 76°26′33″W	Chowan	Built in 1752, 1840. Original owner: Levi Creecy (d.1772)
	Green Hill			Hillsborough	Orange	Built in 1750 by Charles Wilson Johnston
97001561	Potts Plantation		January 5, 1998	Cornelius; 35°28′45″N 80°50′13″W	Mecklenburg	Built in 1753.
71000570	King House		August 26, 1971	Windsor; 36°1′49″N 77°1′9″W	Bertie	Built in 1763 by William King.
	Lipscomb House			Durham	Durham	Built in 1775 by Joseph Brittain
73001329	Oak Grove Plantation		February 6, 1973	Godwin (near Erwin); 35°15′0″N 78°41′25″W	Cumberland	Built in 1764 (circa).
79001711	Abrams Plains Plantation		November 29, 1979	Stovall; 36°28′58″N 78°30′51″W	Granville	Built in 1766 by Samuel Smith.
70000462	House in the Horseshoe (Alston House)		February 26, 1970	Carthage; 35°28′1.6″N 79°23′0.5″W	Moore	Built in 1772 by Philip Alston
Family history	Gilreath Plantation			Gilreath	Wilkes	Built in 1776 (circa). Over 600+ acres, later home to George Allen Gilreath.
70000472	Joel Lane House		July 28, 1970	Raleigh	Wake	Built in 1769
	Mulberry Island Plantation			Stoneville	Rockingham	Built by Nathaniel Scales
	Patterson Plantation			Durham	Orange	Built in 1770 by John Patterson

=== Built from 1776 to 1863 ===
The following table shows the plantations in North Carolina that were built between 1776 and the end of the Civil War.

NRHP reference number	Name	Image	Date designated	Locality	County	Date built and other notes
	Adelphia Plantation			Tarboro; 35°50′15″N 77°37′18.5″W	Edgecombe	Built in 1854 by J. J. Garrett
75001266	Archibald H. Davis Plantation		July 24, 1975	Justice; 36°03′12″N 78°11′45″W	Franklin	Built in 1820 (about).
02001718	William T. Alexander House		January 15, 2003	Charlotte; 35°19′23″N 80°44′5″W	Mecklenburg	Built in 1820–1830
93001132	Alston-DeGraffenried Plantation		November 18, 1974	Pittsboro; 35°43′59″N 79°14′36″W	Chatham	Built in 1810–1825.
98001506	Andrews-Moore House		December 10, 1998	Bunn; 36°0′9″N 78°11′14″W	Franklin	Built in 1790 (circa), 1830 (circa)
82003441	Aspen Hall		July 29, 1982	Pittsboro; 35°44′2″N 79°16′24″W	Chatham	Built in 1790s.
91000465	Avirett–Stephens Plantation		April 18, 1991	Richlands; 34°51′04″N 77°32′07″W	Onslow	Built in 1851. Owner: John Alfred Alvirett
71000606	Ayr Mount		August 26, 1971	Hillsborough	Orange	Built in 1815 (circa).
79001735	Beaver Dam Plantation House		March 19, 1979	Davidson; 35°28′32″N 80°49′4″W	Mecklenburg	Built in 1829.
89002132	Bellemonte House		December 21, 1989	Rocky Mount; 36°0′56″N 77°46′17″W	Nash	Built in 1817 by John F. Bellamy
82003495	Belvidere Plantation House		June 14, 1982	Hampstead; 34°23′5″N 77°38′51″W	Pender	Built in 1810 (about).
86000157	Bennett Bunn Plantation		February 4, 1986	Zebulon; 35°50′14″N 78°16′59″W	Wake	Built in 1833.
80002898	The Boxwoods		May 28, 1980	Madison	Rockingham	Built in 1815 (circa).
71000579, 05001412	Bracebridge Hall		February 18, 1971, December 16, 2005 (Boundary Increase)	Tarboro	Edgecombe	Built between 1830 and 1832. Home of Governor Elias Carr and First Lady Eleanor Kearny Carr.
70000480	Buck Spring Plantation		October 15, 1970	Vaughan; 36°28′50″N 77°59′52″W	Warren	Built in 1781 (circa). Home of Nathaniel Macon.
71000621	Burnside Plantation House		April 16, 1971	Williamsboro; 36°26′02″N 78°27′45″W	Vance	Built in 1800 (about).
16000561	Burt-Arrington House		August 22, 2016	Nashville	Nash	Built circa 1824
80002881	Perciphul Campbell Plantation		December 8, 1980	Union Grove; 36°02′32.6″N 80°50′35″W	Iredell	Built in 1820 (about) by Perciphull Campbell
70000843	Carson House		September 15, 1970	Marion	McDowell	Built in 1797 by John Carson.
	Carter Plantation			Wentworth	Rockingham	Built in 1782 by Thomas Carter III
75001288	Cascade Plantation (Willow Oaks Farm)		October 14, 1975	Eden; 36°31′22″N 79°39′29″W	Rockingham	Built in 1830s. Original owner: William Edward Broadnax
72000976	Cedar Grove Plantation		February 1, 1972	Huntersville; 35.394444°N 80.898611°W	Mecklenburg	Built in 1831. The home of James G. Torrance
	Deep Springs Plantation			Stoneville	Rockingham	Built in 1827 by James Madison Scales
70000481	Somerset Place Plantation		February 26, 1970	Creswell; 35°47′16.84″N 76°24′18.38″W	Washington	Built in 1830. Contained more than two thousand acres of farmland, 125,000 acres of forests.
73001334	Cooleemee		June 2, 1978	Mocksville; 35.85340°N 80.41000°W	Davie	Built in 1853–1855 by Peter and Columbia Stuart Hairston.
71000581	Coolmore Plantation		June 2, 1978	Tarboro; 35.92389°N 77.59444°W	Edgecombe	Built in 1858–1861.
80002897	Covington Plantation House		May 28, 1980	Rockingham, North Carolina; 34°53′49″N 79°48′13″W	Richmond	Built in 1850 (about).
74001344	Ellerslie Plantation		August 7, 1974	Fayetteville; 35°13′50″N 78°52′31″W	Cumberland	Built in 1790–1801 by George Elliot.
72000963	Elmwood Plantation		February 1, 1972	Gatesville; 36°23′38″N 76°41′58″W	Gates	Built in 1822.
73001337	Fairntosh Plantation		April 3, 1973	Durham; 36°5′56″N 78°49′42″W	Durham	Built in 1800.
73001353	Farmville Plantation (Darshana Hall)		June 19, 1973	Elmwood area near Statesville; 35.739444°N 80.765°W	Iredell	Built in 1818. Owner: Joseph Chambers (1791–1848); Built in 1753 by John McElwarth
79003349	Fewell-Reynolds House		July 16, 1979	Madison	Rockingham	Built in 1820 (circa).
98000197	Foscue and Simmons Plantations		October 7, 1998	Pollocksville; 35°02′21″N 77°12′01″W	Jones	Built in 1820-1825 (about)
71000598	Foscue Plantation House		November 19, 1971	Pollocksville; 35°2′16″N 77°17′26″W	Jones	Built in 1801.
72000996	Fox Haven Plantation		September 14, 1972	Rutherfordton; 35°20′53″N 82°3′13″W	Rutherford	Built in 1823.
04001390	William Wright Faison House		December 23, 2004	Bowdens	Duplin	Built in 1830
82003425	Garrett White House		June 28, 1982	Colerain; 36°12′44.95″N 76°52′58.11″W	Bertie	Built in 1780 or 1785 by Jesse Garrett
74001370	Green River Plantation		March 28, 1974	Columbus; 35°17′12″N 82°01′06″W	Polk	Built in 1807.
71000616	Grimesland Plantation		March 31, 1971	Grimesland; 35°33′22″N 77°10′02″W	Pitt	Built in 1790 (circa).
72000960	Hardscrabble		January 20, 1972	Bahama	Durham	Built in 1779
71000588	Hare Plantation House		February 18, 1971	Como; 36°30′21″N 77°2′22″W	Hertford	Built in 1815 (circa).
07001504	Harmony Plantation		January 29, 2008	Wendell; 35°51′54″N 78°26′38″W	Wake	Built in 1833.
74001341	Hayes Plantation		November 7, 1973	Edenton; 36.04818°N 76.60222°W	Chowan	Built in 1814–1817. 3000+ Slaves
96000186	Herbert Akins Plantation			Fuquay-Varina	Wake	Built in 1863 (before). Burned down during Civil War
82003427	Hermitage		June 8, 1982	Merry Hill; 36°5′12″N 76°44′0″W	Bertie	Built in 1700s (late). Owners: Alexander W. Mebane (1800–1847) and Augustus Holley (1820–1882)
74001373	High Rock Farm		April 26, 1974	Gibsonville	Guilford	Built in the early 1800s.
72000977	Holly Bend Plantation		3/24/1972	Huntersville	Mecklenburg	Built in 1795–1800.
70000441	Hope Plantation		April 17, 1970	Windsor; 36°10′39″N 77°1′9″W	Bertie	Built in 1803. Owner: David Stone
88002608	Humphrey–Williams Plantation		July 24, 1973	Lumberton; 34°42′8″N 79°3′41″W	Robeson	Built in 1784, 1846.
75001275	Johnson-Neel Plantation		June 20, 1975	Mooresville	Iredell	Built in 1830 (circa).
73001376	Crabtree Jones House		June 4, 1973	Raleigh; 35°49′20″N 78°37′26″W	Wake	Built in 1795 by Nathaniel "Crabtree" Jones, Jr.
88001264	John P. Lawrence Plantation		August 31, 1988	Grissom	Granville	Built in 1845 (circa)
16000880	Dr. Calvin Jones House		December 20, 2016	Wake Forest	Wake	Built in 1820 (circa)
72000978	Latta Plantation		March 16, 1972	Huntersville	Mecklenburg	Built in 1800 (circa).
75001257	Leigh Farm		September 5, 1975	Chapel Hill	Durham	Built in 1834 (circa)
Unknown Status	Liberty Hall		NA	Kenansville; 34.9599°N 77.9652°W	Duplin	Built in 1749–1799 by James Kenan, father of Thomas S. Kenan
75001269	Locust Grove		November 20, 1975	Ingleside	Franklin	Built in 1790 (circa)
72000995	Alexander Long Plantation		February 1, 1972	Spencer; 35°42′10″N 80°25′13″W	Rowan	Built in 1783.
76001312	Longwood Plantation		September 15, 1976	Milton; 36°31′40″N 79°13′10″W	Caswell	Built in 1810, 1833, 1855 (circa); destroyed in 2013
84000071	Lower Sauratown Plantation		May 24, 1984	Eden	Rockingham	Built in 1825 (circa).
75001270	Massenburg Plantation		July 30, 1975	Louisburg; 36°7′6″N 78°16′8″W	Franklin	Built in 1820 (circa).
72000964	Richard Mendenhall Plantation Buildings		November 3, 1972	Jamestown; 35°59′34″N 79°56′56″W	Guilford	Built in 1811.
07000543	Midway Plantation House and Outbuildings		January 6, 1987	Knightdale; 35°49′24.60″N 78°29′39.25″W	Wake	Built in 1848.
83001904	Mills-Screven Plantation		February 17, 1983	Tryon; 35°13′20″N 82°15′4″W	Tryon	Built in 1820–1840.
70000474	Mordecai House		July 1, 1970	Raleigh; 35°47′33.27″N 78°38′0.14″W	Wake	Built in 1785
74001354	Mount Mourne Plantation		October 29, 1974	Mooresville; 35.538611°N 80.849444°W	Iredell	Built in 1836 by Rufus Reid
98000689	Oakforest		June 11, 1998	Wake Forest	Wake	Built in 1807
72000924	Oakland Plantation		April 25, 1972	Carvers	Bladen	Built in 1780.
80002829	Oakland Plantation		April 2, 1980	Tarboro; 35°53′47″N 77°32′27″W	Edgecombe	Built in 1850 (mid 1800s).
93001021	Oaky Grove Plantation		September 30, 1993	Shotwell; 35°44′24.80″N 78°26′24.63″W	Wake	Built in 1818.
91000359	Historic Oak View		April 3, 1991	Raleigh	Wake	Built in 1855.
79003338	Palo Alto Plantation		October 10, 1979	Palopato	Onslow	Built in 1836–1840.
75001263	Dr. Samuel Perry House		June 5, 1975	Gupton; 36°11′52″N 78°9′6″W	Franklin	Built in 1857.
NCPEDIA	Poplar Grove Plantation			Scott's Hill (Wilmington); 34°19′13″N 77°45′55″W	Onslow County, North Carolina	Built in 1792 (before) and owned by Cornelius Harnett and wife
79003346	Poplar Grove		July 16, 1979	Scott's Hill (Wilmington); 34°19′13″N 77°45′55″W	Onslow County, North Carolina	Built in 1850 (circa) by Joseph M. Foy
	Poplar Hill			Hillsborough	Orange	Built in 1794 by James Hogg
78001977	Pool Rock Plantation		November 29, 1978	Williamsboro; 36°27′17″N 78°25′4″W	Vance	Built in 1827.
74001381	Powell House		Wake Forest	Wake	Built in 1800 (circa)	
	Pullen House			Raleigh	Wake	Built in the early 1800s.
76001329	Puppy Creek Plantation		December 12, 1976	Rockfish; 35°1′15″N 79°7′45″W	Hoke	Built in 1821 (circa).
88000238	Purefoy–Dunn Plantation		March 24, 1988	Wake Forest; 35°57′32″N 78°32′19″W	Wake	Built in 1814 (circa).
73001298	Quaker Meadows		October 3, 1973	Morganton (near); 35°45′26″N 81°43′15″W	Burke	Built in 1799 (before) by Joseph McDowell Jr.
User supplied	Quewhiffle Plantation		NA	Magnolia	Sampson	Built in 1837 by Patrick Murphy.
08001365	Robinson Rock Plantation		January 22, 2009	Charlotte; 35°15′41″N 80°42′27″W	Mecklenburg	Built in 1780-1810 (circa). Historic archaeological site.
82003492	Rose Hill		April 28, 1982	Nashville	Nash	Built in the late 18th-century
88000409	Marcus Royster Plantation		April 28, 1988	Wilbourns; 36°28′16″N 78°43′40″W	Granville	Built in 1850 (circa).
74001342	Shelton Plantation House		October 29, 1974	Edenton; 36°4′56″N 76°37′47″W	Chowan	Built in 1820 (circa).
73001338	Stagville Plantation		May 25, 1973	Durham; 36.116933°N 78.837781°W	Durham	Built in 1787–1799; Seat of largest plantation complex in NC
01001132	Archibald Taylor Plantation House		October 20, 2001	Oxford; 36°19′18″N 78°32′31″W	Granville	Built in 1840.
74001369	Waverly Plantation		October 9. 1974	Cunningham; 36°32′20″N 79°04′44″W	Person	Built in 1830 (circa).
80002866	Wood Lawn Plantation		November 24, 1980	near Mount Mourne; 35.518056°N 80.834722°W	Iredell	Built in 1836 by Dr. George Washington Stinson.
86000420	Woodside Plantation		March 6, 1986	Milton; 36°31′32″N 79°11′2″W	Caswell	Built in 1838
78001966	White Oak Plantation		February 7, 1978	Charlotte; 35°14′54″N 80°41′26″W	Mecklenburg	Built in 1792.
88000418	Lewis Wimbish Plantation		April 28, 1988	Grassy Creek; 36°31′21″N 78°35′22″W	Granville	Built in 1850 (circa).
73001351	Lebanon Plantation House		January 29, 1973	Near Erwin; 35°15′35″N 78°40′17″W	Harnett	Built in 1824 (circa).
Preservation NC	Ashwood Plantation (William T. Smith House)			Godwin	Cumberland	Built in 1835 (circa).
05001030	Thompson House		September 15, 2005	Wake Forest	Wake	Built in 1853 (circa)
74001378	Wakefields		October 16, 1974	Wake Forest	Wake	Built in 1831 (circa)
	Walnut Hall			Bahama	Durham	Built in 1845 by Willie Person Mangum
82003504	Wood Grove Plantation		September 23, 1982	Bear Poplar; 35°40′48″N 80°40′28″W	Rowan	Built in 1825 (circa) by Thomas Cowan (1748–1817) and Abel Cowan (1789–1843)
User Supplied	Ardnave		N/A	Manchester	Cumberland	Built 1825. Home of Daniel McDiarmid. Burned in the 1960s.

=== Plantations built after the civil war ===
Some plantations were built after the civil war and abolition of slavery.

NRHP reference number	Name	Image	Date designated	Locality	County	Date built and other notes
93000235	Chinqua Penn Plantation		April 8, 1993	Reidsville; 36°23′4″N 79°42′0″W	Rockingham	Built in 1920s by Thomas Jefferson Penn.

== Notable plantation owners ==
The following persons were large plantation owners for which the plantation has not yet been identified.

- John Dillard Bellamy, Sr: owned plantations in North and South Carolina, including Grovely Plantation "an almost ten thousand acre" produce plantation on Town Creek in Brunswick County and Grist Plantation, a turpentine plantation in Columbus County, near Chadbourn, North Carolina.
- John H. Wheeler: (1806–1882) was an American planter, slaveowner, attorney, politician and historian who served as North Carolina State Treasurer (1843–1845) and as United States Minister to Nicaragua (1855–1856)
- William Lenoir: (May 8, 1751 – May 6, 1839) was an American Revolutionary War officer and prominent statesman in late 18th-century and early 19th-century North Carolina.

== See also ==
- History of slavery in North Carolina
- Plantation complexes in the Southern United States
- List of plantations in the United States

Originally form Virginia the J.A. Evans Family moved from Edgecombe County, N.C. through Nash County, N.C. to Pine Level in Johnston County, N.C. in 1850 A.D. and started a farm which eventually through land purchases became the 6,000 acre Tall Pines Plantation, Founded in 1870 A.D. by Jane Barns Evans widow of J.A. Evans CSA. The family lost control of the property in 1938 A.D. after the Great Financial Depression and gained some compensation for the land through legal action taking by the Evans family in 1947 A.D. Descendants of the J.A. Evans Family in 2020 A.D. were still living in the Pine Level area.

Jane Barnes Evans was a cotton Baroness and part owner of the North Carolina Railroad which ran through part of her Tall Pines Plantation which supplied fresh water to the North Carolina Railroad for the use of steam engine locomotives.
