= Walnut Hill Historic District =

Walnut Hill Historic District may refer to:

- Walnut Hill Historic District (Carnesville, Georgia), listed on the NRHP in Georgia
- Walnut Hill Historic District (Knightdale, North Carolina), listed on the NRHP in North Carolina
