= Wake Forest Historic District =

Historic district in North Carolina, United States

- U.S. National Register of Historic Places
- U.S. Historic district
- Location within North Carolina Location within the United States
- Location: Bounded by Oak St., RR tracks, Holding St., W. Vernon Ave., S. Wingate, N. Wingate, Durham Rd. and N. College Sts., Wake Forest, North Carolina
- Coordinates: 35°58′55″N 78°30′44″W
- Area: 246 acres (100 ha)
- Built: 1834
- Architect: Barrett, Charles W.; et.al.
- Architectural style: Federal, Greek Revival
- MPS: Wake County MPS
- NRHP reference No.: 03001301
- Added to NRHP: December 18, 2003

Wake Forest Historic District is a national historic district located at Wake Forest, Wake County, North Carolina. The district encompasses 245 contributing buildings, one contributing site, and five contributing structures built between about 1890 and 1953 and located in the historic core of the town of Wake Forest. It includes notable examples of Greek Revival and Federal style architecture. Located in the district are the separately listed Lea Laboratory, South Brick House, and the Powell-White House, a contributing resource in the Glen Royall Mill Village Historic District. Other notable buildings include the historic campus of Wake Forest College, Wake Forest Baptist Church (1913), Magnolia Hill (1928), Calvin Jones House (circa 1820), John M. Brewer House (circa 1860), Wait-Taylor House (1843), Taylor-Purefoy-Poteat-Swett House (circa 1840), Community House (circa 1942), St. Catherine of Siena Catholic Church (now Hope Lutheran Church, circa 1940), the Powers Store (1897), and former Water and Light Building (1909).

The district was listed on the National Register of Historic Places in 2003.
