= Walnut Hill Cotton Gin =

- U.S. National Register of Historic Places
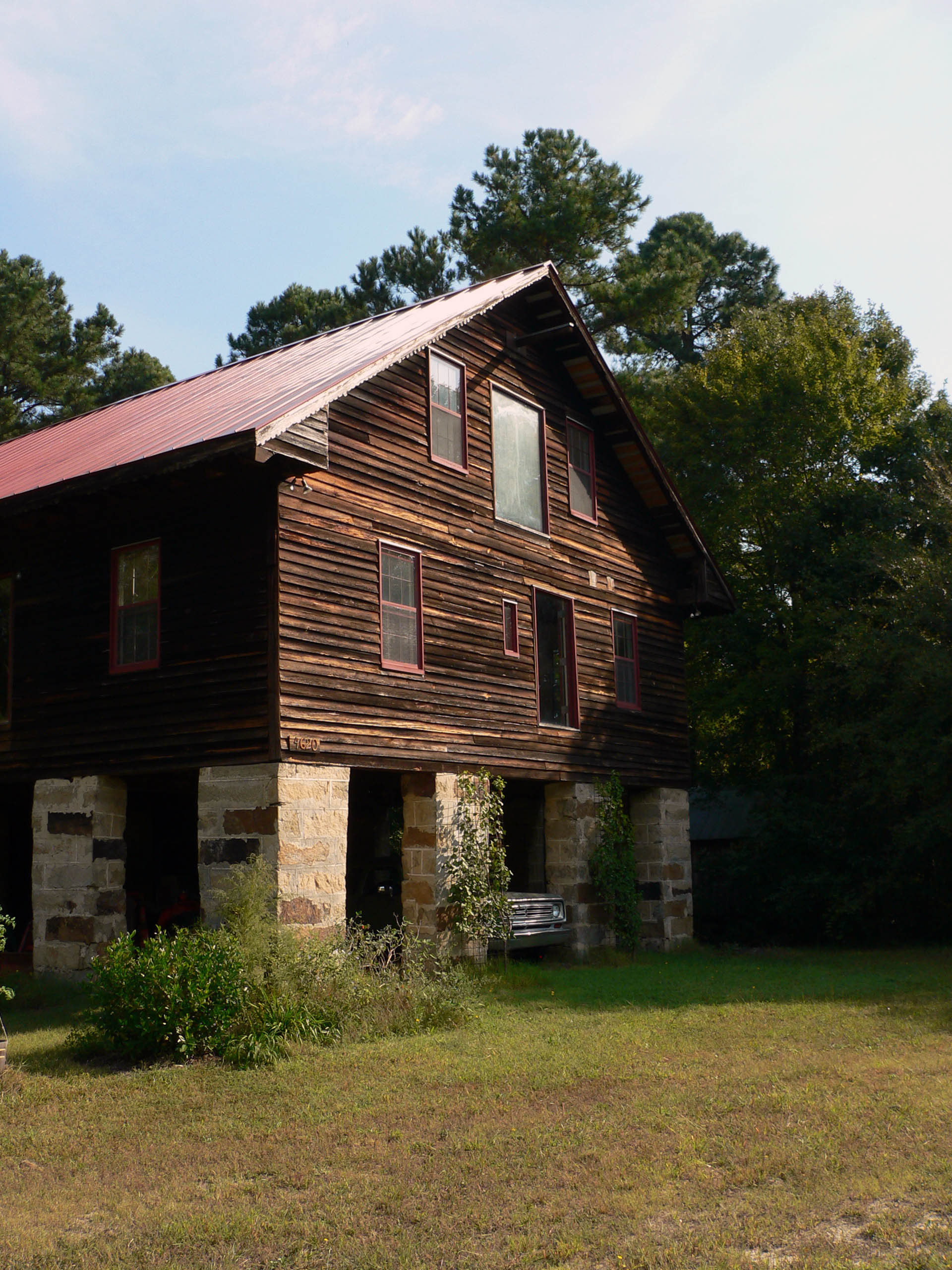

- Location within North Carolina Location within the United States
- Location: 4620 Mial Plantation Road, Knightdale, North Carolina
- Nearest city: Shotwell, North Carolina
- Coordinates: 35°44′24.80″N 78°26′24.63″W
- Area: 0.5 acres (0.20 ha)
- Built: c. 1848
- MPS: Wake County MPS
- NRHP reference No.: 86001631
- Added to NRHP: August 14, 1986

The Walnut Hill Plantation cotton gin house was built in the mid to late 1840s by Alonzo T. Mial, a prominent planter and commission merchant in 19th century North Carolina. It is one of a few surviving cotton gin houses in the state, and is likely the only one to have retained the majority of its original ginning equipment.

The gin house is a 2 1/2-story-tall, hand-hewn timber frame structure, approximately 36 feet (11 m) wide and 56 feet (17 m) deep. The frontmost two-thirds of the structure is supported by tall, 2 feet (0.61 m) thick granite ashlar pillars that form a square, open-air space on the ground floor in which the mule track and power shaft were located. The rear third of the gin house rests on short, granite rubble piers, and housed the ground-floor pressing and packaging rooms. Most of the ginning equipment resided on the second floor of the gin house. The third floor was used for storage of baled cotton.

The gin was originally powered by two to four mules hitched to horizontal sweeps that turned the vertical power shaft. The power shaft was connected to a series of cog wheels that ultimately transferred power to the leather belt that drove the gin. In 1875, Mial replaced the mules with a 15-horsepower steam engine, which considerably increased the gin's production capacity. The gin house received a number of other upgrades as ginning technology progressed over the following fifty years. The Walnut Hill cotton gin ceased operation in the mid-1930s, shortly after the death of Millard Mial, Alonzo T. Mial's oldest son.

== Renovation ==
Architect Jim Smith, of HagerSmith Design, PA in Raleigh, and his wife purchased the gin house in 1992 and spent the following decade stabilizing the structure to halt its deterioration. Between 2003 and 2005, they renovated the gin house and converted it to a private residence, where they have lived since. Their work won them an AIA North Carolina Design Merit award in 2011.

== See also ==
- Walnut Hill Historic District
- List of Registered Historic Places in North Carolina
