= Lea Laboratory =

- U.S. National Register of Historic Places
- U.S. Historic district – Contributing property
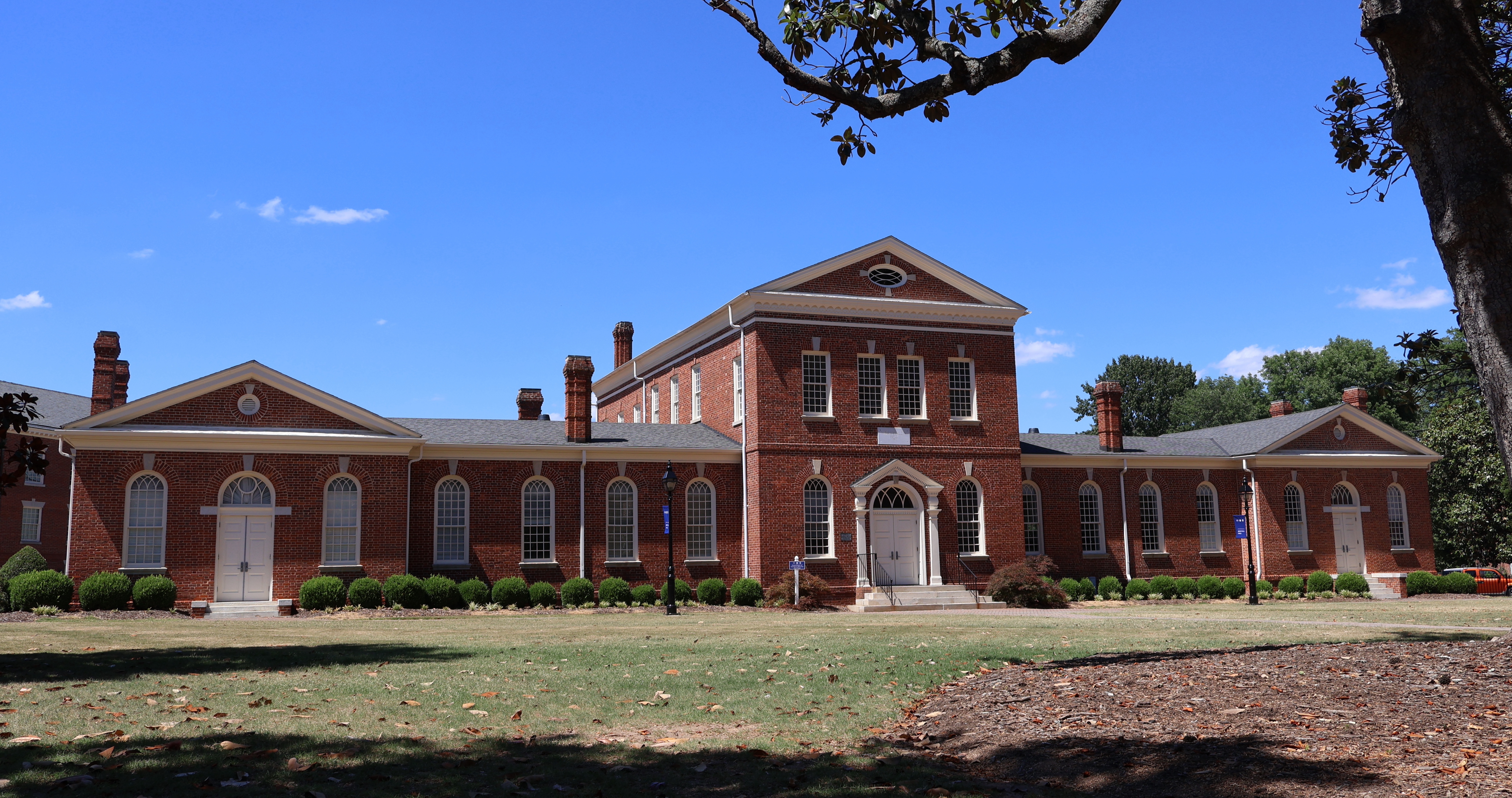
- Pictured in 2026

- Location within North Carolina Location within the United States
- Location: Southeastern Baptist Theological Seminary campus, Wake Forest, North Carolina
- Coordinates: 35°58′52″N 78°30′42″W
- Area: 10 acres (4.0 ha)
- Built: 1887-1888
- Architect: Wilson, John Appleton
- Architectural style: Colonial Revival, Victorian
- NRHP reference No.: 75001298
- Added to NRHP: May 29, 1975

Lea Laboratory is a historic laboratory building located on the original campus of Wake Forest College (now Wake Forest University) at Wake Forest, North Carolina. It was designed by noted Baltimore architect John Appleton Wilson (1851–1927) and built in 1887–1888. It consists of a two-story pedimented central brick block, three bays wide and seven deep flanked by one-story pedimented brick wings. The building has a blend of Colonial Revival and Victorian design elements. It is the oldest remaining building on the original campus of Wake Forest University, now Southeastern Baptist Theological Seminary, and was one of the first chemical laboratories constructed on a Southern college campus.

It was listed on the National Register of Historic Places in 1975. It is located in the Wake Forest Historic District.
