= Riddick House (Como, North Carolina) =

Historic house in North Carolina, United States

- U.S. National Register of Historic Places
- Location within North Carolina Location within the United States
- Location: 1 mile (1.6 km) south of the junction of SR 1319 and 1322, near Como, North Carolina
- Coordinates: 36°31′46″N 76°56′25″W
- Area: 0.5 acres (0.20 ha)
- Built: c. 1825
- Architect: Abram Riddick
- Architectural style: Greek Revival, Federal, Vernacular Federal
- NRHP reference No.: 71000589
- Added to NRHP: February 18, 1971

Riddick House is a historic plantation house located near Como, Hertford County, North Carolina. It is dated to about 1795, and is a three-story, five-bay, L-shaped Federal style frame dwelling with a two-story Greek Revival style rear addition. It is sheathed in weatherboard, sits on a brick foundation, and has two double-shouldered brick chimneys on each gable end.

It was listed on the National Register of Historic Places in 1971.
