= South Brick House =

Historic house in North Carolina, United States

- U.S. National Register of Historic Places
- U.S. Historic district – Contributing property
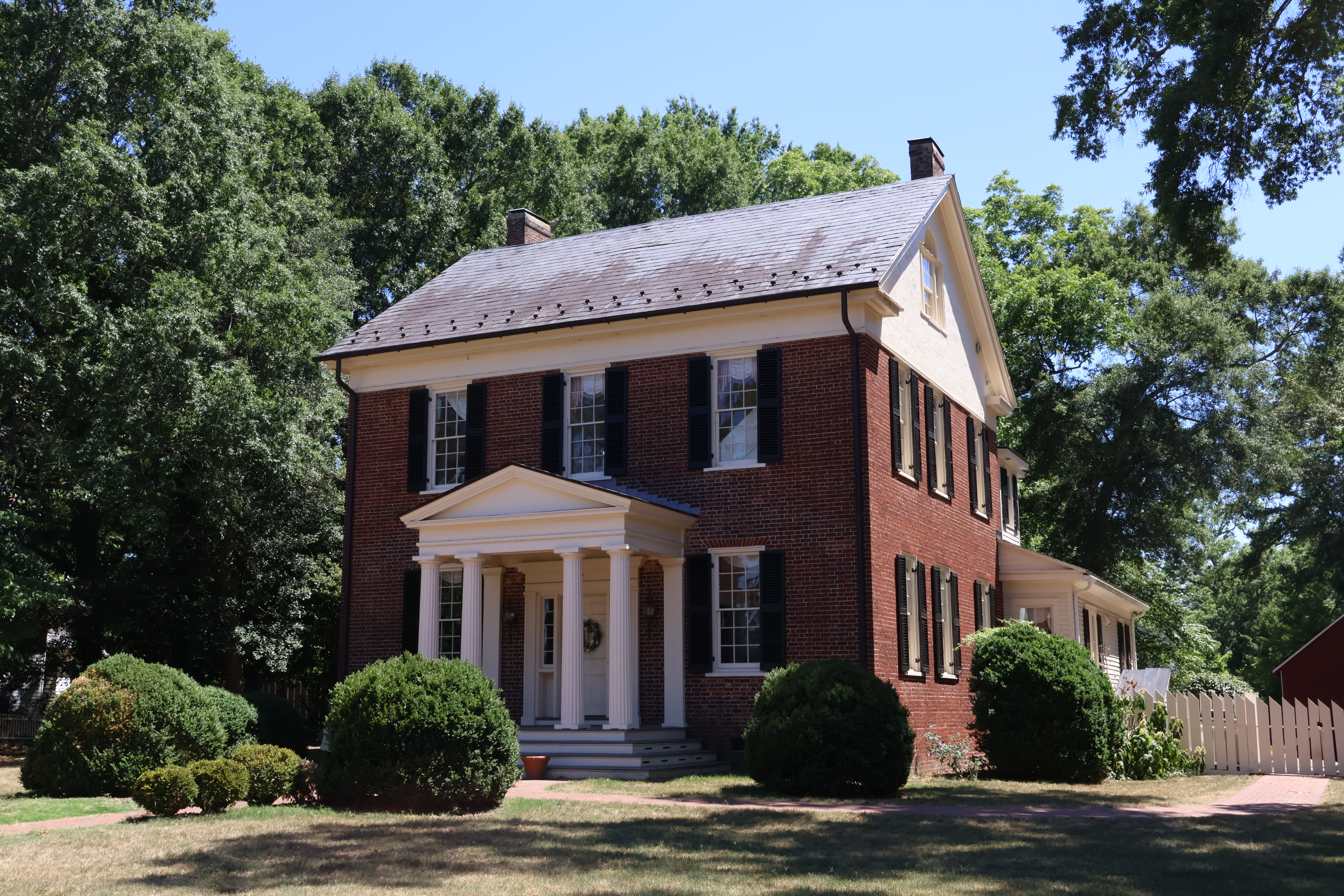
- Pictured in 2026

- Location within North Carolina Location within the United States
- Location: 112 E. South Ave., Wake Forest, North Carolina
- Coordinates: 35°58′42″N 78°30′44″W
- Area: 1.2 acres (0.49 ha)
- Built: 1838, 1855
- Architect: John Berry
- Architectural style: Greek Revival
- MPS: Historic and Architectural Resources of Wake County, North Carolina
- NRHP reference No.: 14000265
- Added to NRHP: May 27, 2014

South Brick House is a historic home located at Wake Forest, Wake County, North Carolina. The house was built in 1838, and is a 2 1/2-story, double-pile, Greek Revival-style brick dwelling with a side gable roof. A number of small, frame additions were made to the rear of the house, beginning in the late-19th century. It features a replacement pedimented portico supported by four Doric order columns. The house retains finely preserved interior decoration from Asher Benjamin’s 1830 pattern book, Practical House Carpenter. Also on the property are the contributing kitchen (1855), smokehouse (1855), and a single-story, side-gabled, weatherboarded, frame house (c. 1838, c. 1960). The house was originally built as faculty accommodation for Wake Forest Institute.

It was listed on the National Register of Historic Places in 2014. It is located in the Wake Forest Historic District.
