= John Appleton Wilson =

American architect (1851-1927)

- Born: October 7, 1851; Baltimore, Maryland
- Died: April 17, 1927 (aged 75); Baltimore, Maryland
- Occupation: Architect
- Practice: J.A. & W.T. Wilson
- Buildings: Eastside of Belvidere Terrace, McKim House
- Projects: Maryland State House Senate Chamber restoration, Ft. McHenry restoration
- Design: 2nd Maryland Infantry C.S.A.(1st Maryland Battalion C.S.A.) Monument at Culp's Hill, Gettysburg, Pennsylvania

John Appleton Wilson (October 7, 1851, in Baltimore, Maryland – April 17, 1927, in Baltimore) was an American architect.

== Personal life ==
Wilson was born in Baltimore, Maryland, the oldest son of Rev. Franklin Wilson, a well-known Baptist minister, and Virginia Appleton Wilson. He attended private schools and Columbian College (now the George Washington University) in Washington, D.C., and later studied architecture at the Massachusetts Institute of Technology (M.I.T.). After leaving M.I.T., he continued his education in the office of Baldwin & Price in Baltimore. On October 16, 1877, he married Mary Wade of Virginia. The couple resided at 1013 St. Paul Street, Baltimore, and had a summer home at Monterey in Franklin County, Pennsylvania. They had one daughter, Virginia Appleton Wilson.

Wilson was an active member of historical and professional societies. He was a member and secretary of the Maryland Historical Society, vice-president of the Sons of the Revolution, and historian for the Society of the War of 1812. He held many offices of the Maryland Society of Colonial Wars including treasurer, member of the council, chair of the membership committee and deputy governor general from Maryland for the national society. Wilson also served on the Baltimore Municipal Art Commission and was an early member of the Baltimore chapter of the American Institute of Architects, joining in 1879. He was a member of the University Club and a director of the Colonial Trust Company. The Wilsons were also involved in philanthropic work, with John serving on the board of governors of the Maryland School for Boys and as a trustee of the Baltimore Orphan Asylum, and Mary as the president of the asylum from 1896 to 1918.

Wilson died at his home in Baltimore on April 17, 1927, following a brief illness. His estate was valued at $110,715 and was divided between his wife and daughter, who were given joint ownership of the Wilson homes in Baltimore and Pennsylvania.

== Professional life ==
Wilson and his cousin, William Thomas Wilson, formed a partnership and named their new firm J.A. & W.T. Wilson, Architects. This architectural firm designed Baltimore homes from the end of the nineteenth century until William's death in 1907. Some of the more notable estates were built for Catherine L. McKim. He designed McKim's home first and then 14 more upon her property at Belvidere Terrace, all in the Queen Anne style. Wilson worked on the restoration of Fort McHenry, restoration of the Mount Clare estate and park, and the marking of the grave of Sir Robert Eden, Maryland's last colonial governor. Additionally, he designed the monument to the 2nd Maryland Battalion of the Confederate States Army (1st Maryland C.S.A. originally), on Culp's Hill in Gettysburg, Pennsylvania, as well as churches and community and industrial buildings in Maryland, North Carolina and Virginia.

On February 2, 1894, the Maryland State Senate requested that Wilson team up with the well known Annapolis artist Frank Blackwell Mayer to conduct a study of the feasibility of restoring the Maryland State House old Senate Chamber. The state wanted to restore it to the condition it had been in when George Washington resigned his commission as commander-in-chief of the Continental Army in 1783. After six weeks of working without pay, Mayer and Wilson issued their report on March 19, 1894, that listed items to be repaired, replaced or reproduced and estimated the total cost to be $6,150. They concluded their report with a recommendation that the work be started immediately. However, much to their dismay, the work was not begun until Governor Edwin Warfield acted on the issue in 1904 and 1905. Wilson, commenting on his act of charity, said, "It was a labor of love unto the end."

== Notable buildings ==
- Lea Laboratory (1887-1888), original campus of Wake Forest University, now Southeastern Baptist Theological Seminary, listed on the National Register of Historic Places in 1975.
