= Royall Cotton Mill Commissary =

Historic building in North Carolina, US

- U.S. National Register of Historic Places
- U.S. Historic district – Contributing property
- Location within North Carolina Location within the United States
- Location: Jct. of Brick and Brewer Sts., Wake Forest, North Carolina
- Coordinates: 35°59′21″N 78°30′5″W
- Area: less than one acre
- Built: 1900
- Built by: Royall Cotton Mill
- Architectural style: Vernacular industrial
- NRHP reference No.: 91001504
- Added to NRHP: October 16, 1991

Royall Cotton Mill Commissary is a historic commercial building associated with the Royall Mill and located at Wake Forest, Wake County, North Carolina. It built in 1900, and is a two-story, rectangular brick building with a low gabled metal roof and stepped parapet. It measures 32 feet by 100 feet and has segmental arched windows. The Royall Cotton Mill Commissary closed in 1934. The building has been rehabilitate into apartments.

It was listed on the National Register of Historic Places in 1991. It is located in the Glen Royall Mill Village Historic District.
