= Walnut Hill Historic District (Knightdale, North Carolina) =

Historic district in North Carolina, United States

- U.S. National Register of Historic Places
- U.S. Historic district
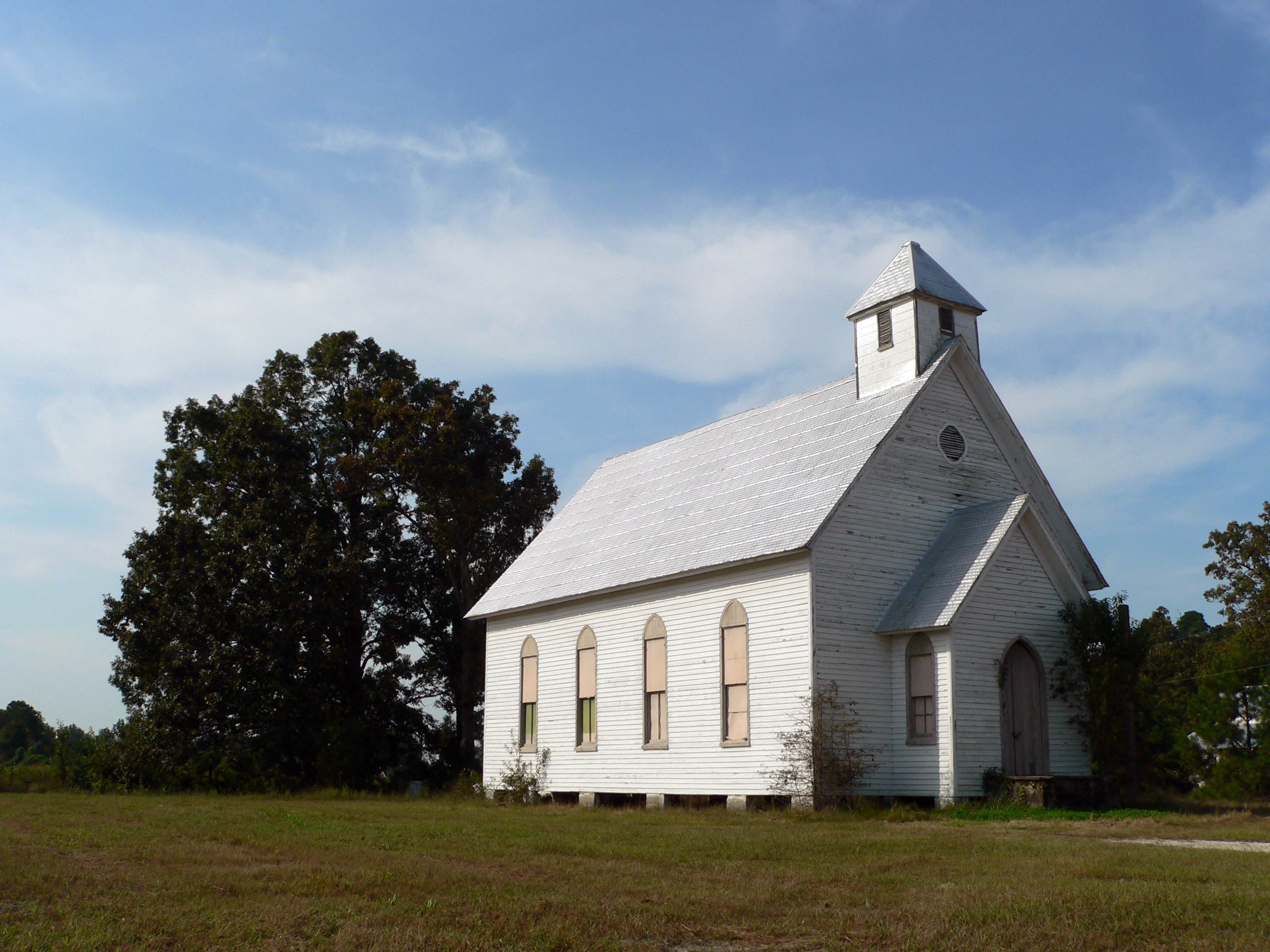
- Oaky Grove Methodist Church

- Location within North Carolina Location within the United States
- Nearest city: Shotwell, North Carolina
- Coordinates: 35°44′2.00″N 78°26′44.00″W
- Area: 157 acres (64 ha)
- Architectural style: Gothic Revival, Victorian
- MPS: Wake County MPS
- NRHP reference No.: 00001183
- Added to NRHP: October 6, 2000

The Walnut Hill Historic District is a collection of 40 family dwellings, agricultural outbuildings, and other structures and sites associated with the Walnut Hill Plantation and the Mial-Williamson and Joseph Blake farms near Shotwell, North Carolina. The historic district represents the post-Civil War growth of one of the largest agricultural centers in Wake County. It is situated primarily along the northeast end of Mial Plantation Road (State Road 2509) between its intersections with Major Slade and Smithfield Roads.

The Walnut Hill Historic District was listed on the National Register of Historic Places in October 2000. The nearby Walnut Hill Cotton Gin and Oaky Grove Plantation have been listed in the National Register separately, in 1986 and 1993, respectively.

== Oaky Grove Methodist Church ==
Oaky Grove Methodist Church was founded in the 1830s and was originally located on land belonging to the Oaky Grove Plantation about a mile to the north of the present structure. The church building that survives today was constructed in 1876 by contractor W. S. Walden using materials from Thomas A. Briggs's store in Raleigh. The pointed-arch frames of the windows and front door make it one of the earliest gothic revival churches in the county. The church has been largely vacant since its congregation merged with the Methodist church in Knightdale in 1949.

The small cemetery situated directly behind the church was not the official burial ground for church members. Instead, it hold the remains of several people who relocated to the area from Wilkes County, North Carolina in the late 19th and early 20th centuries.

== Frog Pond Academy ==
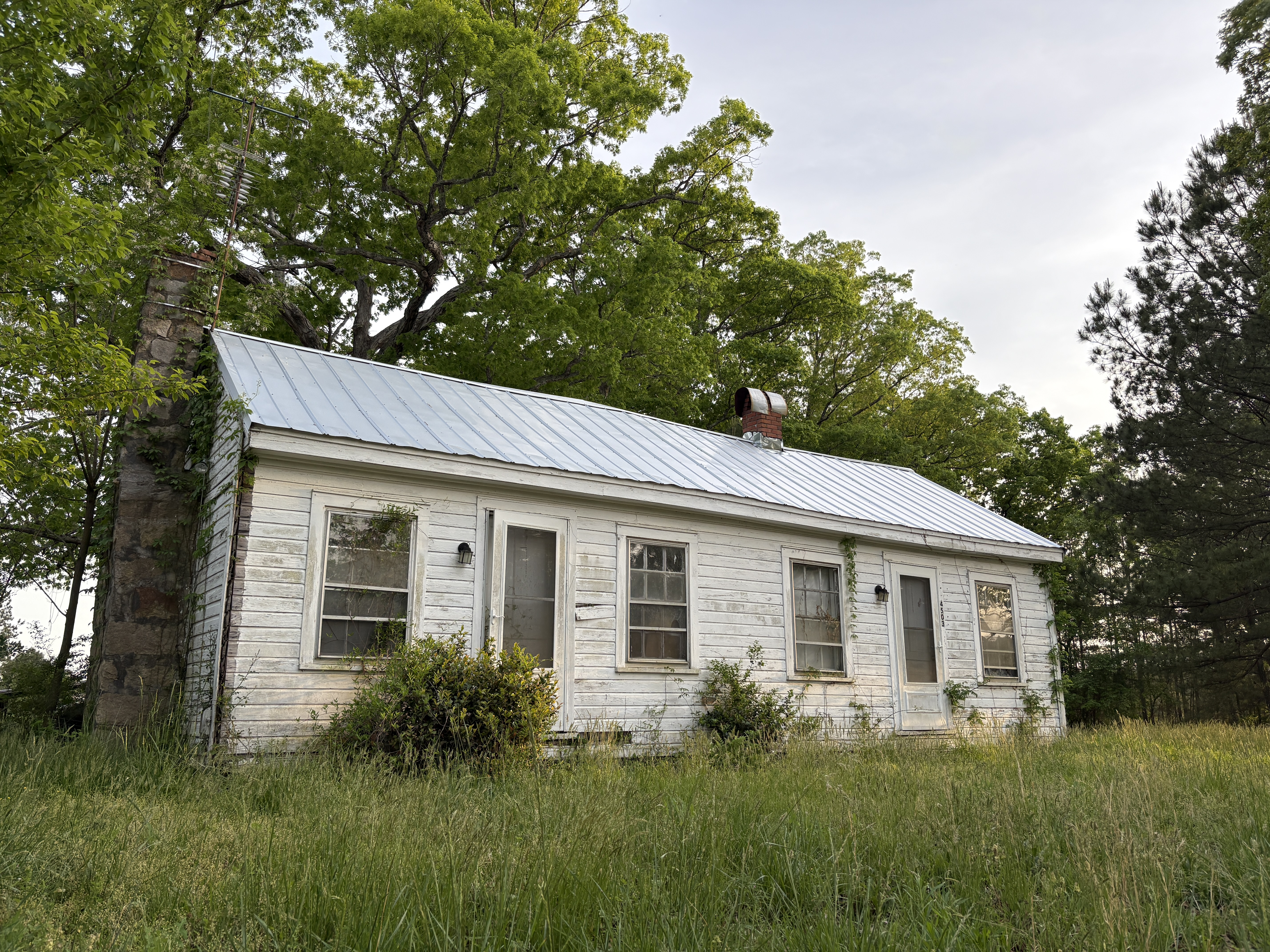
The historic Frog Pond Academy building

Frog Pond Academy was the name given to the small plantation school by the children who studied there, in honor of the multitude of frogs that are said to have inhabited the puddles around the school after a heavy rain. Located a few hundred yards west of Oaky Grove Methodist Church and immediately south of the Mial-Williamson Farm house, the school consists of two rooms, each with its own front door, with a large granite chimney anchoring the east end of the structure. Alonzo T. Mial built the school in the 1860s for his own children, as well as others in the surrounding community, but it is unknown for how long the school was actually in use. With the exception of a twelve-year period during which it served as an office for the North Carolina Agricultural Experiment Station, the schoolhouse has been used as a tenant dwelling for most of the past century.

== Joseph Blake House ==
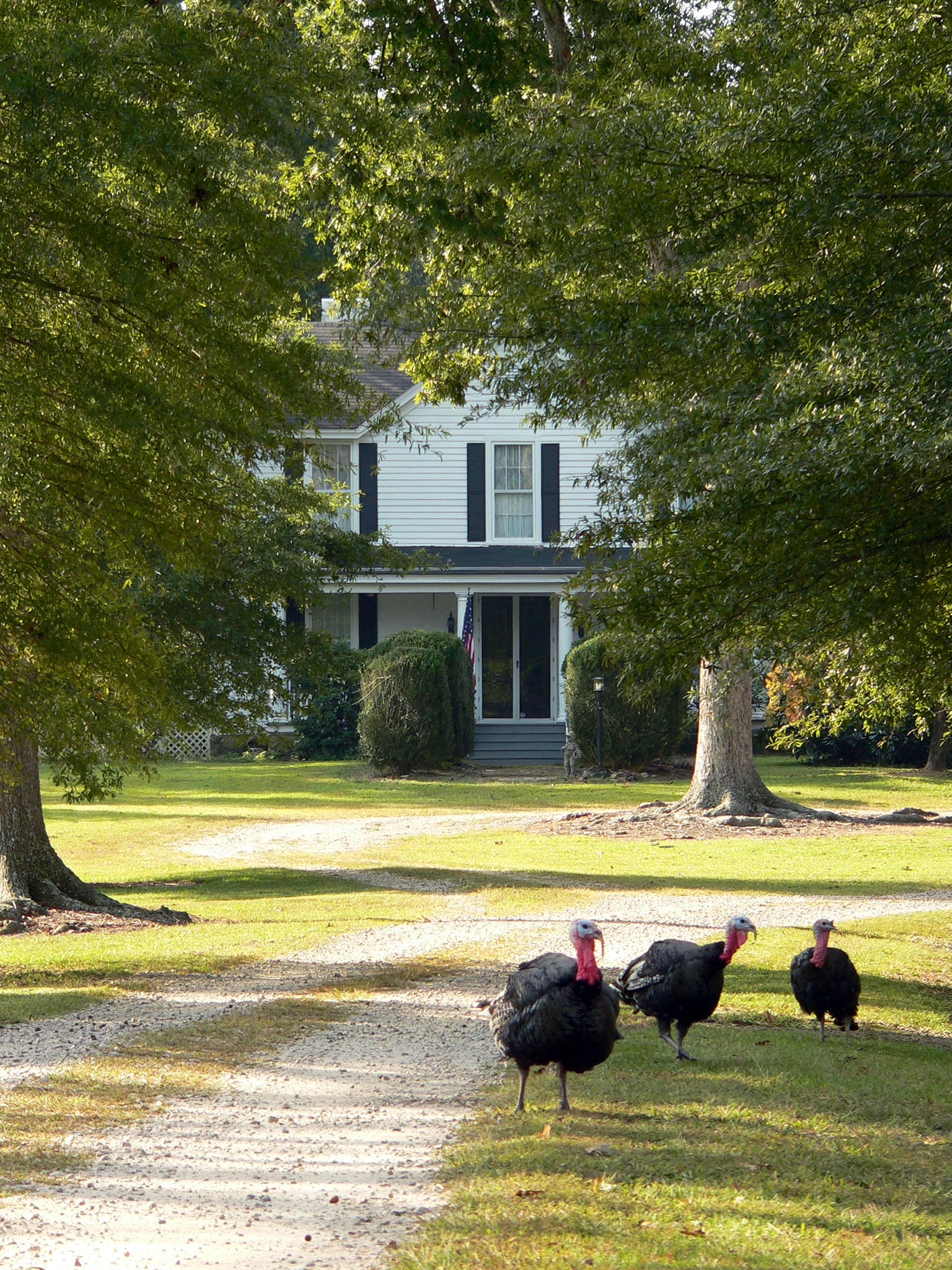
A flock of wild turkeys forages along the driveway leading to the Joseph Blake House

The Joseph Blake House is situated in an open grove of large hardwood trees on the southwest corner of the intersection of Mial Plantation and Smithfield Roads. It was originally built in the 1860s by Joseph Blake, son of the founding pastor of Oaky Grove Methodist Church and half-brother of Alonzo T. Mial. All but one room of the original house burned in the late 1800s; the house seen today was constructed soon thereafter on the same foundation. The Doric columns on the front porch and the ornate front door are said to have been salvaged from older homes in Raleigh that were being demolished.

In addition to farming, Joseph Blake also served several terms as county surveyor starting in 1884. His office, a one-room wood frame building, sits to the northwest of the main house. It was constructed around 1870 and features a hip roof, brick chimney, and a single door and window.

== Conservation ==
In 2013, the Triangle Land Conservancy purchased 405 acres (164 ha) surrounding the historic district to form the Bailey and Sarah Williamson Preserve. An additional 42 acres (17 ha) encompassing the Oaky Grove Church, Frog Pond Academy, and other historic structures were donated to the conservancy in 2022. The conservancy plans to restore the buildings and maintain a portion of the land in agricultural production.

== See also ==
- List of Registered Historic Places in North Carolina
- National Register of Historic Places listings in Wake County, North Carolina
- Walnut Hill Cotton Gin
- Oaky Grove
