= Vernon Place =

Historic house in North Carolina, United States

- U.S. National Register of Historic Places
- Location within North Carolina Location within the United States
- Location: North of Como off US 258, near Como, North Carolina
- Coordinates: 36°30′15″N 76°59′59″W
- Area: 100 acres (40 ha)
- Architectural style: Greek Revival, Federal, Colonial Revival
- NRHP reference No.: 82003469
- Added to NRHP: April 29, 1982

Vernon Place, also known as the Cowper-Taylor House, is a historic plantation house located near Como, Hertford County, North Carolina. It is dated to the late-1820s, and is a two-story, five-bay, T-plan, transitional Federal / Greek Revival frame dwelling. It has a low-pitched, gable roof and Colonial Revival style one-story hip-roof wraparound porch added about 1900. Also on the property are the contributing one-room, 1 1/2-story frame Federal style house, wellhouse, and a Delco plant.

It was listed on the National Register of Historic Places in 1982.
