= Glen Royall Mill Village Historic District =

Historic district in North Carolina, United States

- U.S. National Register of Historic Places
- U.S. Historic district
- Location within North Carolina Location within the United States
- Location: Roughly bounded by N. Main St., E. Cedar Ave., CSX RR, and Royall Cotton Mill, Wake Forest, North Carolina
- Coordinates: 35°59′20″N 78°30′10″W
- Area: 45 acres (18 ha)
- Built: c. 1900
- Built by: Hicks, Benjamin T.
- Architect: Briggs, John D.
- Architectural style: Bungalow/craftsman
- MPS: Wake County MPS
- NRHP reference No.: 99001046
- Added to NRHP: August 27, 1999

Glen Royall Mill Village Historic District is a historic mill town and national historic district located at Wake Forest, Wake County, North Carolina. The district encompasses 82 contributing buildings and 1 contributing site built between about 1900 and 1949. It is located in a residential section of the town of Wake Forest. There are notable examples of Bungalow / American Craftsman style architecture. Located in the district is the separately listed Royall Cotton Mill Commissary. Other notable buildings include the Royall Cotton Mill (1899-1900), the Powell-White House (1909-1910), and pyramidal cottages, triple-A cottages, and shotgun houses.

The district was listed on the National Register of Historic Places in 1999.
