= Leigh Farm =

Historic house in North Carolina, United States

- U.S. National Register of Historic Places
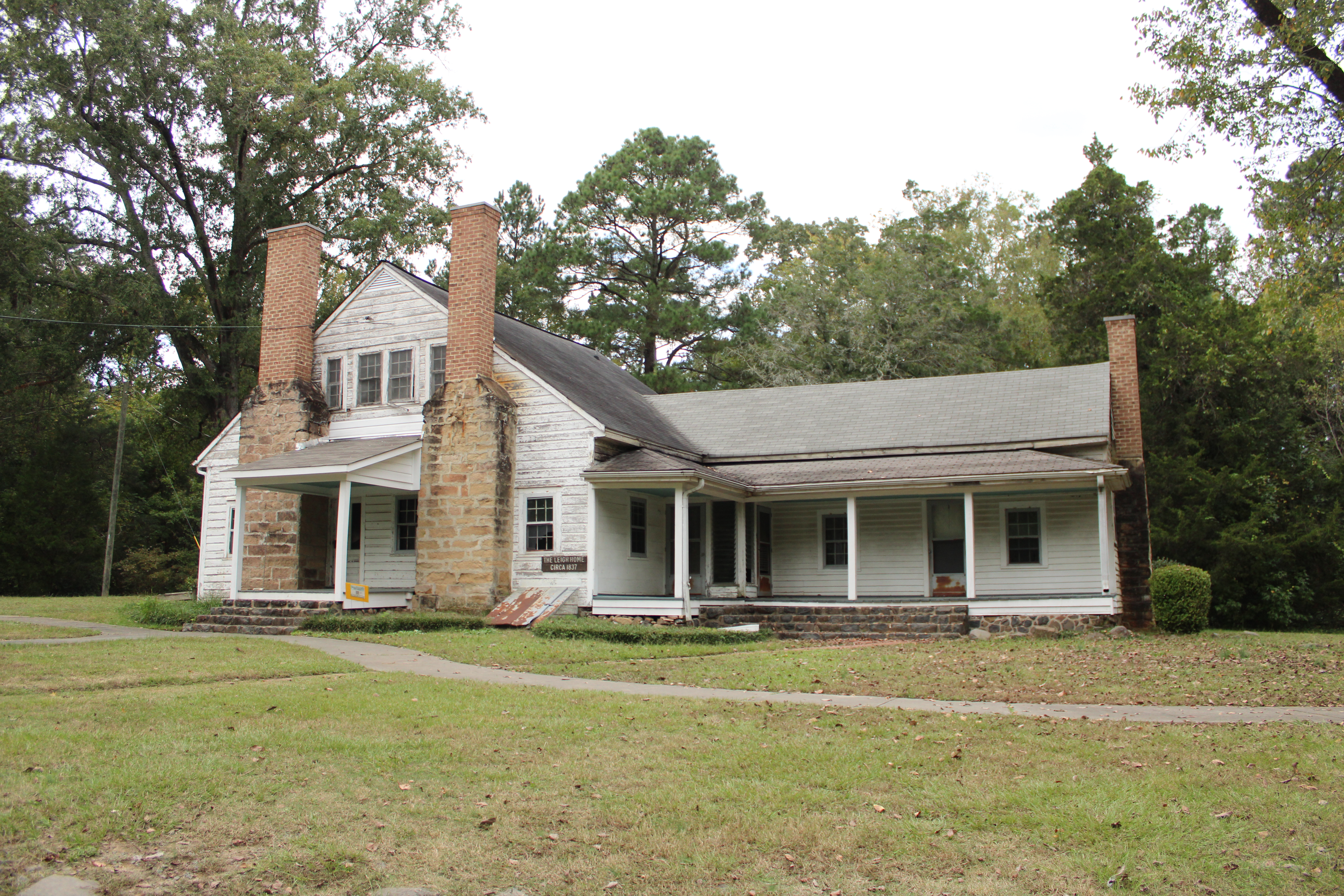
- The Leigh Home as it appeared c. 1837.

- Location within North Carolina Location within the United States
- Location: East of Chapel Hill off NC 54, near Chapel Hill, North Carolina
- Coordinates: 35°55′19″N 78°58′58″W
- Area: 20 acres (8.1 ha)
- Built: 1834
- NRHP reference No.: 75001257
- Added to NRHP: September 5, 1975

The Leigh Farm is a historic home and plantation complex located near Chapel Hill, Durham County, North Carolina. The house was built about 1834, and is a one-story, three-bay, frame dwelling with a broad gable roof. Also on the property are the contributing frame gable-roof well, dairy, smokehouse, log slave quarters, a log dwelling, corn crib, frame carriage house, and log tobacco barn.

It was listed on the National Register of Historic Places in 1975.
