= Fairntosh Plantation =

Historic house in North Carolina, United States

- Fairntosh
- U.S. National Register of Historic Places
- Location within North Carolina Location within the United States
- Location: Near junction of SR 1004 and 1632, near Durham, North Carolina
- Coordinates: 36°5′56″N 78°49′42″W
- Area: 100 acres (40 ha)
- Built: c. 1800
- Architectural style: Georgian, Federal
- NRHP reference No.: 73001337
- Added to NRHP: April 3, 1973

Fairntosh Plantation is a historic plantation house and complex located near Durham, Durham County, North Carolina. It consists of two separate Georgian / Federal style houses joined in a "T"-shape. The rear section is older, and is a two-story, side hall plan structure with a center-hall plan. The larger section is a two-story, five bay by three bay structure. Also on the property are the contributing outbuildings including a two-story kitchen, slave quarters, smokehouse, dairy, office schoolhouse and other dependencies.

It was listed on the National Register of Historic Places in 1973.
