= Beaver Dam Plantation House =

Historic house in North Carolina, United States

- U.S. National Register of Historic Places
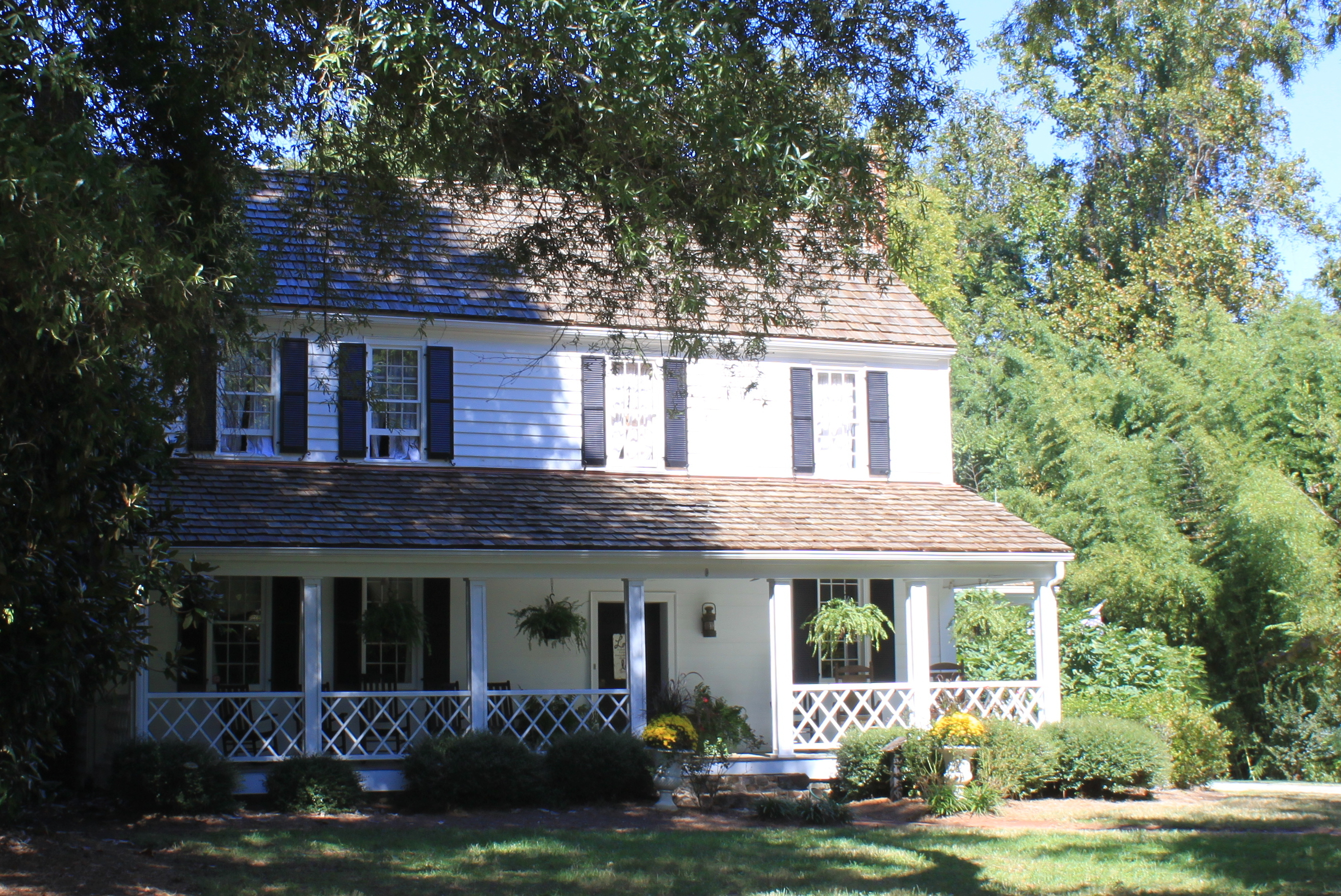

- Location within North Carolina Location within the United States
- Location: SE of Davidson on NC 73, near Davidson, North Carolina
- Coordinates: 35°28′32″N 80°49′4″W
- Area: 8.7 acres (3.5 ha)
- Built: 1829
- Architectural style: Federal, Federal Plantation House
- NRHP reference No.: 79001735
- Added to NRHP: March 19, 1979

Beaver Dam Plantation House is a historic plantation house located near Davidson, Mecklenburg County, North Carolina. It was built in 1829, and is a two-story, four-bay, single pile Federal style dwelling. It has gable roof, brick exterior end chimneys, and a one-story, full-width, shed roof porch. It was the home of William Lee Davidson, Jr., son of William Lee Davidson and the people he enslaved to work the plantation. It was also the site of the committee meeting of the Concord Presbytery in April 1835, during which the location of Davidson College was determined.

It was listed on the National Register of Historic Places in 1979.
