= Sloop Point, North Carolina =

Unincorporated community in North Carolina, US

Coordinates: 34°24′31″N 77°35′59″W

Sloop Point is an unincorporated community and village in Pender County, North Carolina, United States. It was incorporated as a village on July 1, 1996, and subsequently disincorporated on July 22, 1998, making it one of the shortest-lived municipalities in the state's history, lasting just over two years.

The community is part of the Wilmington metropolitan statistical area.

== See also ==
- Sloop Point (1729); historic house is one of the oldest in North Carolina
