= Wakefields =

Historic house in North Carolina, United States

- U.S. National Register of Historic Places
- Location within North Carolina Location within the United States
- Location: Southeast of Creedmoor off U.S. 15A, near Wake Forest, North Carolina
- Coordinates: 36°0′8″N 78°31′23″W
- Area: 9 acres (3.6 ha)
- Built: c. 1831
- Architectural style: Greek Revival, Federal
- NRHP reference No.: 74001378
- Added to NRHP: October 16, 1974

Wakefields, also known as Home Acres, is a historic plantation house located near Wake Forest, Wake County, North Carolina. It was built about 1831, and is a two-story, five bay by two bay, transitional Federal / Greek Revival-style frame dwelling. Two earlier sections are attached to the rear of the main block. The front facade features a central two-tier portico supported by Doric order columns. Also on the property is a dwelling dating to the 18th century and a slave house / chicken coop.

It was listed on the National Register of Historic Places in 1974.
