= Shotwell, North Carolina =

- Unincorporated community
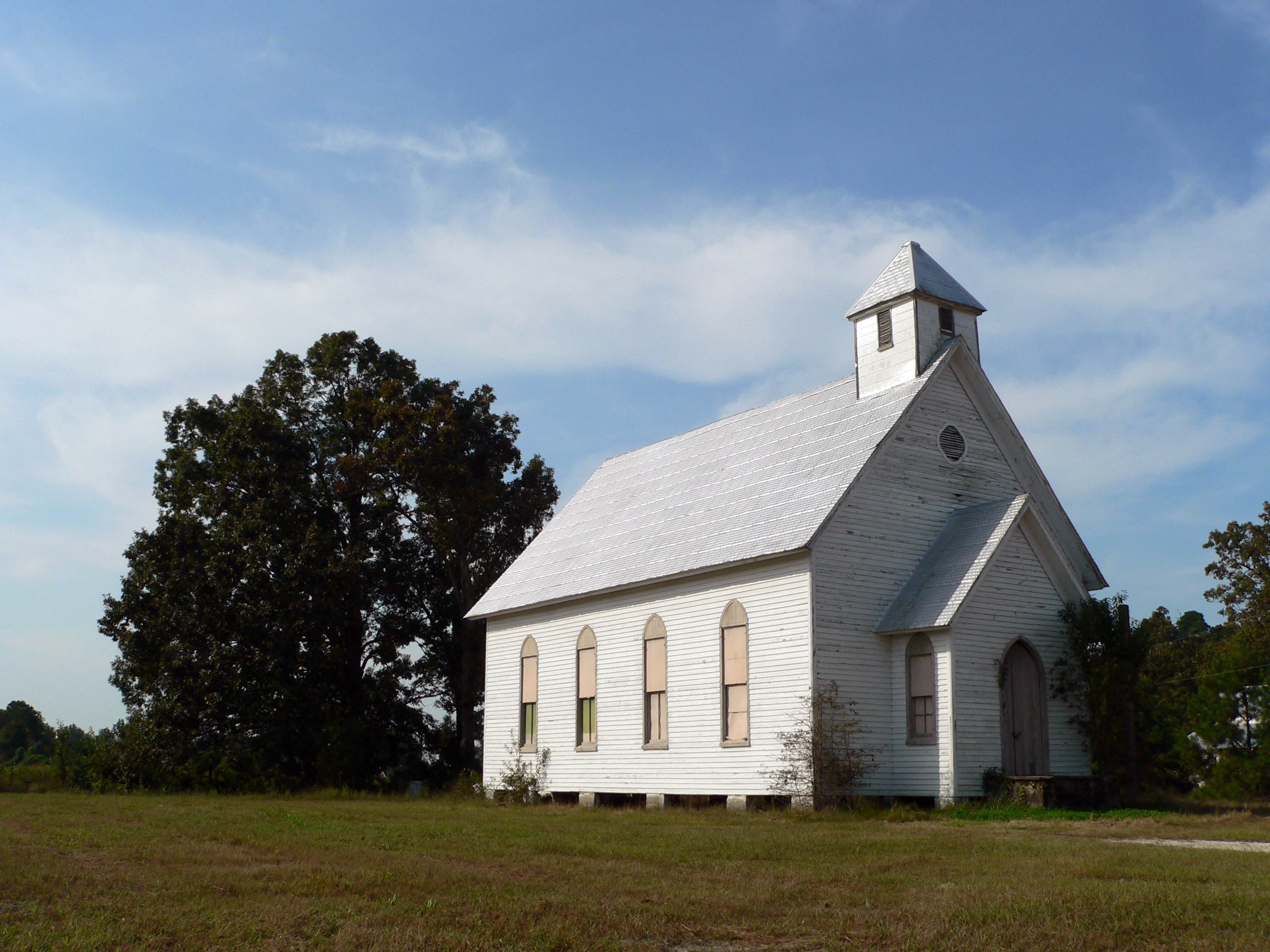
- Historic Oaky Grove Methodist Church in Shotwell, North Carolina

- Location of Shotwell in North Carolina Shotwell, North Carolina (the United States)
- Coordinates: 35°44′14″N 78°26′41″W
- Country: United States
- State: North Carolina
- County: Wake
- Elevation: 289 ft (88 m)
- Time zone: UTC-5 (Eastern (EST))
  - Summer (DST): UTC-4 (EDT)
- Area code: 919
- FIPS code: 61740
- GNIS feature ID: 1006371

Shotwell is an unincorporated community in rural eastern Wake County, North Carolina, United States, located about 4 miles (6.4 km) south of Knightdale and 11 miles (18 km) east of Raleigh at the confluence of Smithfield, Mial Plantation, Major Slade, Grasshopper, and Turnipseed Roads. Shotwell has been inhabited since the early 19th century and is home to a number of historic structures. A post office was established in 1883 but closed less than two decades later.

Oaky Grove was listed on the National Register of Historic Places in 1993.

== See also ==
- Walnut Hill Cotton Gin
- Walnut Hill Historic District (Knightdale, North Carolina)
