= White Oak Plantation =

Historic house in North Carolina, United States

- U.S. National Register of Historic Places
- Location within North Carolina Location within the United States
- Location: E of Charlotte on SR 2826, near Charlotte, North Carolina
- Coordinates: 35°14′54″N 80°41′26″W
- Area: 14.1 acres (5.7 ha)
- Built: 1792
- Architectural style: Catawba River Valley School
- NRHP reference No.: 78001966
- Added to NRHP: February 7, 1978

White Oak Plantation, also known as the William Johnston House, is a historic plantation house located near Charlotte, Mecklenburg County, North Carolina. It was built about 1792, and is a two-story, Catawba River Valley School style brick dwelling. The original Quaker plan interior has been converted to a center hall plan. It has a gable roof overhang and a full-width, two-story gabled porch. It was built by William Johnston, a captain in the North Carolina militia at the Battle of King's Mountain in 1780.

The plantation was listed on the National Register of Historic Places in 1978.
