= Wake Forest, North Carolina =

- Town
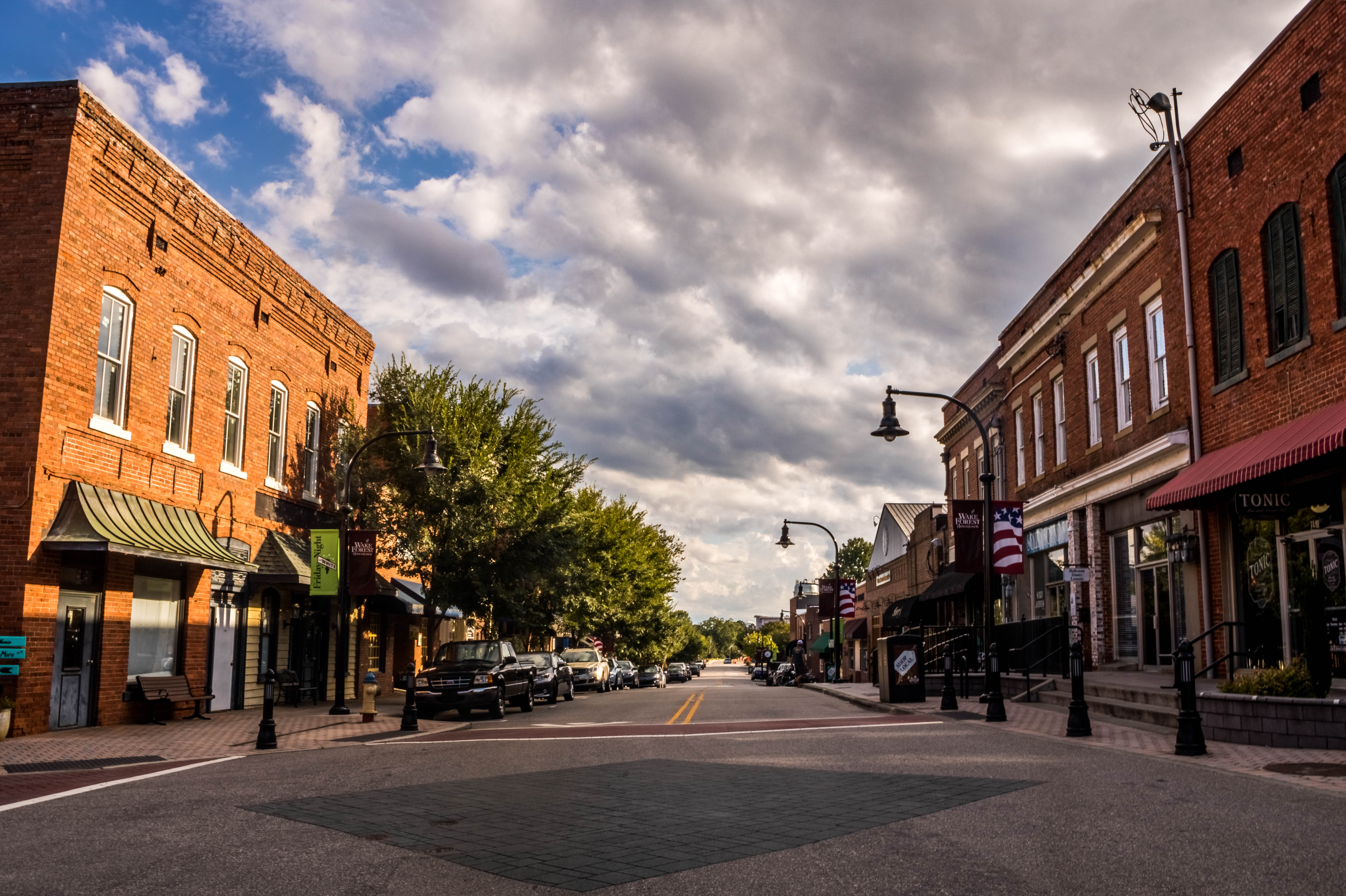
- White Street

- Seal

- Location in Wake County and the state of North Carolina.
- Coordinates: 35°57′24″N 78°31′29″W
- Country: United States
- State: North Carolina
- Counties: Wake, Franklin
- Incorporated: 1880
- Named for: The large wooded areas of northern Wake County

Government
  - Mayor: Ben Clapsaddle (D)

Area
  - Total: 19.67 sq mi (50.95 km^{2})
  - Land: 19.52 sq mi (50.55 km^{2})
  - Water: 0.15 sq mi (0.40 km^{2}) 0.76%
- Elevation: 295 ft (90 m)

Population (2020)
  - Total: 47,601
  - Estimate (2023): 54,337
  - Density: 2,438.8/sq mi (941.62/km^{2})
- Time zone: UTC−5 (Eastern (EST))
  - Summer (DST): UTC−4 (EDT)
- ZIP Codes: 27587–27588
- Area codes: 919, 984
- FIPS code: 37-70540
- GNIS feature ID: 2406816
- Website: www.wakeforestnc.gov

Wake Forest is a town in Wake and Franklin counties in the U.S. state of North Carolina. Located almost entirely in Wake County, it lies just north of the state capital, Raleigh. At the 2020 census, the population was 47,601, up from 30,117 in 2010. It is part of the Raleigh metropolitan area. Wake Forest was the original home of Wake Forest University for 122 years before it moved to Winston-Salem in 1956.

== History ==
In 1832, Dr. Calvin Jones, originally from Massachusetts, bought 615 acres (2.49 km^{2}) of forested land in Wake County, North Carolina. He built his plantation here. The sparsely populated area became known as the Forest of Wake, or Wake Forest. Jones sold his farm to the North Carolina Baptist Convention for $2,000, who opened the Wake Forest Manual Labor Institute, later Wake Forest College, on the site. The Raleigh & Gaston Railroad, completed in 1840, established a depot in nearby Forestville that stimulated the school and surrounding village. College leaders convinced the railroad to move the depot even closer to the college in 1874, leading to more economic development. This community was incorporated as the "Town of Wake Forest College" in 1880. In 1909, the word "College" was removed from the name of the town. The college moved to the much larger city of Winston-Salem in 1956. Southeastern Baptist Theological Seminary began offering classes on the original campus of Wake Forest University in 1950, and occupied the entire campus when the university completed its move.

In 2007, the town was listed by Forbes magazine as the 20th fastest growing suburb in America, with a 73.2 percent increase in population between 2000 and 2006.

== Geography ==
Interactive map of Wake Forest

According to the United States Census Bureau, the town has a total area of 19.67 square miles (50.9 km^{2}), of which 19.52 square miles (50.6 km^{2}) is land and 0.15 square miles (0.39 km^{2}) (0.76%) is water.

Wake Forest is located in the northeast-central region of North Carolina, where the North American Piedmont and Atlantic Coastal Plain regions meet. This area is known as the "Fall Line" because it marks the elevation inland at which waterfalls begin to appear in creeks and rivers. Its central Piedmont location situates Wake Forest approximately three hours by car west of Atlantic Beach, and four hours east of the Great Smoky Mountains.

=== Climate ===
Wake Forest enjoys a moderate subtropical climate, with moderate temperatures in the spring, fall, and winter. Summers are typically hot with high humidity. Winter highs generally range in the low 50s °F (10 to 13 °C) with lows in the low-to-mid 30s °F (−2 to 2 °C), although an occasional 60 °F (15 °C) or warmer winter day is not uncommon. Spring and fall days usually reach the low-to-mid 70s °F (low 20s °C), with lows at night in the lower 50s °F (10 to 14 °C). Summer daytime highs often reach the upper 80s to low 90s °F (29 to 35 °C). The rainiest months are July and August.

== Demographics ==
Historical population
| Census | Pop. | Note | %± |
|---|---|---|---|
| 1880 | 456 | | — |
| 1890 | 858 | | 88.2% |
| 1900 | 823 | | −4.1% |
| 1910 | 1,443 | | 75.3% |
| 1920 | 1,425 | | −1.2% |
| 1930 | 1,536 | | 7.8% |
| 1940 | 1,562 | | 1.7% |
| 1950 | 3,704 | | 137.1% |
| 1960 | 2,664 | | −28.1% |
| 1970 | 3,148 | | 18.2% |
| 1980 | 3,780 | | 20.1% |
| 1990 | 5,769 | | 52.6% |
| 2000 | 12,588 | | 118.2% |
| 2010 | 30,117 | | 139.3% |
| 2020 | 47,601 | | 58.1% |
| 2025 (est.) | 58,147 | ▲ | 22.2% |
U.S. Decennial Census

=== 2020 census ===
As of the 2020 census, Wake Forest had a population of 47,601, with 16,869 households and 11,104 families. The median age was 37.7 years. About 28.4% of residents were under the age of 18, and 13.2% were age 65 or older. For every 100 females, there were 90.7 males, and for every 100 females age 18 and over, there were 86.8 males.

In total, 100.0% of residents lived in urban areas, while 0.0% lived in rural areas.

Of all households, 43.6% had children under the age of 18 living in them. Married-couple households accounted for 60.2% of households, while 11.1% had a male householder with no spouse or partner present, and 24.5% had a female householder with no spouse or partner present. About 19.8% of households were made up of individuals, and 8.5% had someone living alone who was age 65 or older.

There were 17,828 housing units, of which 5.4% were vacant. The homeowner vacancy rate was 2.0%, and the rental vacancy rate was 7.9%.

Wake Forest racial composition
| Race | Number | Percentage |
|---|---|---|
| White (non-Hispanic) | 32,087 | 67.41% |
| Black or African American (non-Hispanic) | 7,480 | 15.71% |
| Native American | 88 | 0.18% |
| Asian | 1,751 | 3.68% |
| Pacific Islander | 24 | 0.05% |
| Other/Mixed | 2,402 | 5.05% |
| Hispanic or Latino | 3,769 | 7.92% |

== Arts and culture ==
=== Performing arts ===
Wake Forest hosts a variety of performing arts venues and events. The Wake Forest Dance Festival held every fall at E. Carroll Joyner Park features a variety of local, national, and international dancers. Notable participants include the UNCG School of Dance and the Carolina Ballet. The Wake Forest Renaissance Center hosts theatrical and musical performances, as well as arts workshops and classes.

=== Historical locations ===
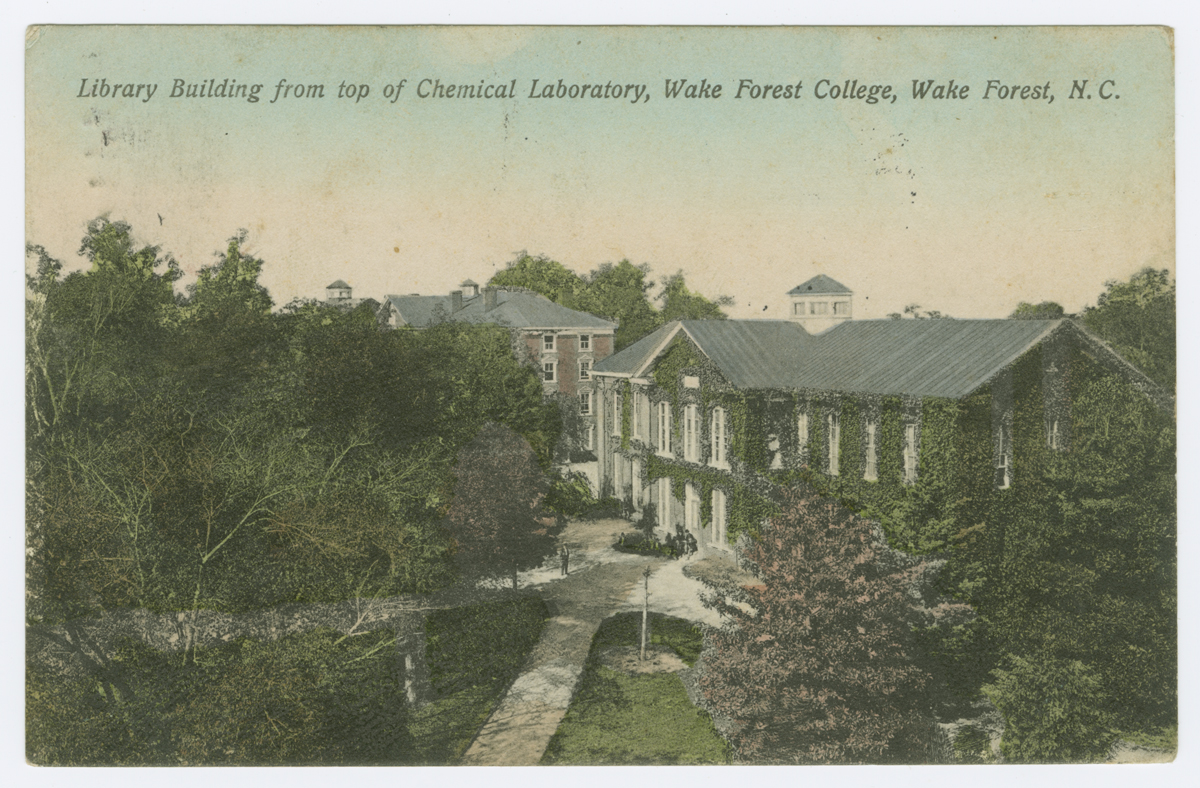
Library Building from top of Chemical Laboratory, Wake Forest College, ca. 1915

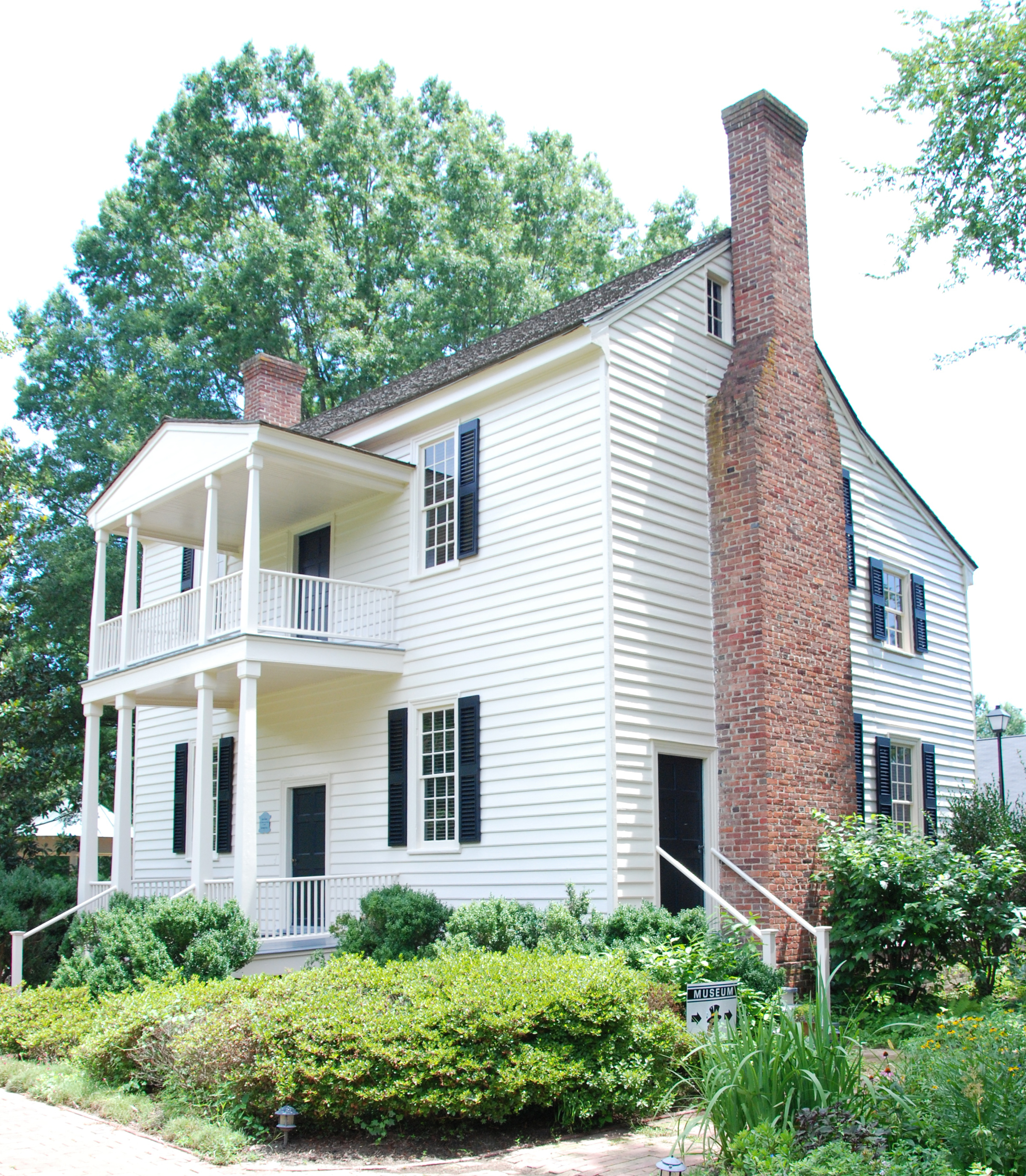
The Calvin Jones House in 2013

The DuBois Center is listed on the National Register of Historic Places. The W. E. B. DuBois School opened in 1926 for the African-American community in Wake Forest before racial segregation ceased in 1971. After the school outgrew the facility and moved to a new location, the building was vacant for a decade until the DuBois Alumni Association purchased the building and made it into a community center.

Other listings in or near Wake Forest on the National Register of Historic Places are the Bailey-Estes House, Downtown Wake Forest Historic District, Glen Royall Mill Village Historic District, Lea Laboratory, Oakforest, Powell House, Purefoy-Chappell House and Outbuildings, Purefoy-Dunn Plantation, Rock Cliff Farm, Royall Cotton Mill Commissary, South Brick House, Thompson House, Wake Forest Historic District, Wakefield Dairy Complex, and Wakefields.

Wake Forest Historical Museum, also known as the Dr. Calvin Jones House, was built in 1820 and was the residence of the first president of Wake Forest College and the center of activities that took place at the school. The museum displays the history of the town of Wake Forest as well as Wake Forest University. The house contains collections of photos, books, college publications, furniture, documents, professors' writings, and medical, law and sports memorabilia.

=== Library ===
Wake County Public Libraries operates a branch in Wake Forest.

== Parks and recreation ==
Wake Forest is home to the Falls Lake State Recreation Area. Falls Lake Park contains the 12,000-acre (49 km^{2}) Falls Lake and 26,000 acres (110 km^{2}) of woodlands.

Wake Forest is served by ten parks and community centers. They include the following:

- Ailey Young Park
- H.L. Miller Park
- Holding Park and Wake Forest Community House
- J.B. Flaherty Park
- Joyner Park
- Kiwanis Park
- Plummer Park
- Smith Creek Soccer Center
- Taylor Street Park and Alston Massenburg Center
- Tyler Run Park

== Government ==
Wake Forest operates under the council–manager form of government. The citizens elect a mayor and board of commissioners as the town's governing body. The town manager is appointed by the board to serve as the chief operating officer administering all municipal affairs. The current mayor is Vivian A. Jones (R, term expires 2025) and the board of commissioners are James E. "Jim" Dyer (R, 2023), Nick Sliwinski (R, 2025), Chad D. Sary (R, 2023), R. Keith Shackleford (D, 2025), and Adam B. Wright (D, 2023).

A new town hall facility opened in downtown Wake Forest in September 2010, and was LEED Platinum certified in November 2011. All town departments are housed in the facility, except police (which has its own building nearby) and public works.

== Education ==
=== Primary and secondary education ===
The town is served by twelve public schools which are administered by the Wake County Public School System and Granville County Schools. Public schools include:

- G.C. Hawley Middle School
- Granville Early College High
- Heritage Elementary School
- Heritage High School
- Heritage Middle School
- Jones Dairy Elementary School
- Mount Energy Elementary
- Richland Creek Elementary School
- Wake Forest Elementary School
- Wake Forest High School
- Wake Forest Middle School

Charter schools include Franklin Academy (K–12), Wake Forest Charter Academy (K–8), Endeavor Charter School (K–8), and Envision Science Academy (K–8). Private schools include Thales Academy, All Saints Academy, and St. Catherine of Siena Catholic School, serving grades K–8. Wake Forest is also home to two Montessori schools: Wake Forest Montessori and Children's House of Wake Forest.

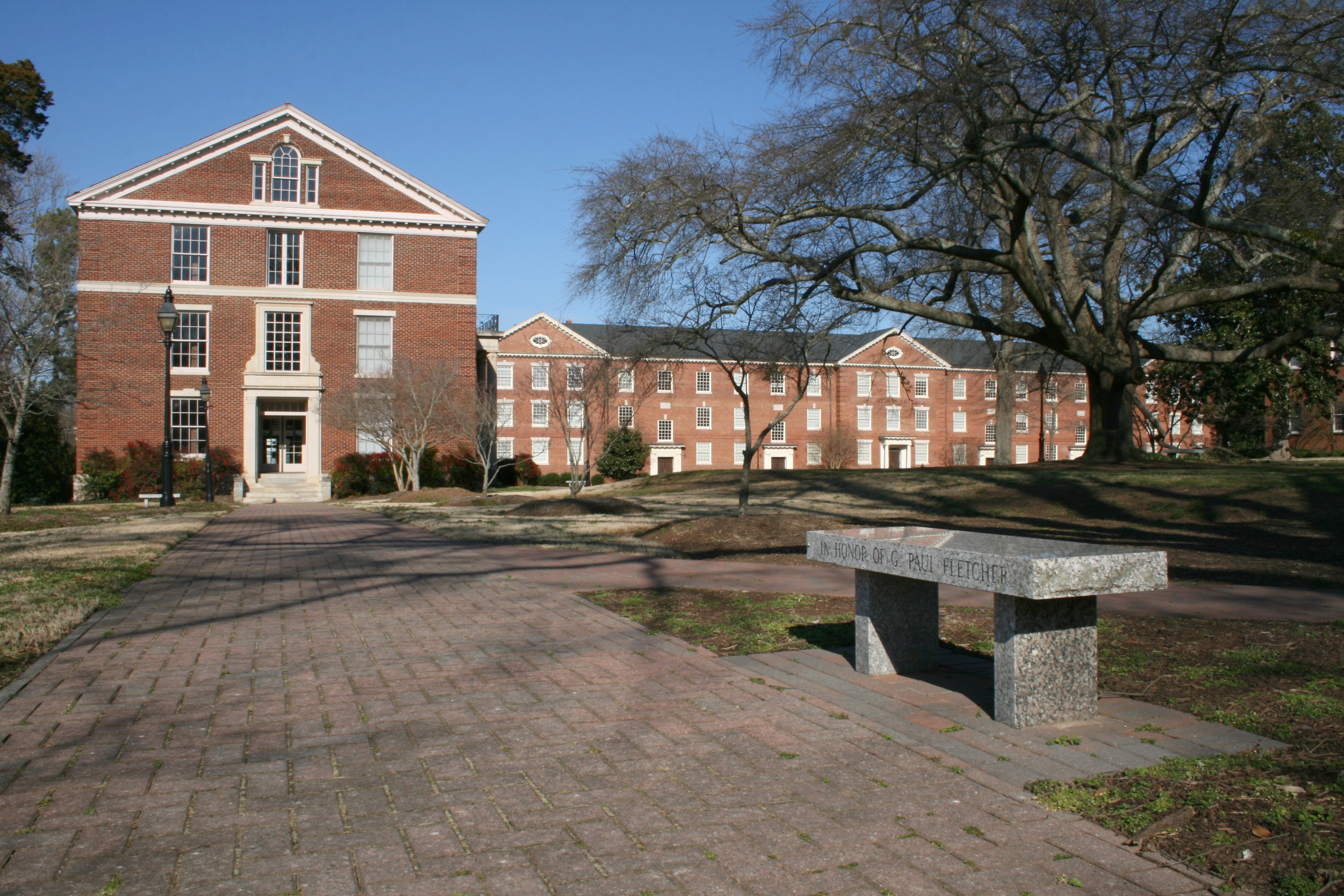
Southeastern Baptist Theological Seminary

=== Higher learning ===
Wake Technical Community College is an area two-year college with a north campus on Louisburg Road in Raleigh. Southeastern Baptist Theological Seminary is a seminary of the Southern Baptist Convention. It began offering classes in 1950 on the original campus of Wake Forest University and is commonly known by its acronym, SEBTS.

== Transportation ==
=== Passenger ===
- Air: Wake Forest is served by Raleigh-Durham International Airport, which is located 20 miles (32 km) southwest of the town in northwestern Wake County.
- Interstate Highway: Wake Forest can be accessed by I-85 and I-40. The town is located to the east of I-85 and north of I-40.
- Wake Forest is not currently served directly by passenger trains. Amtrak serves nearby Raleigh. NCDOT expects to extend the Piedmont service from Raleigh to a new Wake Forest train station by 2030 as part of the Raleigh-Richmond S-Line Project to build higher-speed rail between Raleigh and Richmond, Virginia. Ground breaking on the project began on July 1, 2024.
- Local bus: The Triangle Transit Authority operates buses that serve the region and connect to municipal bus systems in Raleigh, Durham, and Chapel Hill.

=== Roads ===
- Wake Forest is located off US 1 (also known as Capital Boulevard in northern Wake County), a major north–south U.S. Highway that serves the East Coast of the United States.
- Other highways that run through the area include NC 96 and NC 98.

== Media ==
=== On air ===
- WCPE-FM, located in Wake Forest, is a classical music station that provides its programming over the air, via the Internet, and via C-band and Ku-band satellite.

=== Newspaper ===
- The town's independently owned community newspaper, The Wake Weekly, has an average circulation of more than 8,400 copies per week.

=== Online ===
- Wake Forest News is a humor publication with the motto, "Half our news is fit to print".
- Wake Forest Today is the town's first digital daily news portal. It is an online news source that covers local news and events regarding Wake Forest and the surrounding area.
