= Como, North Carolina =

- Town
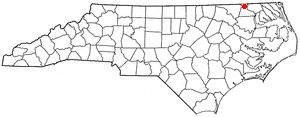
- Location of Como, North Carolina
- Coordinates: 36°30′04″N 77°00′26″W
- Country: United States
- State: North Carolina
- County: Hertford

Area
  - Total: 3.15 sq mi (8.17 km^{2})
  - Land: 3.15 sq mi (8.15 km^{2})
  - Water: 0.0077 sq mi (0.02 km^{2})
- Elevation: 72 ft (22 m)

Population (2020)
  - Total: 67
  - Density: 21.3/sq mi (8.22/km^{2})
- Time zone: UTC-5 (Eastern (EST))
  - Summer (DST): UTC-4 (EDT)
- ZIP code: 27818
- Area code: 252
- FIPS code: 37-14060
- GNIS feature ID: 2406303

Como is a town in Hertford County, North Carolina, United States. As of the 2020 census, Como had a population of 67.

== Geography ==
Como is located in northern Hertford County and U.S. Route 258 runs through the community, leading southwest 7 miles (11 km) to Murfreesboro and northeast 15 miles (24 km) to Franklin, Virginia.

According to the United States Census Bureau, Como has a total area of 3.2 square miles (8.2 km^{2}), of which 0.01 square miles (0.02 km^{2}), or 0.30%, are water.

== History ==
The town is notable for being the birthplace of Richard Gatling, inventor of the Gatling gun. The church he attended, Buckhorn Baptist Church, is still active today.

Another well-known resident was the hoodoo root doctor Jim Jordan, who died in the early 1960s. Jordan, who was African-American, was the subject of the biographical book The Fabled Dr. Jim Jordan written by F. Roy Johnson of nearby Murfreesboro.

Hare Plantation House, Riddick House, and Vernon Place are listed on the National Register of Historic Places.

== Demographics ==
Historical population
Census	Pop.	Note	%±
1970	211		—
1980	89		−57.8%
1990	71		−20.2%
2000	78		9.9%
2010	91		16.7%
2020	67		−26.4%
U.S. Decennial Census

=== Racial and ethnic composition ===
Como town, North Carolina – Racial and ethnic composition Note: the US Census treats Hispanic/Latino as an ethnic category. This table excludes Latinos from the racial categories and assigns them to a separate category. Hispanics/Latinos may be of any race.
Race / Ethnicity (NH = Non-Hispanic)	Pop 2000	Pop 2010	Pop 2020	% 2000	% 2010	% 2020
White alone (NH)	65	80	61	83.33%	87.91%	91.04%
Black or African American alone (NH)	13	7	0	16.67%	7.69%	0.00%
Native American or Alaska Native alone (NH)	0	0	0	0.00%	0.00%	0.00%
Asian alone (NH)	0	0	1	0.00%	0.00%	1.49%
Native Hawaiian or Pacific Islander alone (NH)	0	0	0	0.00%	0.00%	0.00%
Other race alone (NH)	0	0	1	0.00%	0.00%	1.49%
Mixed race or Multiracial (NH)	0	3	3	0.00%	3.30%	4.48%
Hispanic or Latino (any race)	0	1	1	0.00%	1.10%	1.49%
Total	78	91	67	100.00%	100.00%	100.00%

=== 2000 census ===
As of the census of 2000, there were 78 people, 35 households, and 22 families residing in the town. The population density was 23.3 people per square mile (9.0/km^{2}). There were 44 housing units at an average density of 13.1 per square mile (5.1/km^{2}). The racial makeup of the town was 83.33% White and 16.67% African American.

There were 35 households, out of which 20.0% had children under the age of 18 living with them, 57.1% were married couples living together, 8.6% had a female householder with no husband present, and 34.3% were non-families. 31.4% of all households were made up of individuals, and 20.0% had someone living alone who was 65 years of age or older. The average household size was 2.23 and the average family size was 2.78.

In the town, the population was spread out, with 17.9% under the age of 18, 5.1% from 18 to 24, 20.5% from 25 to 44, 38.5% from 45 to 64, and 17.9% who were 65 years of age or older. The median age was 46 years. For every 100 females, there were 95.0 males. For every 100 females age 18 and over, there were 88.2 males.

The median income for a household in the town was $31,250, and the median income for a family was $45,417. Males had a median income of $26,250 versus $18,750 for females. The per capita income for the town was $15,769. There were no families and 3.5% of the population living below the poverty line, including no under eighteens and 15.4% of those over 64.
