= Sloop Point =

Historic house in North Carolina, United States

- U.S. National Register of Historic Places

- Location within North Carolina Location within the United States
- Location: Intersection of Family Lane and SR 1561 (Sloop Point Road), near Vista, North Carolina
- Coordinates: 34°24′58″N 77°35′55″W
- Area: 4 acres (1.6 ha)
- Built: c. 1729
- Built by: Ashe, John Baptista
- NRHP reference No.: 72000985
- Added to NRHP: January 20, 1972

Sloop Point Plantation is a historic house located at Sloop Point, Pender County, North Carolina. It was built in 1729 according to dendrochronological dating, and is possibly the oldest surviving framed building in North Carolina. The house was built as a home for John Baptista Ashe and his wife Elizabeth Swann Ashe.

The building was added to the National Register of Historic Places in 1972.

== See also ==
- List of the oldest buildings in North Carolina
