= Carvers, North Carolina =

- Unincorporated community
- Location within North Carolina Location within the United States
- Coordinates: 34°27′40″N 78°24′49″W
- Country: United States
- State: North Carolina
- County: Bladen
- Elevation: 69 ft (21 m)
- Time zone: UTC-5 (Eastern (EST))
  - Summer (DST): UTC-4 (EDT)
- Area codes: 910, 472
- GNIS feature ID: 1006156

Carvers is an unincorporated community in Bladen County, North Carolina, United States.

== History ==
Oakland Plantation is listed on the National Register of Historic Places.
