= Lewis Wimbish Plantation =

Historic house in North Carolina, United States

- U.S. National Register of Historic Places
- U.S. Historic district
- Location within North Carolina Location within the United States
- Location: NC 1443, near Grassy Creek, North Carolina
- Coordinates: 36°31′21″N 78°35′22″W
- Area: 31 acres (13 ha)
- Built: c. 1850
- Architectural style: Greek Revival
- MPS: Granville County MPS
- NRHP reference No.: 88000418
- Added to NRHP: April 28, 1988

Lewis Wimbish Plantation was a historic tobacco plantation house and national historic district located near Grassy Creek, Granville County, North Carolina. The house was built about 1850, and was a two-story, three-bay, "T"-plan, heavy timber frame Greek Revival style dwelling. It had a low hipped roof and front portico with four round columns and two pilasters. Also on the property were the contributing privy, outbuilding, hipped roof barn, stable, corn crib, tobacco barn, chicken house, and overseer's house. It has been demolished.

It was listed on the National Register of Historic Places in 1988.
