= Oakland Plantation (Carvers, North Carolina) =

Historic house in North Carolina, United States

- U.S. National Register of Historic Places
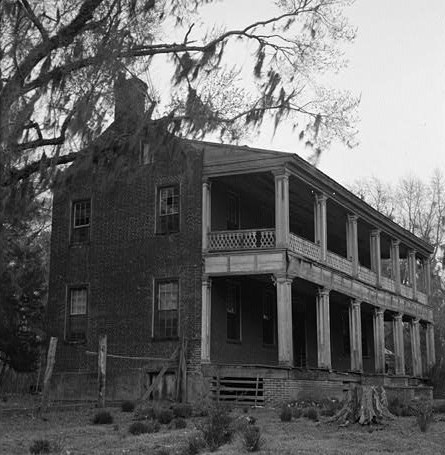
- Oakland

- Location within North Carolina Location within the United States
- Location: Off SR 1730, near Carvers, North Carolina
- Coordinates: 34°28′17″N 78°23′36″W
- Built: 1780
- Architect: Brown, Col. Thomas
- NRHP reference No.: 72000924
- Added to NRHP: April 25, 1972

Oakland Plantation, situated on a bluff overlooking the Cape Fear River in Carvers, Bladen County, North Carolina, was built over 200 years ago by General Thomas Brown, an American Revolutionary War patriot. It is one of a few houses of its period in North Carolina still being used today.

Listed on the National Register of Historic Places, Oakland depicts the architecture and skill of the artisans of that period. Bricks laid in Flemish bond were brought from England on sailing ships as ballast, transported up river, and unloaded by hand.

It was added to the National Register of Historic Places in 1972.

== See also ==
- List of Registered Historic Places in North Carolina
