= Dr. Calvin Jones House =

Historic house in North Carolina, United States

- U.S. National Register of Historic Places
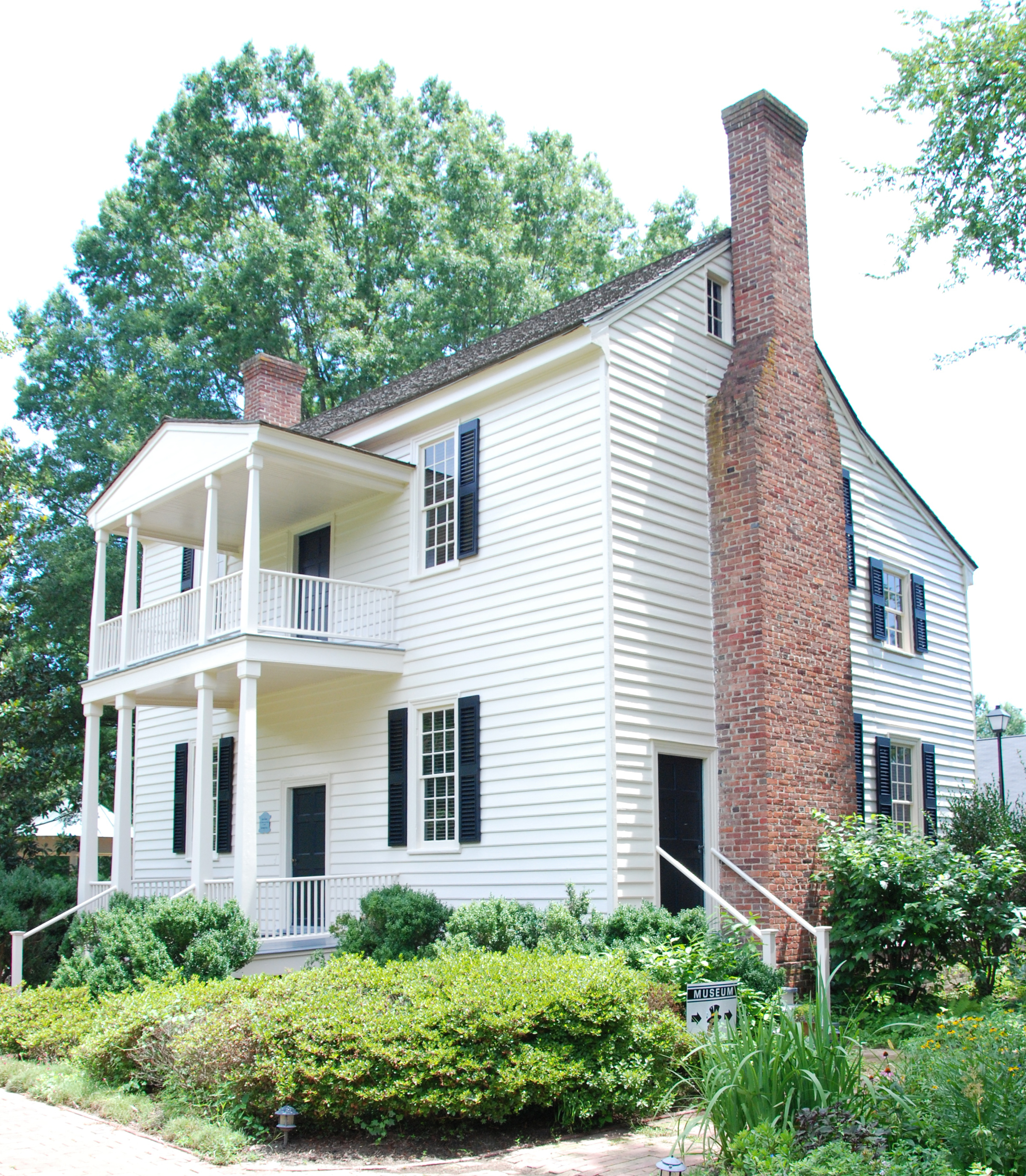

- Location within North Carolina
- Location: 414 N. Main St, Wake Forest, North Carolina
- Coordinates: 35°59′3″N 78°30′27″W
- Area: 4.5 acres (1.8 ha)
- Built: 1820
- Architectural style: Federal
- NRHP reference No.: 16000880
- Added to NRHP: December 20, 2016

Dr. Calvin Jones House, is a historic plantation home located in Wake Forest, Wake County, North Carolina. It was built around 1820, and is a two-story, two-bay deep, three-bay wide, frame house covered with beaded weatherboard.

== History ==
The house was originally owned by Dr. Calvin Jones who was a physician and the mayor (then called Intendant of Police) of Raleigh, North Carolina. The house has been moved three times. The house was first moved around 1835 approximately 50 yards west. The second move around 1842 moved the house approximately 100 yards west. The third move was in 1956 after it was threatened to be demolished to make room for a new cafeteria. The third move was funded by Wake Forest College and moved it to the current 4.5-acre lot.

It was listed on the National Register of Historic Places in 2016. The house is now part of the Wake Forest Historical Museum.
