= Hare Plantation House =

Historic house in North Carolina, United States

- U.S. National Register of Historic Places
- Location within North Carolina Location within the United States
- Location: 1.6 miles (2.6 km) west of the junction of SR 1317 and US 258, near Como, North Carolina
- Coordinates: 36°30′21″N 77°2′22″W
- Area: 8 acres (3.2 ha)
- Built: c. 1815
- Architectural style: Greek Revival, Vernacular Greek Revival
- NRHP reference No.: 71000588
- Added to NRHP: February 18, 1971

Hare Plantation House is a historic plantation house located near Como, Hertford County, North Carolina. It is dated to about 1815 and is a two-story, three-bay, gable-roofed frame dwelling with Greek Revival style design elements. It features a three-bay pedimented porch, supported by four square columns.

It was listed on the National Register of Historic Places in 1971.
