= Thompson House (Wake Forest, North Carolina) =

Historic house in North Carolina, United States

- U.S. National Register of Historic Places
- Location within North Carolina Location within the United States
- Location: 2528 Old NC Highway 98, near Wake Forest, North Carolina
- Coordinates: 35°58′10″N 78°34′8″W
- Area: 2.1 acres (0.85 ha)
- Built: c. 1853
- Architectural style: Greek Revival
- NRHP reference No.: 05001030
- Added to NRHP: September 15, 2005

Thompson House, also known as the William Thompson House, is a historic plantation house located near Wake Forest, Wake County, North Carolina. It was built about 1853, and is a two-story, three-bay Greek Revival-style frame dwelling. It is sheathed in weatherboard, sits on a fieldstone foundation, and has four brick chimneys, two on each side. Also on the property is a contributing 1 1/2-story barn (c. 1853). The house and barn were moved to its present location in 2004.

It was listed on the National Register of Historic Places in 2005.
