= Oakforest =

Historic house in North Carolina, United States

- U.S. National Register of Historic Places
- Location within North Carolina Location within the United States
- Location: 9958 Seawell Dr., Wake Forest, North Carolina
- Coordinates: 35°56′32″N 78°31′26″W
- Area: 6.86 acres (2.78 ha)
- Built: 1807
- Architectural style: Greek Revival, Federal
- NRHP reference No.: 98000689
- Added to NRHP: 11 June 1998

Oakforest is a two-story, frame composite house in the Federal and Greek-Revival style, located in Wake Forest, North Carolina. It was placed on the National Register of Historic Places on 11 June 1998.

The property is on a 6.86-acre (0.03 km^{2}; 0.01 sq mi) site that is the residual portion of a 200-acre (0.81 km^{2}; 0.31 sq mi) plantation begun in the first decade of the nineteenth century by John Smith. In 1803 John Smith was deeded this tract by his father, Benjamin Smith, and began construction. A map on a 1791 Land Grant shows that the tract contains a 51-acre (0.21 km^{2}; 0.08 sq mi) tract granted to Benjamin Smith.

Surrounded by mid-twentieth-century houses, Oakforest is an oasis of rare historical value. The tract contains three remaining original structures, including the Oakforest dwelling house, the core of the plantation, the mid-nineteenth-century smokehouse, and the early nineteenth-century corn crib. The unfenced, gently sloping tract, the small stream with its border of wild foliage, the old trees and mid-nineteenth-century boxwoods combine to retain much of the original rural atmosphere. A unique feature is the American boxwood allee which lines the original front drive. The boxwoods were thought to be planted prior to the American Civil War as they can be seen in the earliest known picture taken in 1886.

In 2008, it was designated a local historic landmark property by the Town of Wake Forest, North Carolina.

There is a cemetery on the grounds, the resting place of members of the family who lived in the house.

== See also ==
- List of Registered Historic Places in North Carolina
