= Purefoy–Dunn Plantation =

Historic farm in North Carolina, United States

- U.S. National Register of Historic Places
- U.S. Historic district
- Location within North Carolina Location within the United States
- Location: East side US 1, 0.3 miles (0.48 km) north of US 1A, near Wake Forest, North Carolina
- Coordinates: 35°57′32″N 78°32′19″W
- Area: 185 acres (75 ha)
- Built: c. 1814, c. 1850
- Architectural style: Greek Revival
- NRHP reference No.: 88000238
- Added to NRHP: March 24, 1988

Purefoy–Dunn Plantation is a historic plantation and national historic district located near Wake Forest, Wake County, North Carolina. The Greek Revival style plantation house was built about 1814 and remodeled about 1850. It is a two-story, L-shaped, heavy timber frame building. It has a low hipped roof and is sheathed in clapboards. The front portico was removed in the 1960s or early 1970s. Also on the property is a contributing mid-19th century gable-roofed frame smokehouse.

== Historical background ==
John Purefoy was born in Craven County, North Carolina, in 1778. A brief biography of Purefoy in the Wake Forest student indicated that he was orphaned at the age of twelve and went to live with relatives in Georgia, where he was later converted and began his career as a Baptist minister [Sikes: p. 19]. It is not clear precisely when Purefoy moved back to North Carolina, but by 1809 he was listed as paying taxes on 40.75 acres of land and two enslaved people in the Forest District of Wake County [we Tax List: 1809]. He served as pastor of several churches in the Forestville-Wake Forest area until the late 1830s when he moved to Cumberland (later Harnett) County, the home of his second wife, Isabella Atkins whom he had married in 1833 [Sikes: p. 19; Index]

In 1814, Purefoy purchased a 400-acre tract of land near Forestville from Nathaniel (White Plains) Jones [deed book Y: p. 49]. It seems likely that he built his residence on the land shortly thereafter. Purefoy apparently did not engage in extensive farming, as he never enslaved more than four people. [WC Tax List: 1809-1830; Wynn: p. 221].

Although not formally educated himself, Rev. Purefoy was a strong advocate of education throughout his life. Included among his endeavors in the field was his service as a founder and trustee of the Macedonian Academy in nearby Forestville.

Ten years later, Purefoy joined with William R. Hinton, Simon G. Jeffreys, Jr., and James G. Hall to purchase 615.5 acres of land northeast of Forestville from Calvin Jones, who had been operating the Wake Forest school on the site for several years [deed book: 14: p. 191; and "Wake Forest school"). The following month, plans were announced to open the Wake Forest Institute in February 1833. From this institution developed Wake Forest College; today, Wake Forest University is one of the foremost church-related institutions of higher learning in the country.

John Purefoy remained a trustee of the school until his death in 1855 ["Death of an Aged Minister"]. He was also noted for a hymnal published in 1831, A Selection of Hymns and Spiritual Songs, in Two Parts. Of his four children, three were'also prominent ministersln the Baptist church -George W., Nicholas A. and James S. Purefoy. Nicholas Purefoy wrote a history of the Sandy Creek Baptist Association [Taylor: p. 246]. James, who presented an address on the college's semi-centennial celebration, was a trustee for forty-five years.

In 1838, Purefoy sold his 429-acre farm to Samuel H. Dunn, a Wake County native and son of Benjamin A. Dunn, a prominent area planter and mill owner [deed book 13: p. 170; and Will Book 28: p. 141]. At some time during the next twenty years, the new owner added a two-story wing to the earlier house and remodeled the entire house in the Greek Revival style.

Samuel Dunn, in contrast to John Purefoy, engaged in a substantial farming operation; the principal products were wheat, corn, oats, cotton, wool, and swine. The proportions of improved land and unimproved woodland varied considerably, but in 1860, when Dunn was listed in the census as enslaving 24 people, he was working 500 acres of his plantation.

The North Carolina Joint Stock Land Bank of Durham owned the property until 1942 when it was acquired by Dr. Zebulon Marvin Caveness, sr., who carried out a dairy farming operation on the plantation [deed book 889: p. 287]. Dr. Caveness deeded the plantation to his son William F. Caveness in 1955 [deed book 1226: p. 181].

The district was listed on the National Register of Historic Places in 1988.
