= Shelton Plantation House =

Historic house in North Carolina, United States

- U.S. National Register of Historic Places
- Location within North Carolina Location within the United States
- Location: Off NC 32, near Edenton, North Carolina
- Coordinates: 36°4′56″N 76°37′47″W
- Area: 15 acres (6.1 ha)
- Built: c. 1820
- Architectural style: Temple form
- NRHP reference No.: 74001342
- Added to NRHP: October 29, 1974

Shelton Plantation House, also known as Hoskins House, is a historic plantation house located near Edenton, Chowan County, North Carolina. It was built about 1820, and is a two-story, three-bay, Federal-period temple-form frame dwelling. It has a small pedimented entrance porch.

It was listed on the National Register of Historic Places in 1976.
