= Powell House (Wake Forest, North Carolina) =

Historic house in North Carolina, United States

- U.S. National Register of Historic Places
- Location within North Carolina Location within the United States
- Location: Southwest of Wake Forest off US 1, near Wake Forest, North Carolina
- Coordinates: 35°55′24″N 78°32′33″W
- Area: 9 acres (3.6 ha)
- Built: c. 1800
- Architectural style: Federal
- NRHP reference No.: 74001381
- Added to NRHP: October 15, 1974

Powell House is a historic plantation home located near Wake Forest, Wake County, North Carolina, USA. It was built about 1800, and is a large two-story, five-bay, Federal-style frame dwelling. The house has two one-story rear additions and exterior end chimneys. The front facade features a full height portico added about 1940.

It was listed on the National Register of Historic Places in 1974.
