= Walnut Hill Historic District (Carnesville, Georgia) =

Historic district in Georgia, United States

- U.S. National Register of Historic Places
- U.S. Historic district
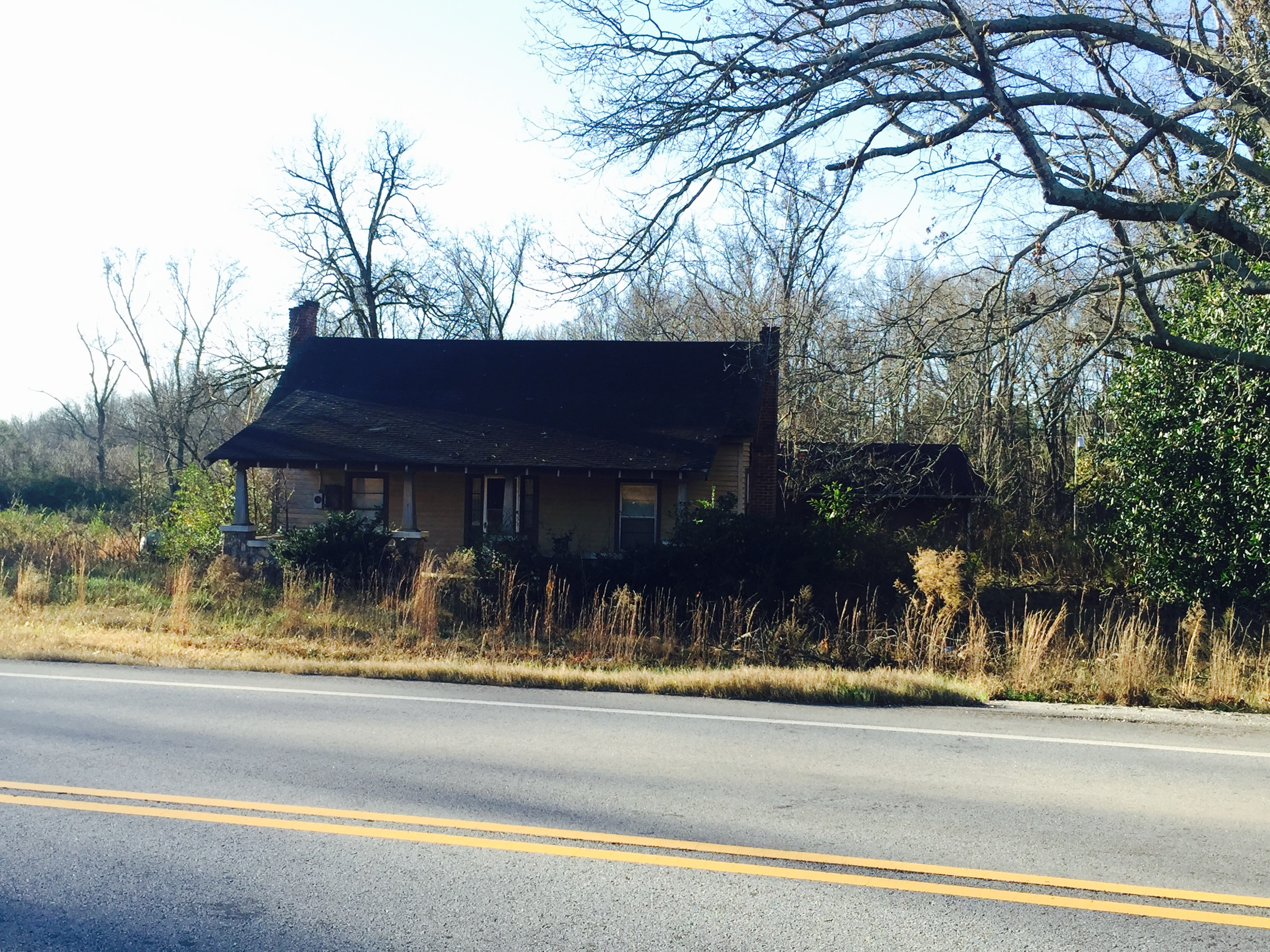

- Location within Georgia Location within the United States
- Nearest city: Carnesville, Georgia
- Coordinates: 34°21′23″N 83°20′34″W
- Built: 1850
- Architectural style: Bungalow/Craftsman, central hall
- MPS: Old Federal Road in Georgia's Banks and Franklin Counties MPS
- NRHP reference No.: 96001296
- Added to NRHP: November 7, 1996

Walnut Hill Historic District in Carnesville, Georgia consists of several small farm complexes along Old Federal Road (now Georgia State Route 51) making a historic rural linear community. The oldest dates from 1850. It includes farmhouses of types that are common for rural Georgia from c.1850 to c. 1910 and various outbuildings. Most of the farms were small subsistence farms which grew corn, vegetables, oats, and wheat, plus some cotton as a cash crop.

The district includes the graveyard of Indian Creek Baptist Church, which was founded in 1850. Many of the community members were of the Hamilton or Payne families. It includes a historic store and a doctor's office.

It was listed on the National Register of Historic Places in 1996.
