= Oaky Grove =

Historic house in North Carolina, United States

- U.S. National Register of Historic Places
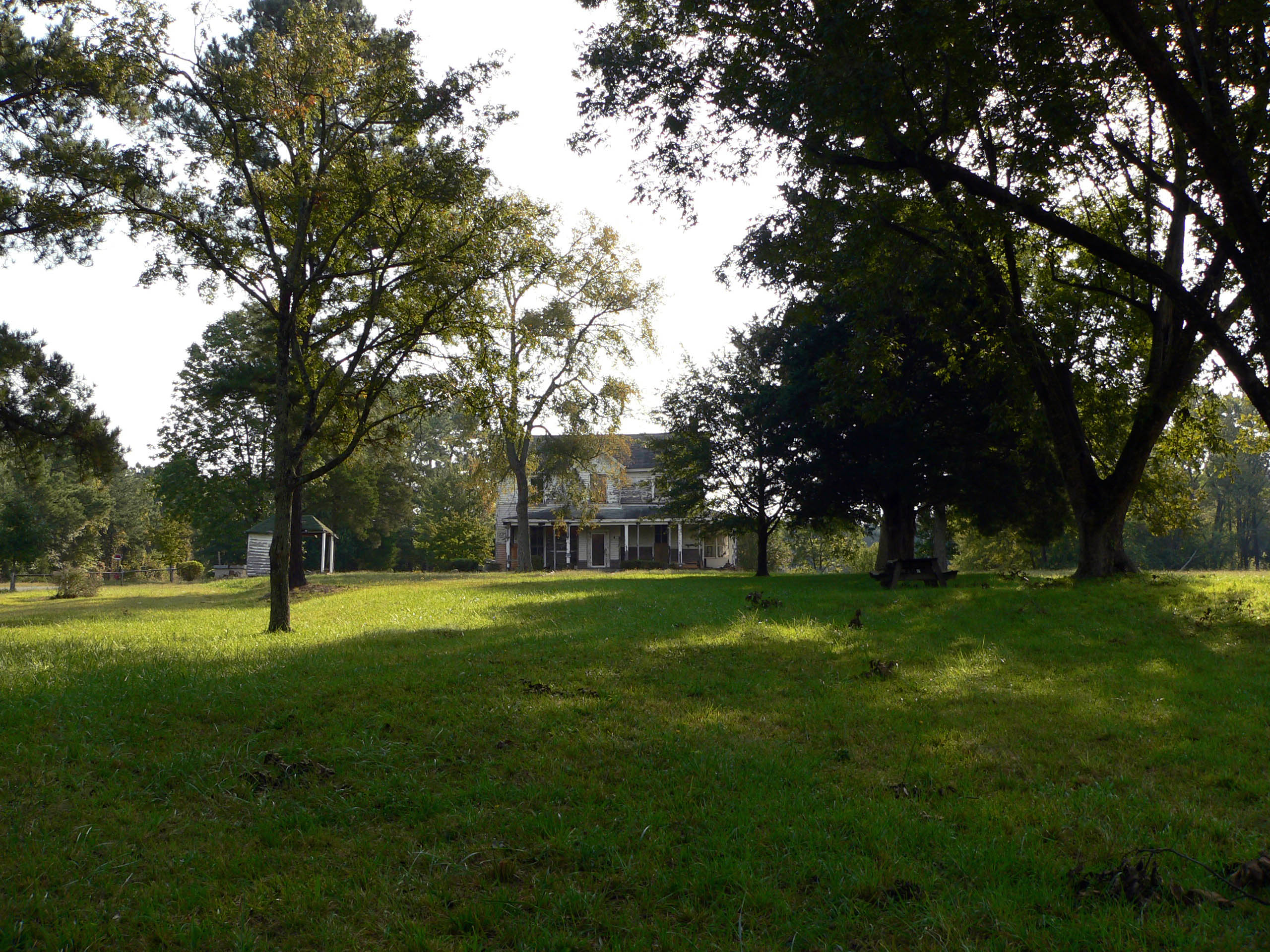
- Oaky Grove viewed from the west

- Location within North Carolina Location within the United States
- Nearest city: Shotwell, North Carolina
- Coordinates: 35°44′24.80″N 78°26′24.63″W
- Area: 28.2 acres (11.4 ha)
- Built: 1818
- Architect: Thomas Price
- Architectural style: Federal
- MPS: Wake County MPS
- NRHP reference No.: 93001021
- Added to NRHP: September 30, 1993

Oaky Grove is a historic house located in Shotwell, Wake County, North Carolina, a suburb of Raleigh. Built in 1818 by Thomas Price, Oaky Grove has been home to generations of the Price, Blake, and Doub families. Before the Civil War, the Price plantation consisted of 4,500 acres (1,800 ha) of farm land. Today, the 28-acre (11 ha) property is owned by the Doubs family and contains the two-story Federal style home, a smokehouse, barn, and the family cemetery.

In September 1993, Oaky Grove was listed on the National Register of Historic Places.

== See also ==
- List of Registered Historic Places in North Carolina
