= Boylan Heights =

- U.S. National Register of Historic Places
- U.S. Historic district
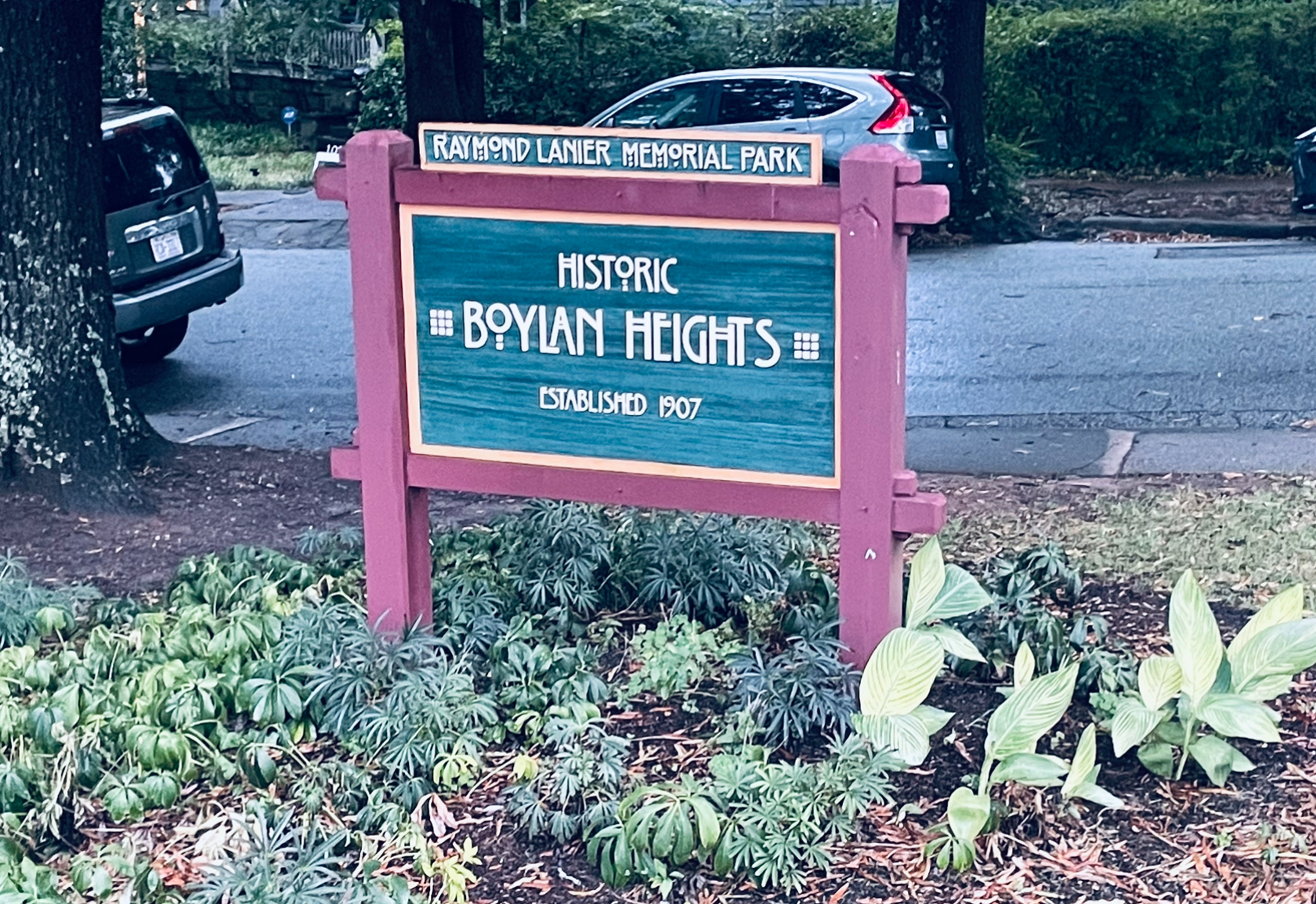
- Boylan Heights entrance sign monument in Raymond Lanier Memorial Park

- Location within North Carolina Location within the United States
- Location: Roughly bounded by Norfolk & Southern RR, Mountford, Martin, and Florence Sts. and Dorothea Dr., Raleigh, North Carolina
- Coordinates: 35°46′26″N 78°39′7″W
- Area: 82 acres (33 ha)
- Built: 1907–1935
- Architect: Multiple
- Architectural style: Bungalow/Craftsman, Colonial, Queen Anne
- MPS: Early Twentieth Century Raleigh Neighborhoods TR
- NRHP reference No.: 85001671
- Added to NRHP: July 29, 1985

Boylan Heights is one of eight historic neighborhoods surrounding downtown Raleigh, North Carolina. Developed in the early 20th century it was one of the earliest planned suburbs in the city. From its apex at Montfort Hall, the neighborhood slopes gradually south-east towards Western Boulevard. After petitions from residents, the neighborhood was added to the National Register of Historic Places as a historic district on July 29, 1985.

The national historic district encompasses 252 contributing buildings and was developed between 1907 and about 1935. It includes notable examples of Queen Anne, Colonial Revival, and Bungalow / American Craftsman style architecture.

== History ==
=== Boylan Family 1818–1907 ===
Boylan Heights is named after the Boylan family, who first moved to Raleigh in 1799. Originally from a prominent family in New Jersey, William M. Boylan Sr. moved to Halifax, North Carolina to work for his uncle sometime before 1797. After a short relocation to Fayetteville in 1797, the pair moved to the newly created state capital to publish Federalist Party newspapers, the North Carolina Minerva and Raleigh Advisor.

In 1818 Boylan Sr. purchased 197 acres of land for $3,000, which included what was the mainhouse of Wakefield Plantation, formerly owned by Raleigh and Wake County founding father Joel Lane. Along with his first wife Elizabeth Stokes McCulloch, who died in 1825 and his second wife Jane Elliot, he would live in the Joel Lane House until he died in 1861.

Boylan Sr. deeded his son William M. Boylan Jr. 100 acres in 1855. The boundary for the newly divided track was less than a quarter-mile away from the Joel Lane House. Three years later Boylan Jr. hired English architect, William Percival and Raleigh builder Thomas H. Briggs Sr. Construction of Montfort Hall started shortly thereafter and was completed by 1858.

With the outbreak of the Civil War, William Boylan Jr. permitted Confederate units to use the grounds of his estate. Notably, the Ellis Light Artillery was opened to the grounds for encampment and training.

When Union soldiers set up camp at Dorothea Dix Hospital in April 1865, as many as 30,000 soldiers scattered across the hospital's campus, with some spilling over onto Boylan Jr's land. Montfort Hall was one of the few surviving grand mansions left in Raleigh from the pre-Civil War era.

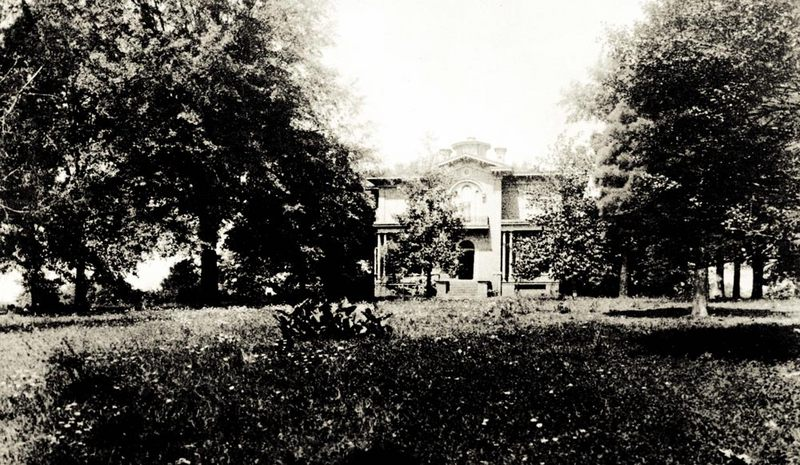
William Boylan Jr's Montfort Hall Circa 1900. Courtesy of State Archives of North Carolina

Following William Boylan Jr's death in 1899, the property passed to his wife, Mary, along with the majority of his holdings. When she passed two years later, she bequeathed Montfort Hall to her children. She stated in her will that it was her wish that her own son would purchase the home from his siblings and take care of it for the rest of his life.

William Boylan Jr. 's heirs sold the house and its surrounding 180 acres to the Greater Raleigh Land Company for $48,000 on June 15, 1907. Fourteen heirs had a claim to a share of the property, including four minors who were represented by their guardian.

=== Greater Raleigh Land Company 1907–1915 ===
The early 20th Century saw rapid expansion for Raleigh. Struggling farmers abandoned their land, moving to urban areas including Ashville, Durham, Charlotte, Burlington, High Point, and Raleigh. Industries in these cities provided them with new opportunities and the excitement of city life. In turn creating a housing crisis that inspired real estate firms across the state to plot suburban developments. William Boylan's 100+ acre plantation was a perfect location. Only a ten-minute walk from North Carolina's Capital Building, a short distance from Pullen Park, and just outside of the then-city limits to ensure privacy and tranquility.

Raleigh Real Estate & Trust Company oversaw a handful of these developments on the outskirts of the city. Cameron Park, and Historic Glenwood near Five Points were developed at the same time. For the Boylan Heights project, twelve partners came together to form the Greater Raleigh Land Company, including Thomas Henery Briggs Jr. whose father helped build Montfort Hall in the 1850s. According to the company's certification of incorporation, their object was "to buy land in large quantity and subdivide the land into lots and sell them." Many members of the group had either familiar or political connections to civic leaders. In practice, the company worked as a subsidiary of the Raleigh Real Estate & Trust Co.

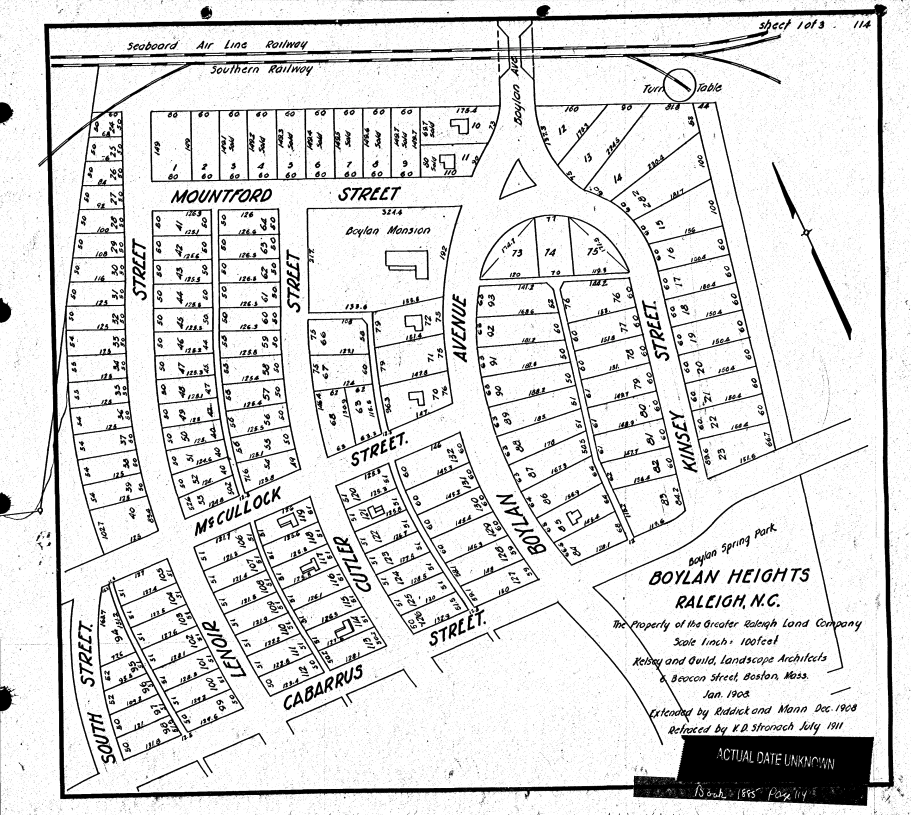
Recorded plot map of Boylan Heights circa 1908

Frank K. Ellington who served as the president of both companies and his partner J. Stanhope Wynne carefully planned Boylan Heights with a vision of its future character and social composition. Using restrictive covenants they set a minimum construction value for each lot, with the highest value required on Boylan Avenue alongside the renamed Boylan Mansion.

Lot 72 to the immediate left of the mansion was sold to A.I. Kaplan for $900 in 1909, requiring at least a $3,000 home to be constructed. Lot 150, further down Boylan Ave. between Cabarrus Street & South Street was sold to J.A. Scott in the same year for $450. Mr. Scott was obligated to spend at least $2,000 constructing his home. Both houses need to sit at least twenty feet back from the front of their lots. Further away from the top of the neighborhood lot 215 was sold to Albert Finnell in 1913 for "$100 and other valuable consideration." He agreed to spend at least $1,000 in constructing his house.

As a result of the restrictions, lots on Boylan Ave. have large front lawns, many featuring wide porches. The rest of the development is a collection of smaller lots with little if any yard space.

Also included in the deed restrictions was an attempt to keep the neighborhood segregated. Every deed included a clause that barred black people from becoming residents. "The premises shall not be occupied by negros or a person of mixed or negro blood; Provided, that this shall not be construed to prevent the living upon the premises of any negro servant whose time is employed for domestic purposes by the occupants of the dwelling-home."

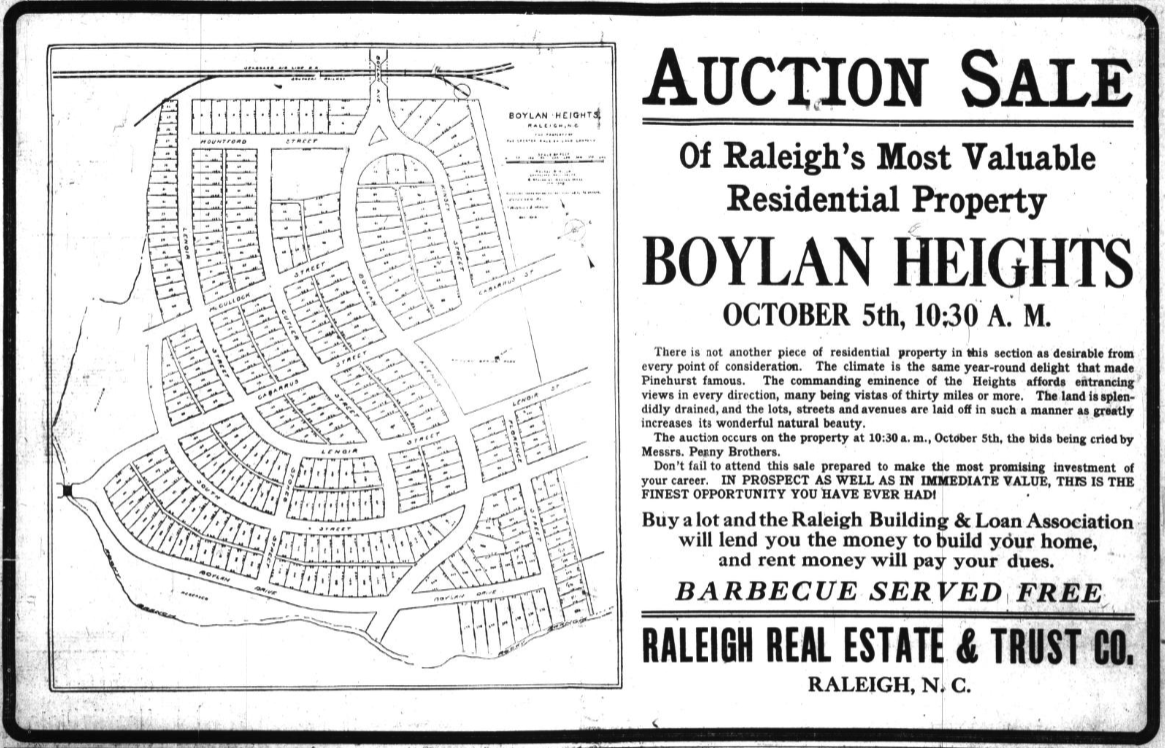
Ad for Boylan Heights Neighborhood placed in Wake County Newspapers in 1909

Boylan Heights was marketed as the highest point in Raleigh. Perfect for builders, investors, or families. A large lot was set aside for Boylan Spring Park, though it would later be developed as a school for the neighborhood's children. An advertisement from 1909 instructed citizens to "let the pennies pay for a beautiful lot [in] Boylan Heights." It further claimed that if you could save just fifty cents a day for a few months you'd be able to afford one of the desirable lots.

As part of their marketing for the new development Greater Raleigh Land Company donated a lot valued at $700 to be actioned off at the 1908 Masonic Carnival. G.N. Walters was reported as the winner of the action, though there is no evidence the lot was ever deeded to him.

Once all of the development's lots were sold in 1915 The Greater Raleigh Land Company dissolved. Two remaining lots, one intended to be Boylan Spring Park and the other a triangular lot at the corner of Kinsey Street and Boylan Avenue were deeded to The Boylan Heights Improvement Association for $10. The association was given the lots to hold in trust for the use and benefit of all property owners within Boylan Heights.

=== Pre-war Era 1917 – Great Depression ===
For the first decade of development, the original vision of an economically diverse community looked to be a reality. Property records show Frank M. Jolly, owner and operator of Jolly Jeweler which closed after 130 years in 2011 lived across the street from Montfort Hall. Descending down Boylan Avenue where many other self-employed white-collar workers. In contrast, residents of Cutler and Stokes worked blue-collar jobs.

Enough families moved in to justify the construction of a local school in the mid-1920s. On April 28, 1926, a meeting of the Boylan Heights Improvement Association voted in favor of selling the lot reserved for Boylan Spring Park to the then-town of Raleigh for the sum of $1 with the requirement that the land only be used as a school. If the City of Raleigh, now Wake County Public Schools ever stops using the land as a school it would return to the Improvement Association. On the 20th of the same month Raleigh voters approved a school bond that called for a six-grade school house with an auditorium to be built in the lot.

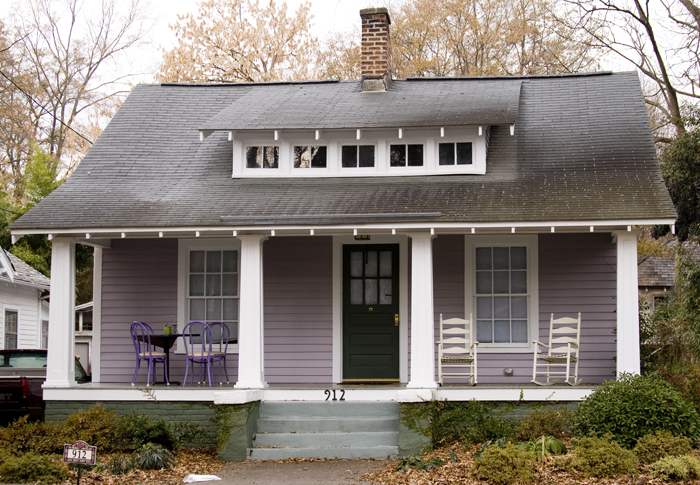
Typical one story, craftsman, bungalow found in the neighborhood

Raleigh was not immune to the Great Depression. As manufacturing output dropped along with textile wages, unemployment rose and many of Boylan Heights' blue-collar residents became unable to afford their homes. Others turned their homes into apartments in an effort to save their land.

When economic trends started looking up white-collar voters flocked out of the neighborhood allowing their homes to become apartments or leaving them vacant.

=== Post-war Era – Current ===
According to residents at the time who were interviewed for the 1980 application for historical designation, by the 1940s absent landlords and vacant homes became common within Boylan Heights. Once the grandest home in Boylan Height, Montfort Hall itself was turned into apartments from 1948 to 1953 until eventually being left vacant.

Entering the 1960s Boylan Heights transitioned into a wholly working-class neighborhood. Flanked by Norfolk South railroad tracks to the North, Central Prison to the East, and Dorothea Dix Hospital to the South a disconnect formed between the neighborhood and the rest of the city.

It was not until the late 1970s that revitalization efforts within the community took hold. Led by the owners of Montfort Hall, then operating as Boylan Heights Baptist Church, who applied for registration as a National Historic Landmark. Five years before the neighborhood submitted an application of its own.

== Culture and Community ==
=== Annual events ===
The neighborhood's most prominent event is the Boylan Heights Art Walk, held annually since 1992 on the first Sunday of December. The event transforms front porches, lawns, and driveways into an open-air gallery for over 100 regional artists and craftspeople.

=== Project 303 DIY Skatepark and Memorial ===
In March 2023, a community-built "DIY" skatepark known as Project 303 was established on an abandoned railroad bridge near the neighborhood's eastern boundary with Central Prison. Built entirely by local volunteers with private funds and labor, the park serves as both a recreational space and a memorial "shrine" to deceased figures in the skateboarding community.

The park is characterized by hand-built concrete ramps and a memorial wall featuring 28 names of "fallen heroes" of the sport, set within painted stone arches and decorated with handmade mosaics of seashells and colored glass. Notable individuals memorialized at the site include:

- Patti McGee: The first female professional skateboarder and a 1960s icon.
- Ignacio Echeverría: Known as the "Skateboard Hero," who died intervening in the 2017 London Bridge terrorist attack.
- Alec Chambers: A prominent North Carolina professional skater who died in late 2025.
- Johnny Romano: The youngest-ever professional skater, who passed away in 2008.

While the park was inspired by the local "DIY" culture of the former Graveside DIY, an unsanctioned park that operated in Raleigh until its closure on December 31, 2023, Project 303 is distinct in its specific focus as a "secret sanctuary" and a place for memorialization.

== In Media ==
Boylan Heights was explored in the book Everything Sings: Maps for a Narrative Atlas which maps the neighborhood in unusual ways. Maps include the location of jack-o'-lanterns on porches, radio waves permeating the air, the light from street lamps, and other attributes of Boylan Heights that cannot be mapped in a traditional way. The book was written by resident and critical cartographer Denis Wood.

Indy pop/rock band and Raleigh nativities, The Connells named their second album Boylan Heights after the neighborhood in 1987.

== Notable structures ==
- Montfort Hall, built for William Montfort Boylan in 1858
- Walter Woolcott House, built for its namesake in 1909.

== Notable residents ==
- Denis Wood, widely reviewed former North Carolina State University professor of Design
- Charles Meeker, former mayor of Raleigh, NC
- Deborah K. Ross, Representative for North Carolina's 2nd congressional district, formerly served in the NC General Assembly and as director of the ACLU of NC
- Janet Cowell, Mayor of Raleigh, former North Carolina State Senator, and 27th Treasurer of North Carolina.

== See also ==
- List of Registered Historic Places in North Carolina
- Montfort Hall
