= City Cemetery (Raleigh, North Carolina) =

Historic cemetery in Wake County, North Carolina, US

- U.S. National Register of Historic Places
- U.S. Historic district
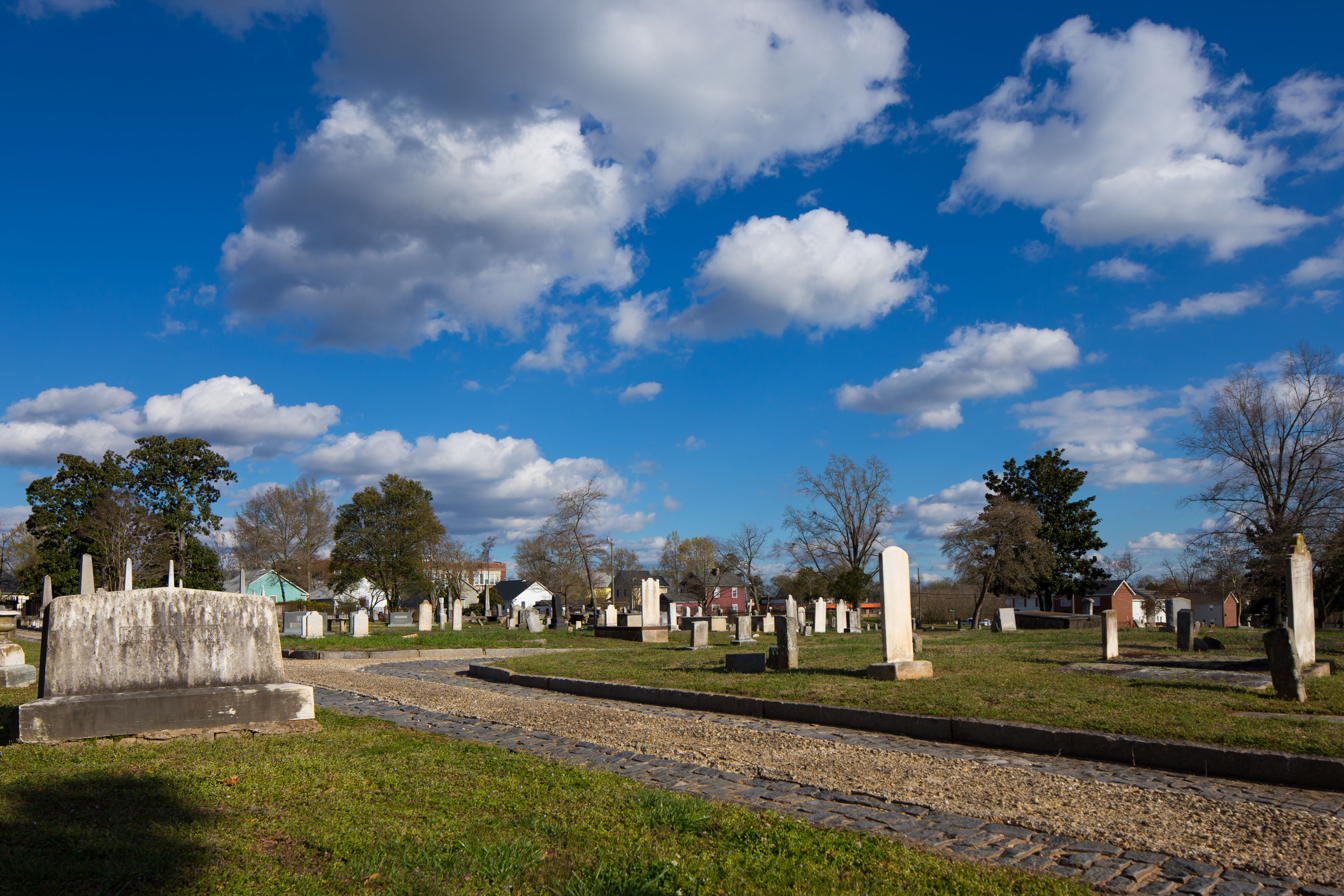

- Location within North Carolina Location within the United States
- Location: 17 S. East St., Raleigh, North Carolina
- Coordinates: 35°46′45″N 78°37′51″W
- Area: 7.5 acres (3.0 ha)
- Built: 1798
- Architect: Stronach, William; et al.
- NRHP reference No.: 08000889
- Added to NRHP: September 12, 2008

The City Cemetery of Raleigh, also known as Old City Cemetery, was authorized in 1798 by the North Carolina General Assembly as Raleigh's first burying ground. It was laid out on 4 acres (1.6 ha) of land just outside the original 1792 eastern boundary of Raleigh and bounded by East Street on the west, East Hargett Street on the south, and Morgan Street on the north. It was originally laid out in four equal quarters with the northern two quarters reserved for residents, the southwestern for visitors, and the southeastern for Negroes, both free and slaves. Over time, the cemetery has gradually been enlarged toward New Bern Street in 1819, 1849, and 1856 and now contains approximately 7.5 acres (3.0 ha). The cemetery was enclosed in 1898 by a cast-iron fence that was formerly around Union Square to keep straying livestock out of the State Capitol grounds. A network of cobblestone driveways with granite curbstones run through the cemetery. In 1857, the city boundaries were extended to include the cemetery, and the city charter provided for a resident caretaker. Many persons of Raleigh's and North Carolina's early period are interred at City Cemetery including governors, mayors, politicians, newspaper editors, military officers, ministers, doctors, planters, attorneys, bankers, and Scottish and English stonemasons who helped build the Capitol.

City Cemetery was listed on the National Register of Historic Places on 12 September 2008.

== Historic grave sites ==
- Joel Lane
- Jacob Johnson
- John Rex
- Joseph Gales
- Weston R. Gales
- John Devereux
- William Boylan
- Thomas Meredith
- William Peace
- Governor Charles Manly
- William Henry Haywood
- Dr. Josiah Ogden Watson
- Romulus M. Saunders
- William White
- Sion Hart Rogers
- Colonel William Polk
- General Lawrence O. Branch
- General William A. Blount
- Richard Hines
- Absalom Tatom
- William Shaw
- William Hill
- Anna J. Cooper

== Gallery ==
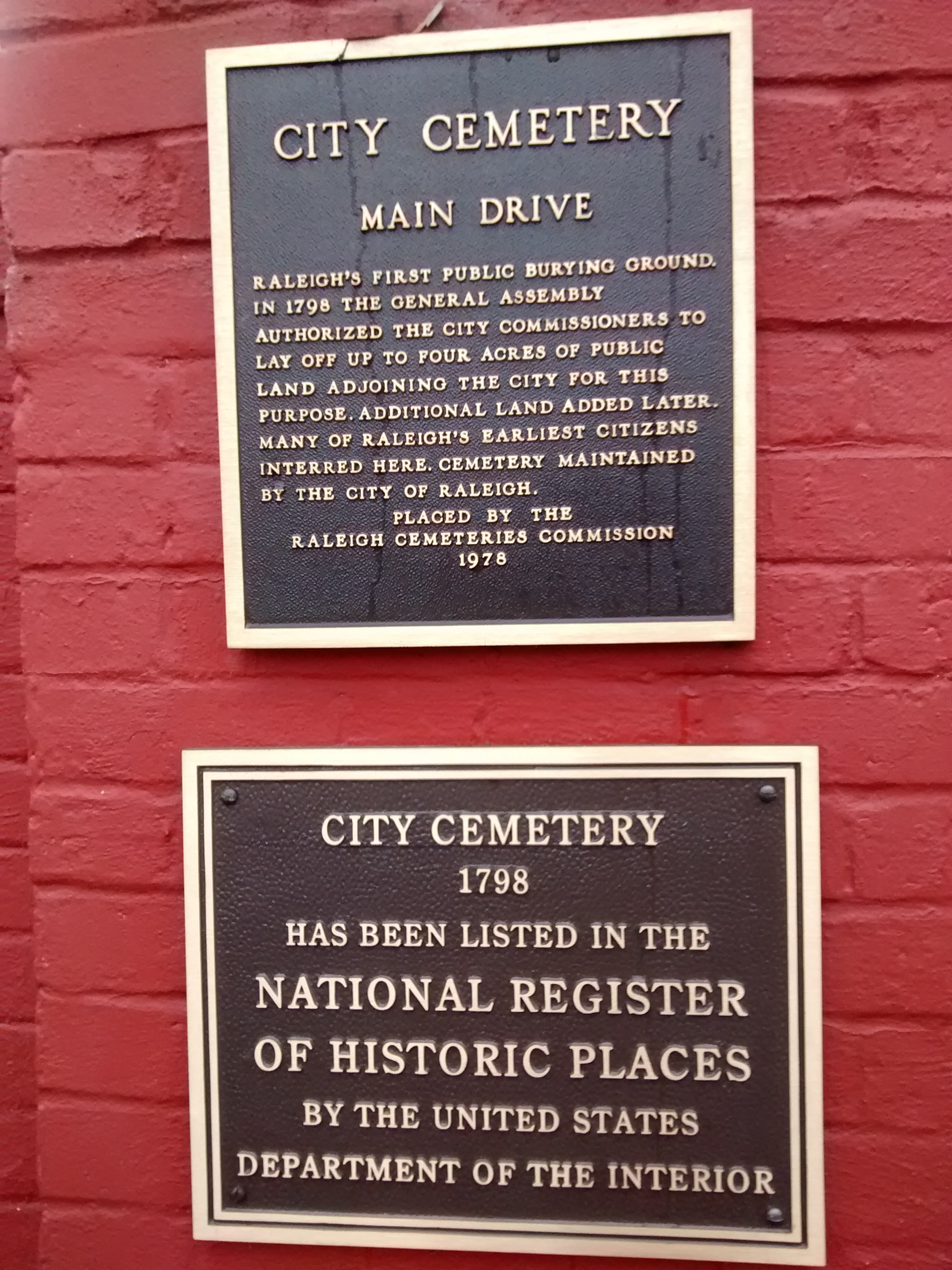
Plaques in front of the cemetery
