= Graveside DIY (Skatepark) =

- Interactive map of Graveside DIY
- Type: Skatepark (Unsanctioned)
- Location: Raleigh, North Carolina, U.S.
- Coordinates: 35.743088°N 78.697386°W
- Area: 18,000 sq ft
- Opened: 2016
- Closed: December 31, 2024
- Operated by: Community volunteers
- Status: Demolished (February 2025)
- Designation: DIY Memorial & Recreational Site

Graveside DIY was a community-built, unsanctioned skatepark located in Raleigh, North Carolina. Established in 2016 on private land off Mid Pines Road, it became one of the largest and most prominent examples of tactical urbanism in the Southeastern United States. The park was noted for its inclusive culture and community-funded architectural features, including a rare concrete "loop." It was demolished in early 2025 to make way for residential development, sparking a local advocacy movement for sanctioned DIY spaces in the city.

== History ==
The site began as a "closely guarded secret" in 2016, founded by a small group of local skateboarders on a 13-acre parcel owned by the Islamic Association of Raleigh. During the COVID-19 pandemic, the park's profile grew as a second generation of skaters expanded the site into an 18,000-square-foot facility.

Construction was funded entirely through community donations, GoFundMe campaigns, and the sale of merchandise, raising approximately $20,000 for materials such as concrete, cinder blocks, and rebar. Volunteers, including professional concrete finishers and carpenters, provided the labor.

On December 31, 2024, the property was sold to Blue Heel Development for $1.25 million for the construction of a 57-unit subdivision. A farewell event was held in mid-December 2024, and the ramps were officially demolished by developers in February 2025.

== Features ==
Graveside was characterized by its evolving, hand-built obstacles. Key features included:

- The Loop: Built in 2023, it was one of the only full concrete loops at a DIY park in the Southeast.
- The Punk Wall: A six-foot-tall vertical ramp built in 2022 that served as a centerpiece for photography and local skate videos.
- Rainbow Coping Quarter Pipe: A technical transition feature added in 2023.

The park's proximity to a historic family cemetery—the resting place of descendants of John Winters, Raleigh's first Black city council member—gave the site its name and a unique cultural atmosphere.

== Culture and advocacy ==
The park was home to Skate Forward, an organization founded by Nikki Knapp dedicated to promoting inclusion for women, femme, and non-binary skaters. Following the park's closure, the Graveside community transitioned into political advocacy. In March 2025, skaters petitioned the Raleigh City Council to provide underutilized public land for a sanctioned DIY space, citing successful models in Charlotte and Asheville.

The legacy of Graveside DIY directly influenced the creation of Project 303, a smaller memorial-focused skatepark in the Boylan Heights neighborhood.

== See also ==
- Skateboarding
- Do it yourself
- Burnside Skatepark
