= 2015 Chapel Hill shooting =

2015 triple-murder in North Carolina

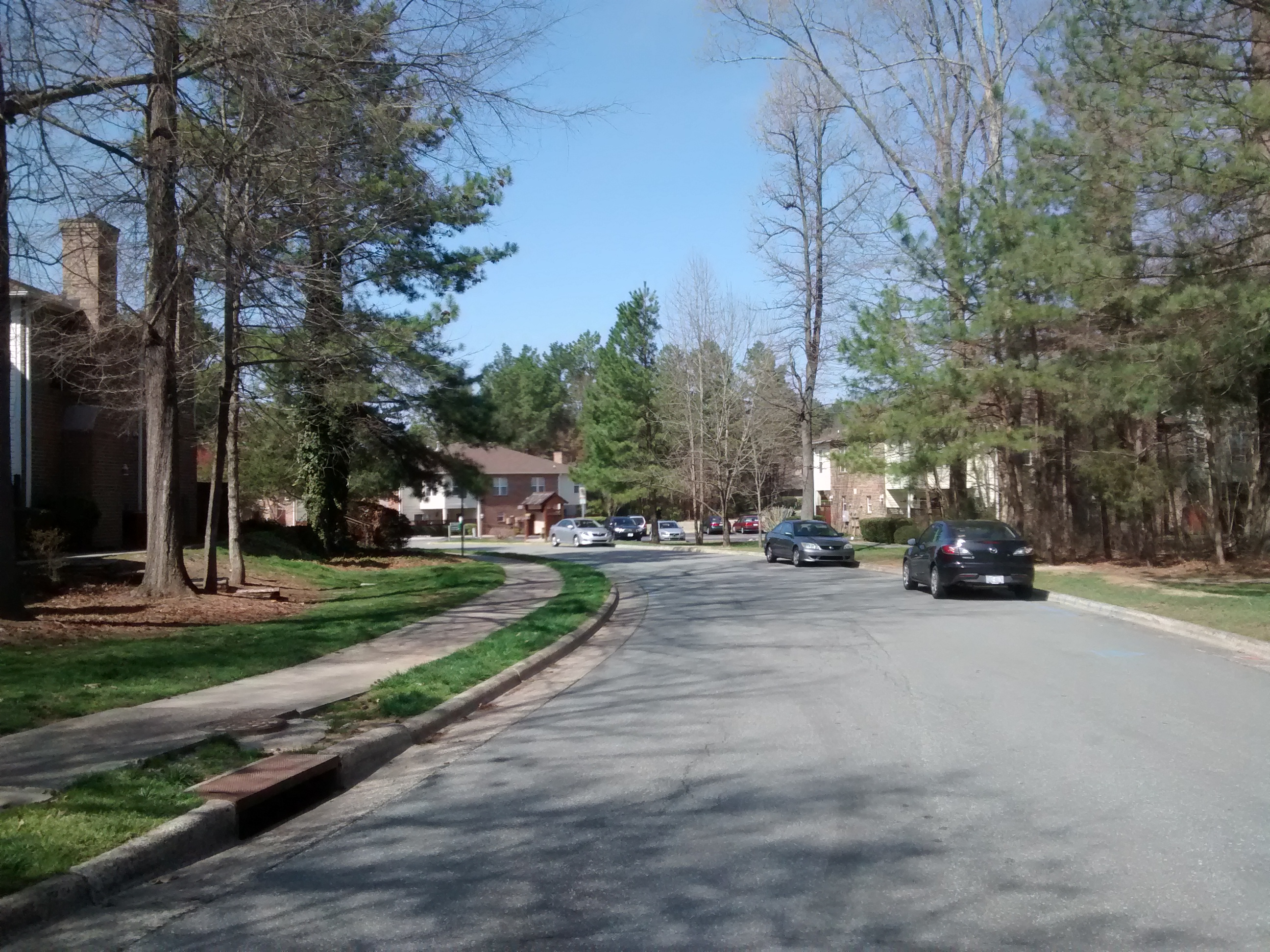
- Summerwalk Circle, the street where the shooting took place

- 2015 Chapel Hill shooting (North Carolina) 2015 Chapel Hill shooting (the United States)
- Location: 35°53′48.8″N 79°0′32.1″W; Chapel Hill, North Carolina, U.S.
- Date: February 10, 2015 c. 5:15 p.m. (EST)
- Attack type: Triple-murder by shooting, execution-style murders, home invasion
- Weapon: SIG Sauer P229 .357-caliber semi-automatic handgun
- Deaths: 3
- Perpetrator: Craig Stephen Hicks
- Verdict: Pleaded guilty
- Convictions: First-degree murder (3 counts)
- Sentence: Three consecutive life sentences without the possibility of parole

On February 10, 2015, Deah Shaddy Barakat, Yusor Mohammad Abu-Salha, and Razan Mohammad Abu-Salha were killed in their home in Finley Forest Condominiums on Summerwalk Circle in Chapel Hill, North Carolina, United States. Barakat was a second-year student in the University of North Carolina at Chapel Hill School of Dentistry, his wife Yusor was a North Carolina State University (NCSU) graduate planning to enter UNC Dentistry School in the fall, and her sister Razan was a student at NCSU majoring in architecture and environmental design.

Their neighbor, Craig Stephen Hicks, who killed the three people in a single attack, turned himself in to Chapel Hill police later that day and was arrested. On February 10, the Chapel Hill Police Department stated that their "preliminary investigation indicates that the crime was motivated by an ongoing neighbor dispute over parking. Hicks is cooperating with investigators." Hicks was charged with three counts of first-degree murder.

On February 16, Hicks was indicted by a Durham County grand jury on three counts of first-degree murder and one count of discharging a firearm into an occupied dwelling. The Federal Bureau of Investigation and the United States Department of Justice also launched their own investigations into the shooting. There have been concerns of a hate crime motive as all of the student were Muslim. Federal authorities could not find sufficient evidence to charge Hicks with a hate crime. The trial was scheduled to take place in the summer of 2019. On June 12, 2019, Hicks pleaded guilty to the murders and was sentenced to three consecutive terms of life imprisonment.

== Shooting ==
On February 10, 2015, local police in Chapel Hill, North Carolina, responded to a report of gunshots heard at 5:15 p.m. Upon arriving at the Finley Forest Condominiums, located on Summerwalk Circle at Chapel Hill, a woman told them a friend was bleeding, and directed them to a condominium. There, they found Barakat lying dead in the front doorway bleeding from the head. One of the Abu-Salha sisters was found dead in the kitchen, with the other lying in the doorway of that room. All three victims had been killed with gunshot wounds to the head, and were pronounced dead at the scene.

According to prosecutors, the perpetrator shot Barakat multiple times at the doorway after the latter opened the door in response to his knocking. He then entered the living room and shot the Abu-Salha sisters in the head, then shot Barakat again before leaving. According to autopsies, the Abu-Salha sisters were shot execution-style.

In June 2019 it was reported that Deah Barakat had recorded the encounter with Hicks on his cellphone camera. The recording shows Hicks complaining that Barakat and the Abu-Salha sisters were taking more parking spaces than the condo rules allow, before Hicks opens fire with his gun.

A witness outside told police he had heard shots and saw a man leaving the condominium and driving off in a gold car. Police found eight shell casings in the living room and a bullet somewhere else inside in the home, according to a warrant. They seized three cellphones, a watch, two sets of keys, and Barakat's wallet and keychain.

The victims' neighbor, Craig Stephen Hicks, a 46-year-old former car parts salesman, turned himself in to sheriff's deputies in nearby Pittsboro on the night of the shooting. He was in possession of a .357-caliber handgun at the time. Investigators later positively matched the handgun's ballistics to the shell casings found in the apartment.

=== Victims ===
The three victims of the Chapel Hill Shooting. From left: Deah Barakat, Yusor Abu-Salha, Razan Abu-Salha

Three people (two of whom were students) were killed:

- Deah Shaddy Barakat, age 23, a Syrian American. A 2013 graduate of North Carolina State University who had majored in business administration, he was a second-year student in the UNC School of Dentistry. He and 10 other dental students were planning to travel to Turkey to treat Syrian refugees as part of a project organized by UNC-Chapel Hill School of Dentistry and the Syrian-American Medical Society. He also worked to provide free dental supplies to the homeless in his spare time. An avid fan of basketball, he married Yusor Mohammad Abu-Salha on December 27, 2014. The couple had been married just six weeks when they were killed. An autopsy clarified that Barakat was shot multiple times in the head, chest, and upper extremities.
- Yusor Mohammad Abu-Salha, age 21, a Jordanian American of Palestinian descent and the wife of Deah Shaddy Barakat. Born in Jordan, she emigrated to the United States at the age of six months. A 2014 graduate of North Carolina State University, she had graduated with a bachelor's degree in biological sciences, and was planning to enter UNC in the fall to study dentistry. Friends described her as "down to earth" and "understanding", a happy newlywed. According to an autopsy, she was shot in the head and hip.
- Razan Mohammad Abu-Salha, age 19, a Jordanian American of Palestinian descent and a sister of Yusor Mohammad Abu-Salha. Born in the United States, she was a sophomore in the North Carolina State University College of Design, majoring in architecture and environmental design. She was also dedicated to charity work, supporting charities like Global Deaf Muslim. An autopsy described her cause of death as a gunshot wound to the left side of the head.

== Perpetrator ==
Craig Stephen Hicks was studying to become a paralegal at Durham Technical Community College at the time of the shooting. He had moved to Chapel Hill in 2005 from Bethalto, Illinois. He has been divorced twice, with one marriage lasting only five months.

Though he was described by the school as an "exemplary student", Hicks was described by neighbors as threatening. In 2013, he reported a dispute between a tow truck driver and a car's owner to police, and walked to the parking lot with a gun. A friend of Yusor stated that Hicks was "holding a rifle" while complaining about extra cars in the neighborhood and noise from their game of Risk. Another resident and a friend of Barakat and Yusor Abu-Salha told the Associated Press that

Hicks complained about once a month that the two men were parking in a visitor's space as well as their assigned spot. 'He would come over to the door. Knock on the door and then have a gun on his hip saying 'you guys need to not park here.' ... Both Hicks and his neighbors complained to the property managers who warned them to call the police if they were harassed again.

Hicks had a fixation on the 1993 movie Falling Down strong enough for his ex-wife to make specific mention of it after the shootings. The movie centered on a divorced and unemployed man who has a mental breakdown and goes on a violent rampage. She described Hicks as "watching it incessantly" and finding the movie "hilarious", showing "no compassion at all".

Hicks posted on Facebook comments and images that were critical of all religions and religious violence, and his profile read "Atheists for Equality". He was critical of Christian opponents of the Park51 project, stating: "Seems an overwhelming majority of Christians in this country feel that the Muslims are using the Ground Zero mosque plans to 'mark their conquest' ... bunch of hypocrites, everywhere I've been in this country there are churches marking the Christian conquest of this country from the Native Americans." He also posted, "I hate Islam just as much as Christianity, but they have the right to worship in this country just as much as any others do," and also opined on the same page that it would be OK if the United States had a Muslim president. Hicks had set a banner image on his page to one stating: "I don't deny you your right to believe whatever you'd like; but I have the right to point out it's ignorant and dangerous for as long as your baseless superstitions keep killing people." In another Facebook post, Hicks stated: "I give your religion as much respect as your religion gives me ... there's nothing complicated about it, and I have every right to insult a religion that goes out of its way to insult, to judge, and to condemn me as an inadequate human being—which your religion does with self-righteous gusto." His wife described Hicks as a champion of individual's rights, and said "This incident had nothing to do with religion or the victims' faith but was related to a longstanding parking dispute that my husband had with the neighbors." Neighbors confirmed that Hicks had frequently complained about parking and noise issues for years, and would confront residents while armed.

Hicks had thirteen firearms in his house.

== Aftermath ==
On February 11, a few thousand people attended a vigil in "The Pit" at the center of the UNC Chapel Hill campus. Deah's mother Layla Barakat told the students: "He died of hate crime and his legacy is never hate. You don't respond back by hating the other. You respond back by love. By peace, by mercy. That's Deah's way." Deah's brother, Farris added: "If, and it was quite possible, that this was an act based off of [sic] evil and a scared ignorant man, do not let ignorance propagate in your life ... do not reply to ignorance with ignorance. Become an amazing, bright intellectual leader that I know this university can create." Chancellors from UNC Chapel Hill, North Carolina State University, and North Carolina Central University attended the vigil.

A public funeral was held on February 12 at North Carolina State University. It was hosted by the Islamic Association of Raleigh; an estimated 5,500 people attended. NCSU's Muslim Student Association also held a prayer service and candlelight vigil the same evening on the Brickyard, the central plaza on the main university campus. An estimated 3,000 students, faculty, staff and members of the local community attended the vigil despite the cold and strong winds which kept the candles from being lit; instead, cellphone lights were used. Governor McCrory and the chancellors of N.C. State and UNC Chapel Hill attended the vigil and delivered remarks. Speaking at the vigil, Farris Barakat, also an alumnus of N.C. State University, discussed his deep family ties to the university and his hopes that it "means something to each and every student at NC State. I hope that means we somehow touched your heart in a way that you can live in their legacy and you can take what they did that was good and you can live it in your life. It is the best thing you can do for my family now." His sister Suzanne Barakat, flashing the wolf-hand sign popular among N.C. State students and alumni, spoke of her younger brother's commitment to serving others, and his wife's and sister-in-law's volunteer and charitable contributions to the greater community. "The message that we want to share is spread love, spread awareness because these three people were nothing but love and kindness. I'm sure they would want you to continue that for them."

=== Investigations and prosecution ===
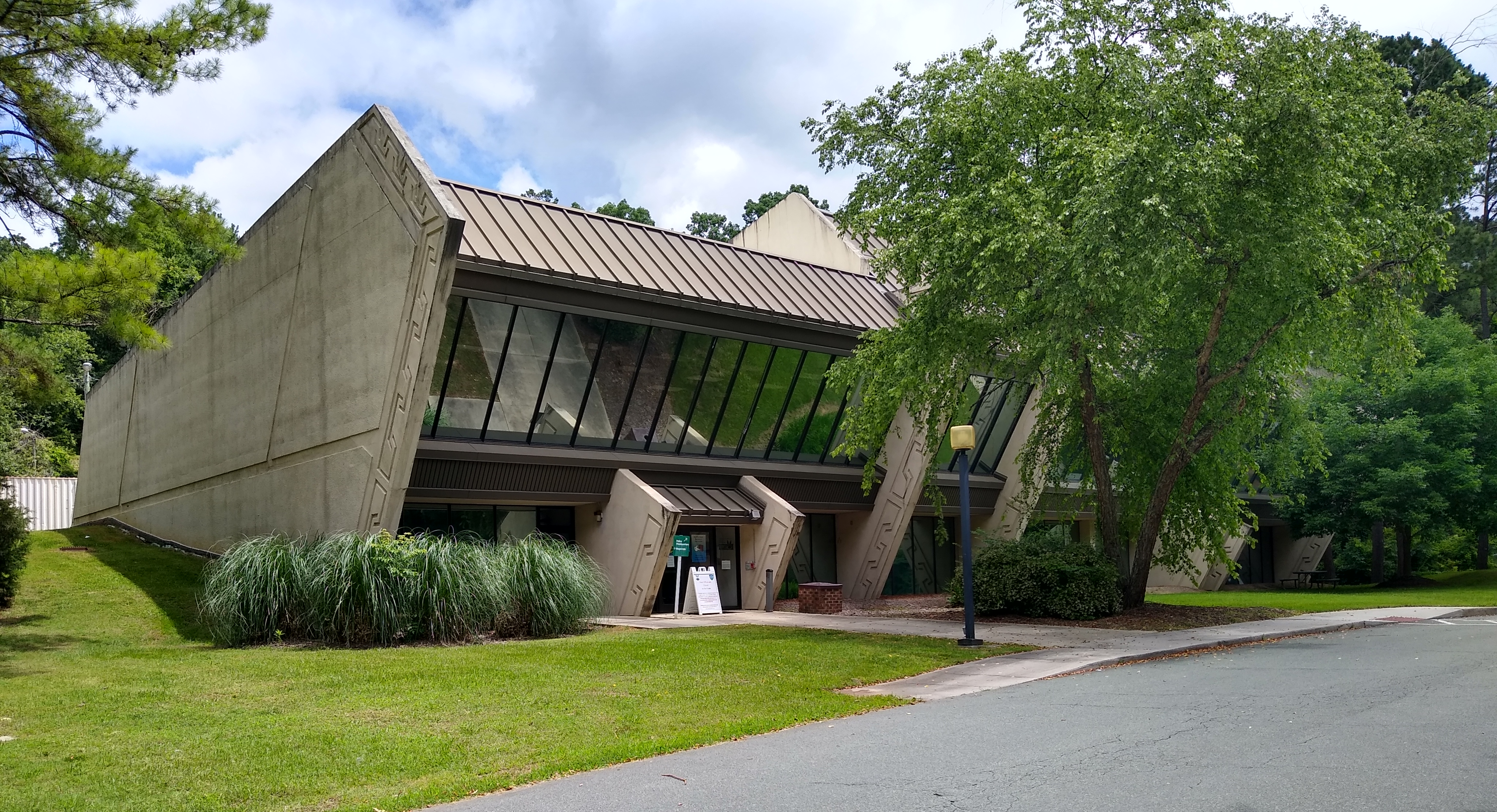
The Chapel Hill Police Department investigated the shooting.

On February 10, the Chapel Hill Police Department said their investigation indicates that the crime was motivated by an ongoing neighbor dispute over parking. After Hicks surrendered to police, investigators swabbed the driver's door handle and steering wheel of his Nissan for evidence, and seized his vehicle registration and insurance card. On February 11, Chapel Hill Mayor Mark Kleinschmidt stated:

the Chapel Hill Police Department is using all available resources to determine whether hate was a motivating factor. All we know for certain at this time is that it was a senseless and tragic act surrounding a longstanding dispute ... We do not know whether anti-Muslim bias played a role in this crime, but I do recognize the fear that members of our community may feel. Chapel Hill is a place for everyone, a place where Muslim lives matter.

Investigators searched Hicks' home and seized two fully loaded handguns, a fully loaded AR-15 Bushmaster rifle, two shotguns, five other rifles, two other handguns and two pellet guns. They also seized numerous magazines with varying amounts of ammunition, boxes of ammunition, shotgun shells, BBs, gun scopes and other gun-related items, according to a warrant. Investigators also seized two desktop computers, three cellphones and a digital camera.

On February 12, agents with the Bureau of Alcohol, Tobacco, Firearms and Explosives arrived at the condominiums and the FBI announced it had launched "a parallel preliminary inquiry to determine whether or not any federal laws were violated related to the case".

On February 13, U.S. Attorney General Eric Holder said that civil-rights lawyers in the U.S. Department of Justice have opened an investigation to determine if this was a hate crime. Holder stated that: "Like all Americans, I was shocked and saddened by this week's heinous murders of three young people in Chapel Hill, North Carolina ... I have made available the full resources of the Justice Department to help ensure that justice will be served in this case." By February 13, over a hundred Muslim advocacy groups had called for such a federal investigation, saying that the shootings "come in the wake of a disturbing rise in especially threatening and vitriolic anti-Muslim rhetoric and activities". Investigators initially had not ruled out any motives, including religious bias.

Local investigators met on the morning of February 13 with FBI agents and federal and Durham County prosecutors to discuss the case. It was thought Hicks' charges could go before a Durham County grand jury as early as February 16, but prosecutors had not then decided whether to pursue the death penalty. On February 16, Hicks was indicted by a grand jury in Durham on three counts of first-degree murder and one count of discharging a firearm into an occupied dwelling. On March 2, 2015, Durham County District Attorney Roger Echols said he intended to seek the death penalty against Hicks. On April 6, 2015, prosecutors confirmed Hicks was eligible to face a death penalty trial after finding incriminating evidence against him; however, on April 11, 2019, new Durham County District Attorney Satana Deberry announced that prosecutors would not seek the death penalty against Hicks, in an effort to speed up the legal process and avoid further delays.

On June 12, 2019, Hicks pleaded guilty to the shooting and was sentenced to three consecutive terms of life imprisonment. As North Carolina hate crime laws only cover misdemeanors, he was not charged with hate crime by the state, and federal prosecutors did not find evidence to charge him with such. He is currently serving his sentence in the Bertie Correctional Institution, Windsor, North Carolina.

=== Memorials ===
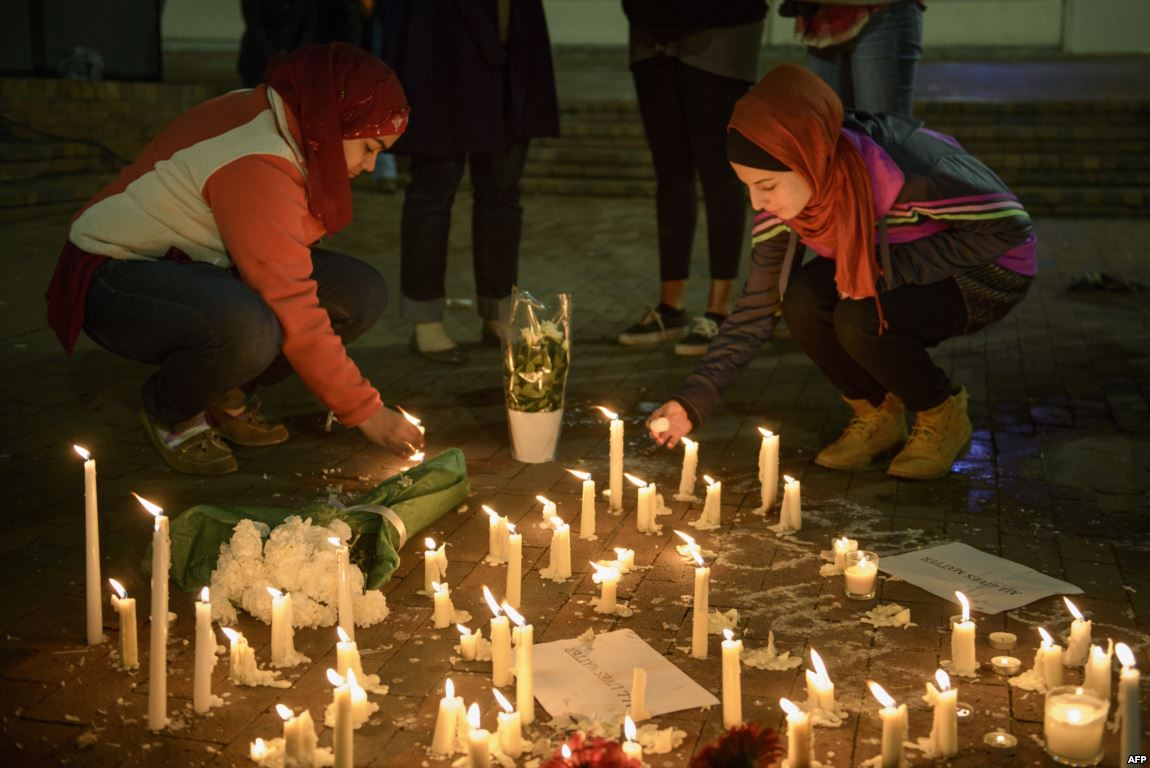
A vigil in Chapel Hill on February 11, 2015

Family members created a Facebook page dedicated to the three victims entitled "Our Three Winners". In addition, Deah Barakat had been a co-organizer of a fundraising drive established through the UNC School of Dentistry and the Syrian-American Medical Society. Named "Syrian Dental Relief", the fund was intended to provide dental care to Syrian refugees in Turkey. Prior to his death, approximately $3,000 of a $20,000 goal had been raised. In the days following his murder, donations swelled the fund to close to $300,000, with many donors leaving messages of condolence and support. The donations page was shared over 47,000 times.

Vigils were held in Washington, Ottawa, Gaza, and other cities. Students also organized vigils at universities across the United States, including at the University of Chicago, UCLA, Temple University and the University of Wisconsin-Milwaukee.

Golden State Warriors basketball player Stephen Curry, of whom Barakat was a fan, paid tribute to Barakat during NBA All-Star Weekend. On February 14, he competed in the Shooting Stars Competition and Three-Point Contest while wearing shoes with writing in honor of the victim. "I just did my little part to shed that light towards him ... Obviously it's a great platform to be on, but it only seemed right", Curry said after winning the Three-Point Contest. He subsequently sent the shoes to Barakat's family.

On February 20, Randy Woodson, the chancellor of N.C. State University, announced the creation of a university-endowed scholarship fund in memory of the three students. To be named the "Our Three Winners Fund", the endowment will award scholarships in perpetuity in the names of the three students through the Poole College of Management (in memory of Deah Barakat), the College of Sciences (in memory of Yusor Mohammad) and the College of Design (in memory of Razan Abu-Salha). The scholarships will be awarded to students for demonstrating leadership, service and creativity. "Deah, Yusor and Razan exemplified the best of NC State and will forever serve as role models for our student body", Woodson said.

Each was not only an outstanding student, but individually and as a family they lived their lives bringing joy to others, helping those in need and making the world a better place.

...

Deah, Yusor and Razan made a tremendous difference in our community and across the globe in their short time on this earth. We hope to always remember and honor their lives through the Our Three Winners Fund.

We also intend this scholarship to be a forever reminder that NC State must always hold as a core value a respect for diversity in all its forms and strive to maintain an environment where everyone feels safe, respected and valued.

== Response ==
The shooting was covered by media outlets including The New York Times, BBC, and The Guardian as well as newspapers in France, Germany, India, and Israel. At the same time, social media contributors asked whether the incident would have received faster and more extensive media coverage if the victims had been non-Muslims and the perpetrator had been Muslim. The Twitter hashtag #ChapelHillShooting appeared over 900,000 times and trended in the United States, the United Kingdom, Egypt, Saudi Arabia and several other countries. The hashtag #MuslimLivesMatter was used over 100,000 times.

=== Victims' family ===
Deah's sister, Dr. Suzanne Barakat, questioned the issue of parking as a cause in an interview with MSNBC's Morning Joe. She said that Deah's unit had an assigned parking space, Hicks had an assigned parking space, and there was a third space designated for guest parking. However, Hicks had told Deah not to use the designated guest parking space as Hicks said it was for his wife. While the complex manager confirmed that the additional space was designated for visitors' parking, Barakat said that her brother went to great lengths to have his guests use other guest parking spots which he mapped out for them. Finally, she stated, the day before this interview, the parking area was observed and no car related to her family or friends was in that designated guest parking spot. In a later interview with CNN's The Lead with Jake Tapper, Barakat reinforced her belief that this was not a parking dispute as at the time of the murders because a car belonging to a member of her family was not parked in the space designated as guest parking by the complex agency. Barakat then said that

had roles been reversed and the man was Muslim, of Arab descent, of South Asian descent, this would have immediately been labeled an act of terror. I haven't heard anyone use the term terrorist here ... why the double standard? He has terrorized our families, he has terrorized our lives, he has terrorized our community locally, nationally, and internationally and it's time that people call it for what it is.

Dr. Mohammad Abu-Salha said that this "was a hate crime" due to their religion and culture. He said that his daughter "told her family a week ago that she had 'a hateful neighbor.'" Abu-Salha also said "this man had picked on my daughter and her husband a couple of times before, and he talked with them with his gun in his belt. And they were uncomfortable with him, but they did not know he would go this far."

Deah's sister, Suzanne Barakat, gave a Ted talk on Islamophobia in response to the shooting, entitled "Islamophobia killed my brother. Let's end the hate".

=== Perpetrator's family ===
According to Hicks' wife Karen (who announced that she would be divorcing him), he did not commit the shooting due to religious bias, but because of a longstanding parking dispute, and that he had problems with several other neighbors. She also said that Hicks supported same-sex marriage, abortion rights, and racial equality. The New York Daily News states that Hicks' mother-in-law from a former marriage, Martha Landson, "has trouble believing Hicks' history of anger could have led to his alleged deadly outburst." Landson stated that Hicks "just didn't like people." Sarah Hurley, Hicks' estranged 20-year-old daughter from his first marriage, called her father "a monster," adding "He was never a father to me, except by blood." Hurley, who self-identifies as Christian, said she told Hicks her religious beliefs, which she said he agreed to respect. But she said his social media posts became increasingly antagonistic toward others' beliefs. "I shut him out of my life permanently for not only disrespecting the religious beliefs of others, but bashing them on social media. It was obvious he had a lot of hate in his heart, but I did not know he had developed into a monster and would take another's life," she said. "I am extremely disgusted to say that I am biologically related to him. His actions were not right by any means and the prosecution has my full support if needed."

=== Muslim community ===
Council on American–Islamic Relations National Executive Director Nihad Awad responded by stating: "Based on the brutal nature of this crime, the past anti-religion statements of the alleged perpetrator, the religious attire of two of the victims, and the rising anti-Muslim rhetoric in American society, we urge state and federal law enforcement authorities to quickly address speculation of a possible bias motive in this case." Abdullah Antepli, director of Muslim affairs at nearby Duke University, urged people not to jump to conclusions on the motive.

Mirna Barq, president of the Syrian American Council (SAC), said, "Today, the world lost three beautiful souls just as they were entering the prime of their lives. This is a great tragedy for the Syrian-American community, for Arab Americans and for all Americans, and we mourn all three of them as one of our own. We also wish to honor the victims' devotion to helping the neediest Syrians and to uplifting the Syrian people."

The national vice president of the U.S. Ahmadiyya Muslim Community issued a statement warning against "rising Islamophobia and anti-Muslim sentiment". Another spokesperson for the community said that "in the current climate of anti-Muslim sentiment, we need to talk about what is causing such hatred and figure out how to dispel it".

Iyad bin Amin Madani, the secretary-general of the Organisation of Islamic Cooperation, condemned the killings, saying: "This gruesome crime has left Muslims worldwide in a state of shock and has raised concerns of the growing feelings of hatred towards Muslims and the increase of acts linked to Islamophobia in the United States." He urged the US government to take measures to protect society there from "negative images, discrimination, and stereotyping that contradict the core values of the American society", and called for international cooperation to fight "extremism, violence, and religious intolerance, as well as hate crimes and (acts) that incite them."

Shuja Shafi, the secretary-general of the Muslim Council of Britain, deplored a perceived lack of objective media coverage and an inconsistent response towards attacks on Muslims.

Allameh Sayyed Ali Fadlallah, the head of the Board of Ulema of Lebanon, criticized U.S. media coverage of the shooting and said the incident raised worries of further anti-Muslim attacks in Western nations.

=== Civil rights and faith groups ===
According to CNN, 150 civil rights and faith groups have signed a letter sent to U.S. Attorney General Eric Holder asking for a federal hate crime investigation. The letter, which was signed by "a number of Islamic and Arab organizations plus Jewish, Sikh, Asian American and other groups", stated: "Federal leadership is necessary in this case in order to send the strongest message to the public that acts of violence like these have no place in civil society and will be prosecuted to the fullest extent of the law ... as American Muslims and those perceived to be Muslim now, more than ever, fear for their safety, the American people need to hear a strong message our nation's chief law enforcement officer."

=== Universities ===
Randy Woodson, the chancellor of N.C. State University, where all three victims had been students, said: "Senseless acts like this go against all of our beliefs. A core value of N.C. State is respect for diversity in all its forms. We strive to maintain an environment where everyone feels safe, respected, and valued." Carol Folt, the chancellor of UNC Chapel Hill, said "Such an act of violence goes against the very fiber of our community and society. It also creates a sense of vulnerability for all of us, especially members of the Muslim community. Dr. Jane Weintraub, the dean of the University of North Carolina Dental School, said the community was "heartbroken and grief-stricken by ... the incredible loss to our school and to the entire Carolina Community". She paid special tribute to Deah Barakat and his wife Yusor, and called the shooting "an incredible tragedy for our school, the dental community and the University. Today, everyone here is grieving.

At a prayer service and vigil held at N.C. State University on the evening of February 12, the dean of the university College of Design, Marvin Malecha, eulogized Razan Abu-Salha, who had been one of his students. "In the spirit of celebrating a life and a legacy, she will leave with us that gentle spirit and the determination to make this a better place for everyone", Malecha said. "There is no better legacy than that. It's that legacy that will help us be more creative and more determined. We can only hope that a lesson will be learned from this and that lesson is that we must value every point of view, every way of looking at the world, because without that point of view, we will not be innovative, we will not be creative and we will not make the kind of contribution that is expected of us in a country where we have so much to offer."

=== U.S. government reactions ===
On February 13, 2015, President Barack Obama issued a statement:

Yesterday, the FBI opened an inquiry into the brutal and outrageous murders of Yusor Mohammad Abu-Salha, Deah Shaddy Barakat, and Razan Mohammad Abu-Salha in Chapel Hill, North Carolina. In addition to the ongoing investigation by local authorities, the FBI is taking steps to determine whether federal laws were violated. No one in the United States of America should ever be targeted because of who they are, what they look like, or how they worship. Michelle and I offer our condolences to the victims' loved ones. As we saw with the overwhelming presence at the funeral of these young Americans, we are all one American family. Whenever anyone is taken from us before their time, we remember how they lived their lives – and the words of one of the victims should inspire the way we live ours. 'Growing up in America has been such a blessing,' Yusor said recently. 'It doesn't matter where you come from. There's so many different people from so many different places, of different backgrounds and religions – but here, we're all one.'

During a summit on countering violent extremism, President Obama stated: "Americans of all faiths and backgrounds must continue to stand united with a community in mourning and insist that no one should ever be targeted because of who they are, what they look like, or how they worship."

State and local leaders responded to the shootings with messages of condolence. Governor Pat McCrory said he was "saddened by the senseless acts". Senator Richard Burr (R-NC) said the "tragic events have left three dead and our community in mourning. My prayers are with their families. I have faith that law enforcement will assemble the facts and ensure that justice is carried out on behalf of those murdered", while junior senator Thom Tillis (R-NC) said that he and his wife Susan "join other North Carolinians and people across the nation in praying for the families of Deah Shaddy Barakat, Yusor Mohammad Abu-Salha, and Razan Mohammad Abu-Salha as they bear the pain of this terrible tragedy and the loss of three young lives".

Representative David Price (D-NC) said the "appalling act of violence has shaken our community's sense of peace, and reminded us once again that we still face serious barriers to mutual acceptance. We must redouble our efforts to bridge the gaps of intolerance and hatred that divide our society." Chapel Hill mayor Mark Kleinschmidt said the deaths "represent an incomprehensible loss. I believe that we can find strength by acknowledging the fear and outrage that this act instills, coming together to ask difficult questions, and lifting up all people in our community who are hurting." Kleinschmidt also said that "I share strong feelings of outrage and shock with my fellow citizens and University students—as well as concerned people everywhere".

=== International reactions ===
United Nations Secretary-General Ban Ki-moon said he was deeply moved by scenes of thousands of people mourning their deaths. "At a time of troubling tensions stoked by those who seek to twist the teachings of faith and sow division, these three young people represented the best values of global citizenship and active community compassion to build a better world for all", he added. He urged United States authorities to investigate the shooting as a possible hate crime.

Governments and leaders of several Muslim-majority countries deemed the shooting to be terrorism, including Lebanon, Morocco, Palestine, and Saudi Arabia. The Supreme Leader of Iran, Ali Khamenei; the President of Turkey, Recep Tayyip Erdoğan; and the mother of the Emir of Qatar, Moza bint Nasser, accused the Western world of double standards on their reaction to the shooting.
