= Islamic Association of Raleigh =

Mosque in Raleigh, North Carolina, United States

Religion
- Affiliation: Islam

Location
- Location: 808 Atwater St, Raleigh, NC 27607
- State: North Carolina
- Country: United States
- Interactive map of Islamic Association of Raleigh
- Coordinates: 35.789860°N 78.691235°W

Architecture
- Type: Mosque
- Established: 1985
- Interior area: 40,000 sqft

Website
- raleighmasjid.org

The Islamic Association of Raleigh (IAR) is a mosque in Raleigh, North Carolina. Established in 1981, built in 1985, the mosque organizes community outreach, education, prayer services and sermons. It also frequently partners with other Islamic organizations in the area. The mosque has a 40,000 sqft center which houses 2 prayer halls, and an educational center for children. They also own and maintain an Islamic cemetery in Wendell, NC.

== History ==
After the 2015 Chapel Hill Shooting, on February 12, a public funeral was held with an estimated 5,500 attendees. It began on the athletic fields on North Carolina State University's campus. At the end of the service the coffins were taken to the cemetery owned by the IAR.

In May 2020, the IAR hosted drive-thru prayer services for Ramadan at the NC State Fairgrounds, due to COVID-19. The mosque remained closed and members were encouraged to pray at home, and attend nightly sermons remotely. In February 2021 hosted a vaccine clinic, distributing COVID-19 vaccines to the public.

== Eid Fest ==
The Islamic Association of Raleigh, along with 10 other mosques and Islamic organizations in the triangle, organizes Eid Fest, a public festival celebrating Eid al-Adha. It is typically held in the Jim Graham Building, hosting several thousand attendees, and features community engagement, traditions and Islamic cuisine. Additionally, in 2024 the NC State Muslim Student's Association held donations to support humanitarian aid for victims of the Gaza War. Prior to Eid Fest, the IAR held their own festivals for Eid al-Adha reportedly with 8,000 people in attendance.

== See also ==
- List of mosques in the United States
