= Glenwood–Brooklyn Historic District =

Historic neighborhood in Raleigh, North Carolina, United States

- U.S. National Register of Historic Places
- U.S. Historic district
- Location within North Carolina Location within the United States
- Location: Roughly bounded by W. Peace St., St. Mary's St., Wills Forest St., and Glenwood Ave., Raleigh, North Carolina
- Coordinates: 35°47′36″N 78°38′45″W
- Area: 63 acres (25 ha)
- Built: 1905
- Architect: Multiple
- Architectural style: Bungalow/craftsman, Colonial, Queen Anne
- MPS: Early Twentieth Century Raleigh Neighborhoods TR
- NRHP reference No.: 85001672, 02000058 (Boundary Increase and Decrease)
- Added to NRHP: July 29, 1985, February 20, 2002 (Boundary Increase and Decrease)

Glenwood or the Glenwood–Brooklyn Historic District is a historic neighborhood and national historic district located at Raleigh, North Carolina. The district encompasses 286 contributing buildings in an early-20th century streetcar suburb for working- and middle-class whites. Glenwood and Brooklyn were developed between about 1905 to 1951 and includes notable examples of Colonial Revival, Queen Anne, and Bungalow / American Craftsman style architecture. The houses are predominantly 1 1/2- and 2-story frame dwellings.

It was listed on the National Register of Historic Places in 1985 as Glenwood, with a boundary increase / decrease in 2002 to include the Brooklyn neighborhood.

Since the 1980s, some large homes have become apartments, and other homes have been torn down, with new ones going up.

On April 5, 2016, Raleigh City Council voted for the city's first streetside historic overlay district. Area residents had asked for the rezoning since 2014, hoping to prevent too much new development. In many cases, improvements, demolition, and new buildings will now require a detailed review.

== See also ==
- List of Registered Historic Places in North Carolina
