= Montfort Hall =

Mansion in Raleigh, North Carolina

- U.S. National Register of Historic Places
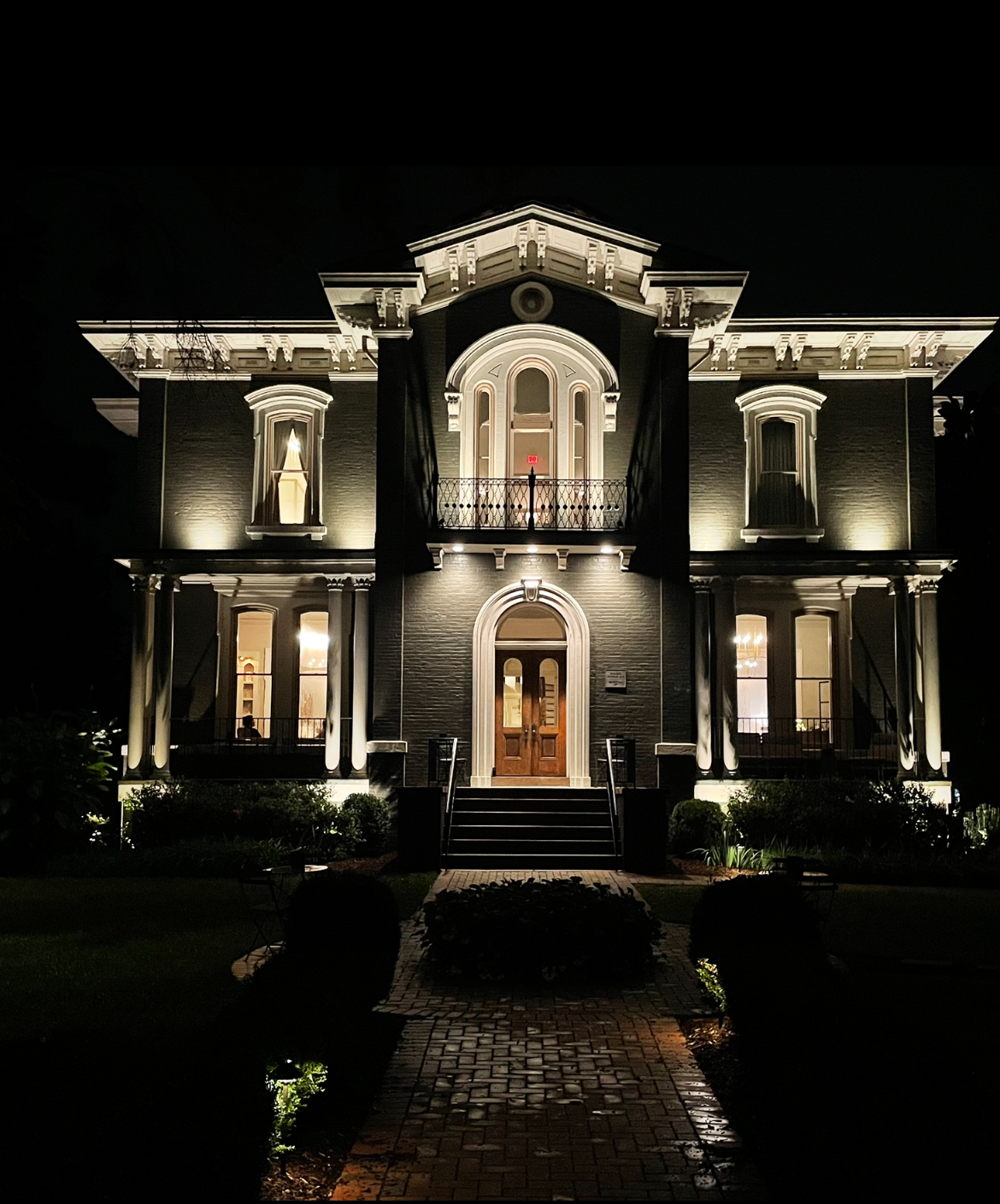
- Montfort Hall, operating as Heights House Hotel & Venue in 2024.

- Location within North Carolina Location within the United States
- Location: 308 Boylan Ave., Raleigh, North Carolina
- Coordinates: 35°46′34.82″N 78°39′3.99″W
- Area: 1 acre (0.40 ha)
- Built: 1858-1860
- Built by: Briggs & Dobb
- Architect: William Percival
- Architectural style: Italianate
- NRHP reference No.: 78001979
- Added to NRHP: March 8, 1978

Montfort Hall is a registered historic landmark in the Boylan Heights neighborhood of Raleigh, North Carolina. It is one of the few mansions in the state's Capital that survived the American Civil War.

An example of Italianate architecture, it was listed on the National Register of Historic Places in 1978 as Montford Hall, and was designated as a Raleigh Historic Landmark in 1968 as Boylan Manson. It now operates as Heights House a 9-room boutique inn.

== Architectural Significance ==
English architect Williams Percival came to Raleigh in 1857 to work on the First Baptist Church, completed in 1859. Over three years he drew plans for 11 different sites around the state. Including North Carolina's State Capital, Caswell County Courthouse, and The Barracks in Tarboro, North Carolina.

Montfort Hall's interior centerpiece is a rotunda supported by four Corinthian columns and lit by a stained glass window located on the roof. Percival took inspiration from the State Capitol rotunda when designing the home.

== History ==
William Boylan purchased 197 acres of land for $3,000 in 1818, including the main house of Wakefield Plantation, originally built for Raleigh and Wake County founding father Joel Lane. Boylan was a prominent and influential businessman, active in early Raleigh newspapers and railroads, and operated plantations in Wake, Johnston, Chatham counties, and in Mississippi.

In 1855, Boylan deeded 100 acres of the Wakefield property to his son, William Montfort Boylan. Soon afterward, William Montfort Boylan commissioned English architect William Percival to design a residence. Construction of Montfort Hall was completed in 1858, and the house became one of Raleigh’s most prominent examples of Italianate architecture.

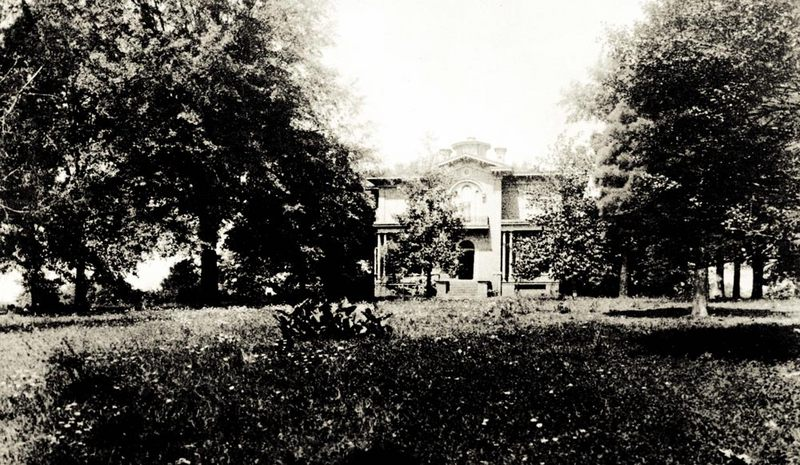
Montfort Hall circa 1900

After William Montfort Boylan's death in 1899, Montfort Hall passed to his wife, Mary Kinsey Boylan, and their son William. Mary hoped that her son would retain the mansion, but William sold the property to the Greater Raleigh Land Company in 1907. The estate was subdivided to create the Boylan Heights neighborhood, leaving the mansion and its immediate surroundings as the only remaining elements of the original plantation.

During the 1910s, Montfort Hall changed hands multiple times and was rented to traveling salesmen and merchants. In 1918, North Carolina Supreme Court Associate Justice George H. Brown sold the house to Rufus T. Coburn, whose family occupied the mansion until 1953. Geraldine Coburn Cox, Coburn's daughter, later described Montfort Hall in the 1920s as largely intact from the Boylan era, featuring a rotunda, stained glass dome, Corinthian columns, niches for statues, and early indoor plumbing.

After Coburn's death, the house was vacated and suffered vandalism. In 1954, the Boylan Heights Baptist Church purchased the mansion and conducted extensive renovations to adapt it for institutional and religious use. Spaces were modified for a church auditorium and other functional needs. Montfort Hall remains one of the few surviving antebellum mansions in Raleigh and the sole remaining example of architect William Percival's residential work in the city.

== Heights House ==
In June 2018, Montfort Hall was purchased by Jeff and Sarah Shepherd, with financial support from Keith Shepherd and Natalia Luckyanova, founders of Imangi Studios.

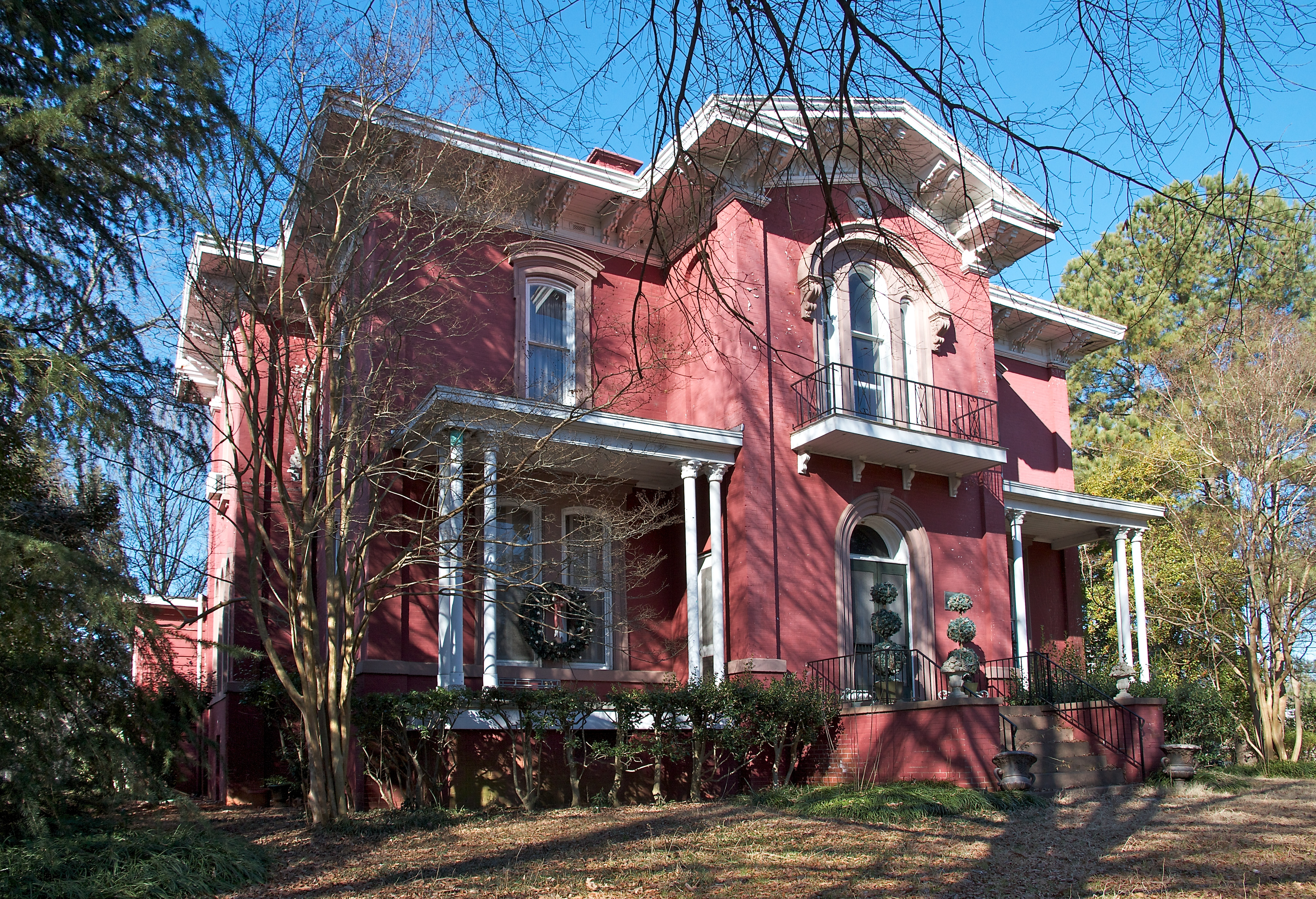
Front view of Montfort Hall

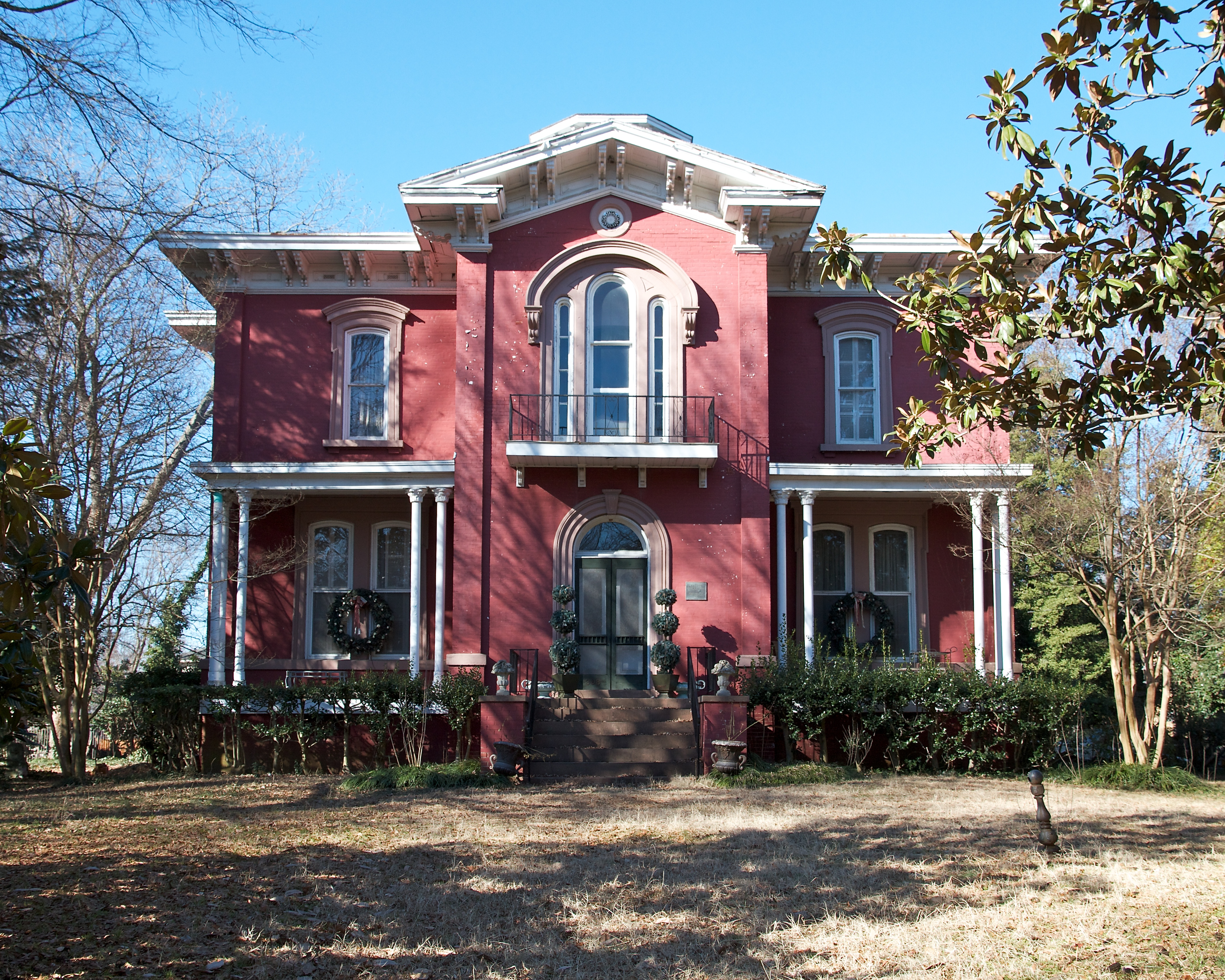
Another view of Montfort Hall

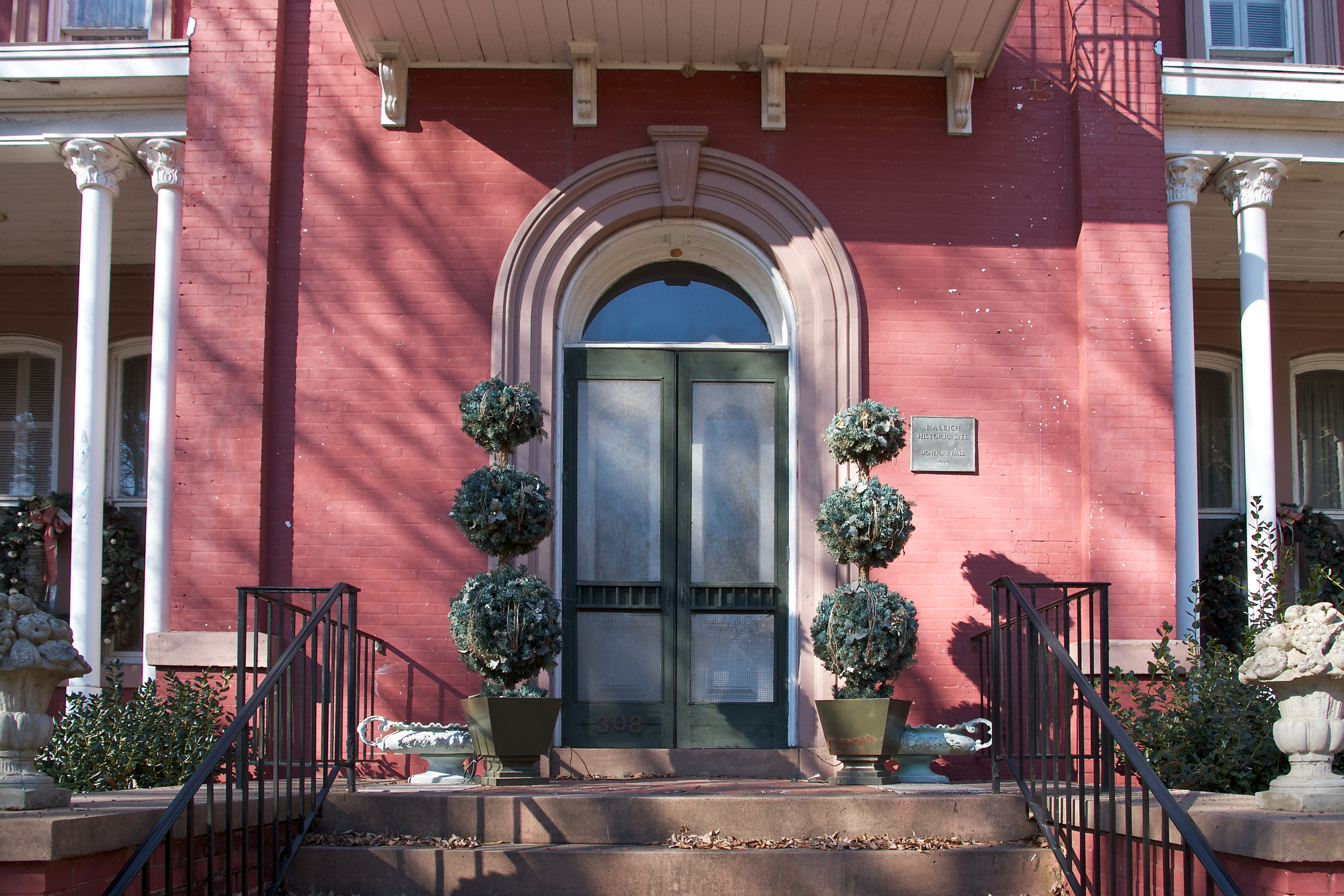
Detail of the front entrance of Montfort Hall

The new owners undertook a multi-year renovation to convert the mansion into a boutique inn while preserving and restoring its historic character. Restoration efforts included stabilizing structural elements, upgrading utilities, and carefully maintaining signature features such as the rotunda and stained-glass skylight. Interior spaces were adapted to accommodate modern hospitality needs without compromising the building’s historic integrity.

Rebranded as Heights House, the property now operates as a nine-room boutique inn and event venue, offering guests an immersive experience in Raleigh’s architectural heritage. Local coverage highlighted the project as a model for historic preservation combined with adaptive reuse in Raleigh’s urban core.

== See also ==
- National Register of Historic Places listings in Wake County, North Carolina
- Boylan Heights
- Joel Lane House
