= Harry Hosier =

African American Methodist preacher

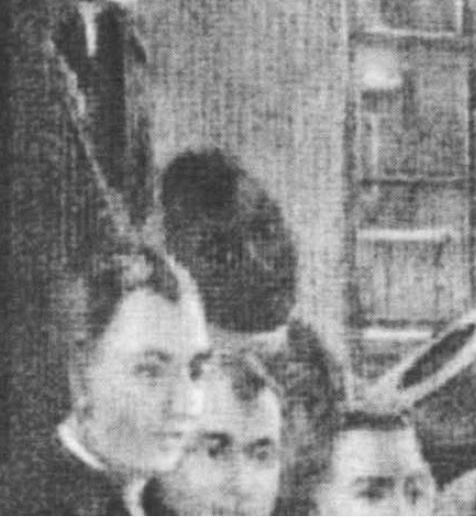
- Born: c. 1750 near Fayetteville, North Carolina
- Died: May 1806
- Occupations: Coach driver, servant, preacher

Ecclesiastical career
- Religion: Christian (Methodist)
- Ordained: n/a

Harry Hosier (c. 1750 – May 1806), better known during his life as "Black Harry", was an African American Methodist preacher during the Second Great Awakening in the early United States. Dr. Benjamin Rush said that, "...he was the greatest orator in America". His style was widely influential but he was never formally ordained by the Methodist Episcopal Church or the Rev. Richard Allen's separate African Methodist Episcopal Church in Philadelphia.

== Name ==
Better known as "Black Harry" during his lifetime, Harry Hosier was illiterate and his name is also recorded variously as Hoosier, Hoshur, and Hossier. Hosier is an occupational surname referring to a maker or seller of hosiery, still commonly worn by men as well as women in the 18th century. It may have been adopted as a slave name from one of Harry's masters or referred to his livelihood in Baltimore before meeting Bishop Asbury.

The spelling "Hoosier" caused William Piersen, a history professor at Fisk University, to argue for a connection to the Indiana demonym "Hoosier". Another history instructor, Tom Horton, suggests that if the uncommon surname Hoosier is correct, it would represent a parallel development: the application to Harry of the same epithet – referring to "low-born" and "fundamentalist" hillbillies of the kind Harry ministered to in his circuit riding – that was later applied to the early settlers on the Indiana shore of the Ohio River.

Harry Hosier should not be confused with Black Harry of St. Eustatius, a methodist preacher who also lived in the 18th century. He had been transferred by the Dutch from America to the Caribbean island of Sint Eustatius. Because of his preachings he was expelled to the continent again.

== Life ==
Hosier's early life is not well-documented but most sources agree he was a freedman. He was probably born to two African slaves near Fayetteville, North Carolina, but nothing else is known about his parents. He seems to have been sold north to Baltimore, Maryland, (possibly to the plantation of Harry Gough, a prominent Methodist there) and to have gained his freedom around the end of the American Revolution.

He met Bishop Francis Asbury, the "Father of the American Methodist Church", c. 1780, at a meeting Asbury considered "providentially arranged". This meeting may have occurred during Asbury's trip to Todd, North Carolina. Hosier worked as Asbury's carriage driver and servant. Finding that his illiterate guide could memorize long passages verbatim and warm up the crowds for his sermons, Asbury began to read the Bible aloud during their travel from county to county and to train Hosier as a preacher in his own right. The first reference to Hosier in Asbury's journals observes, "If I had Harry to go with me and meet the colored people, it would be attended with a blessing".

Speaking after Asbury, Hosier delivered his first sermon – "The Barren Fig Tree", concerning Luke 13:6–9 – to the black Methodist congregation at Adams's Chapel in Fairfax County, Virginia, in 1781. "The white people looked on with attention" even at the first performance; subsequently, they would often be moved to tears. Dr. Rush, one of the signers of the Declaration of Independence, declared it to be the greatest sermon he'd ever heard. Although Asbury had originally intended to use Hosier to minister among blacks and they "came a great distance to hear him", his delivery was so effective and affecting that his primary audience seems to have been white. His sermon at Thomas Chapel in Chapeltown, Delaware, in 1784 was the first to be delivered by a black to a white congregation. His sermons called on Methodists to reject slavery and champion the common working man. At the same time, he told his black audiences "that they must be holy", which criticism displeased no small number of them.

As with most early Methodist preachers, he was a circuit-rider and traveled from Cainhoy, South Carolina, to Boston, Massachusetts, usually in attendance with Asbury. Having grown used to the relative freedom of Philadelphia, Pennsylvania, he was at first unwilling to return south to Virginia and the Carolinas. Asbury was generally anxious to have him come, though, as Hosier's reputation preceded him and news of his coming would draw larger crowds than the bishop alone.

John Wesley's representative Thomas Coke was hosted by Asbury in 1784 and 1786. Touring Delaware, Maryland, and Virginia, Coke wrote in his journal that Hosier was "one of the best preachers in the world" and yet "one of the humblest creatures I ever saw". Hosier was present at the Christmas Conference from December 24, 1784, to January 2, 1785, at Lovely Lane Chapel in Baltimore, Maryland, where the Methodist Episcopal Church of America was formally founded. Along with Richard Allen, he was permitted to observe but not vote on any of the items before the conference.

He made a sensation in New York accompanying Asbury there in September 1786. Touring Connecticut and Massachusetts with Freeborn Garrettson, Hosier stayed with Prince Hall, "master mason for the Africans", and preached in Boston before a crowd of a thousand.

In 1791, an erroneous accusation against him led to the exclusion of Hosier within the church. The Rev. Henry Boehm credited his "fall" to Hosier's pride in his work: "poor Harry was so petted and made so much of that he became lifted up". The Carolinian elder Rev. Jenkins was less circumspect: he described "some difficulties" with "an influential colored man, who desired further promotion within the church". Jenkins proclaimed he "generally found that these people cannot bear promotion: like too many white people, they become proud". Hosier was not included in the group of black Methodist preachers who were ordained in 1799. At the end of his life, Hosier was found drunk and scavenging garbage looking for cloth to sell as rags. He subsequently preached that he wrestled with God and screamed Psalm 51 repeatedly before recovering and carrying on his ministry.

== See also ==
- Hoosier
- Bishop Francis Asbury
- Henry Evans (preacher)
- John Chavis
- Bishop Richard Allen
- Absalom Jones
- Jarena Lee
- Joseph Willis (minister)
