= History of Falls Church =

Falls Church, an independent city in Virginia, United States, takes its name from The Falls Church, an 18th-century parish of the Church of England. Falls Church gained township status within Fairfax County in 1875. In 1948, it was incorporated as the City of Falls Church, an independent city with county-level governance status.

== Prehistory and European colonization ==
Northern Virginia, before Europeans explored it, was firmly governed by the Iroquois Confederacy—a consortium of Native American nations and peoples including the Tauxenents, Patawomekes, and Matchotics. Local inhabitants considered the Little Falls of the Potomac River significant—it is the first "cataract", or barrier, to navigation on the river.

The word "Potomac" is Native American for "gathering place", reflecting the river's service as both a highway and location for trading.

Captain John Smith of England was the first European to explore the Potomac as far as Little Falls. "As for deer, buffaloes, bears and turkeys, the woods do swarm with them and the soil is extremely fertile", he wrote.

The Colony of Virginia grew out of these explorations, and English settlers may have established themselves at the site of modern-day Falls Church as early as 1699. A cottage demolished between 1908 and 1914, two blocks from the city center, bore a stone engraved with the date "1699" set into one of its two large chimneys. The house is unmentioned in colonial-era land grants and land records and its origin remains unknown.

Indian trails meandered past the site of the 1699 cabin—an east-west one generally following the route of modern Broad Street, and one branching off from it to the Little Falls of the Potomac—today's Little Falls Street. By the 1730s, these trails became important transportation routes.

In 1734, The Falls Church—as it came to be known—was founded at its present site next to the intersection of the important Indian trails. At that time, churches were outposts of government as well as worship. The church's establishment reflected the desire of Colony leaders and the Church of England—the colony's official church—to make inroads in the vast wilderness of Northern Virginia. Two acres were purchased from local landowner John Trammell; a carpenter named Richard Blackburn built a wooden church.

This stood until 1769, when the present brick church was designed and built by architect James Wren. George Washington, the future president, kept the bricklayer at his home in Mount Vernon. Unable to find enough paid laborers to build the church, Wren, a slaveowner, used enslaved people to do the work.

Originally called "the crossroads near Michael Reagan's", the site of the church first appears on a map dated 1747, and is labeled the "Upper Church". It was also called "the church up at the falls", and then eventually, The Falls Church.

The church was on the route of British colonial troops en route to the forks of the Ohio River on April 7, 1755. Part of Major General Edward Braddock's British army engaged in fighting the French during the French and Indian War. Modern-day Broad Street was locally called Braddock's Road for decades afterward.

== War of Independence ==
Important and influential men attended The Falls Church and served as its vestrymen, including George Washington; George Mason, who would write the Bill of Rights to the U.S. Constitution; John West; and Charles Broadwater.

When colonial relations with Great Britain began souring, the Colony of Virginia helped lead the resistance. these vestrymen were deeply involved. Mason wrote the "Fairfax Resolves", a call for 24 specific actions. The men were members of Virginia's revolutionary council meeting in Williamsburg, the royal capital. The council instructed Virginia's delegates at the Continental Congress in Philadelphia to introduce a resolution calling for independence. Virginia's delegate did so, and the Congress passed the motion on July 2. The Declaration of Independence was issued July 4. It is said a copy of the declaration arrived from Philadelphia and was read to citizens from the steps of The Falls Church sometime during the summer of 1776. Falls Church leaders recruited men to serve in the colonial militia.

Appointed to lead the Continental Army, Washington remained a Falls Church vestryman until resigning his post in 1784, having been unable to attend to his church duties. He later was elected first president of the United States.

== Federal Capital Territory ==
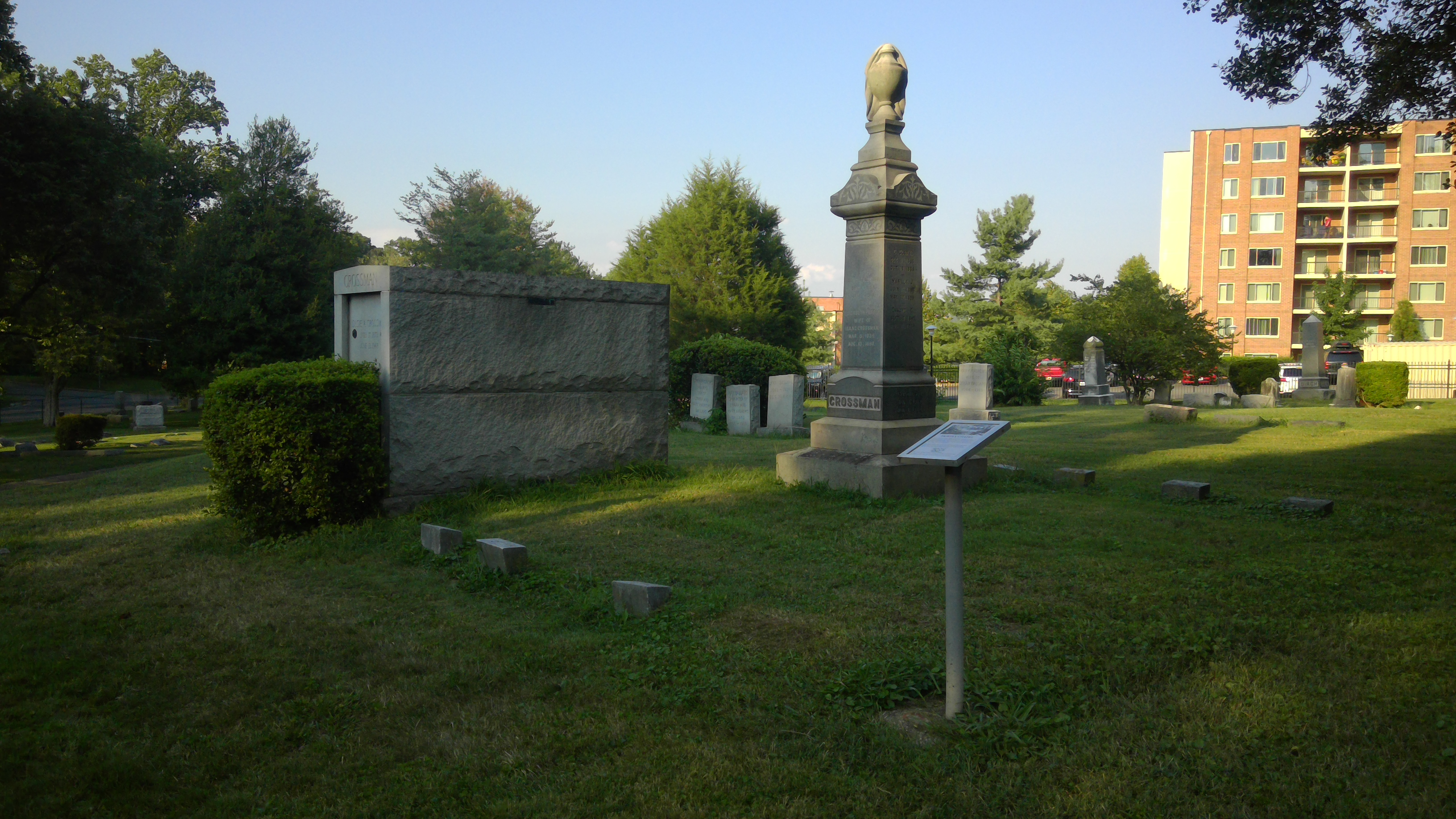
Site of Fairfax Chapel in 2017

Methodism came to the Falls Church area in 1776—a different kind of revolution—as church meetings began to be held on "Church Hill", a home at present-day Seven Corners. In 1779, the wooden Adams's Chapel or Fairfax Chapel was built in what is now Oakwood Cemetery in Falls Church's eastern end. This was the site of "Black Harry" Hosier's first sermon in 1781. The original church was replaced with another building and finally by a sturdy and substantial brick chapel in 1819. The structure was still in use until torn down by Union soldiers during the Civil War in 1862.

In 1790, the District of Columbia was created. It was surveyed in 1791–1792, and boundary marker stones were placed in the wilderness at one-mile (1.6 km) intervals. Two are in the City of Falls Church today: the West Cornerstone on Meridian Street, marking what is now the intersection of the boundaries of the City of Falls Church, Arlington County, and Fairfax County; and the Southwest 9 stone on Van Buren Street.

In about 1800, Fairfax County built a new court house. It was designed by James Wren, a Falls Church innkeeper who also designed The Falls Church. Both buildings survive and are in use today. Wren's inn was well known. President Thomas Jefferson wrote Secretary of State James Madison in 1801, warning him of the perilous nature of the public roads in Northern Virginia, and advised, "You had better start as soon as you can see to drive, breakfast at Colonel Wren's, and come here for dinner."

== The War of 1812 ==
War with Britain loomed again, and what some historians call the "Second War of Independence" broke out in 1812. By 1814 the tide had turned against the Americans. In August British forces, marching overland through Maryland, threatened the capital city.

The federal government fled. Colonel George Minor of Minor's Hill—overlooking Falls Church—and his 700-man Virginia Militia 60th Regiment were summoned from Falls Church on August 23, 1814, to Washington, which they were assigned to defend. However, due to bureaucratic bungling among War Department officials, they were not sent to help defend the approaches to Washington at Bladensburg, Maryland, nor did many of them come armed.

As events at the Battle of Bladensburg worsened, government officials began evacuating the city. At that time the Washington Navy Yard was an important fleet center, and its gunpowder was hurriedly moved across the bridges into Virginia, and brought to Falls Church for safekeeping, protected by a six-man guard dispatched by Colonel Minor.

Government officials also fled the city, including President James Madison, who came to Minor's Hill looking for his wife, Dolley—a friend of the colonel's wife—before hurrying downhill into Falls Church. He, the nation's attorney general, and his entourage struggled through the chaotic and crowded roads toward Falls Church, eventually arriving at Wren's Tavern.

Mrs. Madison, separated in the chaos of that night from her husband, fled to the safety of Colonel Minor's home on Minor's Hill, and spent two nights there.

British troops torched Washington, burning it to the ground. The conflagration lit the nighttime skies at Falls Church, where a young refugee from Alexandria later recalled being awakened and taken outside to see Washington burn. "At first I thought the world was on fire. Such a flame I have never seen since."

== Internal improvements ==
Local internal improvements were initiated in 1829 by the private Middle Turnpike Company, which built a turnpike to connect the end of King Street in Alexandria to Dranesville, from where it connected with the Leesburg Turnpike. From Alexandria through Falls Church it followed the colonial-era ridge road. Tolls began being collected in 1839.

Another new road connected Falls Church with other points east in 1852, when the new Aqueduct Road connected a bridge by the same name across the Potomac River with Fairfax Court House. Its route from the river to Falls Church became modern-day Wilson Boulevard.

Roads helped connect Falls Church with larger trading centers, and the village began to prosper. A larger population called for more forms of religious expression, and a local Presbyterian congregation was launched in 1848. Columbia Baptist Church was formed in 1856 and built itself a two-story wooden New England–style church house on East Broad Street, adjacent to The Falls Church.

Rail travel arrived in 1860 when the Alexandria, Loudoun & Hampshire Railroad opened. The railroad linked Alexandria with Virginia's mountain counties. It shortened the transit from Falls Church to Alexandria from a half-day on the Turnpike to only 35 minutes on the train.

A post office was established at Falls Church in 1849. New residents, many from northern states, were arriving and building fine homes. Solid and unpretentious, but well-built, many of these are still in existence today, and their architectural styles recall their owners' New England and Upper Atlantic origins and craftsmanship.

== The Civil War ==
The American Civil War was a turning point in the history of Falls Church. Before the war it was a sleepy and rural Southern community. During Reconstruction and later, however, many of its institutions and families were splintered, and its landscape was altered for decades.

=== Setting the stage ===
Before the war Falls Church was not entirely Southern in nature. Numerous northern-born residents had moved to the area, building fine homes and establishing profitable farms and businesses. They lived in harmony with Falls Church's native Virginians.

This all changed with the fateful—and unsuccessful—raid by radical abolitionist John Brown on the federal arsenal at Harper's Ferry. Brown, who was captured by U.S. authorities and hanged, inspired a groundswell of support throughout the North for the abolition of slavery. Southerners were shocked. For the first time, the picture had been painted in starkly differing terms. Northerners appeared willing—even eager—to overturn the established order throughout the South, with clear and grave injury to those who lived there, it seemed to Southerners.

In Fairfax County, the issue of slavery became a subject of much discussion. Feelings and differences hardened. Events far to the south framed the debate almost in an almost electrifying manner. South Carolina seceded from the Union in December 1860, followed in quick order by several other Deep South states. In Virginia, the viewpoint was much more moderate. Many called for calm and appealed for peace. The matter was put to a referendum on May 23, 1861, and Virginians went to polling stations to decide the future of the Commonwealth.

Feelings throughout the Falls Church region were inflamed by this point, and the polling did not take place peacefully. Armed men belonging to Virginia's Rappahannock Cavalry and Fairfax Cavalry intimidated pro-Union voters, many of whom felt physically threatened. In the days following, many northern-born residents fled Falls Church to the safety of Washington.

Virginia voters removed the Commonwealth from the Union. In Fairfax County, the vote was overwhelmingly for secession. In Falls Church, the vote was closer: 44–26 in favor of secession. On that day and in following days, families split over the secession question. Churches closed as their congregations failed and congregants fled. Columbia Baptist Church—considered primarily a Northern church—was set aflame, presumably by Southern sympathizers.

=== At the precipice ===
In the summer of 1861, many local men enlisted in various Virginia military regiments and left the area to join the growing Confederate army.

Northern commanders were certain the would-be Southern army would soon be vanquished, once and for all. Their theory was soon tested by the war's first massive engagement—at Manassas, Virginia, only 23 miles (37 km) from Falls Church. As the battle wore on, the roar of the thundering cannon was clearly heard in Falls Church. Soon weary Union soldiers began passing through Falls Church, heading toward Washington. The few became many, and finally it was clear the Union army was in chaotic retreat from what was becoming a catastrophic loss to the south.

Thousands of soldiers streamed through Falls Church, in a rush for the safety of Washington. The Confederate Army was close behind, and soon had occupied the village as well as the hills immediately to its east: Munson's and Upton's hills, with their views overlooking Washington, D.C., itself.

During that summer Falls Church became regional Confederate headquarters—what is now the historic Lawton House, on Lawton Street, hosted General P.G.T. Beauregard, and others—as the Confederate government grappled with what to do next. Invade Washington from its powerful perch along the hills?

Confederate regiments made incursions across what is now Arlington County as far as Ball's Crossroads—modern Ballston—and lethal firefights occurred constantly as the lines of the two armies became entangled. From Munson's Hill the Southerners could clearly see the U.S. Capitol, and much of the city, through their looking glasses (telescopes), and the broad, flat plain of Bailey's Crossroads became a "killing field" as sharpshooters killed anyone seen walking there.

On September 28, 1861 this stage of events ended. Confederate troops withdrew quietly from Falls Church and its hills, retreating to the heights at Centreville, which they fortified. The Southern leadership decided an all-out attack on Washington would likely fail, given they had to cross the river bridges to do it. And staying in Falls Church seemed risky—their supply lines could easily be broken by the Union army if it launched pincer movements from Chain Bridge southward. Centreville, by contrast, was located adjacent to the interior of Virginia, with which it had excellent road and railroad connections.

Union troops quickly reoccupied Munson's and Upton's hills, and much of Falls Church itself, although the village was never entirely brought under Union rule.

=== A difficult journey ===
From this point armed conflict shifted to the south, and later to the west and north. Falls Church and its hills, which had been featured prominently in the international press, faded from public view. But the area remained perennially unsettled. Union rule did not extend much past the modern-day city center; areas just a few hundred yards to the south and west, along what is now West Broad Street and South Washington Street, entered "rebel territory" where Northerners went only under armed guard.

Small firefights were common in these areas, and occasionally larger clashes occurred. In November 1861, large forces of Confederate cavalry engaged an outgunned New York regiment in the vicinity of present-day Lee Highway and West Street, and also Lakeford Drive. Several hundred soldiers took part in these clashes, one of which played a role in making national history.

The clash in question, at Binn's Hill (Lee Highway at West Street), interrupted a Union troop review under way on Upton's Hill. The review ended quickly as soldiers quickly deployed toward Falls Church to relieve the outgunned New Yorkers. An observer, Julia Ward Howe—who had shared a carriage from Washington to Upton's Hill with the governor of Massachusetts and several other notables—returned with them to the city. It was after dark, and Howe was struck by the mental images—of burnished arms glittering in the flame from hundreds of campfires. On the way back their carriage shared the narrow Aqueduct Road (modern Wilson Boulevard) with soldiers, who sang as the marched.

One song they sang was John Brown's Body. "John Brown's body lies a-mouldering in the grave…", the lyrics went. One person in the carriage, knowing Howe sometimes wrote poetry, suggested she should pen new, less violent words to the tune. "How I wish I might!", Howe responded.

Early the next morning, she awakened in her hotel room and quickly penned new lyrics. Published in Atlantic Monthly in February 1862, "Battle Hymn of the Republic" quickly became popular throughout the North.

Another battle was fought at Manassas: the Second Battle of Manassas, ending in a second resounding loss for the Union. Washington again was shocked, and threatened by the possibility of Confederate invasion. The balance of power was again shifting in the Falls Church area, the presumed path to be taken by the Confederates.

Fortifications atop Upton's Hill were quickly manned, and area fortifications were expanded. New forts were built: Fort Ramsay, on Upton's Hill at the present-day intersection of Wilson Boulevard with McKinley Avenue; and Fort Buffalo, in present-day Seven Corners, at the intersection of Leesburg Pike and Sleepy Hollow Road. Photographs and lithographs show them to be large masonry forts bearing numerous cannon emplacements and hundreds of soldiers.

Minor's Hill, overlooking the village of Falls Church from the north, did not host formal earthworks or large-scale fortifications, but became home to at least seven Union regiments of soldiers from throughout the Northern states. Only then did Washington feel more secure.

The only known full-color lithograph of Falls Church depicts Camp Owen, the encampment of the 11th Rhode Island Infantry Regiment, on Minor's Hill. It shows rows of orderly tents, parading soldiers, visiting dignitaries, and prancing ponies. It was published as the cover to the history of the Civil War in Falls Church, entitled A Virginia Village Goes to War: Falls Church During the Civil War. The original lithograph is now on file in the public library in Falls Church, as are copies of the book.

=== The Gray Ghosts ===
As the war ground toward an unsteady conclusion, Southern guerrillas made their mark. One group of soldiers, known as Mosby's Raiders, were so effective at slipping in and out of the areas they targeted that their leader, Colonel John Mosby, was called the "Gray Ghost". The raiders made several armed incursions into the heart of Falls Church in 1864 and 1865, the last occurring no more than a couple of months before General Robert E. Lee surrendered his army at Appomattox. They were attempting to kidnap and kill suspected Northern sympathizers who were thought to be aiding the Northern army.

One nocturnal raid netted John Read, a local minister who broke Virginia law by teaching black slaves to read. He was also accused of passing intelligence on to Northern army agents. He was shot and killed twelve miles (19 km) west of Falls Church, and his teenage daughter and wife were granted safe passage the next day to come for his body. He is buried in the graveyard of the Falls Church (Episcopal).

=== War's end ===
The North never won the war in the Falls Church area. The area was never pacified, and federal troops had to garrison it in large numbers through the end of the conflict. With the Southern surrender things became much quieter in the village, as local residents returned to their homes and put down swords for ploughshares.

In the years to follow, Falls Church recovered its prosperity. Local farmers tore down the massive earthworks and fortifications so the pastures and fields could be used again. The Falls Church (Episcopal) was repaired by the government. But some institutional divisions remained. The Methodist congregation fragmented into three as a result of the war: Dulin United Methodist Church was the Southern congregation, Christ Crossman was the Northern congregation, and Galloway was the African-American congregation.

Almost all Civil War sites would be built over in the development wave of the 1950s. Upton's and Munson's hills now host a large shopping center and its satellite centers called Seven Corners, and homes cover almost all other sites.

== Post-war growth ==
In 1875, Falls Church was incorporated as a town. Its first town ordinance regulated fireworks, guns, and pistols. That same year saw the establishment of a public elementary school for white students. Classes were held in Columbia Baptist Church until 1882, when the Jefferson Institute Elementary School opened on North Cherry Street. Built of brick with an imposing belfry, it would serve until it was torn down in 1956.

After the Civil War, local African-Americans established prosperous communities in an area then called South Falls Church, along Tinner's Hill and elsewhere. Frederick Forrest Foote, Jr., a local black man, served as a Falls Church town council member from 1880 to 1889. Foote's election to council followed the time of Reconstruction imposed on former Confederate states and illustrated the high regard in which he was held by local townspeople. But in 1887, white Falls Church residents gerrymandered the heavily black South Falls Church out of the town limits in order to reduce black influence in the town and the region. This was never reversed, and caused the boundary of the future City of Falls Church to follow South Washington Street.

In 1885, the Village Improvement Society was founded. It became the premier cultural organization, and continues today as the Village Preservation and Improvement Society.

== Spanish–American War ==
War with Spain in 1898, at first blush, had little to do with Falls Church. However, it came to affect it in big ways.

Local resident Parker Galpin, whose family farm was in what is now Seven Corners, was aboard the USS Maine when the ship exploded and sank in Havana harbor. Galpin survived, unlike many shipmates.

Once the war began in earnest, the military began looking for training grounds for Army recruits near Washington, D.C. It obtained farmland just outside Falls Church: two square miles south of Lee Highway, bounded by Graham Road, Gallows Road, and extending south of what is now U.S. Route 50. This became Camp Alger, home of the U.S. Second Corps: more than 20 regiments comprising almost 30,000 soldiers.

Transportation and logistics were problematic. East Falls Church's railroad station was overwhelmed; local residents pressed their horses and buggies into service providing taxi service to and from the camp.

Potable water was in short supply. After Typhoid fever broke out in mid-July 1898, the soldiers blamed this lack of water, and called it "Water Typhoid." Most of the 73 soldiers who died at the camp were killed by Typhoid.

On May 22, 1898, President William McKinley brought cabinet secretaries and dignitaries for a grand review of troops. The president arrived by train at East Falls Church, where he was met by an honor guard of troops, who proudly escorted him to the camp. But as some 15,000 soldiers paraded before the president,

... the yellow Virginia dust commenced to rise, and with the pounding of almost 200 horses' hoofs on a heavy trot, the suffocating ochreous cloud was so thick that only the troopers directly in front could be distinguished, and then only as faint silhouettes, the sides of the road being lost to view. After a bit the order came to part, allowing the presidential party, which had been choking in the dust, to the forefront.

The War of 1898 was the country's shortest war. In quick time, the U.S. Navy sank the Spanish fleets at Cuba and the Philippines, and the war concluded. Camp Alger closed, although it was described as "a bleak sand waste" for years to come.

== The 20th century dawns ==
Falls Church, as Fairfax County's largest town, was also its most modern and advanced. Within a few years of the turn of the century it had acquired a town library, telephone, telegraph, and electric and gas service. By 1904, the town's first historian described Falls Church as the place where

... the tired city man can afford all of the enjoyment of retirement and tranquility. With an abundance of green lawns, well shaded walks and drives, pure water, good schools and the necessary stores, what more could the seeker desire to complete his ideal of a country home. Falls Church welcomes the jaded fathers and mothers from the city to the place where children may enjoy life with nature, where the climate, conducive to refreshing sleep, soothes tired nerves and makes life to such again buoyant with youthful hopes and joys.

== World War I ==
The outbreak of World War I in 1914 nearly brought a new military installation to Falls Church. Once again—as it had in the War of 1898—the U.S. War Department began scouting out land near Washington which to establish a training base for soldiers. Army officials inspected old Camp Alger, perhaps as a result of the intensive efforts of the Fairfax Herald to excite interest in the site. "SELECT OLD CAMP ALGER", the newspaper boomed.

The Army felt otherwise, however, and selected instead the site which is known today as Fort Belvoir. That installation, with its present-day extensive military infrastructure and thousands of employees, would have meant a very different Falls Church.

Falls Church residents, like those everywhere, experienced the difficulties of wartime living. They were urged to observe meatless Tuesdays and wheatless Mondays and Wednesdays—with at least one meal per day being meatless and another being wheatless. In support of this effort they ate an unappetizing concoction called "Victory Bread", which was wheatless bread prepared using alternative ingredients. Wheat was later joined by sugar and flour among the list of rationed foods.

Nonetheless, residents were urged to give, give, and give some more—and they did. Several societies, such as the Village Improvement Society (today's Village Preservation and Improvement Society) led fundraising drives and Liberty Loan drives, netting surprising amounts of money.

Mass movements of refugees and soldiers during the war enabled and unleashed one of the world's worst plagues—the so-called Spanish flu (so-named because even the king of Spain came down with it), which went on to attack almost 50% of the world's population. Falls Church and the portions of Fairfax County closest to Alexandria were particularly hard hit. Schools and churches closed and all meetings of any kind were suspended for over a month in October and November 1918, in an attempt to break the chain of transmission. Before the influenza subsided it killed 531 people in Fairfax County, which included Falls Church.

World War I is especially memorable in Falls Church history for knitting together the last vestiges of separation left from an earlier war. At the close of the American Civil War the northern-born and southern-born residents of Falls Church each kept to themselves, with long memories of who was who. This ended during World War I, as the village formed a home defense league, the Colonial Rifles, which was active throughout the war. The ensuing sense of patriotism united these two groups in a sense of neighborliness and common cause they had not shared since 1860.

Yet this "neighborliness" did not stop the white-controlled Falls Church town council from enacting Jim Crow laws to bring racial segregation to their town. In January 1915, three years after such laws were endorsed by the Virginia state legislature, the council passed an ordinance forbidding black people to live outside specified areas. After Edwin Bancroft Henderson and other civil rights leaders spoke up against the law, a burning cross was placed on Henderson's lawn along with a threatening note signed "KKK": "As you're sleeping one night, you may be awakened by some men in white robes who will drag you outside and apply 40 lashes to your Ethiopian backside". Undeterred, Henderson filed several lawsuits that prevented the law from taking effect, and the U.S. Supreme Court struck down such laws in 1917. These and other efforts led to the creation of the first rural chapter of the NAACP.

== Inter-war years ==
As the post-war economy accelerated into the "Roaring Twenties", the lack of roads became increasingly seen as a bar to growth and development. "The automobile was born into a roadless world," mused one Washington editorialist. This was certainly true in Falls Church. It was an era in which roads and highways developed by local usage and not through concerted government policy. They bore names, not numbers, and were usually short-haul transportation routes.

Falls Church came to benefit from the efforts of a national group called the Lee Highway Association, which endeavored to build a coast-to-coast highway across the southern United States, to be named in honor of Robert E. Lee. The group aimed to match efforts to build a similar highway across the northern tier of states, to be named for Abraham Lincoln. The national project echoed efforts in cities and towns across the South to venerate Confederate leaders and promote Lost Cause pseudohistory during the nadir of American race relations; its first executive director proclaimed the traitorous Lee "a great American".

But the proposal was met with great eagerness by white Falls Church businessmen, who convinced the Association to route the new highway through the town. They formed a local branch of the association, which rallied efforts, paid substantial subscription fees, and arranged large-scale private financing to get the road built. They road they proffered—the present Lee Highway, U.S. Route 29—was barely a road but in name. Between Falls Church and Fairfax Court House, it was a narrow dirt track.

Their efforts paid off handsomely—at least for real estate agents in Falls Church, who reported tenfold increases in sales and doubling in value of property near the new highway. But the road meant yet more disruption for the area's African Americans: it was paved through the black neighborhood of Tinner Hill, and bisected the property of Edwin Henderson, the civil-rights activist who had thwarted the town's housing-segregation ordinance.

Buoyed by its success, the Lee Highway Association's local chapters immediately began plugging for a new Lee Memorial Boulevard: a landscaped parkway to link Washington, D.C., with the Shenandoah Valley. Falls Church businessmen were among its most ardent financial backers, and the road—now Arlington Boulevard (U.S. Route 50)—was to pass directly through Falls Church. But the economics of providing as much available road frontage caused them to shift the route just outside the town limit, so that it passed to the south and through what is now Seven Corners.

There were several Falls Churches to begin with: South Falls Church, the black neighborhood gerrymandered to Fairfax County in the 1880s and soon ceased to be called such; West Falls Church and the village center of Falls Church, sometimes just called "the village", both of which were in Fairfax County, and East Falls Church, which was in Arlington County. The three together formed the Town of Falls Church, which straddled the county boundary.

Sentiment for separation of East Falls Church was first raised in 1921, and simmered until separation occurred in 1936—a result of its disgruntled citizens, who cited "intolerable confusion of overlapping governmental agencies." East Falls Church ceased to exist, and much of it today lies under the route of Interstate Highway 66.

The interwar years saw the first of what would be many contentious fights over trees in Falls Church. Increasing traffic caused the state highway department to plan to cut the beautiful silver maples lining Falls Church's Broad Street. As community opposition to the plans grew, even the Parent-Teacher Association became involved—on the side of the trees, of course. Both sides managed victory: the aging trees were cut and the street was widened, and the state highway department planted new shade trees to line it.

In the late 1930s, Loren Pope, a Falls Church resident, sought to hire architect Frank Lloyd Wright to design his new home. "Of course I will give you a house," Lloyd Wright responded. The Pope-Leighey House, as it would later be called, was built at 1005 Locust Street, just outside the town limit. Nestled in rolling woodland, the house was a Usonian home with concrete floors coated with red-colored wax, piano hinges on the doors, and radiant heating. Wright visited Falls Church numerous times during construction in 1940.

== World War II ==
After the Japanese bombing of Pearl Harbor, Falls Church and Fairfax County, of which the town was still a part, began immediate preparations for World War II. Rubber came to be in short supply due to the loss of the rubber plantations of Southeast Asia to the Japanese. Several foods also came to be rationed. In all, rationing was soon observed for gasoline, shoes, farm machinery, long-distance telephone service, stoves, fat, sugar, coffee, and processed foods.

Falls Church established an aircraft observation post at Oakwood Cemetery, and staffed it 24 hours per day, seven days per week, with 350 volunteers. They were known as air raid wardens, and maintained responsibility for the sky watch all the way to Washington. Their hilltop headquarters in the cemetery was linked by special telephone to a command and control facility.

During part of the war, until the invasions of Europe, General Dwight D. Eisenhower stayed in Falls Church with his brother, Milton, whose home was Tallwood, on East Broad Street. Later the general, who worked 18-hour days, wrote, "I cannot remember ever seeing their house in daylight during all the months I served in Washington." Upon the general's arrival home each night Milton's wife, Helen, always prepared the general a pot of cocoa to help him get to sleep.

== Post-war prosperity and municipal independence ==
A massive wave of development washed over the Falls Church area as it participated in the rapid growth of the greater Washington area. Fields and farms, which had always separated the town from its neighbors, were rapidly developed into housing. Seven Corners, one of the region's first suburban shopping malls, opened in 1956. Its success was followed by the opening of Tyson's Corner in 1966. Their cumulative effect was to shrink Falls Church's business market considerably.

Nonetheless, Falls Church opted to leave Fairfax County and form an independent city in 1948. Its reasons were simple: town residents valued education, and wanted better schools with as few blacks as possible. Fairfax County, then very rural, was not keen to devote more money to improve its schools. Almost immediately after municipal independence in 1958 a modernization and rebuilding program was launched for the city's schools, and music and arts programs were started. The racial school segregation that had long been practiced in Falls Church went unchanged by the establishment of the new school system; the 30 or so black students who lived in the town were forced to attend a segregated school in Fairfax County. Still, in 1961, the Falls Church school district would become just the second in Virginia to decide to desegregate.

Passenger railroad service—enjoyed by area residents since 1860—ended in 1951 as the Washington & Old Dominion Railroad closed its passenger operations. Freight service continued until 1968, when the railroad closed. Its track was removed and its railroad bed became the basis for a regional park extending from Alexandria to Purcellville in the foothills of the mountains.

Another kind of rail transit soon began, however. A Metro (subway) system opened in Washington in 1976, and was extended to West Falls Church in 1986. Traveling for much of its route along the right-of-way of the new Interstate 66—which itself opened in 1984—the Metro was originally envisioned to travel under Wilson Boulevard and enter Falls Church at Seven Corners. The system has two stations, in eastern and western Falls Church, although neither are within the city limit.

Interstate 66 was originally conceived to be part of a much more massive interstate highway complex, of which it was to be one of several radial highways departing Washington in all directions. In addition, the capital city was to be surrounded by three beltways, of which only the proposed middle one and portions of an inner one were built. Construction of Interstate 66 caused Falls Church to lose one of its most highly prized homes—the Pope-Leighey House, which was threatened with destruction but moved to Woodlawn Plantation in southern Alexandria. Ironically, its original homesite on Locust Street was untouched, but falls within the interstate highway's right-of-way.

== The modern era ==
Aerial view of Falls Church in the 1990s

Falls Church celebrated its 300th presumed anniversary in 1999—using the date 1699 as its point of origin. The tricentennial anniversary was celebrated for a full year.

Since that time the city has seen rapid growth along its prime commercial corridor, West Broad Street. This occurred, perhaps not coincidentally, after the city rebuilt and replanted the street to make it more appealing. The reconstruction reestablished shade trees along the length of the street and added street furniture and landscaping, in addition to placing utility lines underground. The sharp economic recession of the late-2000s brought most development to a halt.

According to a 2010 report, the City of Falls Church ranks second in the United States for the number of its citizens holding advanced academic degrees. Only Los Alamos, New Mexico, has more.
