= Global Frontier Missions =

Christian organization

Global Frontier Missions (GFM) is an evangelical Christian 501(c)(3) non-profit Frontier Missions organization headquartered in Clarkston, Georgia, United States.

== History ==
GFM was founded in 2000 by Grant and Jennifer Haynes, while serving as missionaries to Oaxaca, Mexico. GFM currently reaches out to refugees, immigrants, and international students in Atlanta, Georgia and Richmond, Virginia. The vision of GFM is to expand to several new international cities such as Jacksonville, Florida; Bangkok, Thailand; and more.

GFM describes itself as "a movement of Christ-centered communities dedicated to mobilizing, training, and multiply disciples and churches to meet the physical and spiritual needs among the least reached people groups of the earth." They host short-term mission trips, summer internships, missionary training schools, and missionary residencies. Global Frontier Missions is a member of the Evangelical Council for Financial Accountability and the Standards of Excellence for Short Term Mission (SOE).

GFM partners with Christian missions organizations and networks around the globe such as Africa Inland Mission, Christar, Cafe1040, East West Ministries, Frontiers, Pioneers, and SIM.
