= Andrew Traynor =

American Medal of Honor recipient

- Born: February 9, 1843; Newark, New Jersey, US
- Died: June 6, 1920 (aged 77); Omaha, Nebraska, US
- Burial place: Omaha, Nebraska
- Military career
- Allegiance: United States of America
- Branch: United States Army
- Service years: 1861–1865
- Rank: Corporal
- Units: Company D, 1st Michigan Cavalry
- Conflicts: American Civil War
- Awards: Medal of Honor

Andrew Traynor (February 9, 1843 – July 6, 1920) was an American soldier who fought in the American Civil War. Traynor received the Medal of Honor for his action in Mason's Hill, Virginia, on March 16, 1864.

== Biography ==
Traynor was born in Newark, New Jersey, on February 9, 1843. He enlisted into the 1st Michigan Cavalry's Company D at the age of 18 in 1861. He received the Medal of Honor on September 28, 1897, for helping his fellow prisoners escape from their captors. In 1864, the Union had several cavalry brigades push down to the James River. On March 16, under orders from his commanding officer, Traynor and another soldier were scouting in thick forests near Mason's Hill, which was used by 1st Virginia Cavalry as an outpost as well as a signalling post. They were suddenly ambushed by four heavily armed guerrillas, who took them to another group of captured prisoners.

In Deeds of Valor (p. 309), Traynor recounts of the action that resulted in his awarding of the Medal of Honor:

"Here it was that I communicated my intention to escape, telling my companions to watch me closely and keep by my side. Selecting an opportune moment, I sprang at the two guards, and, before they could fire their guns or otherwise give a signal, I was engaged in a sharp struggle with both. They were able bodies and well-armed men, but my attack had been so sudden and well directed that almost in an instant I had both of their guns and had handed one to the civilian, who had kept right at my elbow.

Just then the other two guerrillas returned hastily and before they could realize the situation, the civilian and I both fired, each one dropping a man. At this moment, the two disarmed guerrillas made their escape in one direction, while my five companions and myself made our escape in an opposite direction."

After escaping the guerrillas, Traynor and another prisoner were soon spotted by other guerrillas in the area and were pursued until they finally reached Union positions. He was awarded the Medal of Honor thirty-three years later on September 28, 1897. Traynor later moved to Omaha, Nebraska and died there on July 6, 1920.

== Medal of Honor citation ==
Citation: Having been surprised and captured by a detachment of guerrillas, this soldier, with other prisoners, seized the arms of the guard over them, killed 2 of the guerrillas, and enabled all the prisoners to escape.

== See also ==
- List of Medal of Honor recipients
- List of American Civil War Medal of Honor recipients: T–Z
