= Joseph Willis (minister) =

American minister

Marker for Willis, erected by the Louisiana Baptist Convention.

Joseph Willis was a 19th-century free African-American minister who has been described by some historians as the "father of the Baptist religion in Louisiana".

== Biography ==
Joseph Willis was born 1758 (Note: He has alternatively written to be born on 1762.), either free or as a slave in historic Bladen County. (Note: He has alternatively described to have been born in South Carolina.) His manumission was described to have occurred in 1787. (Note: Another source describes him in Louisiana by 1780, being prevented from preaching the Protestant faith.) His father was an English planter, and his mother had been an African-American slave. He moved with his family to the Cheraw District in 1790, then Greenville County in 1794, where they lived until the turn of the century. The family moved to Natchez, Mississippi in 1801 (Note: He has alternatively described to have been in Mississippi before 1798.), then Vermillion Parish, Louisiana in 1804. That year, Willis preached the first Trans-Mississippi Protestant sermon.

=== Baptist church in Louisiana ===
In November of 1812, Willis founded the first Baptist church west of the Mississippi in Louisiana, at Bayou Chicot. The congregation had both white and African-American membership. He then became a circuit preacher in west-central Louisiana, suggested to have first arrived there between 1813–1818.

He assisted in the founding of four other churches, Beulah, Debourn, Vermilion, and Plaquemines. In 1818, Willis led the organization of the five churches into the Louisiana Baptist Convention as its first moderator, which he continued as for several years.

=== Settlement ===
Near the end of his life, he settled in Ten Mile Creek. He was accompanied by other families, known as Redbones. He began his pastorate at this settlement in 1833, at Occupy #1 Church. He died in 1858 and was buried in the Occupy Cemetery.

== Legacy ==
Calvary Baptist Church, 2018.

Aimwell, Louisiana is the namesake of Joseph's oldest son, Aimwell.

Scholar Ansley Quiros relates Willis to John Chavis, Harry Hosier, and Henry Evans, describing them as unlicensed Black lay preachers who mediated between slaves and the Christian faith. Scholar Kenneth K. Bailey also related Willis to Hiram R. Revels, John Day, and Nelson Merry.

Scholar John Catron gives Willis as an example of the westward movement of transnational Black Protestant religion shaped by 'Afro-Atlantic' spirituality. He writes that Willis had been empowered by other Black churches in Charleston, Savannah, Wilmington and the Caribbean.

== See also ==
- Aimwell, Louisiana
- Bayou Chicot, Louisiana
- Frontier missions
- Gardner C. Taylor
- Henry Evans (preacher)
- John Chavis
- Redbones
- Religion of Black Americans
- William Hicks (pastor)
- William Prince Ford
