= Black Harry (Sint Eustatius) =

Methodist preacher

Black Harry was a legendary Methodist preacher of African descent who worked on Sint Eustatius, Dutch Caribbean in the 1780s and was eventually banned from the island for his beliefs.

== Name ==
Black Harry's real name is unknown. At the same time in the United States, there was also an African-American Methodist preacher known as Black Harry. His full name was Harry Hosier. Despite the remarkable similarities in the lives of these two men, multiple studies say that the Black Harry of Sint Eustatius and Harry Hosier were not the same preacher.

== Life ==
Where and when Black Harry was born and died is unknown. Most sources indicate that he was born in the south of the United States and that he also returned there after his forced departure from Sint Eustatius. He was on Sint Eustatius from about 1780 to 1788. There is also no consensus among the sources as to whether Black Harry was enslaved or a free man during his time on Sint Eustatius. He preached Methodism among the black population of the island, a belief that was spread in the Caribbean by missions of founders John Wesley and Thomas Coke during that period. He soon had many followers. Soon he was banned from preaching by the Reformed government, partly because he aroused revivals among his followers, which sometimes meant that they could not work for days. Governor Johannes Runnels cracked down on Methodism and Black Harry, who disregarded the ban on preaching, was brutally flogged several times as punishment. Other followers of Methodism were also severely punished for attending meetings. Eventually, Black Harry was banned from the island after which he is said to have returned to the southern United States.

== Congregation of Methodists ==
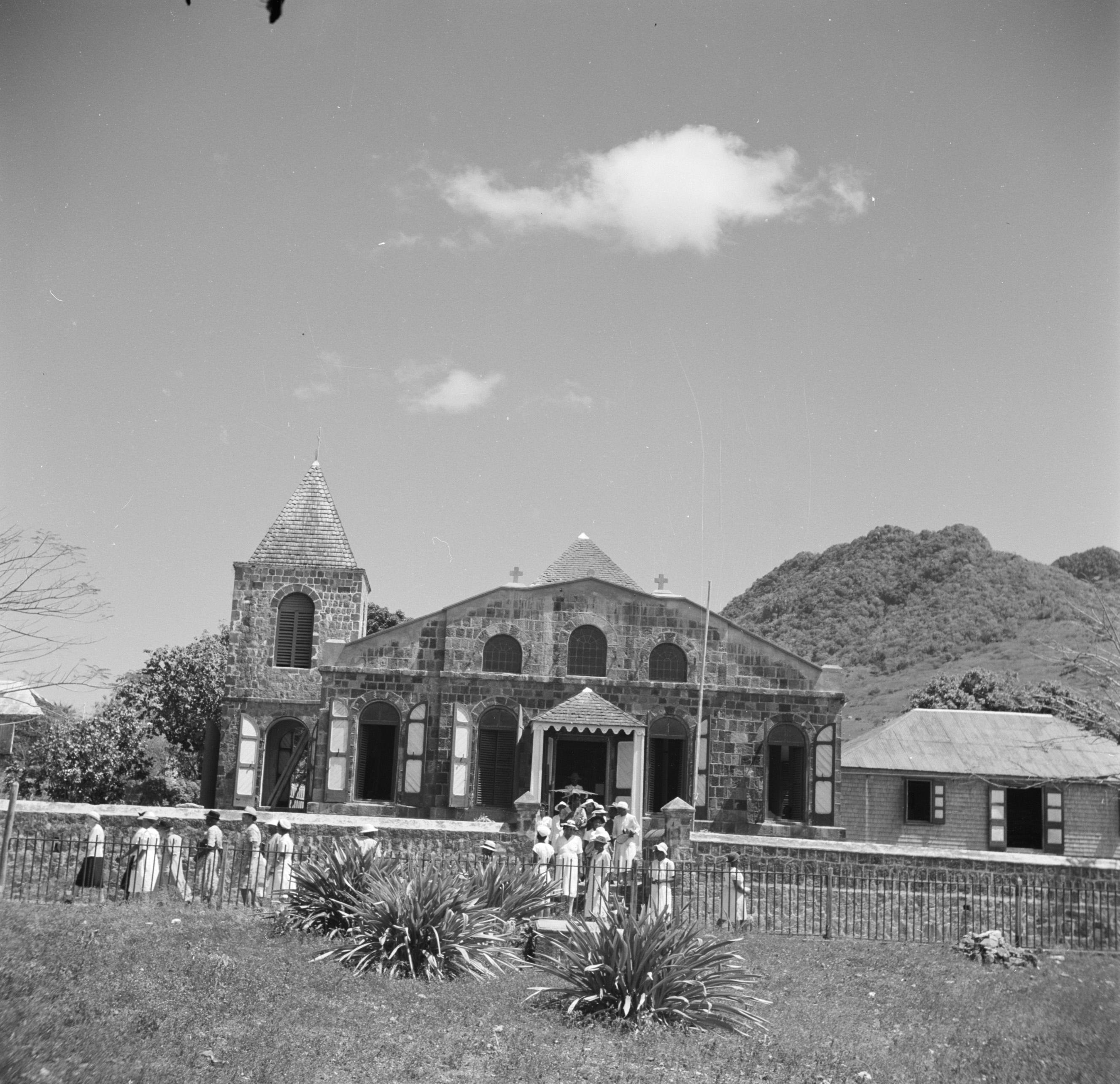
The Methodist Church in Oranjestad in Sint Eustatius

In 1811, a wooden church was built at the current Black Harry Lane on Sint Eustatius (formerly Kapelweg) and the Methodist congregation continued to grow. In 1846, a stone church building, Bethel Methodist Church, was built on the site of the wooden church. This church is still standing and was given monument status in 2016.

== Appreciation ==
Black Harry is an important part of the intangible heritage of Sint Eustatius. A street has been named after him and the story of Black Harry is still regularly brought to life during school plays. Legend has it that Black Harry cast a curse on the island when he was forced to leave.
