= Thomas' Methodist Episcopal Chapel =

Historic church in Delaware, United States

- U.S. National Register of Historic Places
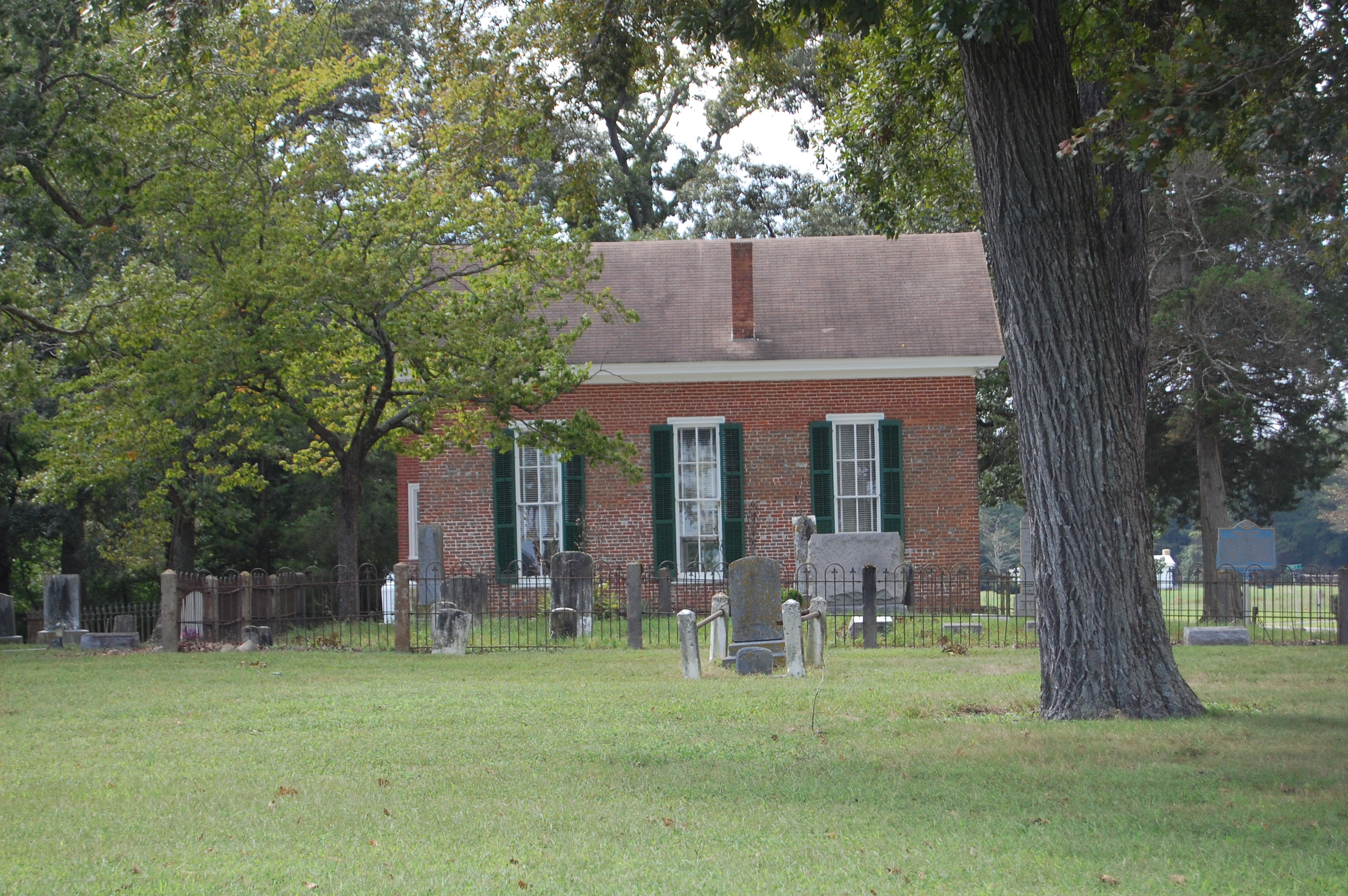

- Location within Delaware Location within the United States
- Location: Road 206 west of Chapeltown, West Dover Hundred, near Chapeltown, Delaware
- Coordinates: 39°5′55″N 75°42′15″W
- Area: 2 acres (0.81 ha)
- Built: 1825, 1877
- Architectural style: Greek Revival
- NRHP reference No.: 93001516
- Added to NRHP: January 26, 1994

Thomas' Methodist Episcopal Chapel, also known as Thomas Chapel, is a historic Methodist chapel and cemetery located near Chapeltown in Kent County, Delaware. The site was the location of the freedman Harry Hosier's 1784 sermon, the first to be delivered by an African American man directly to a white congregation.

The present structure was originally built in 1825 and remodeled in 1877. It is a small one-story, three-bay by three-bay, gable-roofed, brick building in the Greek Revival style. Also on the property are a contributing privy and combination storage shed and refreshment stand, both built about 1900.

Adjacent to the church is the cemetery, used since the late-18th century.

It was added to the National Register of Historic Places in 1994.

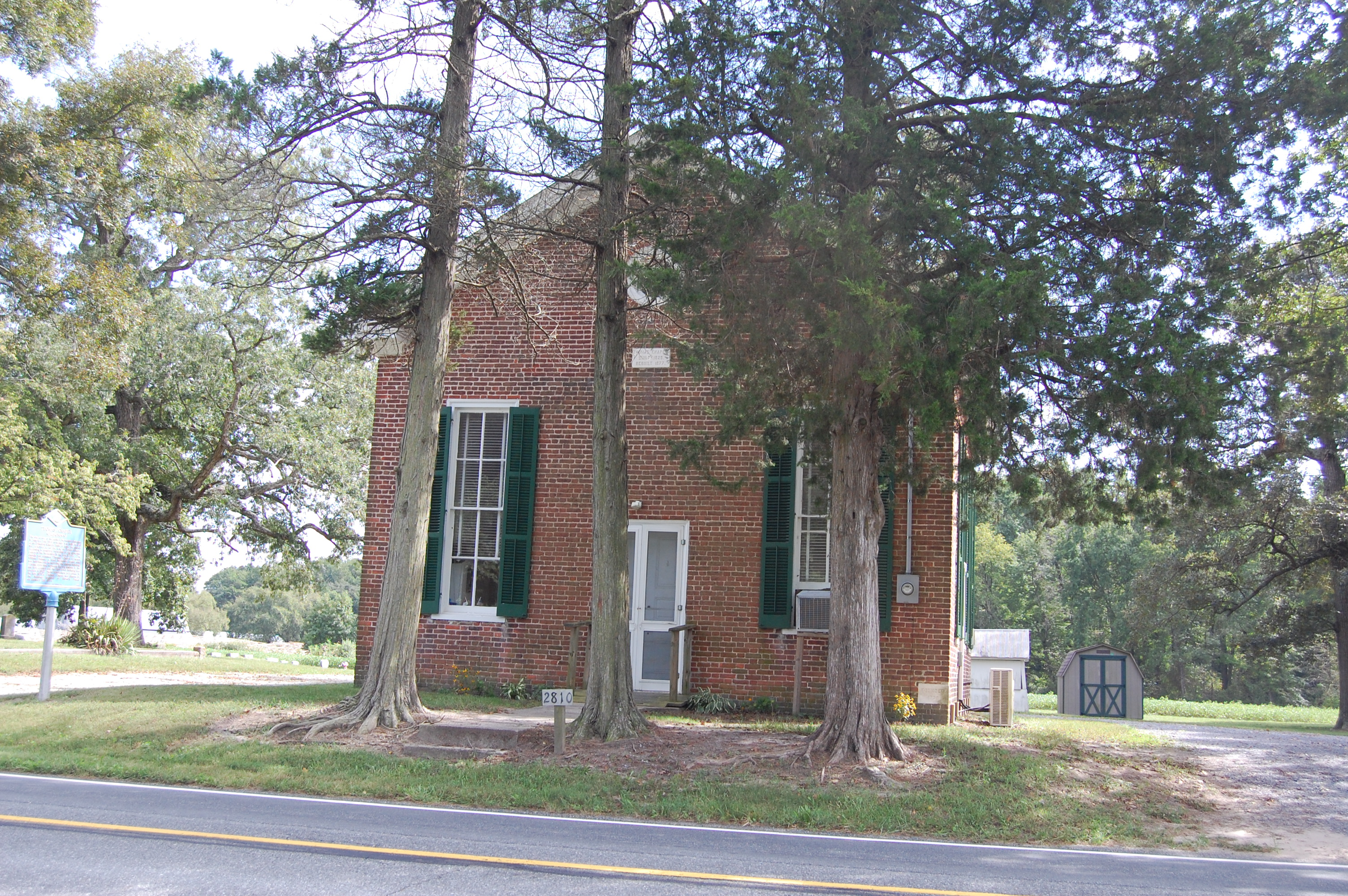

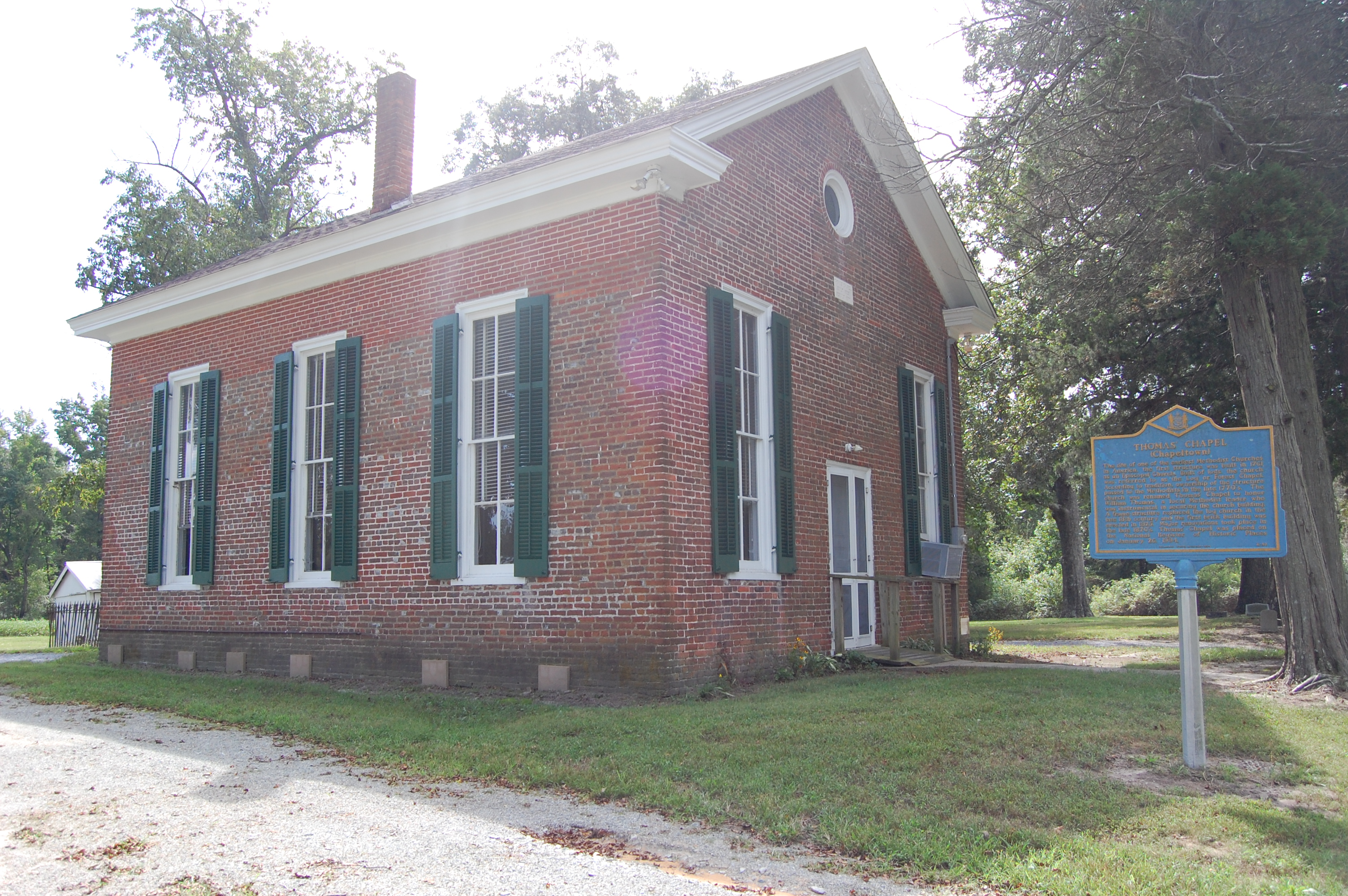

== See also ==
- Black Harry
- List of Methodist churches in the United States
