= Munson's Hill =

Geographic eminence located in Virginia

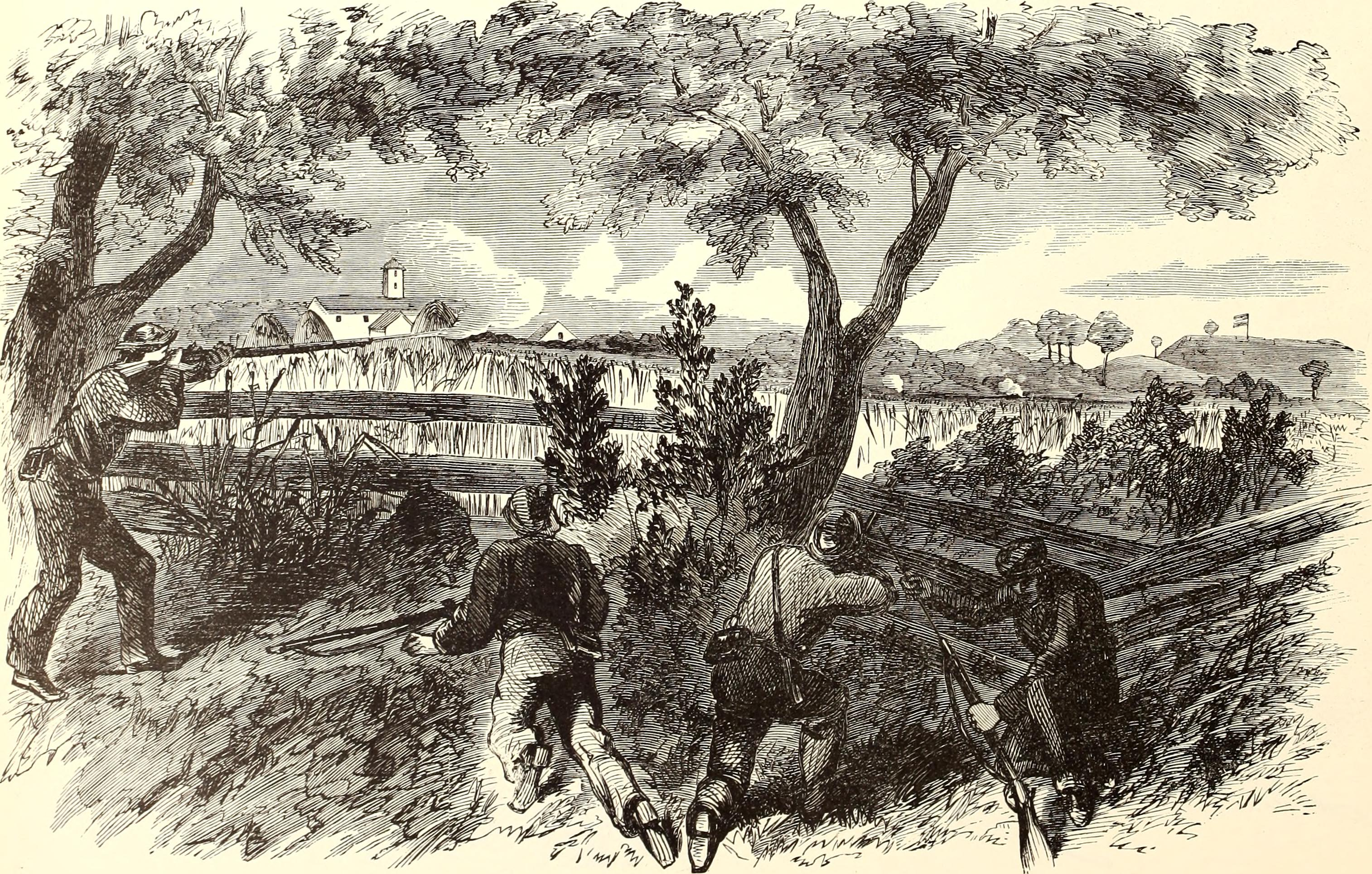
Skirmishing between the pickets of the two armies near Munson’s Hill, the hill in the distance

Munson's Hill is a geographic eminence located in eastern Fairfax County, Virginia. Its summit rises to 367 feet (112 m) above sea level.

== Location and name ==
Munson's Hill is located at 38.85983°N 77.14554°W.

The hill is adjacent to Upton's Hill (410 ft) on its north. It is located at an area called Seven Corners, where Leesburg Pike, U.S. Route 50, Sleepy Hollow Road, and Wilson Boulevard intersect. Until recent decades the area of heights where the roads intersect was called Perkins' Hill and was considered a geographically distinct hill by local residents. Geographers, however, appear to consider the two as one.

The junction of the Potomac River with the Anacostia River occurs in a natural depression. The lower portion of Washington, D.C., and its Monumental Core thus are located in a naturally occurring "bowl" circled by hills and bluffs on every side. Munson's Hill is a part of this encircling chain, along with Mason's Hill to its immediate southeast and Upton's and Minor's hills to its northwest.

Munson's Hill takes its name from Daniel O. Munson, who moved to a 180-acre (0.73 km^{2}) farm on the hill in 1851 and opened an extensive nursery, later called Munson Hill Nurseries, which operated into the mid-1900s. Munson was joined on his farm by his father, Timothy Bishop Munson, and they built a fine home on the south side of the Leesburg Pike, at the crook where it curves around the summit of Munson's Hill. The home was demolished 100 years later, in 1962, to make way for a large apartment building, Munson Hill Apartments (now Towers), which still stands on the site at 6129 Leesburg Pike.

In 1955 the summit of Munson's Hill was bulldozed and flattened to create more land on which to build single-family homes. The hill as it appears today is somewhat shorter than before.

Munson's Hill overlooks the broad, flat plain that is Bailey's Crossroads. During the Civil War Confederate Army officers and Southern journalists visited frequently and never failed to remark upon the view, which included much of Washington, D.C., and Northern Virginia. One war correspondent of the Charleston Mercury newspaper visited in September 1861 and offered the following description:

Standing on the crest of the hill, the panorama unrolled before you, is one of exquisite beauty. The river sweeps around the base of the hills beyond, hidden from view, but easily traced by the blue line of mist which marks its course. Beyond the unseen boundary of our contending countries an infinite plain stretches south to the horizon, relieved here and there by a solitary farmstead nestled down in the deep foliage. Right in front of you, and only four miles and a half away, in an air line, the great steeple of Alexandria, banner-crowned, stands up against the clear sky. The town itself is obscured by an intervening strip of woodland; but the works on Seminary Hill, which command the approach, can be seen with the naked eye. To the left of these fortifications, the dome of the Capitol lifts its ponderous head from the white shoulders of the city, which slope away on either side...

== History ==
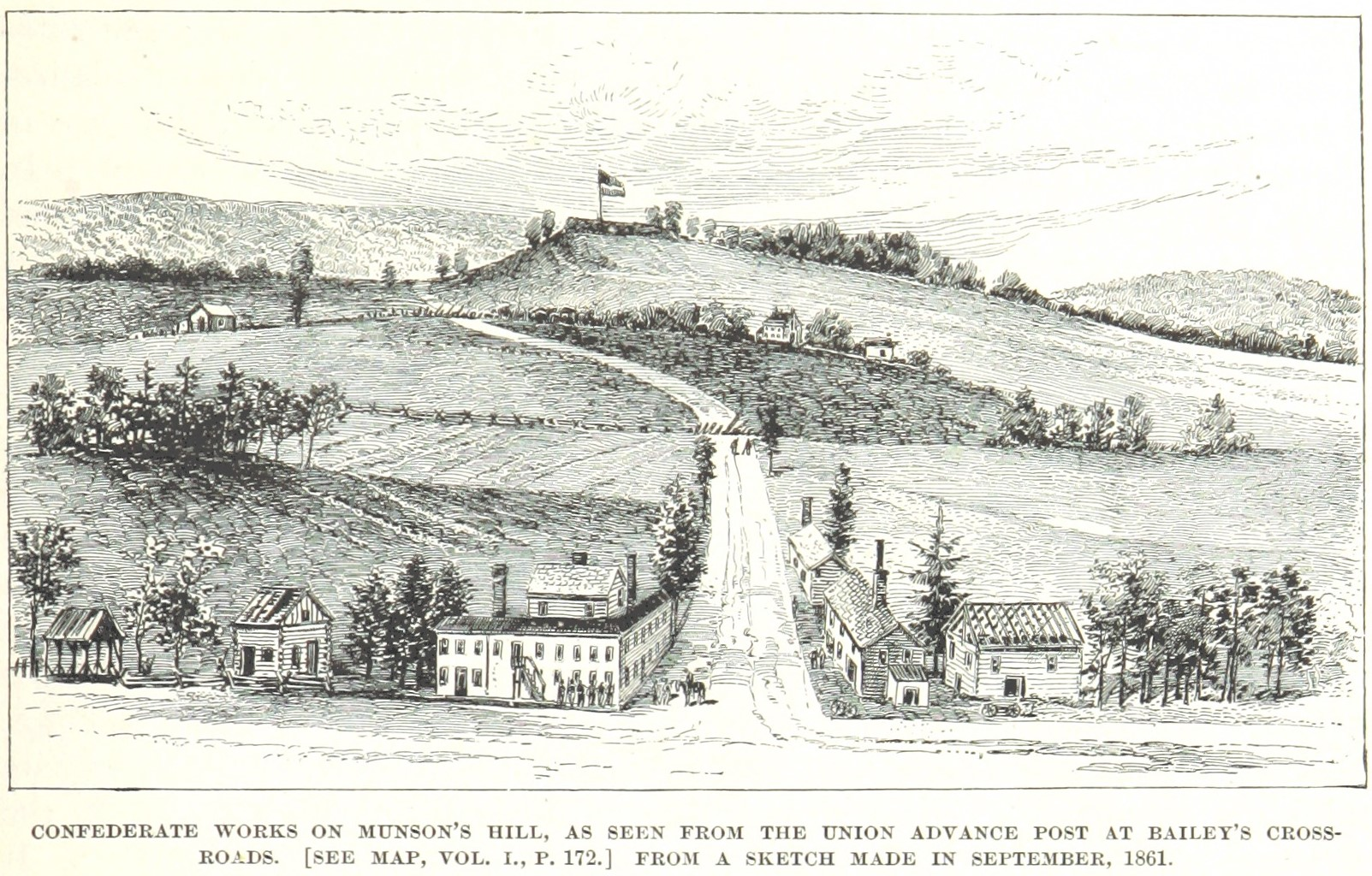
Confederate positions on the hill in September 1861

The hill was famous during the American Civil War, when it made international news headlines repeatedly. After the war opened in South Carolina, events quickly moved to Northern Virginia. A calamitous loss suffered at the First Battle of Manassas by the Union Army in July 1861 caused it to withdraw almost completely from Northern Virginia. Confederate Army troops quickly occupied Munson's, Upton's and Mason's hills, from which they had commanding views of the plain of Bailey's Crossroads and all the way into the federal capital.

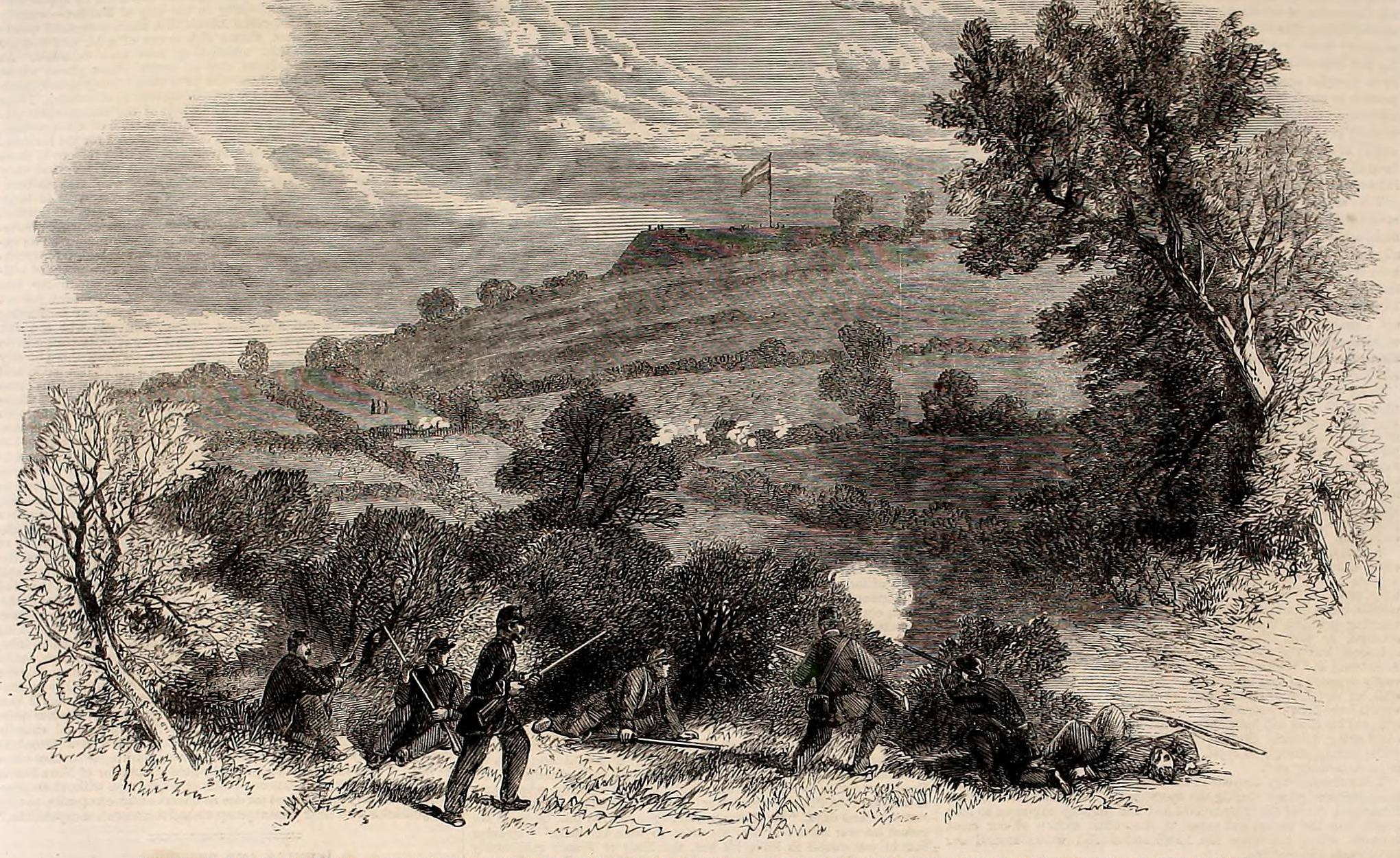
Munson's Hill, with the Earthwork thrown up by the Confederates in front of the Union Lines

More to the point, Washingtonians could also see a massive Confederate flag fluttering in the breeze from high atop the hill.

A stalemate then ensued, as Washington and its residents grew increasingly concerned that the Confederacy would launch an attack from Falls Church and its hills via the river bridges. Observers at the U.S. Capitol, using "looking glasses" (telescopes), could see fearsome-looking Confederate cannon mounted in emplacements all across Munson's Hill. The village of Falls Church, just 1.4 miles (2.3 km) away, hosted the local Confederate headquarters.

The area became a deathtrap during this time as Confederate sharpshooters, with their commanding view of Bailey's Crossroads, shot and killed as many Union army soldiers as they could. During one particularly intense firefight very close to the Munson home, Daniel Munson mounted his horse and attempted to flee toward Union army lines. As he exited his gate onto the Leesburg Turnpike, Confederate sharpshooters shot his horse out from under him. He got up and ran across the fields towards Bailey's Crossroads and escaped capture, eventually making it to the protection of Union lines.

This all changed during the night of September 28, 1861. The Confederate Army silently withdrew from Falls Church and Munson's, Mason's and Upton's hills, and retreated to Centreville, which they fortified. The Union Army, to its extreme embarrassment, discovered the fearsome-looking cannon to be "Quaker guns" – logs painted black. The army was the subject of ridicule throughout the North, where confounded citizens pondered how their army was kept at bay for two months with nothing more than what Mother Nature grew in her own foundry!

Songs were written by Northern lyricists lampooning their army. "The Bold Engineer", "Munson's Hill!", and "The Battle of the Stove-Pipes" all poke caustic fun at Northern generals. One song called Munson's Hill a "mountain of sand".

Life during this time was hard for the Munsons, particularly the elderly Timothy B. Munson, who as a native New Yorker felt it necessary to seek refuge in Washington. After the Southern army withdrew from the area he suffered numerous deprivations while under the military rule of the Union Army—-and, ironically, the worst were meted out by the poorly disciplined soldiers of the 37th New York Infantry, from Munson's home state. In a letter to a Washington newspaper Munson cataloged all the deprivations and offenses and closed with the plea, "My God! How long must these things continue? We may well exclaim, Save us from our friends!!!"

Numerous lithographs of Munson's Hill were published in the American and British press during the early months of the Civil War. Several depict Daniel Munson's three-story barn, and one depicts his home. These have been reprinted in full in a local history of the Civil War entitled A Virginia Village Goes to War--Falls Church During the Civil War.

== Modern era ==
The Munson's Hill Nurseries recovered after the Civil War and supplied much of Northern Virginia with its domesticated greenery. In Falls Church Broad Street and Washington Street were lined with silver maples planted by Daniel Munson in 1889. Those lining West Broad Street were cut in 1948–49, and those along East Broad Street met their doom in 1958, all due to street widening.

The legacy of the Munson trees—which formed a beautiful leafy bower—continues to be something Falls Church seeks to emulate today, through successful street-tree planting programs.

Munson's Hill was fully developed in the 1950s and early 1960s. Much of it is covered by the commercial and shopping area called Seven Corners, consisting of many large stores and shopping centers lining either side of Leesburg Pike. The hill's slopes and former summit are occupied by single-family housing. It is today an important commercial area.
