= Henry Evans (preacher) =

American preacher (c. 1760–1810)

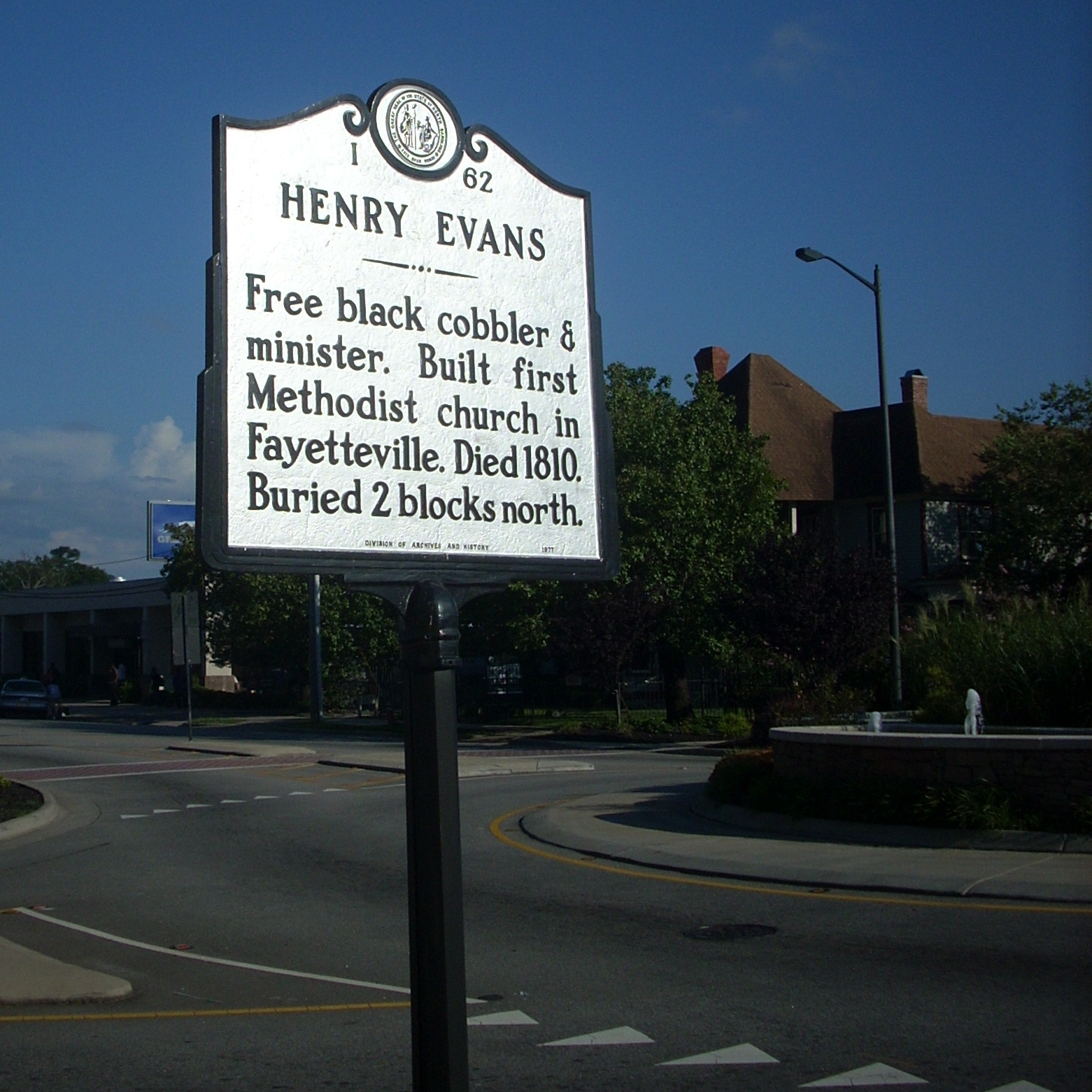
- Historic marker dedicated to Evans by the North Carolina Highway Historical Marker Program
- Born: c. 1760; Colony of Virginia, British America
- Died: September 17, 1810 (aged 49–50); Fayetteville, North Carolina, U.S.
- Occupations: cobbler, preacher

Henry Evans (c. 1760 – September 17, 1810) was an American free Black cobbler and Methodist preacher who lectured to enslaved Black people and built the first Methodist church in Fayetteville, North Carolina. He is considered to be the "father of Methodism" in the city as he brought the Methodist church to the area in the pre-Civil War era.

== Biography ==
=== Early life ===
Little is known about the life of Evans. Accounts of his life were detailed through the autobiographies of Methodist Episcopal bishop William Capers and Reverend James Jenkins during their visit to Fayetteville.

Henry Evans was born to free Black parents in 1760 in Virginia. He converted to Christianity and Methodism and was licensed to preach in that state at an early age. He was removed from Virginia and relocated to Doubs Chapel in what is now Forsyth County. He worked as a shoemaker there for about a year but decided to move to Charleston, South Carolina, to improve financially. While on his way there, he was detained in Fayetteville for a few days. During his time in jail, he noticed the lack of religious worship among his fellow Black people. Because of this, he stayed in Fayetteville and decided to become a preacher.

=== Career in preaching ===
Evans began to preach to his fellow Black people, but the town council prohibited his ability to preach. As a result, he moved out of town and went to the woods and continued to preach. He moved from place to place to escape mob violence by the local citizens, who took matters into their own hands after the council deemed that no law was violated. He persuaded others that his intentions were pure and "begged to be subjected to scrutiny of any surveillance" so that he could be allowed to preach.

Soon, people suspected Evans of preaching to their Black servants because they were behaving better than before, changing the opinions of the townspeople and allowing him to preach in town. Later, White people also joined to listen to his preachings and subsequently helped build a meeting house sometime before 1800. The meeting house was soon expanded with sheds to accommodate the increasing congregants of both races. The chapel was chartered as Evans Chapel in 1801.

Capers claimed that Evans never spoke to a White man with his hat down and never sat in their homes. He also wore clothes that were appropriate for Black people at that time. Lyerly, in her analysis of the experience of Black people in the Methodist church, stated that Evans's actions can be seen as acceptance of the racial hierarchy or as examples of what a Black leader had to do to survive in the South.

=== Death and legacy ===
Evans died on September 17, 1810 and was buried under the chancel of the meeting house. The Evans Metropolitan AME Zion Church was built on the site of Evans Chapel in 1893 and was named after Evans. The North Carolina Highway Historical Marker Program built a marker in Cumberland County in 1977 dedicated to Evans, which reads:

Free black cobbler & minister. Built first Methodist church in Fayetteville. Died 1810. Buried 2 blocks north.

William Capers considered him to be the "father of the Methodist church, white and black, in Fayetteville, and the best preacher of his time in that quarter", likening him to a "Boanerges", a surname given by Jesus to James and John due to their temper. Lyerly claimed that Capers was torn between his respect for Evans and his racism, due to his contradictory portrayal of Evans's personality as humble as well as challenging racial norms. Lyerly also acknowledged Evans's efforts to keep the meeting house open despite racist threats and prohibition, saying that he was not a tool for White authority.

== See also ==
- John Chavis
- Thomas Day (cabinetmaker)
- Joseph Willis (minister)
