= Anglican Frontier Missions =

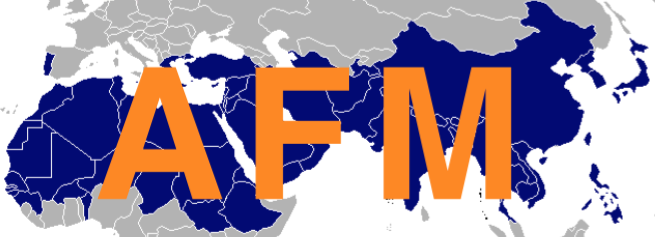
- Formation: November 1, 1993
- Founder: The Rev. Tad de Bordenave
- Type: Missionary agency
- Headquarters: Richmond, VA
- Location: United States
- Official language: English
- Executive director: The Rev. Christopher Royer
- Website: anglicanfrontiers.com

Anglican Frontier Missions is an American-based Christian mission organization that "To plant biblically-based, indigenous churches where the church is not, among the 2 billion people and 6,000+ unreached people groups still waiting to hear the Gospel for the very first time."

== History ==
Anglican Frontier Missions (AFM) originated at a meeting of 23 leaders of the Episcopal Church on November 1, 1990 (All Saints' Day), coinciding with the first year of the "Decade of Evangelism" of the Anglican Communion. Their decision to form a missionary society came to fruition three years later.

Founded by the Rev. E. A. de Bordenave in 1993, one thing notable about AFM is that it uses a non-denominational approach to missions, recruiting from any denomination or Christian faith tradition in order to reach the 29% of the world's population who have not heard the Christian message. This approach was new within Anglicanism.

In 2007 Dr. Julian Linnell was appointed second executive director of AFM. English by birth, Dr. Linnell focused his efforts on mobilizing churches, mentoring individuals and sending missionaries to ethnic groups in a region stretching from North Africa, through the Middle East to Southeast Asia. Prior to AFM, he served as a cross-cultural missionary in Southeast Asia.

The Rev. Christopher Royer was named third executive director of AFM in June 2014. Prior to his call to Anglican Frontier Missions, Rev. Royer developed a contagious passion for the unreached and a sensitivity to cross-cultural evangelism while serving and planting churches among Muslims in the Middle East.

== Methods ==

Anglican Frontier Missions partners with members of the Anglican Communion from around the world to serve as a catalyst to provinces, dioceses, churches, and individuals so that the Gospel extends to all. There are approximately 104 million Anglicans in the world. Anglican Frontier Missions also works with other organizations, denominations, and Christian groups who share its biblical values and strategic vision to see the Good News rooted in hearts and minds of peoples who have limited, or no, access to the Gospel.

Anglican Frontier Missions sends missionaries to the largest and least-evangelized people groups in the world. Anglican Frontier Missions accepts missionaries from any Bible-believing denominational background.
