= Chapeltown, Delaware =

Unincorporated community in Delaware, United States

- Unincorporated community
- Location within Delaware Location within the United States
- Coordinates: 39°05′59″N 75°41′49″W
- Country: United States
- State: Delaware
- County: Kent
- Elevation: 59 ft (18 m)
- Time zone: UTC-5 (Eastern (EST))
  - Summer (DST): UTC-4 (EDT)
- Area code: 302
- GNIS feature ID: 216059

Chapeltown is an unincorporated community in Kent County, Delaware, United States. Chapeltown is located on Westville Road, 10 miles (16 km) west-southwest of Dover. Thomas' Methodist Episcopal Chapel, which is listed on the National Register of Historic Places, is located in Chapeltown.
