= Mason's Hill =

Hill in Fairfax County, Virginia

Mason’s Hill is a geographic eminence located in Fairfax County, Virginia. Its summit rises to 397 feet (121 m) above sea level.

== Location and name ==
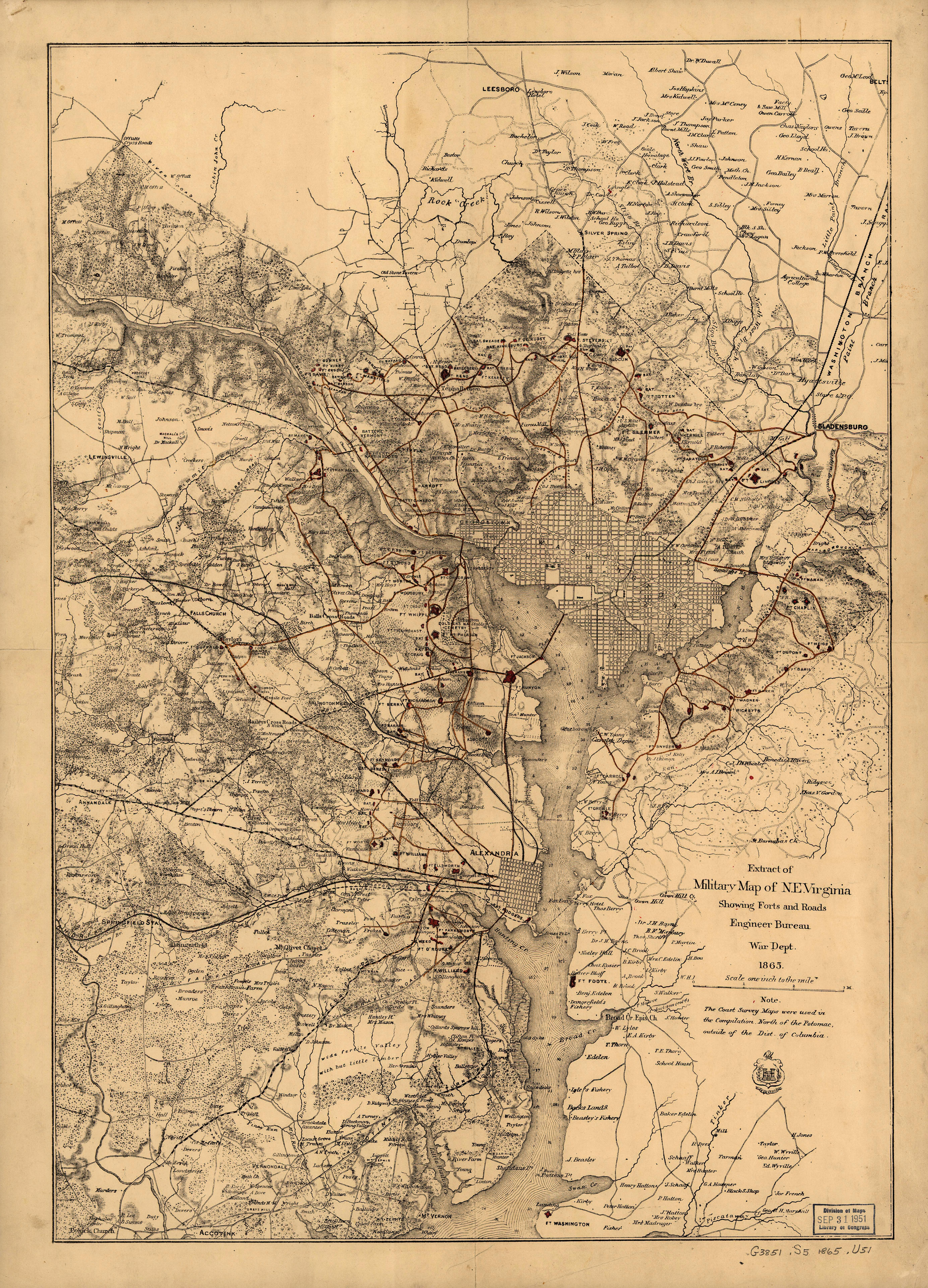
Mason's Hill appears at far left of map

Mason’s Hill is located at 38.836585°N 77.169890°W. The hill is named after Virginia's prominent Mason family, particularly grandson of George Mason and owner of the house on the hill Murray Mason, a former US Navy captain who took a commission in the Confederate Navy, as well as his older brother James Murray Mason, a former US Senator from Virginia who later became the Confederate envoy to Great Britain.

The hill is also near Munson’s Hill, 2 miles (3.2 km) to its northeast. It is located in Annandale, Virginia, along Columbia Pike and just to the north of Little River Turnpike.

== History ==
According to state and county historic markers, the location was used early in the American Civil War by Confederate Col. J.E.B. Stuart and his 1st Virginia Cavalry following the First Battle of Manassas; Col. Edward Porter Alexander built a signal observation tower with a six-foot "astronomical glass" to observe Washington, D.C. until Confederate forces withdrew to Centreville in September 1861.

As noted elsewhere on Wikipedia, on Sunday, August 25, 1861, there was a little known skirmish here between the Union (American Civil War) and the Confederate States of America.

== The modern era ==
The area now contains a mix of private residences, a school, a church, and the Fairfax County, Virginia Mason District Government Center as well as the Fairfax County Park Authority Mason District Park. State historic marker T-50 is located at 38.837852°N 77.163515°W adjacent to the Government Center, and the county historic marker is located within Mason District Park at 38.835316°N 77.173115°W.
