= John Chavis =

American Presbyterian minister and revolutionary (1763–1838)

- Born: 1763
- Died: 1838
- Occupation: Preacher

John Chavis (c. 1763–June 15, 1838) was a free Black educator and Presbyterian minister in the American South during the early 19th century. Born in Oxford, North Carolina, he was the first African American known to attend college in the U.S. and he fought for the Continental Army during the American Revolutionary War. Chavis studied with John Witherspoon at the College of New Jersey (presently Princeton University) and finished his studies at Liberty Hall Academy (presently Washington and Lee University) in Virginia, where he was licensed to preach. Later, while working in Raleigh, North Carolina, he established a private school that was highly regarded and attended by both White and Black students (although on differing schedules).

== Early life ==
The exact date of Chavis' birth is not known. It is believed that he was born in either 1762 or 1763 in Virginia. One source claims he was born on October 18, 1763, but with no evidence given.

Information about Chavis's early life is scant as well, with few records to document it. It is believed that he may have been the 'John Chavis' who was employed as an indentured servant by a Halifax, Virginia lawyer named James Milner. A 1773 inventory of Milner's estate does list an "indentured servant named John Chavis." Since Milner possessed a large library, it is possible that Chavis received some schooling during his period of service.

== Military service ==
Chavis served as a soldier during the American Revolutionary War. He enlisted in December 1778 and served in the 5th Virginia Regiment for three years. Captain Mayo Carrington of the regiment wrote in a bounty warrant dated March 1783 that Chavis had "faithfully fulfilled [his duties] and is thereby entitled to all immunities granted to three year soldiers."

A 1789 tax list of Mecklenburg County, Virginia, shows that he was listed as a free Black man owning one horse. He had married a woman named Sarah Frances Anderson, and they had one son, Anderson Chavis. In 1789, he was employed by Robert Greenwood's estate as tutor to Greenwood's orphans.

== Education ==
In the 1790s, Chavis lived in Princeton, New Jersey, where he took private classes under John Witherspoon to prepare for entering the Presbyterian ministry. Based on recorded minutes of the meeting of the trustees of the College of New Jersey (later to become Princeton University) dated September 26, 1792, Reverend John Blair recommended that "Mr. Todd Henry, a Virginian, and John Chavis, a free Black man of that state, ... be received" on the school's Leslie Fund. After Witherspoon's death in 1794, Chavis transferred to Liberty Hall Academy in Virginia. The following year, George Washington donated 100 shares of James River Company Stock to the school, after which the school's name was changed to Washington Academy (now Washington and Lee University) to commemorate Washington's gift.

== Ministry ==
On November 19, 1800, Chavis completed with high honors a rigorous theological examination that began on June 11, 1800, in Virginia. On this date, he was also granted a license to preach by the Presbytery of Lexington, Virginia, becoming the first African American to receive an official license to preach from the Presbyterian Church in the United States. Six months later, with high character recommendations from the Presbytery of Lexington, Chavis was transferred to work under the Hanover Presbytery.

In April 1802, Chavis had applied for freeman's papers and received them from the Rockbridge County, Virginia, Court. It was recorded that "said [John] Chavis has been known to the Court for several years ... and that he has always ... been considered as a freeman, and they believe him to be such, and that he has always while in the county conducted himself in a decent orderly and respectable manner, and also that he has been a student at Washington Accademy [sic] where they believe he whent [sic] through a regular course of accademical [sic] studies."

Between 1801 and 1807, Chavis served as a circuit-riding missionary for the General Assembly of the Presbyterian Church, preaching to enslaved and free Blacks in the states of Maryland, Virginia, and North Carolina. Some records indicate he also preached to Whites during his missionary tours.

Chavis went to Raleigh, North Carolina, sometime between 1807 and 1809, where he was licensed to preach the Christian gospel by the Orange Presbytery. Although not called by a parish, he continued to preach to Black and White congregations in Granville, Orange, and Wake counties. Some of the White congregations included slaveholders.

== Educator ==
In 1808, Chavis opened a school in his home, where he taught both White and Black children. He placed ads in the Raleigh Register to encourage enrollment. At first he taught both races together. After some White parents objected, he taught White children during the day and Black children in the evenings. He charged White students $2.50 per quarter, and Black students $1.75 per quarter. As an educator, Chavis taught full time and instructed his college-bound White students in Latin and Greek, which were required classical subjects in the colleges and universities of that time.

His school was described as one of the best in the state. Students from some of the most prominent White families in the South studied at Chavis' school. His students included Priestly H. Mangum, brother of Senator Willie P. Mangum; Archibald E. Henderson and John L. Henderson, sons of Chief Justice Leonard Henderson; Governor Charles Manly; The Reverend William Harris; Dr. James L. Wortham; the Edwardses, Enlows (Enloes), Hargroves, and Horners; and Abraham Rencher, Governor of New Mexico Territory.

== Personal life ==
Chavis maintained a long friendship with one of his white students, Willie P. Mangum, who was elected as a US Senator from North Carolina. For many years, they conducted a correspondence where Chavis often criticized the senator's political positions. Chavis reportedly privately supported the abolition of slavery, greatly disliked President Andrew Jackson, and opposed Mangum's advocacy of states' rights. Chavis did not publicly support abolition, and publicly condemned Nat Turner's slave rebellion, positions he likely took out of concern for his own safety and to maintain his status as a freeman and position as an educator as southerners expelled free Blacks and violently suppressed Turner's rebellion.

John Chavis's Letter Upon the Doctrine of the Extent of the Atonement of Christ was found by Helen Chavis Othow, who published his biography, John Chavis: African American Patriot, Preacher, Teacher, and Mentor 1763–1838 (McFarland Publishers, 2001). She found the letter in the library of the University of North Carolina at Chapel Hill. A copy of Chavis's sermon is included in the study with an Introduction by Dr. Othow. Rev. Chavis had appealed to the Orange Presbytery to assist with the publication of his sermon, but they refused, stating that it was a subject that had been adequately discussed and would be of no interest to the public. He went ahead and published his sermon in 1837 through J. Gales and Son in Raleigh.

After Turner's 1831 rebellion resulted in the murder of dozens of White men, women and children, slave-holding states quickly passed laws that forbade all Blacks to preach. Although Chavis was forced to give up preaching and teaching school, the presbytery continued to pay Chavis $50 a year until his death to support him and his wife. Before his death, Rev. Chavis left the Orange Presbytery and joined the Roanoke Presbytery. The presbytery voted to provide payments of $40 a year to his widow after his death until 1842. At that time, Chavis's widow told the presbytery that her family could take care of her and her children.

=== Death ===
Chavis died in June 1838 in circumstances that remain unclear. According to his biographer, Helen Chavis Othow, the oral tradition suggests that Chavis was killed by Whites who did not want him educating Blacks. Local legend says that Chavis was beaten to death in his home. In 1986 Othow founded the John Chavis Historical Society. One of its goals was to locate Chavis' gravesite.

Dr. George Clayton Shaw wrote the first biography about Chavis, published in 1931. He wrote that Chavis was buried at Walnut Hall, the plantation of Senator Willie Person Mangum, Chavis' former student. After numerous searches for the gravesite, in 1988 members of the John Chavis Historical Society found the old cemetery. The group appealed to the state archaeologist to investigate the site, but this has not occurred as of 2013. The Old Cemetery was added to the map of Hill Forest (the former Mangum plantation) by Michael Hill, historian of the North Carolina Archives.

== Legacy ==
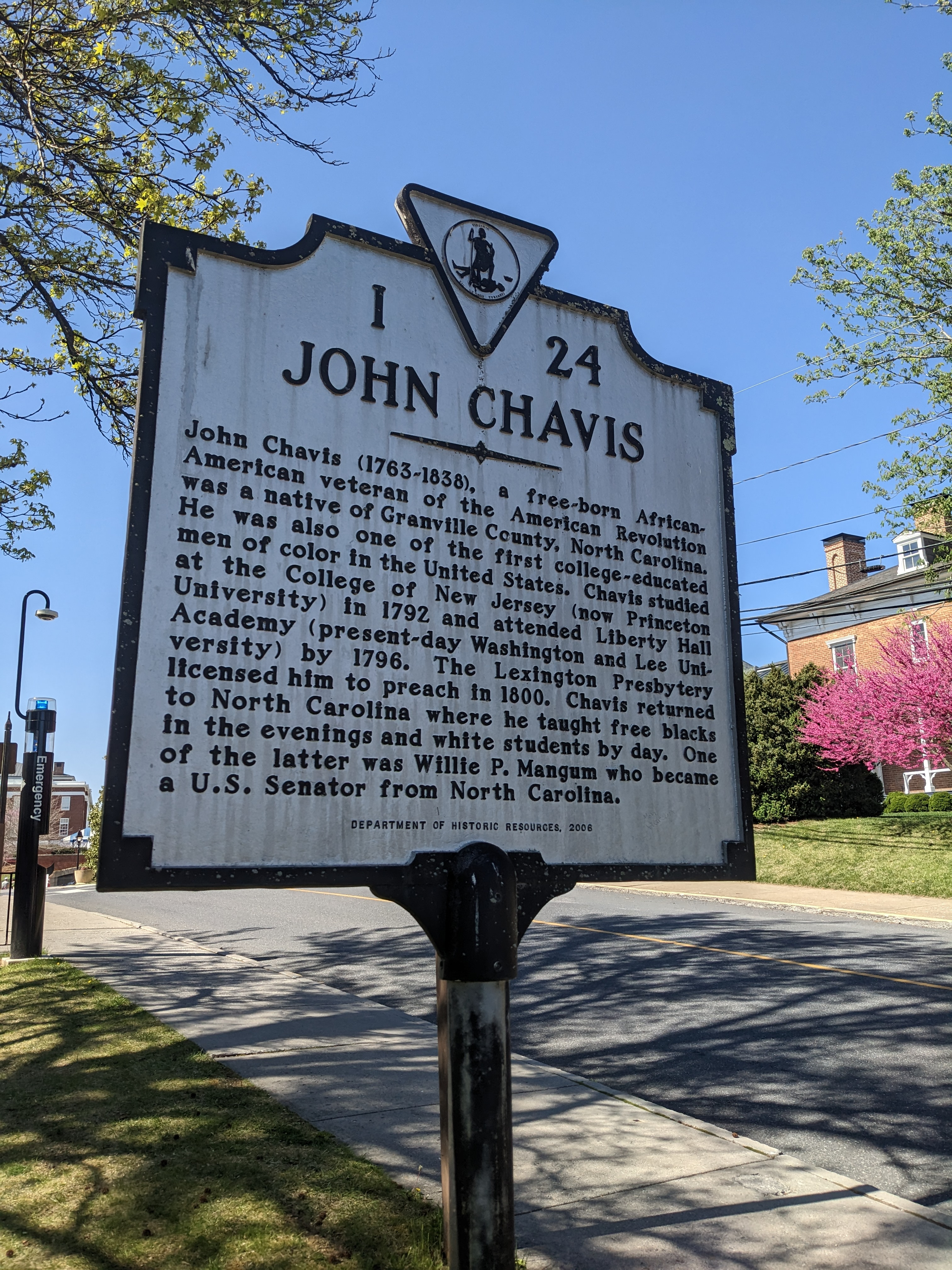
Historical marker on Washington and Lee University campus in Lexington, Virginia

Chavis is the subject of historical markers in both North Carolina and Virginia.

Chavis Heights apartments and John Chavis Memorial Park in Raleigh, North Carolina, are named after him, as are an academic building, on-campus student residence, and boardroom at Washington and Lee University. Several schools are, as well, including John Chavis Middle School in Cherryville, North Carolina.

== See also ==
- Henry Evans (preacher)
- Joseph Willis (minister)
- Thomas Day (cabinetmaker)
