= Christar =

American Christian mission society (1930-)

- Established: 1930 (95 years ago)
- Types: Christian missionary society
- Headquarters: Richardson, Reading
- Revenue: 397,397 United States dollar (2021)
- Total Assets: 580,656 United States dollar (2021)
- Website: www.christar.org

Christar is an international evangelical Christian mission organization based in Richardson, TX (formerly Reading, PA). It has over 300 members, serving among "least-reached" (unreached) people groups in over twenty countries. It was founded in 1930 as "The India Mission", being renamed "International Missions, Inc." in the early 1950s. It was renamed "Christar" in the 21st century to avoid confusion with the Southern Baptist Convention International Mission Board. It received a five-star rating from Ministry Watch.
