= Frontier missions =

Christian term

Frontier Missions is a Christian missiological term referring to the natural pioneering of the gospel among ethno-cultural and ethno-linguistic population segments where there is no indigenous church. The phrase was originally used with reference to Roman Catholic, and later Protestant, mission stations in the Western United States.

In the 1960s, missiologists began to re-employ the term to distinguish between two kinds of missionary work: that which was being done among peoples where the indigenous church was already established, and new efforts among peoples where the Christian Church was very weak or non-existent. The contemporary usage of the term is part of a general trend to look at the missionary task more in terms of social, cultural and linguistic isolation from the gospel, rather than strictly geographic isolation.

Examples of societies that focus on this sort of missionary work are Frontiers and Anglican Frontier Missions.
