= James Jenkins (Methodist) =

Methodist preacher in the southern US (1767–1847)

The Reverend James Jenkins (1764–1847) was an early Methodist circuit rider and preacher in Tennessee, Kentucky, and frontier Illinois, as well as his home state of South Carolina.

Born in Brittons Neck, South Carolina, to Elizabeth Britton Jenkins and her husband Samuel, he was a Methodist minister for fifty-five years. He first traveled the Cherokee Circuit, preaching to settlers and Indians alike. He was named presiding elder of the South Carolina district in 1801 and married Elizabeth Ann Gwyn in 1805. He died in Camden, South Carolina.
