= Minor's Hill =

Highest point in Arlington Virginia

Coordinates: 38°54′12″N 77°09′27″W

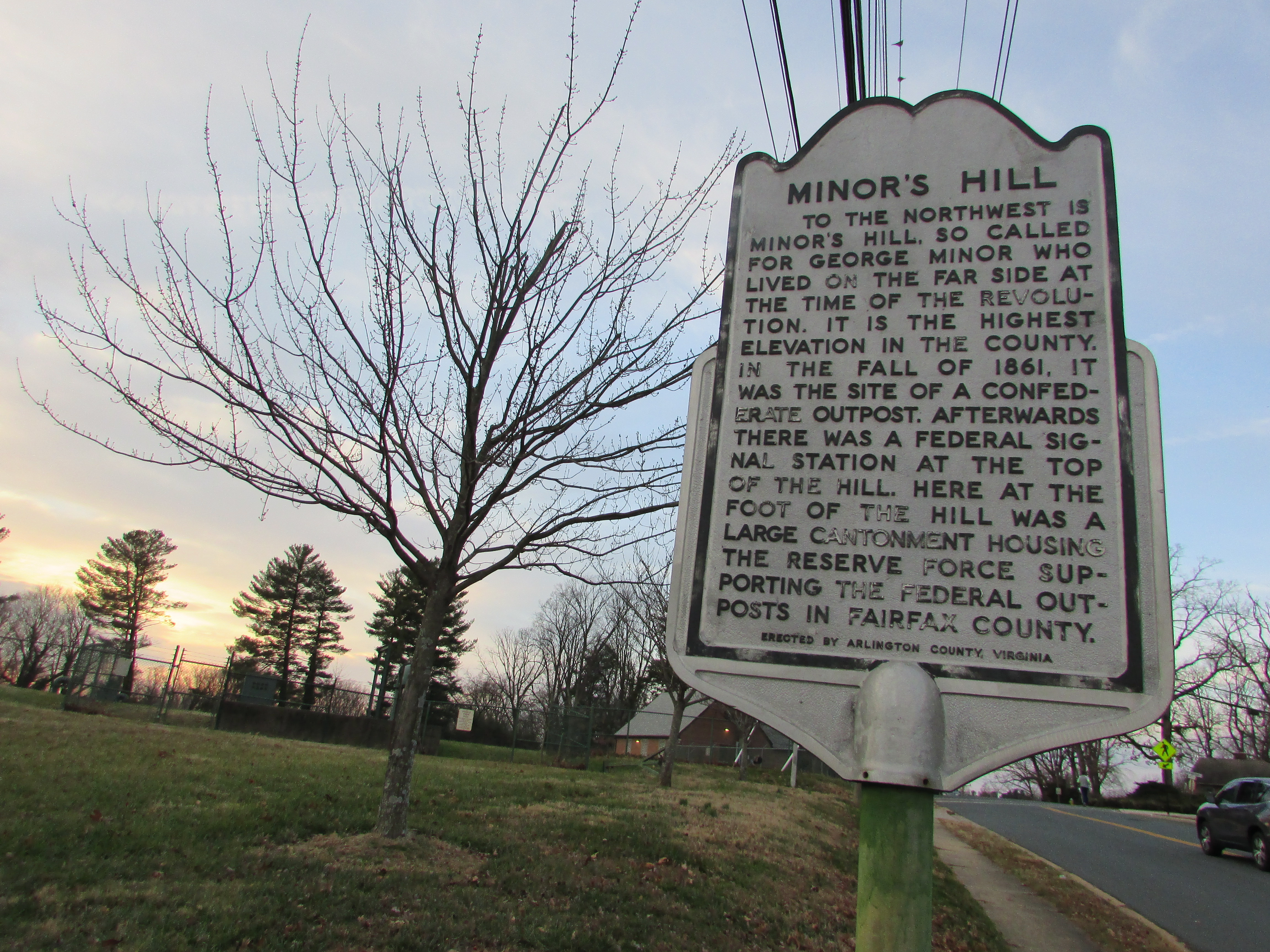
Minor's Hill's historic marker

Minor's Hill is a geographic eminence located in the western tip of Arlington County, Virginia. Its summit rises to 459 feet (139 meters) above sea level which makes it the highest point in the county. The hill is named after a man named George Minor who lived there at the time of the American Revolutionary War.

== Location ==
Minor's Hill straddles the border of Arlington County and Fairfax County, Virginia. While generally conical in shape, the hill is broad and sprawling, and its summit is relatively flat and broad. Its highest point occurs in Arlington.

A local stream called Four Mile Run defines the hill's southern and southwestern extent. Mount Daniel (472 feet) is to its west, Mackey's Hill (171 feet) is to its north, and Upton's Hill (410 feet) is to its east. Its location overlooks the City of Falls Church on the opposite side of Four Mile Run, 1.4 miles to its south.

The hill is occasionally identified as Minor Hill and Minors' Hill, and during the American Civil War often appeared in newspaper accounts and soldiers' letters as "Miner's Hill".

== History ==
=== Prehistoric and Colonial eras ===
Minor's Hill was well known to local Native Americans in Northern Virginia prior to European colonization. The Indians used an important trail linking the Little Falls of the Potomac River with what is now the city center of Falls Church, where it entered the village as Little Falls Street. The trail wound around the northern and eastern sides of Minor's Hill.

English colonists founded Falls Church in 1732, choosing as its location a place that was approximately one day's horseback ride from the Potomac River. The hill was afterward settled by the Minor family. Prior to this the hill did not have a formal name.

=== War of 1812 ===
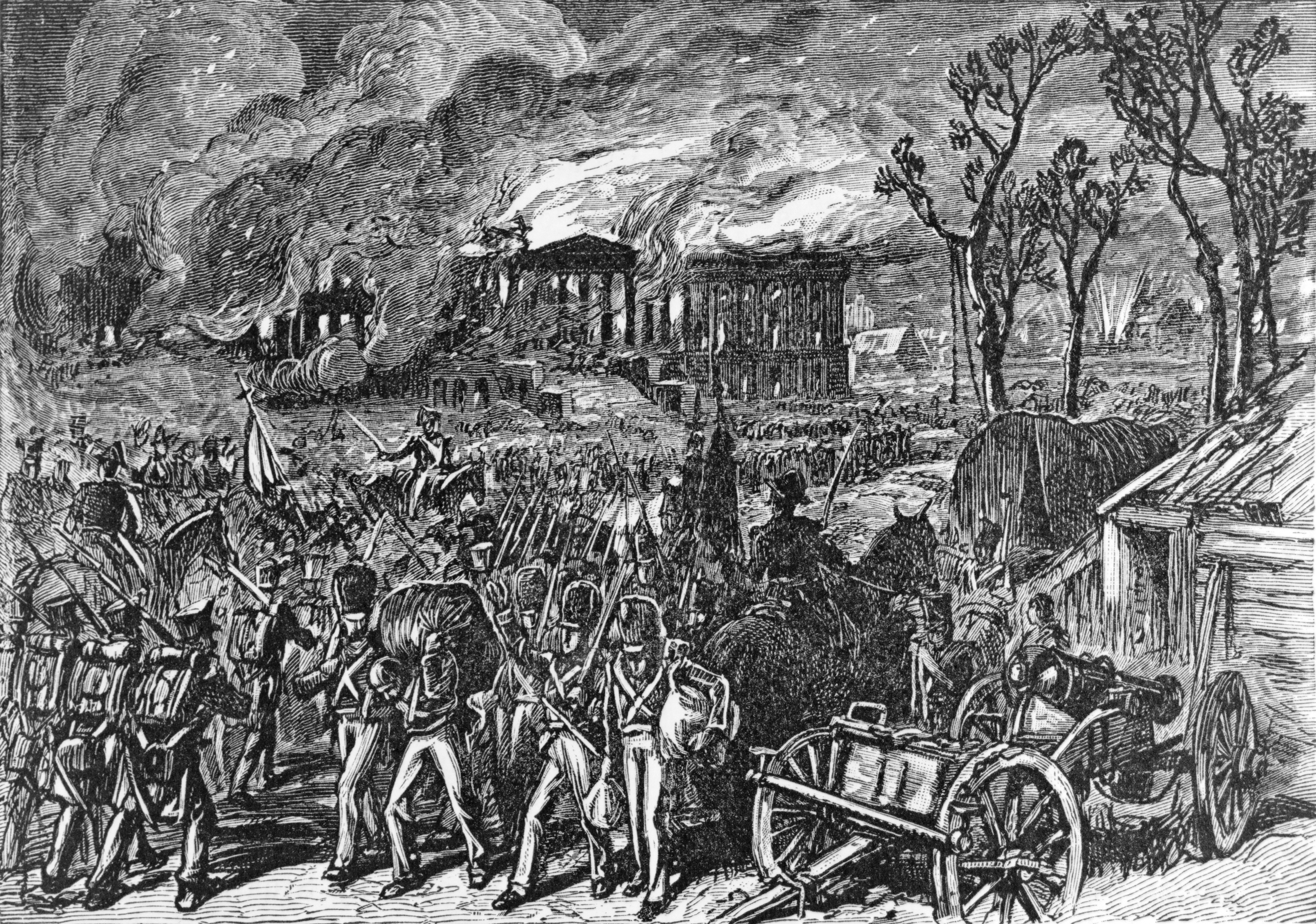
An illustration of the burning of Washington, D.C., during the War of 1812

In 1814, during the War of 1812, a British fleet ascended the Potomac River to Washington, and a British army invaded the city from the east. Colonel Minor of Minor's Hill and his 700-man Virginia Militia 60th Regiment were summoned on August 23, 1814 from Falls Church to Washington, which they were assigned to defend. However, due to bureaucratic bungling among War Department officials they were not sent to help defend the approaches to Washington at Bladensburg, Maryland nor did many of them come armed.

As events at the Battle of Bladensburg worsened, government officials began evacuating the city. At that time the Washington Navy Yard was an important fleet center, and its gunpowder was hurriedly moved across the bridges into Virginia, and brought to Falls Church for safekeeping, protected by a six-man guard dispatched by Colonel Minor.

Government officials, including President Madison and his wife Dolley, also fled the city.

British troops torched Washington, burning it to the ground. The conflagration lit the nighttime skies at Falls Church, where a young refugee from Alexandria later recalled being awakened and taken outside to see Washington burn. "At first I thought the world was on fire. Such a flame I have never seen since."

=== Civil War ===
Minor's Hill's next brush with history occurred during the American Civil War. The war was devastating for Falls Church and Minor's Hill, where Union and Confederate lines ebbed and flowed with abandon throughout the war. Each side insisted in loyalty from local residents, who found themselves living within the Confederate States of America, or the United States of America, as troops came and went and each side's military fortunes waxed and waned.

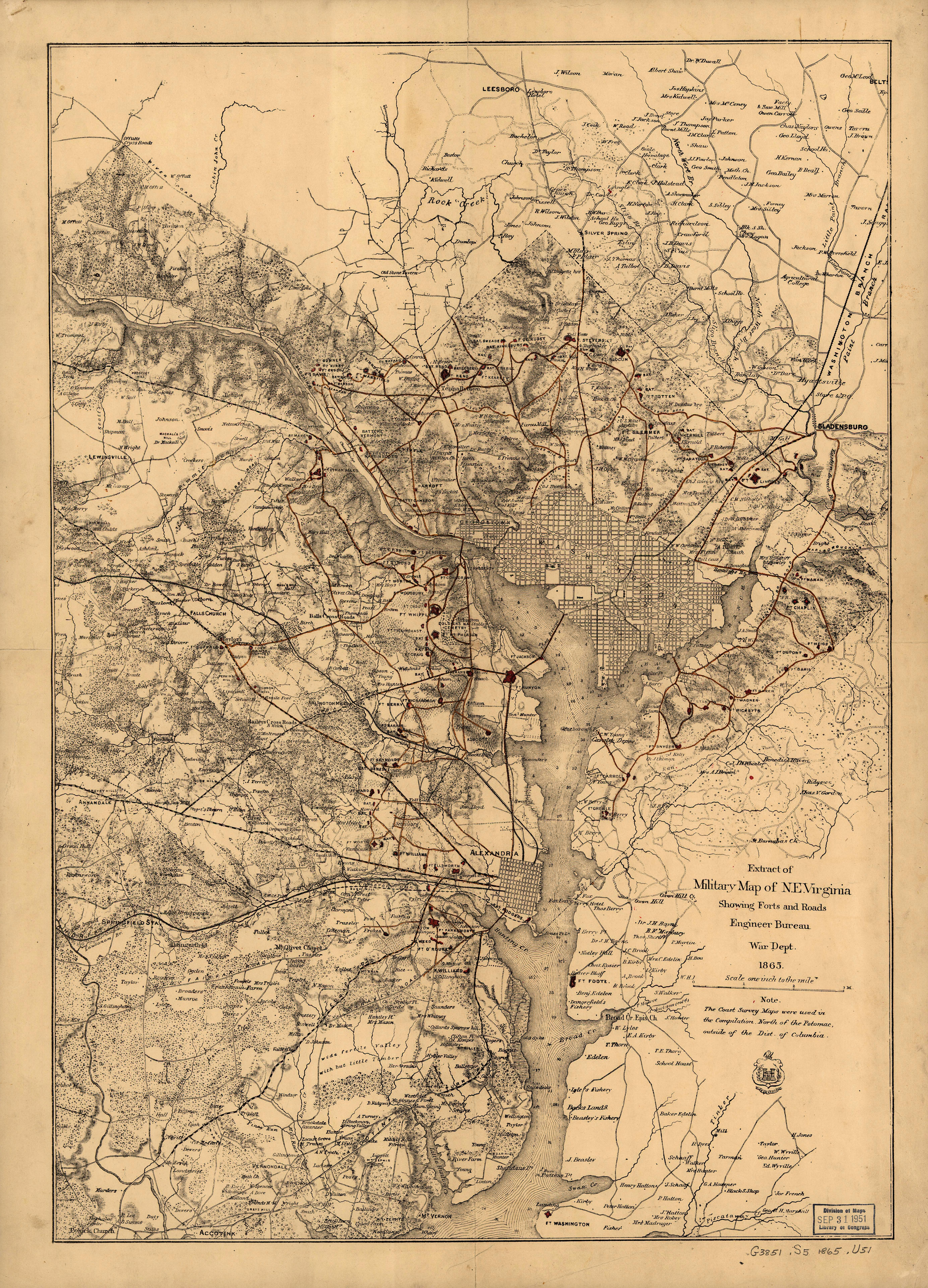
Minor's Hill appears at far left of map

The Minor family were secessionist—meaning they were pro-Confederate, and supported Virginia's bid to leave the Union, and clandestinely supported the Confederate Army and its movements throughout the war. At the beginning of the war Colonel Minor, then said to be 80, fled his home for the safety of Virginia's interior. When it was occupied by Union troops they found his War of 1812 orders, signed by Secretary of State James Monroe, directing him to the defenses of Washington at Bladensburg. It was a document "he certainly must prize," as one report put it.

Confederate raids from Falls Church went as far east as Balls' Cross Roads in present-day Ballston, and many events took place in the territory surrounding the base of the hill. But in September 1862 a second calamitous loss in battle at Manassas forced the Union Army to retrench and pull its forces toward Washington to protect the capital. Seven regiments encamped on Minor's Hill, establishing Camp Barnard, Camp Bettie Black, Camp Burnham, Camp Cameron, Camp Carl Schurz, Camp Cromwell, Camp Owen, among several smaller encampments. Each of these camps developed into veritable cities.

During the war, Union Army troops built a tall observation tower atop Minor's Hill, and also ascended from the hill in hot-air balloons to gain better views of Confederate movements in Fairfax County. Several photographs and drawings survive which depict the tower, as well as military parades and also several of the military camps. The only full-color lithograph created in the Falls Church area during the Civil War depicts Camp Owen, the camp of the 11th Rhode Island Infantry Regiment. It shows approximately 100 tents, in ten neat lines of ten tents each, as well as regimental headquarters tents. Of particular interest: a line of wooden huts may be seen—the same huts described in letters written by the soldiers who constructed them. The wood was removed from surrounding farms. The lithograph is reprinted in black and white in the book, A Virginia Village Goes to War--Falls Church During the Civil War by Bradley E. Gernand, on page 180, but also is published in full color as the glossy cover of the book. The original lithograph now resides in the Virginia Room of the Mary Riley Styles Public Library in Falls Church.)

Soldiers from the Minor's Hill camps built their lodgings using wood they took from area farmers—they dismantled miles of wooden fencing; barns; even homes. Farmers felt these deprivations severely.

By the middle of the war Minor's Hill was bound into the military telegraph network. A line connected it with Fort Ethan Allan at Chain Bridge (three miles, with connections to Washington via Fort Corcoran, using four wires), and to Hall's Hill in eastern Arlington County (two miles, using one wire). Upton's Hill was also connected to Fort Ethan Allan, five miles, with connections on to Washington, D.C., using six wires, so it was firmly and securely bound into the communications network, probably by the summer of 1863, when the camps closed and the soldiers were transferred south and west to other theaters of the war.

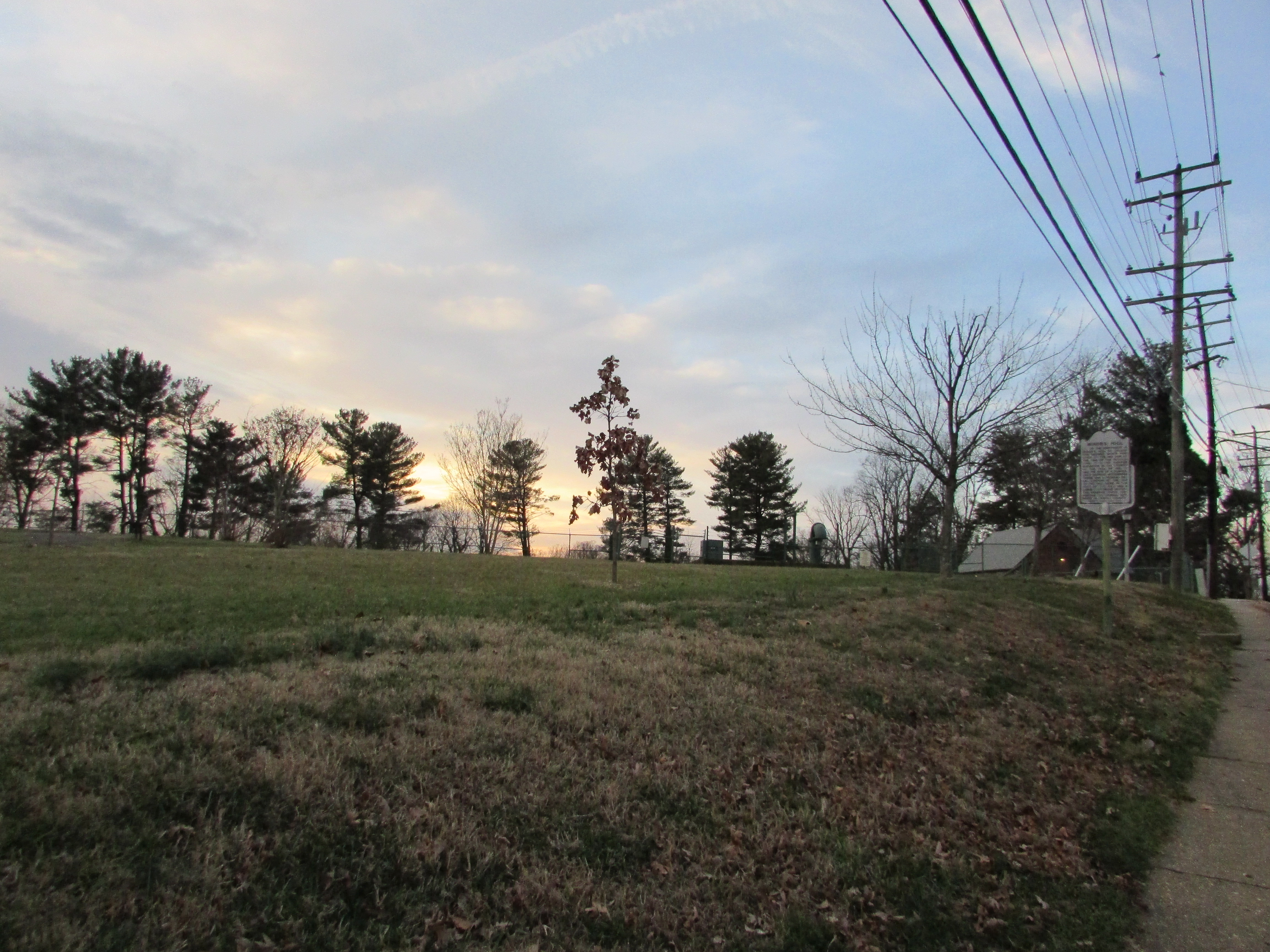
Minor's Hill in 2018

=== Modern era ===
After the Civil War the residents of Falls Church and Minor's Hill rebuilt, and prospered. By 1891, when a Washington Evening Star newspaper reporter visited, Falls Church was neat and tidy. Ascending Minor's Hill he could see "almost a bird's-eye view of Falls Church, which nestles cozily at its base." He could also clearly see the shaft of the Washington Monument and the Episcopal Seminary in Alexandria. Local residents told him that in winter, when leaves were off the trees, the Soldier's Home in northern Washington, D.C. could also be seen. These views are not available today due to the hill's tree cover.

On the eastern side of the hill the reporter came across the ruin of the old brick mansion of George Minor, the hill's original owner. His family was splintered by the war, and lost much. The home site was now owned by others.

From then through the 1940s the hill remained pastoral. During the 1930s, there were two homes owned by Maximillian Ware near where the observation tower had been. One property was purchased by George W. and Katherine Brooks. George Brooks worked for the Dept. of Labor until World War II, at which time he worked for the War Production Board. George and Katherine lived in the home until the early 1950s, when the county acquired the property to build a reservoir and Williamsburg Boulevard (according to an interview with Ed Brooks, former resident).

During the 1950s, a great wave of development spread west from Washington, and by the 1960s the entire hill was developed for housing. A public park on Williamsburg Boulevard at Powhatan Street commemorates the hill's name, and helps preserve it as a place name.

A log cabin structure owned by the Minor family and seen photographed next to a Union observation tower in 1862 was found to still exist as of 2016. It is located on the northwestern part of Minor Hill on modern Virginia Avenue in Mclean. The hand-hewn log cabin with saltbox addition was found partially preserved encased within a brick two-story home, originally on a farm. Fairfax County conducted a historical review of the property and reported the structure to have verifiably existed after 1773, possibly originally as a plantation warehouse that may have been converted into a slave cabin under lessee William Darne prior to its expansion with the addition into a dwelling of members of the Minor family in the nineteenth century.
