= David Bernhard =

American judge

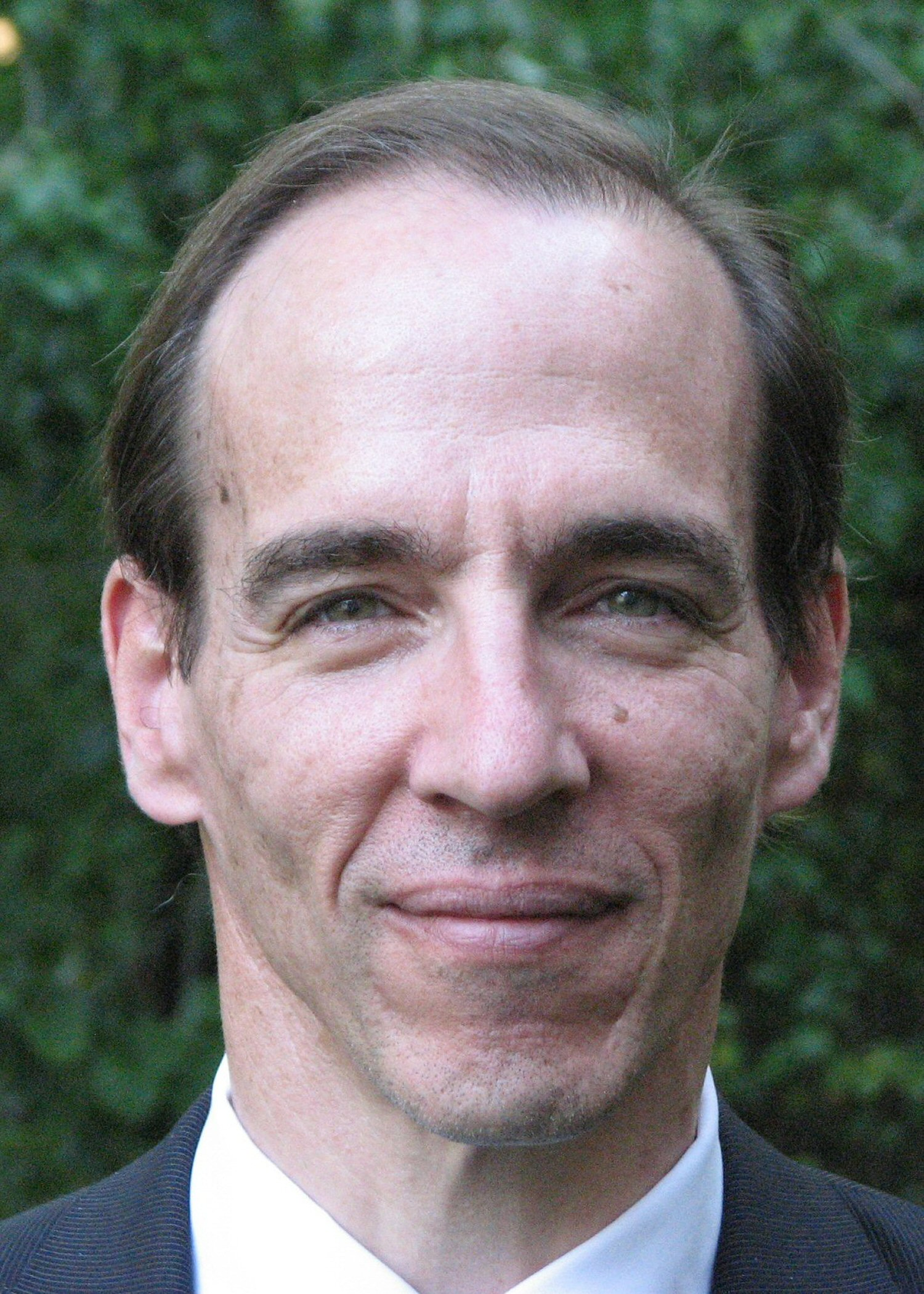
- Bernhard in 2012

Judge of the Court of Appeals of Virginia
- Incumbent
- Assumed office January 1, 2025
- Appointed by: Virginia General Assembly
- Preceded by: Glen A. Huff

Judge of the 19th Judicial Circuit Court of Virginia (Fairfax)
- In office July 1, 2017 – December 31, 2024
- Appointed by: Virginia General Assembly

Personal details
- Born: 1962 (age 63–64) San Salvador, El Salvador
- Education: Washington University School of Law (JD)

David Bernhard (born 1962) is a judge on the Court of Appeals of Virginia.

Bernhard was formerly a trial judge of the Fairfax Circuit Court, elected February 23, 2017, by the Virginia Senate and the Virginia House of Delegates, for an 8-year term commencing July 1, 2017; he was sworn into office on June 30, 2017. On March 7, 2024, the Virginia General Assembly elected him to serve as a judge on the Court of Appeals for an 8-year term commencing January 1, 2025.

Bernhard is the second immigrant, and the first one from Latin America, to have been elected to a Virginia Circuit Court. He is also the first Hispanic and Latino American and first immigrant elected to serve on a Virginia appellate court.

== Early years and education ==
David Bernhard, born in El Salvador, later sought asylum based on family endangerment from leftist guerrillas, and handled his own immigration case while a college student, becoming a United States citizen.

In 1980, Bernhard received his high school diploma from Northfield Mount Hermon School in Northfield, Massachusetts. In 1983, he graduated from Brandeis University in Waltham, Massachusetts, with a B.A. in Economics and Political Science. He completed his J.D. degree in 1985 at Washington University School of Law, in St. Louis, Missouri. He is fluent in the English, Spanish and German languages.

== Career ==
Bernhard was admitted to practice law in Maryland in 1989, Virginia in 1988, the District of Columbia in 1987, Missouri in 1986. From 1991 to 2017 he was in partnership with attorney Cheryl Gardner at the law firm of Bernhard & Gardner. In 2005, Bernhard with Gardner and others, co-founded and until May 2017 co-moderated VADefenses Listserv, an internet-based forum for the advancement of ethics and competence in the practice of criminal law.

Bernhard's trial practice included the handling of a murder case which was the second instance of a jury trial being televised in the Fairfax Circuit Court, engendering debate as to the circumstances under which cameras ought to be allowed in a courtroom. Notable matters he and Cheryl Gardner handled included challenging admissibility of certificates of analysis offered without the presence of a technician in DUI prosecutions, and confronting problems with enforcement of Northern Virginia toll road civil penalty cases, in each case contributing to the enactment of changes to the Code of Virginia. His appeals, which involved collaboration with Gardner, include Virginia's first civil Gideon case, a cooperative effort with Clarence Dunnaville, culminating in amending legislation expanding the right to counsel; the Benitez decision policing abusive litigation practices; and the Kim opinion, providing a bright line test as to when private property is subject to the traffic laws of Virginia applicable to "statutory highways." Bernhard helped reconstitute, and from 2011 to 2014, was co-chair of the Fairfax Bar Criminal Law Practice Section, serving for the last year in collaboration with Michael J. Lindner, for which effort he was recognized with a Fairfax Bar Association President's Award. In 2012 he was named a “Leader in the Law” by Virginia Lawyers Weekly.

== Judicial career ==
In a podcast interview, Bernhard detailed his improbable journey to becoming a judge, and what it is like to serve in such role.

Upon assuming office he was an early proponent and implementer of developing evidence-based sentencing and pre-trial practices. Bernhard has been in the forefront of the elimination of cash from consideration of whether and under which conditions criminal suspects should be released while awaiting trial. He has declined to impose discretionary cash or surety bond release conditions on those accused of crimes, arguing that such monetary requirements often amount to "wealth-based detention" and do little to ensure public safety in the case of the dangerous, while serving in many instances to unnecessarily incarcerate those whose release poses little adverse risk that cannot be addressed through other pretrial terms. Starting in 2017, Bernhard exercised judicial discretion to inform jurors during jury selection of the penalty ranges a defendant faces in the context of examining sentencing bias and reducing the chance of mistrials, and set forth the practical benefits to justice of such practice, in writing. In 2020, the Virginia General Assembly resolved the controversy of whether juries should be so advised by mandating the right to such disclosure by statute.

On August 14, 2020, Bernhard joined fourteen judicial colleagues in adopting a landmark plan to promote racial equality, diversity in qualified candidates for appointment as sub-judges, and other measures to enhance public confidence in the fairness of the Fairfax Circuit Court.

=== Election to the Court of Appeals ===
During 2020-22, Bernhard was among the finalists considered for election to the Court of Appeals and Supreme Court of Virginia, receiving positive evaluations from a number of Bar organizations.

On March 7, 2024, the Virginia General Assembly's Democratic majority voted favorably in the Virginia Senate, and there was a bipartisan favorable vote in the Virginia House of Delegates, electing Bernhard to serve as a judge on the Court of Appeals of Virginia to commence an 8-year term on January 1, 2025. Bernhard became the first Hispanic and Latino American, and the first immigrant, elected to serve on a Virginia appellate court.

== Notable opinions ==
Bernhard has often addressed matters of first impression in Letter Opinion judicial decisions, which in Virginia constitute persuasive authority. Bernhard's notable judicial opinions issued as a trial judge reflect a succinct and accessible writing style that states upfront the what, the how and the why for his decisions, which include among others the following:

- analyzing and rejecting application of the rule of the last antecedent, and determining unlicensed noncommercial lenders are subject to the Virginia Consumer Protection Act;
- finding use of cash bail unconstitutional as-applied;
- granting a defense request as a matter of judicial discretion promoting courtroom neutrality, to conduct a jury trial devoid of a symbolically skewed backdrop of portraits that favor any race, which could unintentionally and mistakenly impart African Americans are of lesser standing in the dispensing of justice.
