= Della Hardman =

American artist (1922–2005)

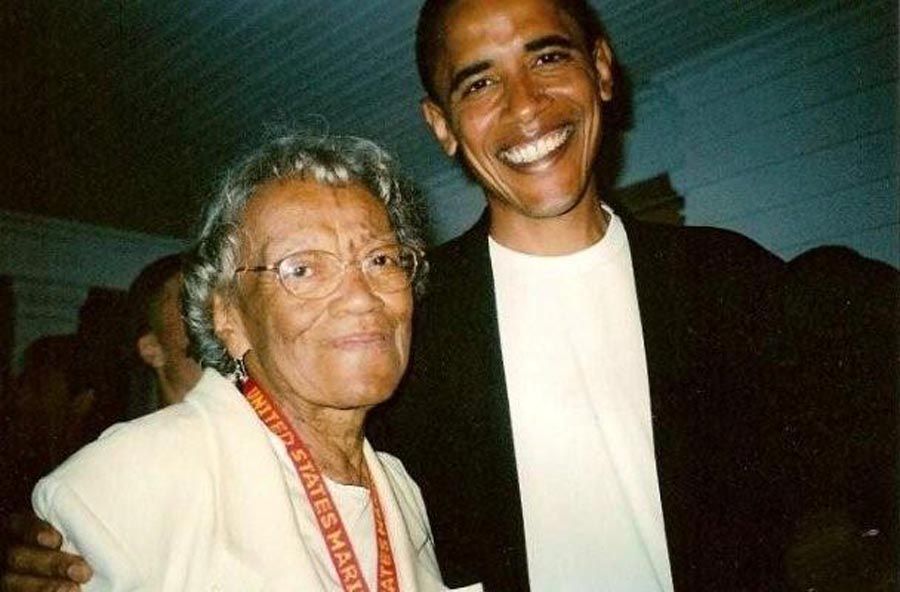
- Della Hardman and Barack Obama
- Born: Della Hardman; May 20, 1922; Charleston, West Virginia, U.S
- Died: December 13, 2005 (aged 83); Martha's Vineyard, U.S
- Occupations: University Professor, Artist, Ph.D.
- Children: Faith Kinard, Andrea L. Taylor, Francis Taylor, II
- Parent(s): A. H. Brown and mother Capitola Brown

Della Brown Taylor Hardman (May 20, 1922– December 13, 2005) was an American artist born in Charleston, West Virginia in 1922.

== Early life and education ==
Educated at the segregated Garnet High School, she later went on to get her degree at West Virginia State University in Institute and then Boston University. In 1946, she married Francis C. Taylor, Sr. She worked at the Fogg Art Museum at Harvard University for two years beginning in 1952. She taught art in the Boston public school system, and in 1956 took a post as an art professor at West Virginia State University, where she taught for 30 years. She hosted "The Black Experience" on WKAZ radio in Charleston, WV between 1978 and 1988. The Della Brown Taylor Art Gallery in the John W. Davis Fine Arts Building on the campus of West Virginia State University was named in her honor.

== Career ==
Della Hardman was a visual artist, specializing in fabrics and ceramics. Her art has been exhibited in galleries across the globe.

Hardman studied at colleges in Europe, Korea, the Caribbean, Latin America, West Africa and Canada. She obtained her Ph.D. at Kent State University in 1994. While at Kent State, she completed a dissertation on William Edward Scott, the second black artist to graduate from the Art Institute of Chicago. She served on the board of trustees of the Charleston Art Gallery and was a member of the National Art Education Association, and was named as Outstanding Art Educator by that group. She was named Alumna of the Year by West Virginia State University.

Later on in life, she moved to Martha's Vineyard, Massachusetts. While there, she was awarded the first Humanitarian Award from the Martha's Vineyard NAACP for her community service.

Della Hardman Day is celebrated every year on the island of Martha's Vineyard. In 2014, Harvard professor Henry Louis (Skip) Gates Jr., a fellow West Virginian, spoke at Della Hardman Day. The event is hosted by the town of Oak Bluffs and the festivities are in Ocean Park on the last Saturday of July.

== Death ==
She died in Martha's Vineyard in 2005.
