= Anderson Brown =

Anderson Brown may refer to:

- Anderson Hunt Brown (1880–1974), American businessman
- Anderson W. Brown (1849–1923), Wisconsin timberman
