= Mary Henderson =

Mary Henderson may refer to:

- Mary Henderson Eastman (1818–1887), American author
- Mary Foote Henderson (1846–1931), American author, real estate developer, and social activist
- Mary H. J. Henderson (1874 –1938), World War I Scottish Women's Hospital administrator, suffragist and war poet
- Mary Ellen Henderson (1885–1976), African-American educator and civil rights activist
- Mary C. Henderson (1928–2012), American historian of theater.
- Mary Henderson (journalist) (1919–2004), Greek-born British journalist and host

== See also ==
- Henderson (surname)
