= Tinner Hill =

- Neighborhood
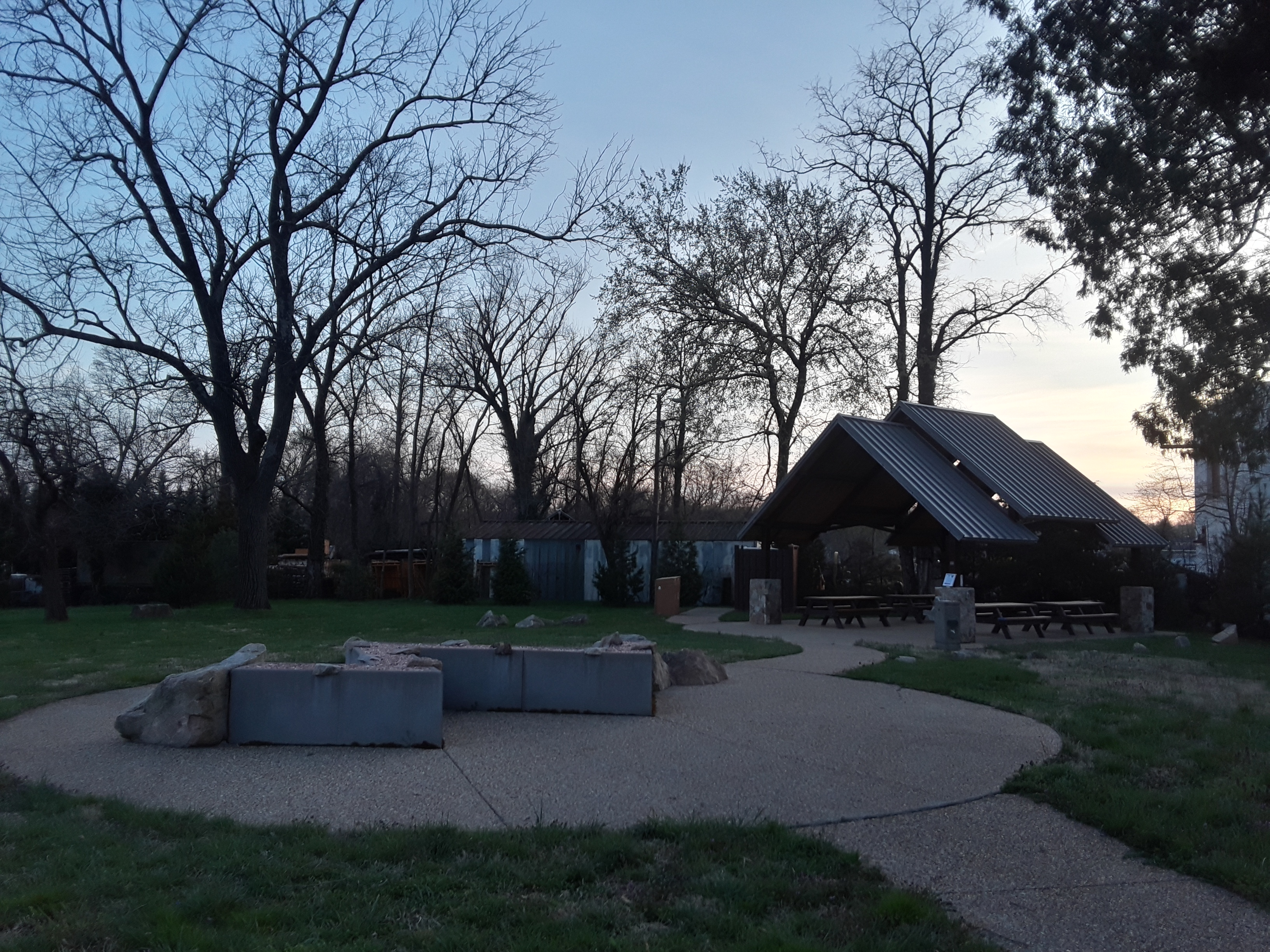
- Tinner Hill Historic Park at dusk
- Named for: Charles and Elizabeth Tinner

Area
  - Total: 1.0 ha (2.5 acres)

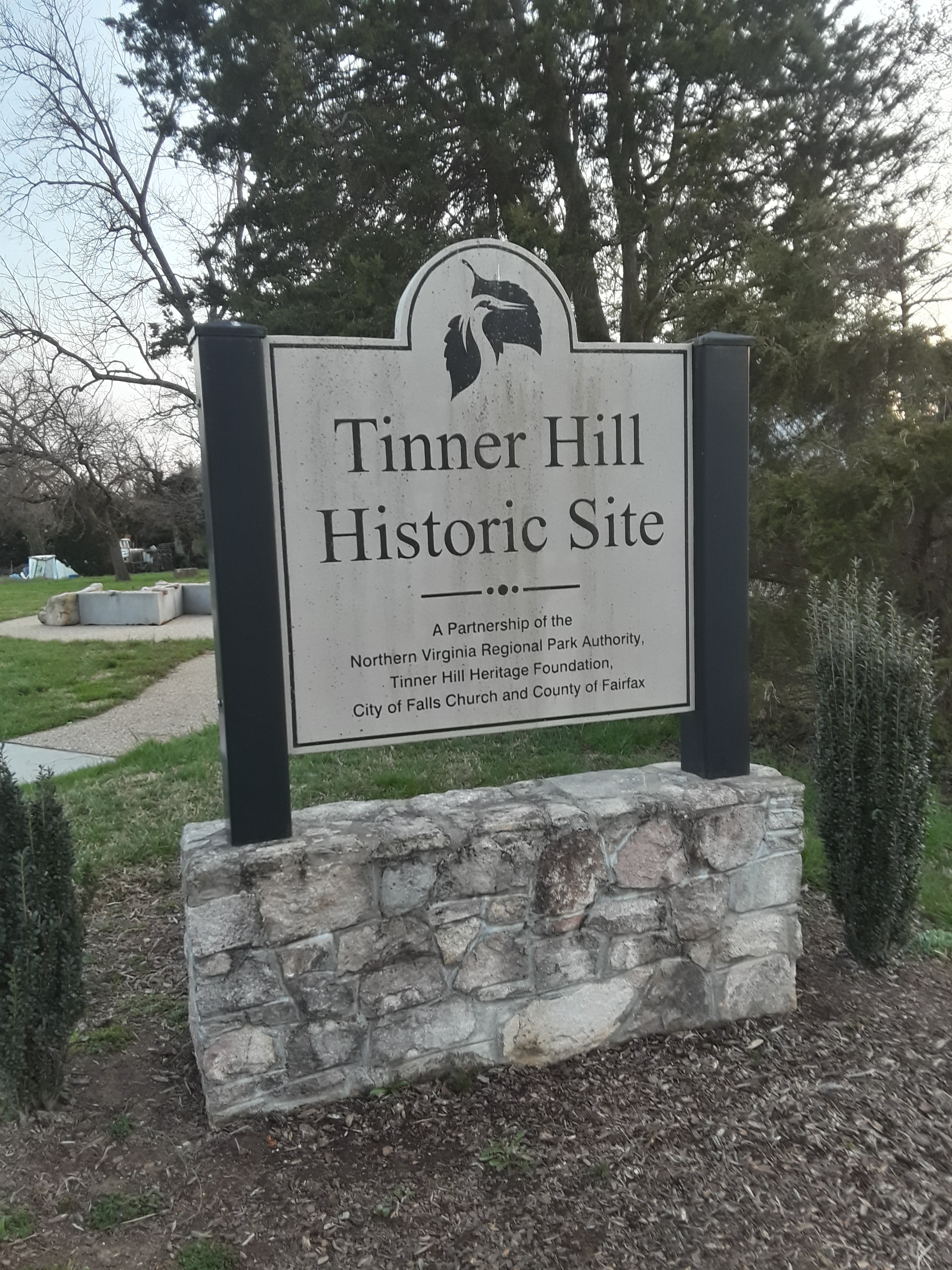
Sign for the Tinner Hill Historic Site

Tinner Hill is a residential neighborhood and historic district on the border of Falls Church, Virginia and Fairfax County named for former resident, Joseph Tinner. It was the site of the first rural branch of the National Association for the Advancement of Colored People (NAACP). Tinner Hill also contains Tinner Hill Historic Park, a memorial park dedicated to the Tinner family, which is administered by NOVA Parks.

== Rural Civil Rights History ==
In 1912, the Virginia General Assembly passed a law permitting localities to create "segregation districts" restricting where Black residents could live. Using this law, the Falls Church Town Council proposed ordinance forcing Black residents into a small district in the southern part of Falls Church. In response, on January 8th, 1915, a group of residents led by Joseph Tinner and Edwin Bancroft Henderson formed the Colored Citizens Protective League (CCPL) to organize resistance against the proposed ordinance.

CCPL efforts included writing to town officials, speaking at town halls, and coordinating protests. On June 8th, 1915, a referendum on the segregation ordinance passed, however, the CCPL received an injunction through the Fairfax Circuit Court preventing the law from taking effect. The ordinance was rendered void in 1917 by the U.S. Supreme Court case Buchanan v. Warley, which found that segregation ordinances violated the 14th Amendment. Due to the CCPL, the segregation ordinance was never enforced. The ordinance was repealed in February, 1999.

In 1918, the NAACP granted a charter to the CCPL, allowing it to become an official branch of the national organization. The branch, known as The Falls Church and Vicinity NAACP, was the first rural branch of the NAACP. The branch had 40 members, with Joseph Tinner as President and Dr. Henderson as secretary. The Falls Church and Vicinity Branch was rechartered as the Fairfax County Branch in 1944, with Joseph Tinner and Dr. Henderson once again acting as founding members. In 1997, The Tinner Hill Heritage Foundation was founded with the mission to preserve and bring awareness to Tinner Hill's civil rights history.

== The Tinner Hill Historic & Cultural District ==
Tinner Hill and the surrounding area have been defined by Falls Church City as a Historic and Cultural district. The district's borders are given by the intersections of South Maple Avenue, West Annadale Road, and the city limit. In addition to Tinner Hill, the district also contains the house of E.B Henderson, four glass panels detailing Falls Church history, the Women's History Walking Trail, and the Written in Stone Walking Trail. Additional contributing historical sites lie just outside the district boundary.

Located on the plot of Joseph and Elizabeth Tinner's original home, The Tinner Hill Historic Site commemorates the history and founding members of Falls Church and Vicinity NAACP. The Historic Site has a series of exhibits and programs that teach visitors about Tinner Hill history.

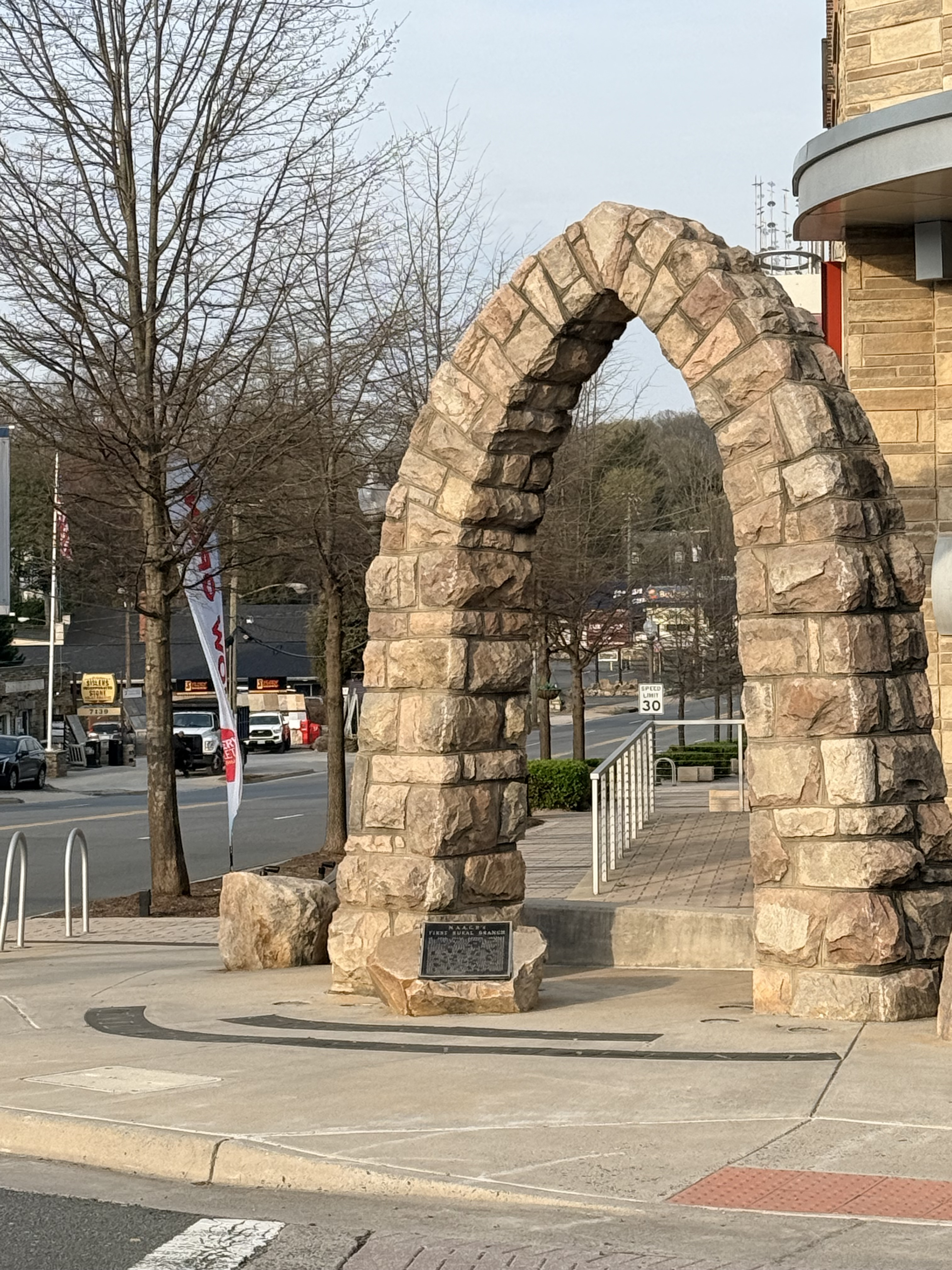
Tinner Hill Arch

The Tinner Hill Civil Rights Monument, colloquially known as the Tinner Hill Arch, was erected by the Tinner Hill Heritage Foundation in 1999 at the intersection of Washington Avenue and Tinner Hill Road. The monument is a 14-foot tall arch with multiple accompanying plaques commemorating the residents of Tinner Hill and the NAACP. The Arch is inspired by a large stand-alone arch built by Joseph Tinner that stood two miles away at Seven Corners decades ago.

The pink granite used for the arch, trondhjemite, was retrieved from demolished buildings in Falls Church that were originally built with stone that Tinner quarried, cut, and shaped. Over 30 Falls Church property owners donated the stones for the monument. The monument was designed so that it can not be disassembled without destruction; the remaining local rock is now irreplaceable, as it is too friable to use in a stand-alone arch.

Local high school art teacher John Ballou drew the concept design with the assistance of architect Mark Coupard and Structural Engineer Guy Razzi. The masonry for the monument was crafted by Roy Morgan of Washington, D.C., and James Ware of Virginia.

== Welcome to Tinner Hill Mural ==
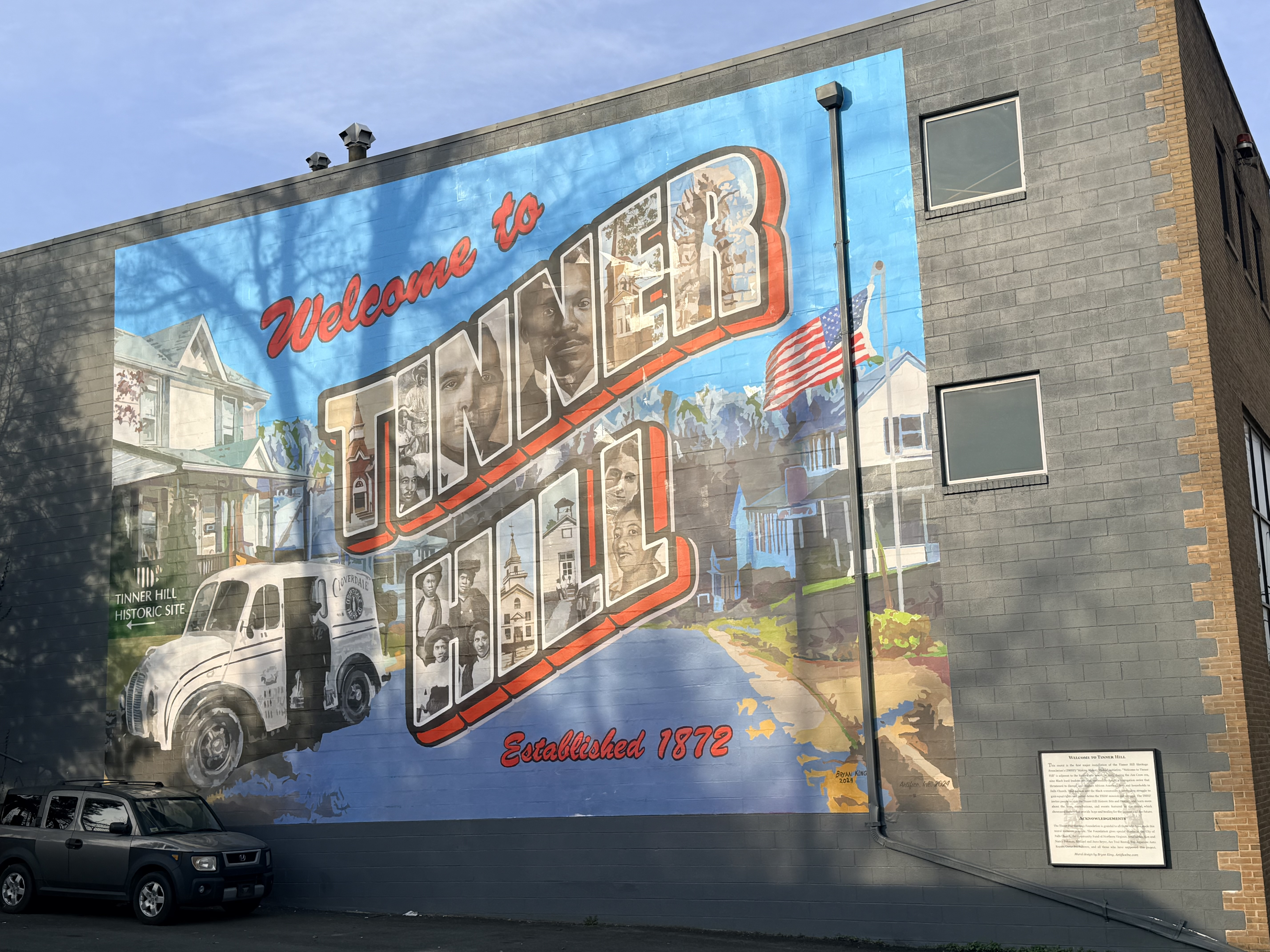
Welcome to Tinner Hill Mural

Painted in vibrant tones by local artist Bryan King, the Welcome to Tinner Hill Mural depicts influential civil rights, business, cultural, and educational figures and early residents of the historically segregated Tinner Hill neighborhood.

Reference include the Tinner Hill Arch, the community churches and ministers, the Falls Church Colored School, founding community leaders Joseph Tinner, Dr. E.B. Henderson, and educators Mary Ellen Henderson and Lola Saunders. In the background, a wayfaring arrow points to the Tinner Hill Historic site which is up the hill to the left.

== Tinner Hill Heritage Foundation ==
The Tinner Hill Heritage Foundation, founded in 1997 and located at 114 Tinner Hill Road, is an organization dedicated to maintaining Tinner Hill History. The Foundation is responsible for building monuments, conducting oral histories, painting murals, constructing a heritage trail, and erecting historic markers in the area. The Foundation successfully encouraged the local school system to name its middle school for Mary Ellen Henderson, the principal of the Falls Church Colored School. The Foundation also hosts an annual music festival to entertain and carry its message of community well being in Falls Church.

Pictures of Tinner Hill
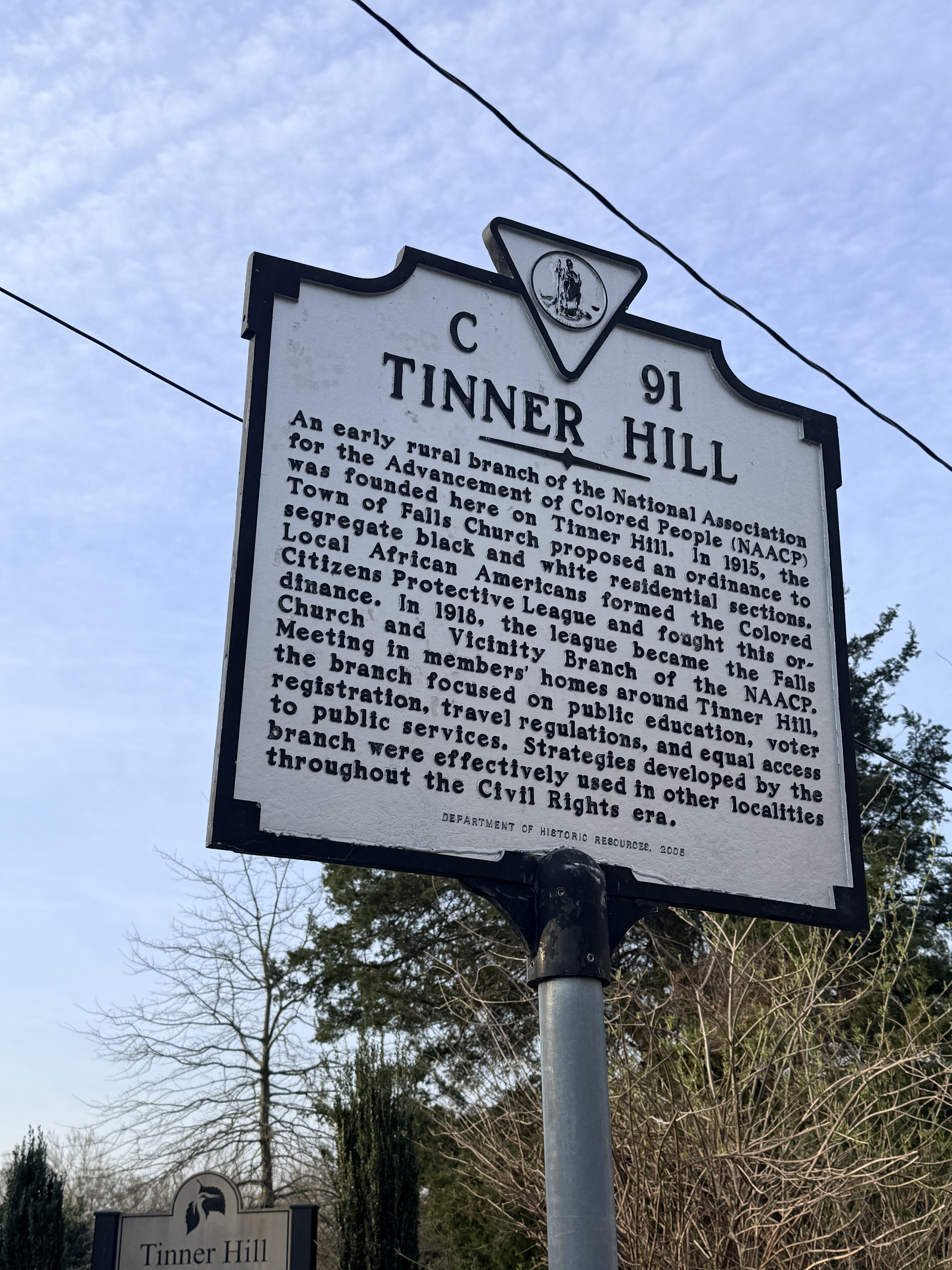
A sign explaining the history of Tinner Hill

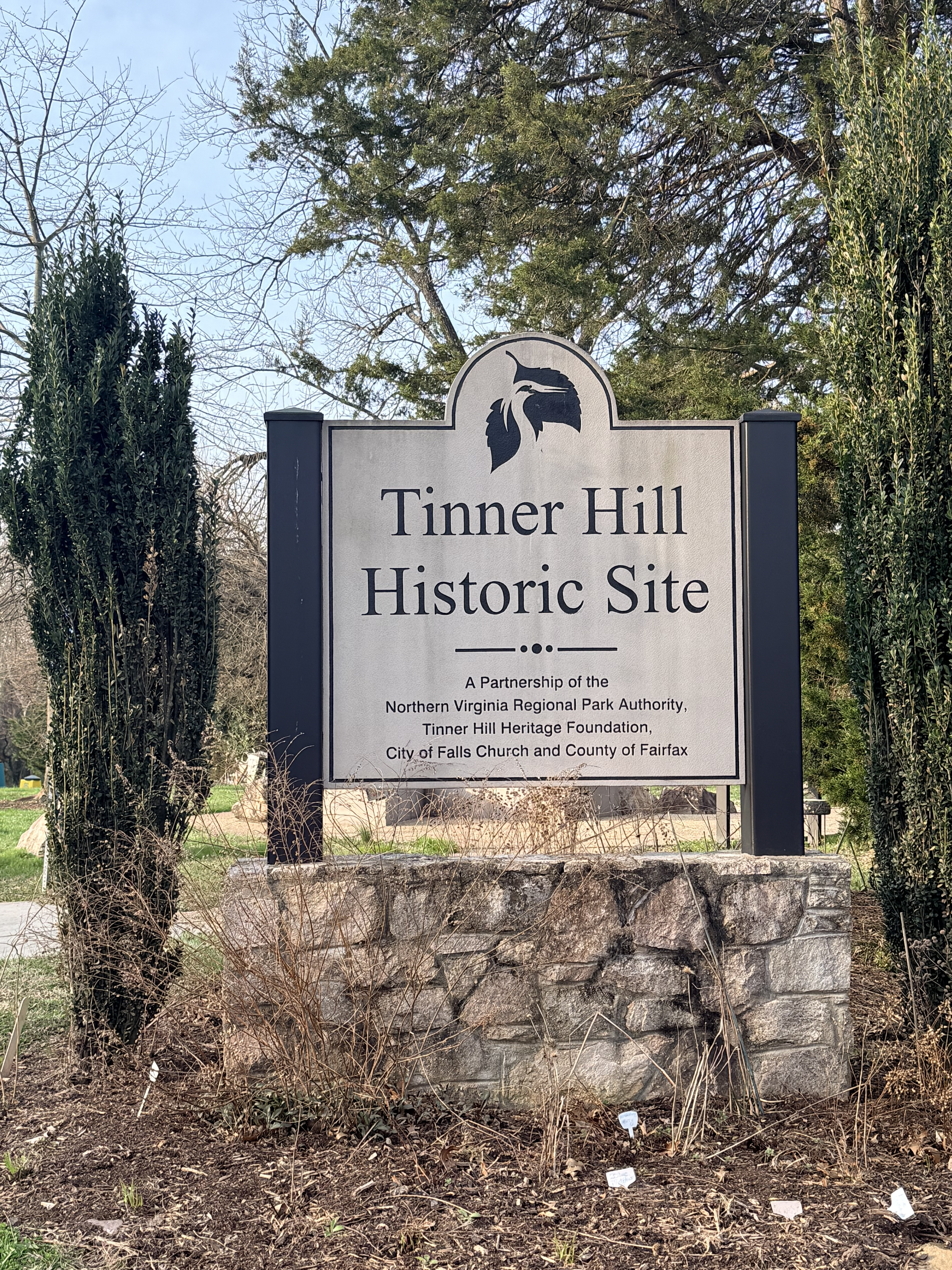
Sign displaying that the location is known as the Tinner Hill Historic Site

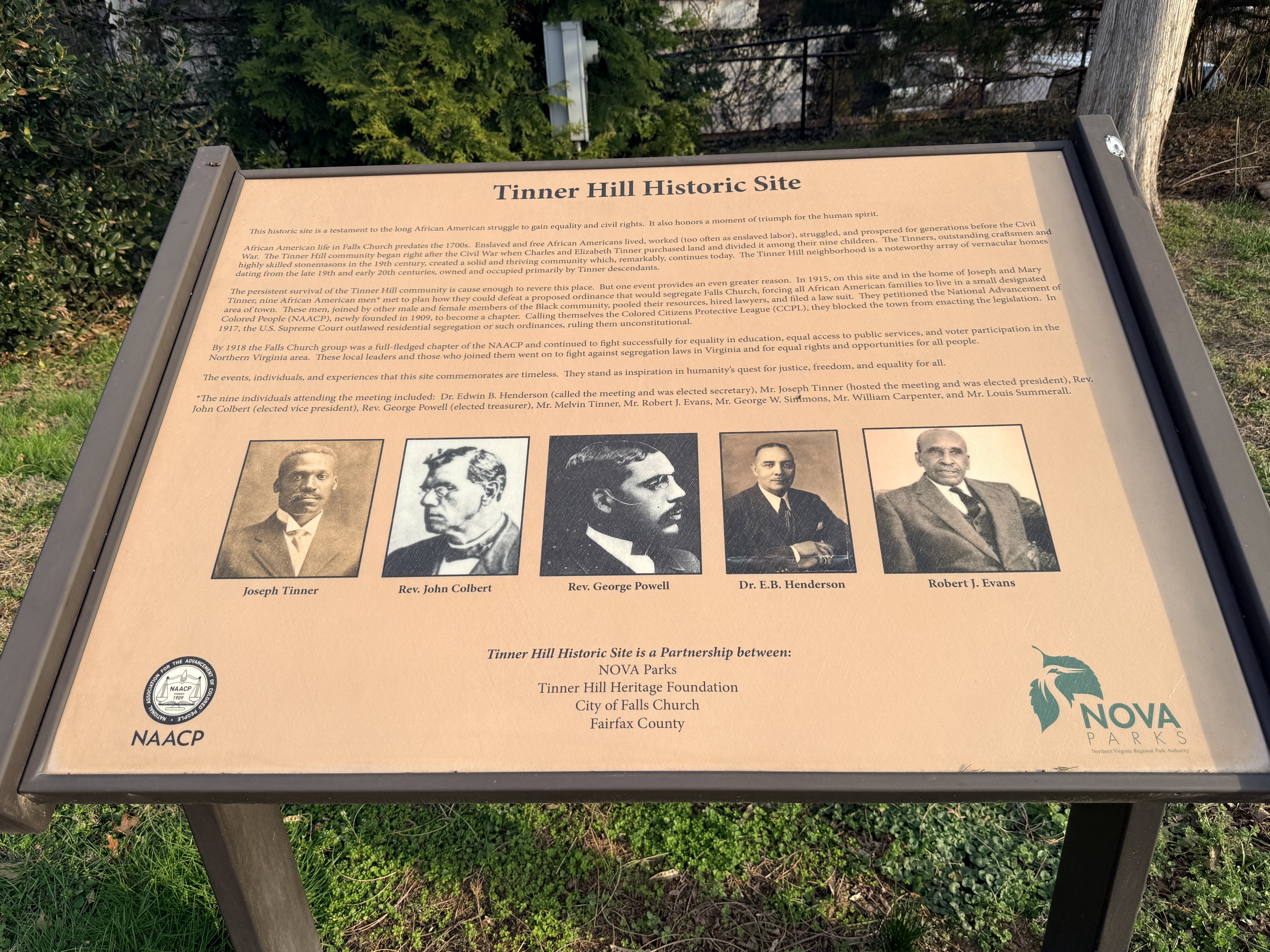
A sign placed by NOVA Parks explaining the significance of Tinner Hill

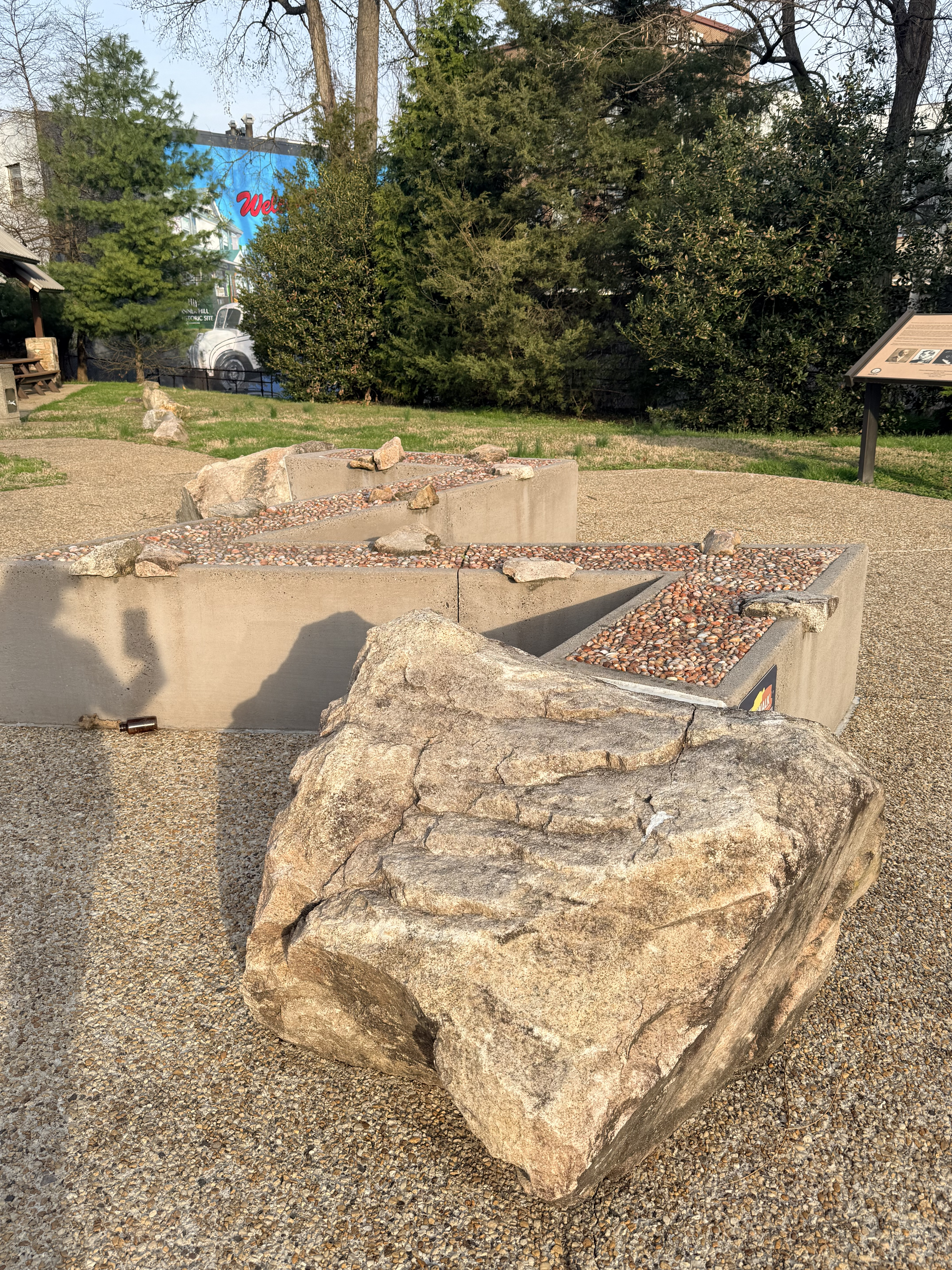
The Tinner Hill Zig Zag Monument with Mural in background

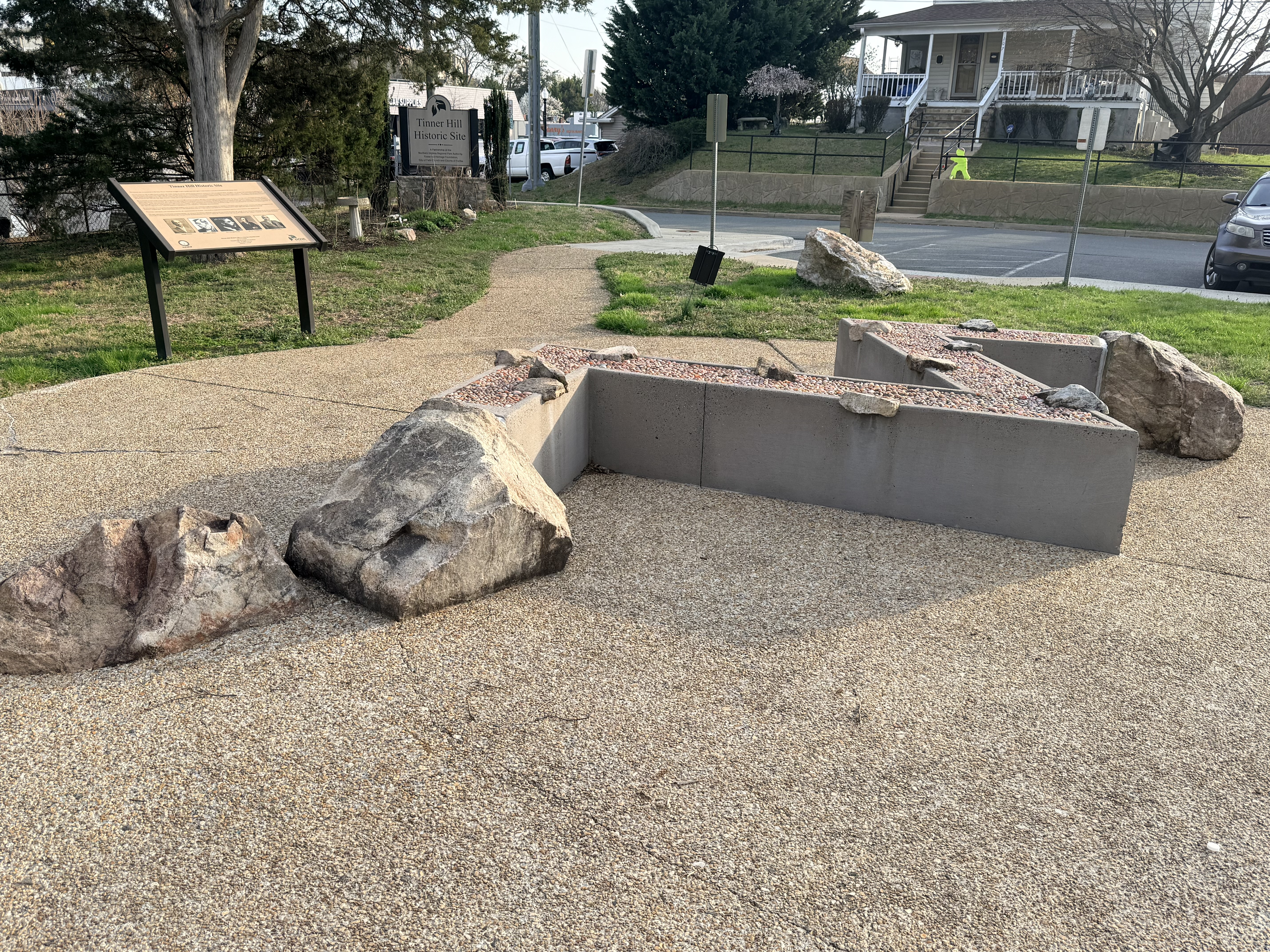
The Tinner Hill Zig Zag Monument as seen facing Tinner Hill Road

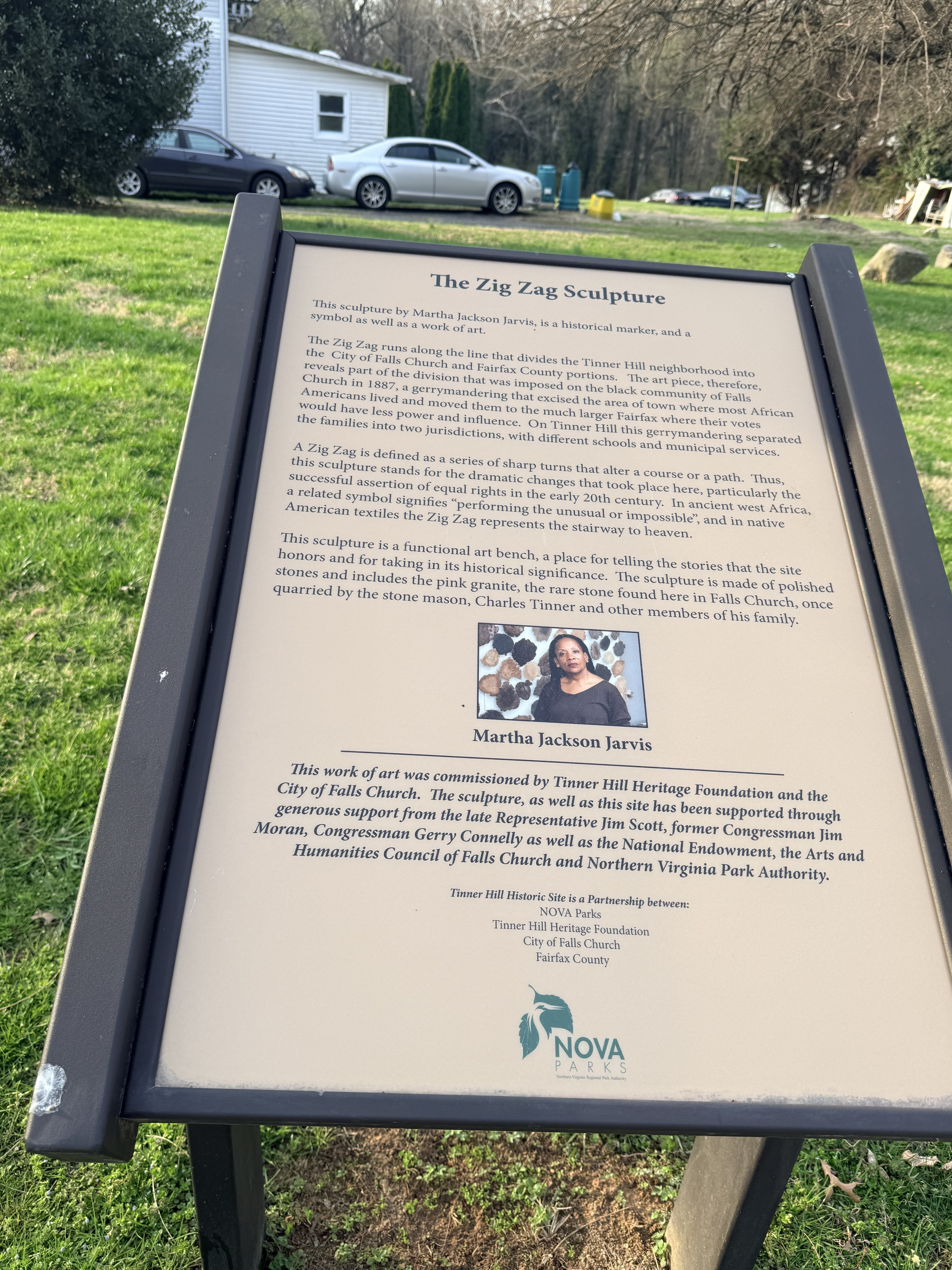
Sign giving information on Tinner Hill Zig Zag Monument

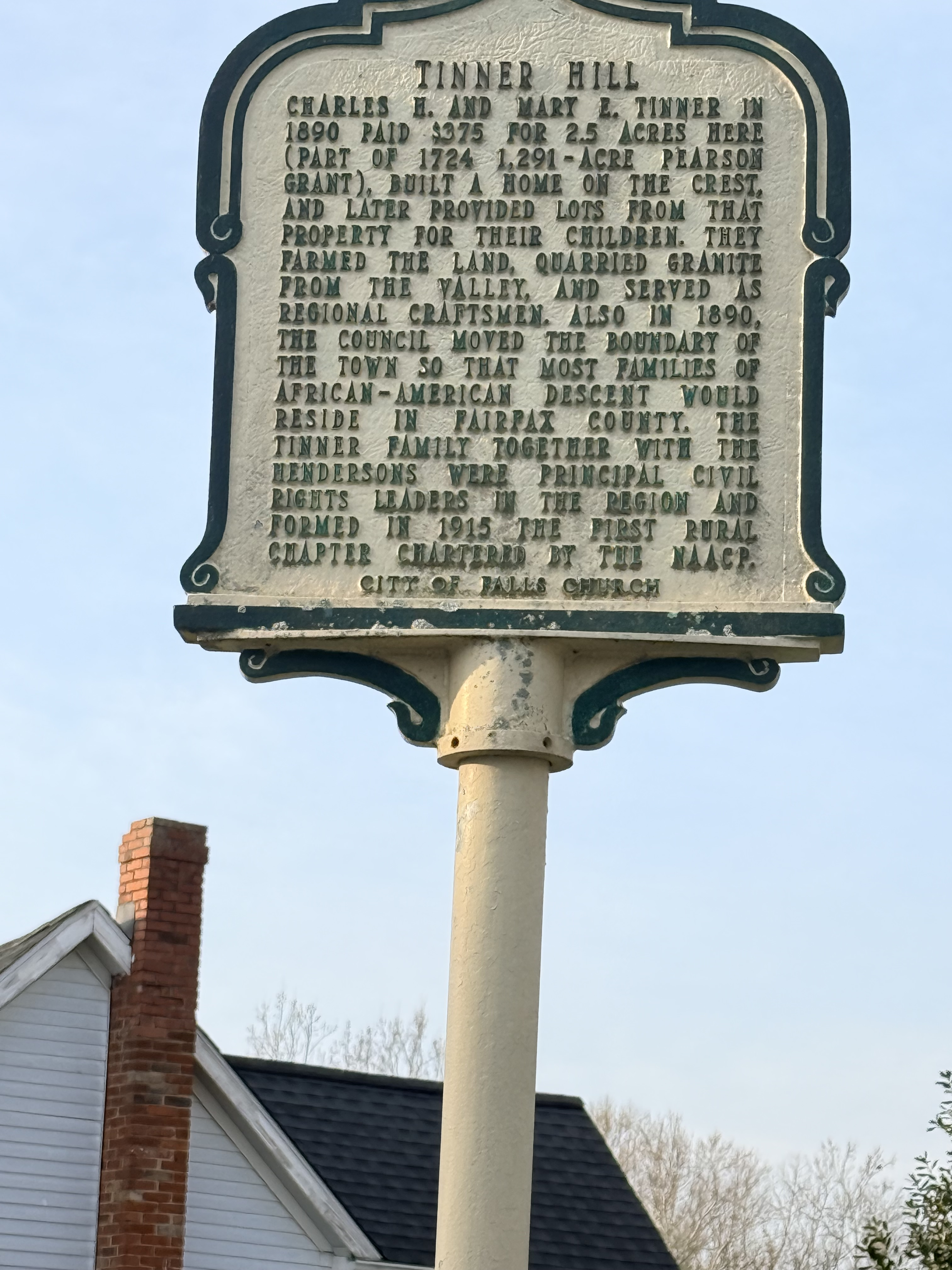
Sign naming Tinner Hill and providing information

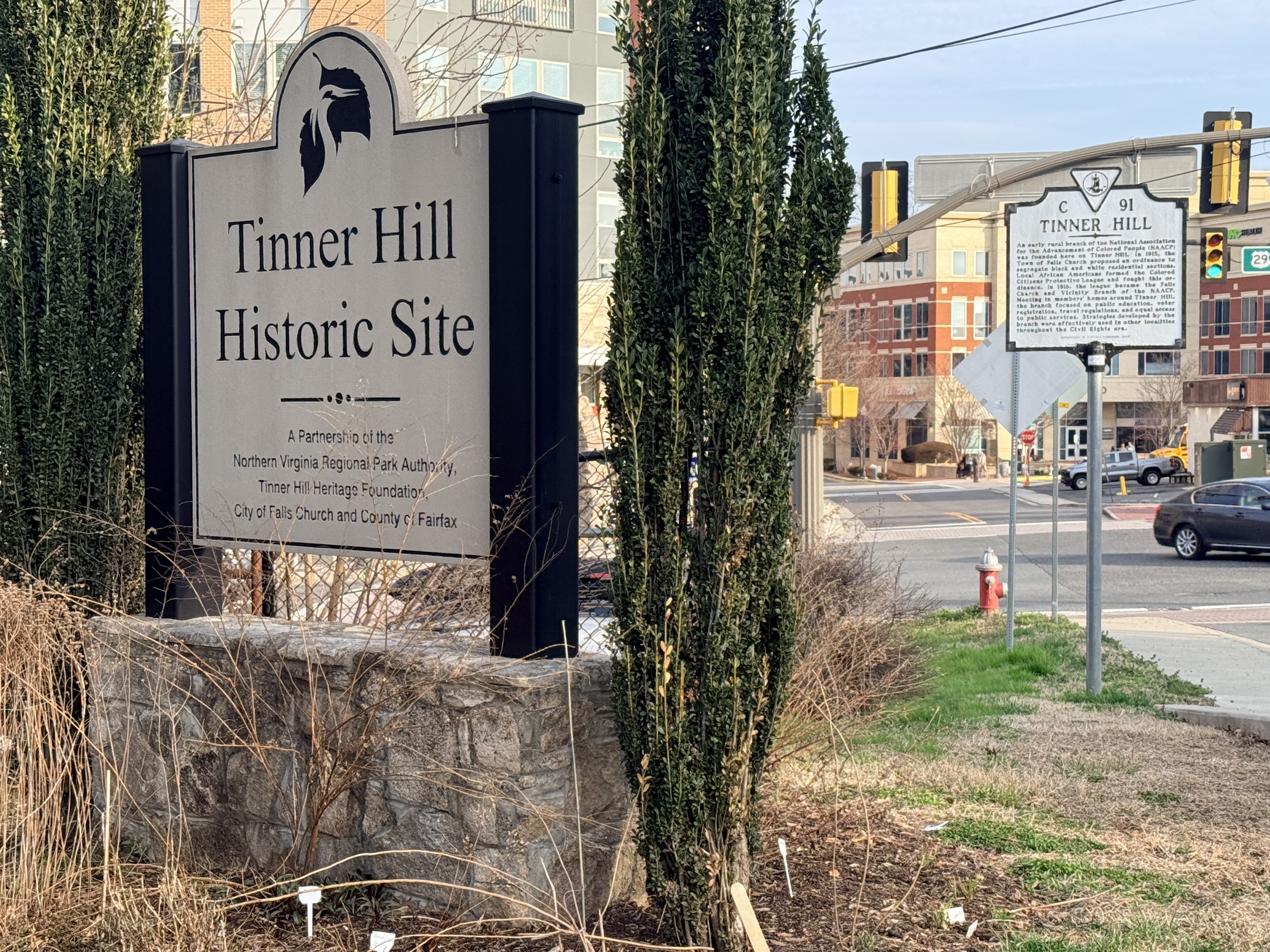
Tinner Hill Historic Site as seen facing S Washington Street
