= National Home for Destitute Colored Women and Children =

- U.S. National Register of Historic Places
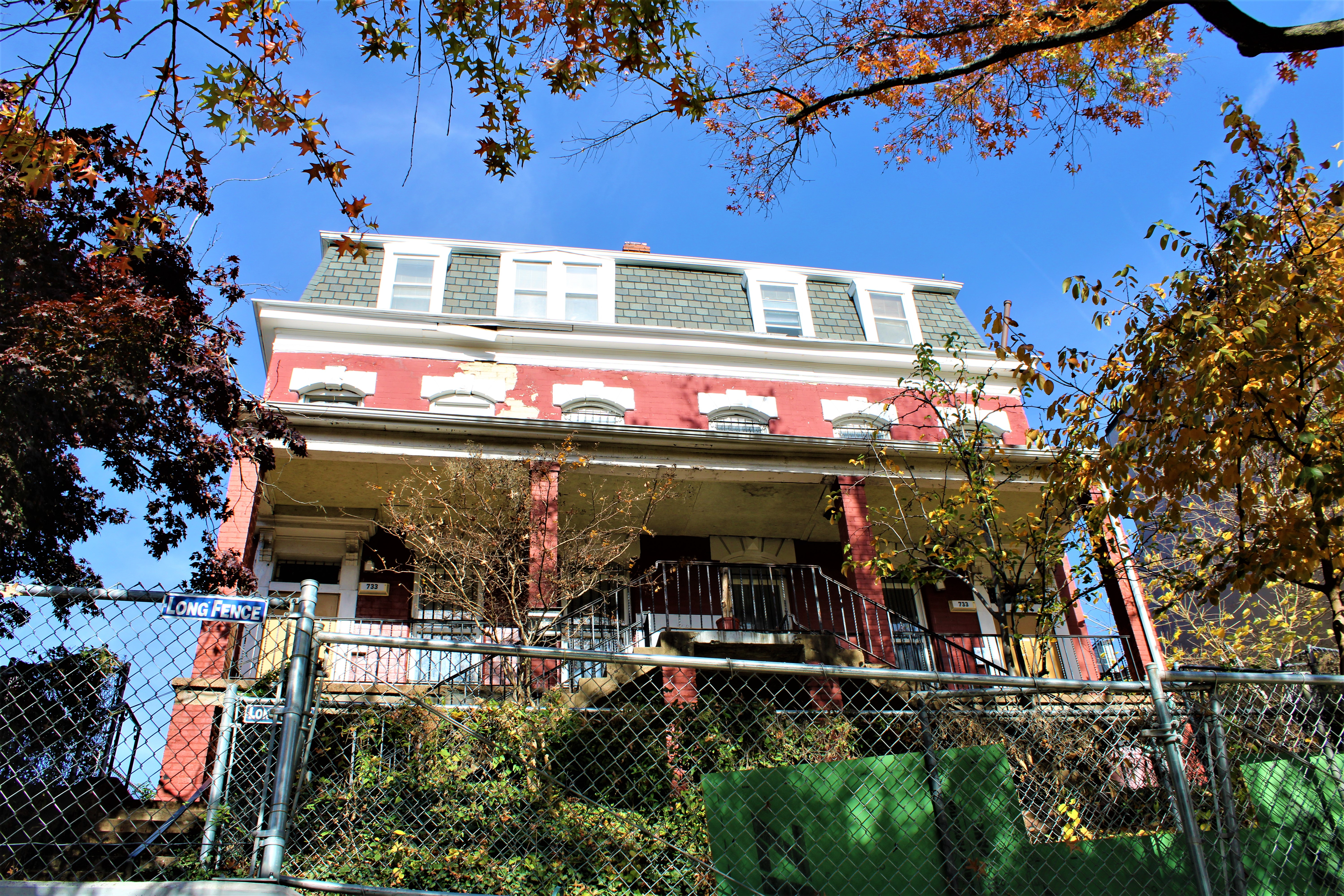
- The former home of the National Home for Destitute Colored Women and Children in 2022.

- Location within District of Columbia Location within the United States
- Location: 733 Euclid Street, N.W., Washington, D.C.
- Coordinates: 38°55′27″N 77°01′25″W
- Built: c. 1879
- NRHP reference No.: 100008262
- Added to NRHP: October 5, 2022

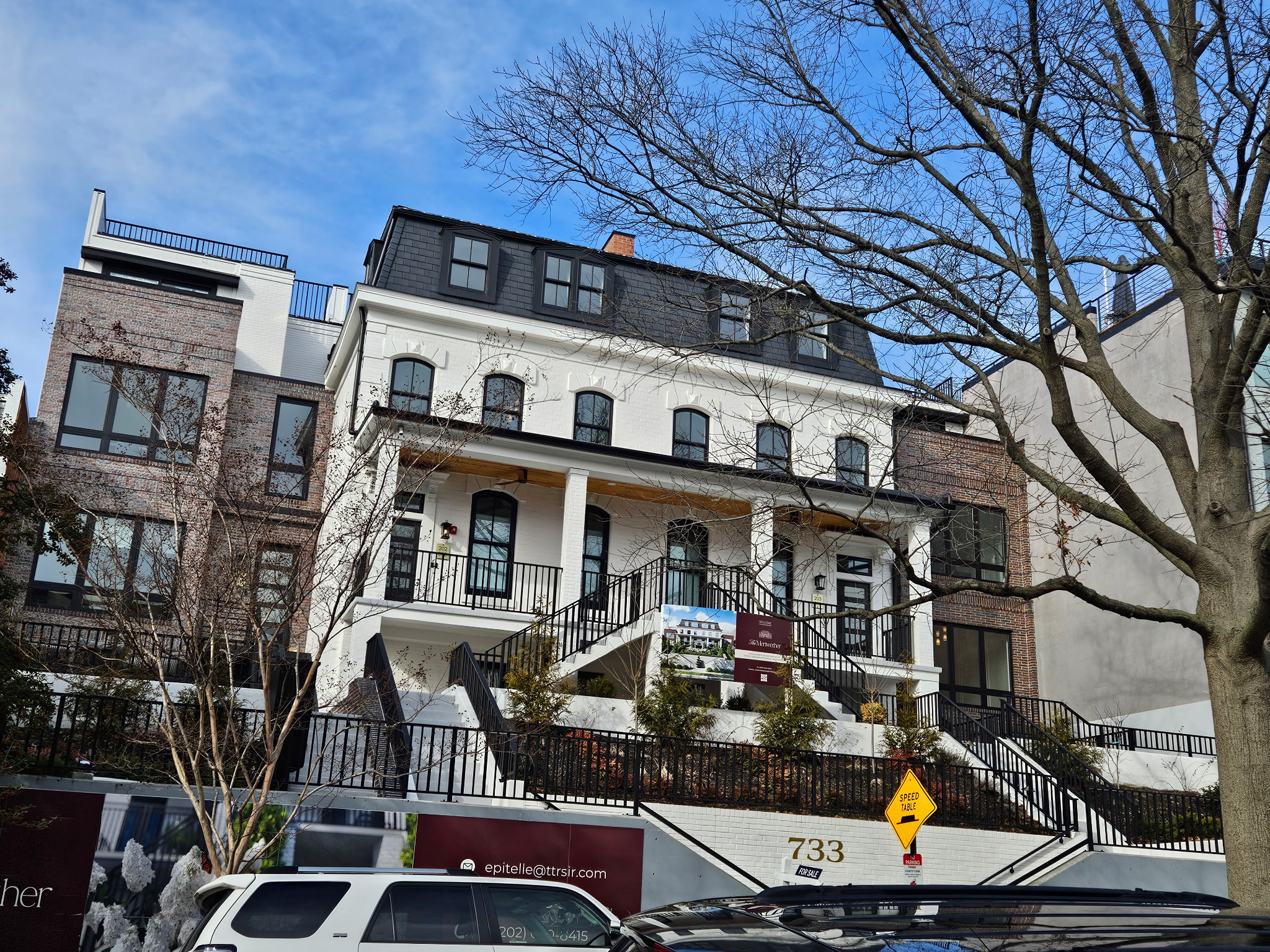
Redeveloped building on the former site of the National Home for Destitute Colored Women and Children in Washington, D.C., now a 12-unit condominium.

The National Home for Destitute Colored Women and Children, later known as the Merriweather Home for Children, was a relief association in the Pleasant Plains neighborhood of Washington, D.C.

Founded in 1863 to house and educate formerly enslaved women and children who fled to Washington during the American Civil War, the organization would go on to operate for more than a century, becoming the only orphanage for African American children in the city by the 1950s.

In 2022, the National Home's former building at 733 Euclid Street N.W. was listed on the National Register of Historic Places.

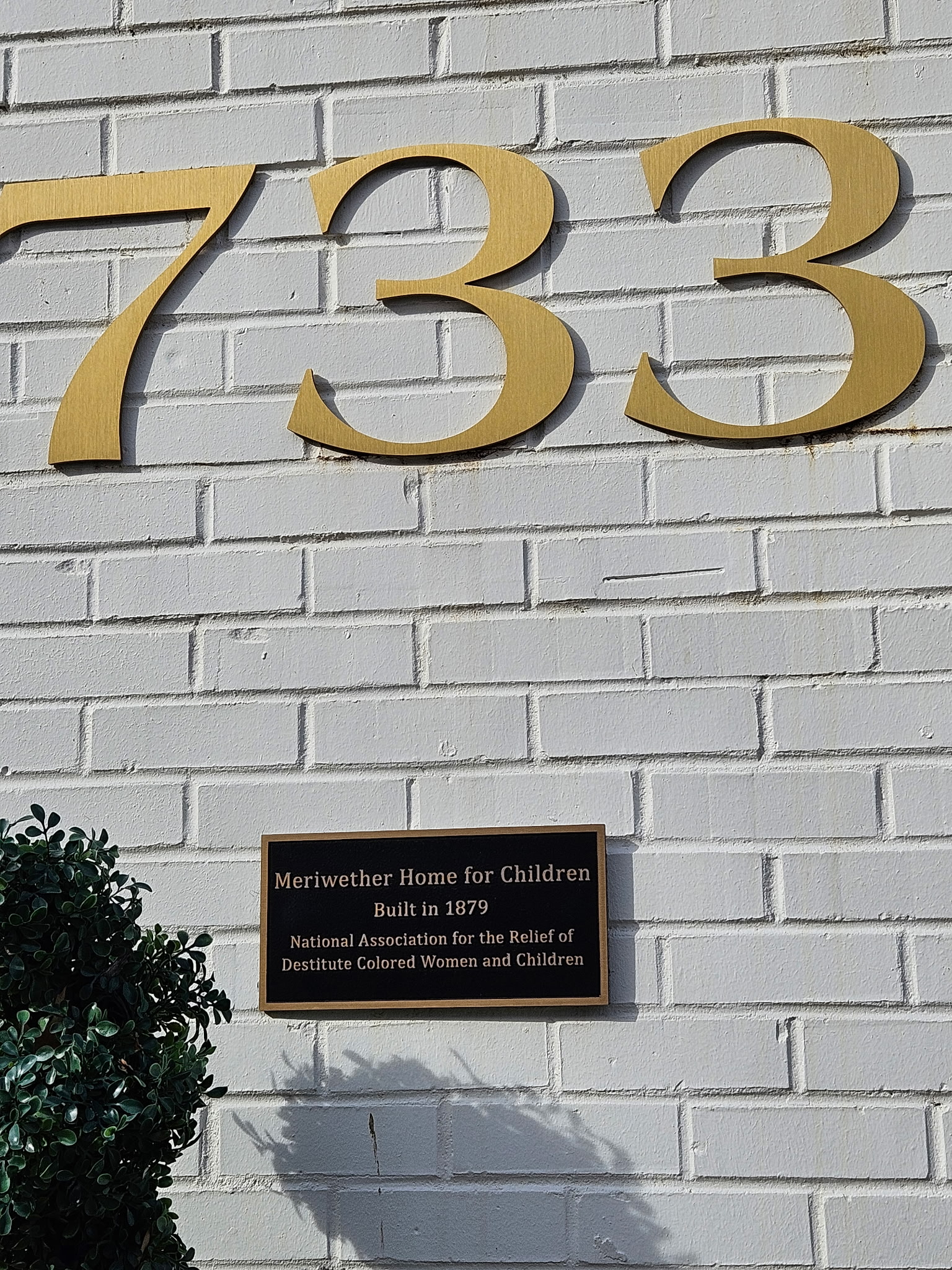
Commemorative plaque at 733 Euclid Street N.W., marking the former National Home for Destitute Colored Women and Children built in 1879.

== History ==
As formerly enslaved people fled to Washington, D.C., during the American Civil War, they faced dire conditions, with an estimated one-third of these escapees in Washington dying between 1862 and 1866. The organization emerged during a time when formerly enslaved individuals had limited access to housing, education, and social services. While efforts such as the Freedmen's Bureau attempted to provide assistance, many African American women and children continued to relay on private charitable institutions like this one for support. In 1863, a group of women including Elizabeth Keckly founded the National Association for the Relief of Destitute Colored Women and Children to help them. Keckly, who helped raise funds to establish the home, spent her final years living in the home after falling on hard times. She later died there in 1907. The association sought to be "an asylum for the freed orphans and destitute aged women, whom the onward march of freedom has left to the care of the benevolent." Its National Home for Destitute Colored Women and Children worked to both house and educate African American women and children.

While the majority of the organization's original founders were white, it had a long history of management by African American Washingtonians. Frederick Douglass, James Wormley, and Charles Burleigh Purvis were among its first Black trustees in the 1870s. Among the founders was Helen Appo Cook who served as secretary and president of the association until her passing in 1913. During this time she also became one of the founders of the Colored Women's League in 1892. Another especially notable among these Black leaders is Mary Robinson Meriwether, who became the organization's president in 1915, after whom it was renamed the Merriweather Home for Children sometime between the 1930s and 1950s.

After being forced out of its original location at the Burleith estate in the early postwar years, the association moved east to what is now the Pleasant Plains neighborhood, at the now-defunct address of 2458 Eighth Street N.W. It operated there for several decades, then bought a property at 733 Euclid Street N.W. in 1930. After the move, it tightened the focus of its activities to solely caring for children.

By the 1950s, the Merriweather Home was the only private orphanage for Black children in Washington. It continued to operate until 1971, when the nearly bankrupt institution was accused of inhumane conditions and shut down.

== Structure ==
The building at 733 Euclid Street N.W. was constructed around 1879 in the Second Empire style. It was built as part of the Todd & Brown's Subdivision in the Pleasant Plains neighborhood of Northwest Washington D.C. Originally a duplex, it was converted into one unit by the National Home after it purchased the house. The organization subsequently built on a rear addition, and it is also thought that the home's porch was constructed at this time.

The home's design is marked by its Second Empire-style mansard roof, round-arched windows, and front porch. It sits up high behind a retaining wall.

After the Merriweather Home shuttered in the early 1970s, it was converted to the Marie Key Day Care Center, which operated from 1975 to 1998. Then, the building was given a new life when, around 2006, a community leader named Sylvia Robinson took over the property and built a community center known as the Emergence Community Arts Collective (ECAC) there. In the 21st century, the site continued to serve as a community resource. The ECAC, provided arts programming, educational activities, and community services for local residents. This continued use highlights the building's long-standing role as a space of support and engagement within the Pleasant Plains community. After Robinson's death in 2017, ECAC faced significant financial challenges, and it sold the property in 2022. The new owner's plans to convert the structure into four townhouses was met with concern from the local community, prompting activists to seek a historic designation. That summer, it was designated a D.C. Historic Landmark, halting the developer's plans to raze the building.

In October 2022, the home was designated a historic property by the National Register of Historic Places.

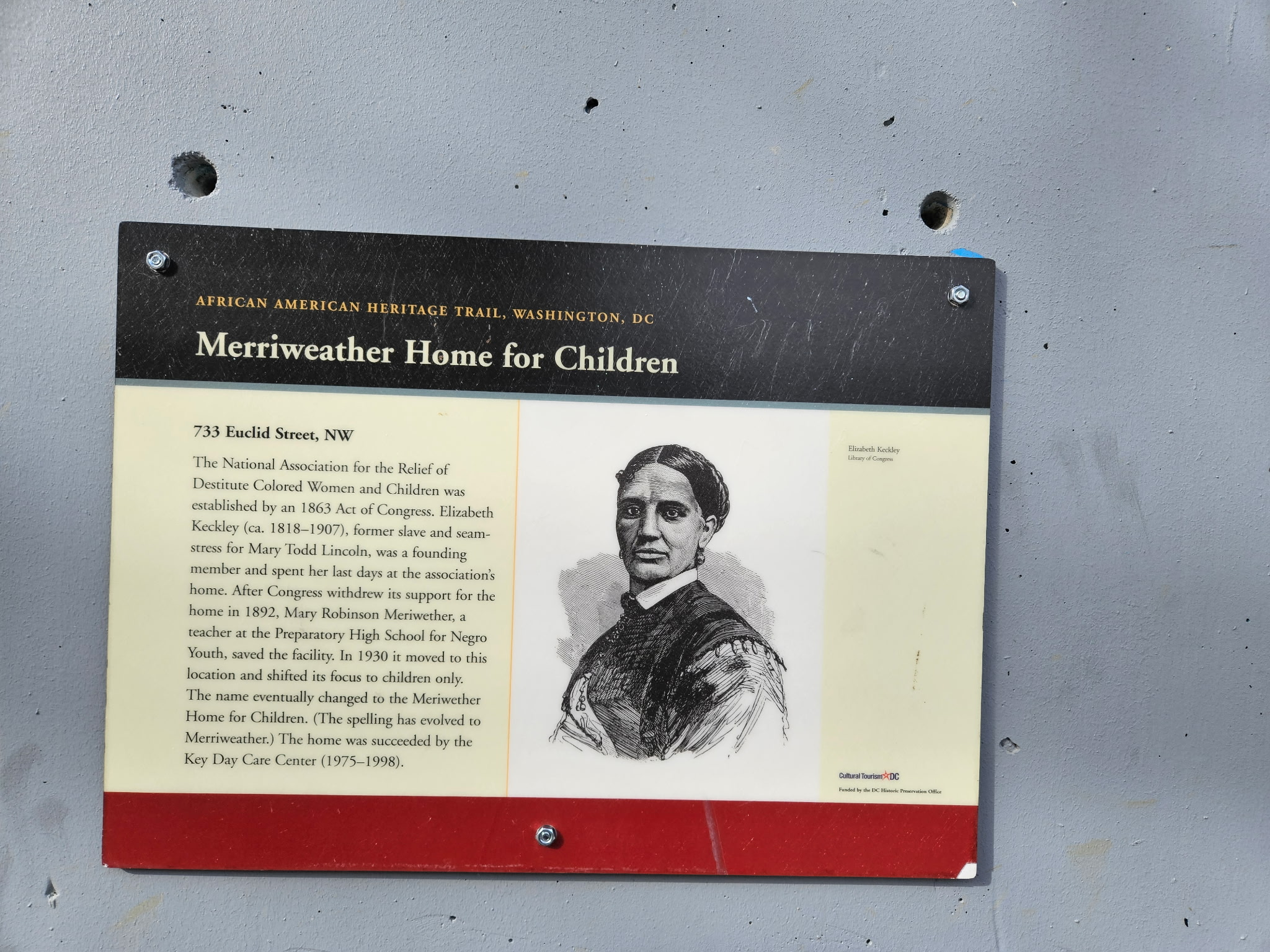
African American Heritage Trail sign at the former site of the Merriwether Home for Children, 733 Euclid Street NW, Washington, D.C., detailing the history of the National Association for the Relief of Destitute Colored Women and Children.
