= Edwin Henderson =

American educator and activist (1883–1977)

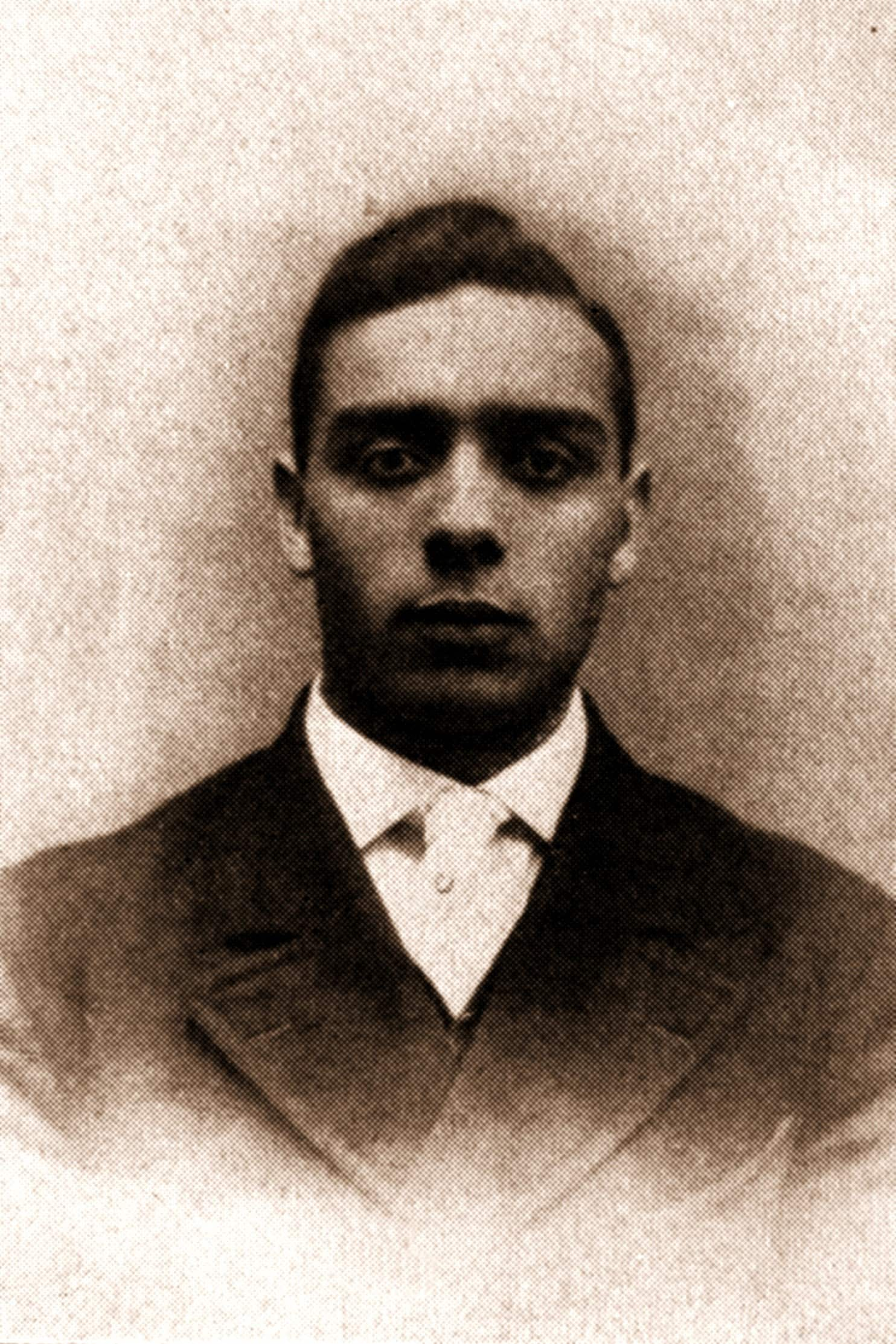
- Henderson in 1912
- Born: Edwin Bancroft Henderson; November 24, 1883; Washington, D.C., US
- Died: February 3, 1977 (aged 93); Tuskegee, Alabama, US
- Education: Howard University (BA); Columbia University (MA); Central Chiropractic College (Ph.D.)
- Occupations: Educator; Civil rights activist; physical education teacher
- Spouse: Mary Ellen Henderson

Edwin Bancroft Henderson (November 24, 1883 – February 3, 1977), was an American educator and National Association for the Advancement of Colored People (NAACP) pioneer. Called the "Father of Black Basketball", he introduced basketball to African Americans in Washington, D.C., in 1904, and was Washington's first male African American physical education teacher. From 1926 until his retirement in 1954, Henderson served as director of health and physical education for Washington, D.C.'s black schools. An athlete and team player rather than a star, Henderson both taught physical education to African Americans and organized athletic activities in Washington, D.C., and Fairfax County, Virginia, where his grandmother lived and where he returned with his wife in 1910 to raise their family. A prolific letter writer both to newspapers in the Washington, D.C., metropolitan area and Alabama, Henderson helped organize the Fairfax County branch of the NAACP and twice served as President of the Virginia NAACP in the 1950s.

== Early and family life ==
Henderson was born in southwest Washington, D.C., on November 24, 1883. His father, William Henderson, was a day laborer and his mother Louisa taught him to read at an early age. He reminisced about Al Jolson having been one of his playmates, as well as how he watched racial segregation grow in Washington after the turn of the century, particularly during the Woodrow Wilson administration. His grandmother Eliza Thomas Henderson had a small store in Washington, but in 1882 (the year before his birth) had moved to Falls Church, Virginia and bought a house at 121 S. Washington Street. Henderson became familiar with that area too, spending summers there and sometimes assisting at that store. The family farm, bought about a decade later, had once been part of Camp Alger. Henderson graduated from Dunbar High School, then the Miner Normal School (now known as University of the District of Columbia) in 1904.

He earned a bachelor's degree from Howard University, a master's degree from Columbia University, and a PhD in athletic training from Central Chiropractic College in Kansas City, Missouri. Henderson became the first black man to receive a National Honor Fellowship in the American Association for Health, Physical Education and Recreation. Shortly before his retirement from the D.C. Schools at age 70, Henderson also received an Alumni Achievement Award from his alma mater, Howard University.

He married Mary Ellen Henderson (1886–1976), also a teacher and civil rights advocate, as well as active with the Girl Scouts and League of Women Voters. They moved to Falls Church, Virginia in 1910 shortly after their marriage, and both helped at the Henderson family store. They lived at 307 South Maple Street (originally 307 W. Fairfax Street) for decades; Henderson also took the colored streetcar line across the Potomac River to his job with the D.C. Public Schools. They also had a summer home at Highland Beach on Chesapeake Bay near Annapolis, Maryland. The Hendersons remained married for 63 years until her death.

== Career ==
Upon graduating as a teacher in 1904, Henderson taught (and later directed) physical education in the D.C. public schools for five decades. During his first three summer breaks, he attended summer sessions at Harvard University to study medicine or health and physical education. There, Henderson also learned the then-new game of basketball, which he introduced to other young black men at the 12th Street (Colored) YMCA upon returning to Washington, D.C. Soon, they were playing teams from Baltimore, Philadelphia and New York. His D.C. teams (Howard University adopted the 12th street team as its first varsity basketball team) won the national basketball championships in 1909 and 1910.

Through the 1950s, Henderson also played and coached basketball, as well as refereed football and baseball contests and occasionally sparred in the boxing ring. He helped organize the first all-black amateur athletic association, the Interscholastic Athletic Association (1906), the Washington, D.C., Public School Athletic League (1906) and the Eastern Board of Officials (1905) (a training center that, for decades was the go-to pool for highly qualified African American referees). Henderson taught and influenced Washington area schoolchildren in basketball, including Duke Ellington and Charles Drew.

From 1926 until 1954, Henderson directed physical education for African American children in the segregated Washington, D.C., school system. He used sports to combat truancy, as well as instill character, forming teams in each fifth and sixth grade classroom. In 1943 his contributions were recognized by his being named to the National Council on Physical Fitness and the subcommittee on colleges and schools of the National Committee on Physical Fitness. Henderson retired shortly after the Brown v. Board of Education decision made segregated schooling obsolete, so the position evaporated, but he was made a fellow of the American Association for Health, Physical Education and Recreation.

During World War II, Henderson helped train Army recruits. In the 1940s, Henderson also advocated for civil rights, including for interracial athletic competitions. Among the battles he fought in the 1940s was picketing the Uline Arena (originally a hockey venue and later called the "Washington Coliseum"), because the Uline would not allow African Americans and Whites to compete against each other. After hearing the AAU Golden Gloves Boxing competitions were to be held at the Uline, Henderson encouraged picketing until Eugene Meyer, publisher of The Washington Post, withdraw his support for holding the event there. Efforts by Henderson and Meyer ultimately led to the AAU allowing integrated boxing in the District of Columbia.

Henderson wrote several books about African American participation in sports, including his landmark work, The Negro In Sports (Washington, DC: Associated Publishers, Inc., 1939). In 1910–1913, Henderson co-authored an annual handbook published by the Spalding sports company, entitled, Official Handbook of the Interscholastic Athletic Association of Middle Atlantic States, which chronicled the birth of organized sports among African Americans along the Eastern seaboard. This publication, which included photographs of African American teams that competed against each other, was the first of its kind. Henderson also contributed regularly through the National Negro Press Association, including such pioneering magazines as The Messenger and Crisis. In 1963 he collaborated with Sports magazine to publish "The Black Athlete—Emergence and Arrival" as part of their International Library of Negro Life and History. His last contribution, sponsored by the Phelps-Stokes Fund, was entitled "The Black American in Sports".

Beyond athletics, Henderson and his wife fought against segregation discrimination in housing and education. Five years after they moved to Virginia, in 1915, the Falls Church town council passed an ordinance to create segregated districts within the town. Henderson, Joseph Tinner and seven other community members, formed the Colored Citizens Protective League, and started a letter writing campaign to address the council and this ordinance. Henderson and his wife were members of the NAACP, in Washington, D.C., so, they also wrote a letter to W. E. B. Du Bois asking permission to start an NAACP chapter in Falls Church, Virginia. The NAACP headquarters advised that the organization had no rural branches. However, they were given permission to operate as a standing committee under the authority of the NAACP; thus formed the Fairfax County branch in 1918. Ironically, although the Hendersons won that initial town council ordinance spat, the council then ceded the Seven Corners area back to Fairfax County (because, Henderson said, "in those days Negroes were Republican"), but decades later unsuccessfully tried to annex it back, after it had become Fairfax County's largest single source of revenue.

Henderson twice served as President of the NAACP's Virginia Council, from 1955 to 1958, the height of Massive Resistance declared by Virginia's political boss (and U.S. Senator) Harry F. Byrd, Sr. after the U.S. Supreme Court decisions in Brown v. Board of Education. In addition to the portions of the Stanley Plan that sought to maintain racial segregation in schools (and that were declared unconstitutional by a three-judge federal panel as well as by the Virginia Supreme Court on January 19, 1959), Virginia Governors Thomas B. Stanley and later J. Lindsay Almond and the Virginia Assembly attempted to harass and dismantle the NAACP in the Commonwealth during Henderson's presidency.

Henderson wrote many letters to the editor, especially after his retirement, to local newspapers in Washington, D.C., and Virginia. He claimed to have had more than 3,000 letters published in over a dozen newspapers. The majority of the letters concerned race relations and sought equality for African Americans in the United States as well as the local Washington, D.C., metropolitan area. The Tinner Hill Heritage Foundation and The Washington Post co-sponsor a "Dear Editor" contest to secondary school aged students in Northern Virginia in his honor.

== Death and legacy ==
Henderson died of cancer in 1977, at his son's home in Tuskegee, Alabama. He survived his wife by one year. They were both cremated and their ashes interred in Woodlawn Cemetery. His papers are held at Howard University's Moorland-Spingarn Research Center.

During his lifetime, Henderson received some recognition, including an elaborate sendoff from his Second Baptist Church of Falls Church when he left for Alabama in 1965. The Fairfax County Council on Human Relations, where he had served as program chairman, gave him a testimonial in 1960. His Falls Church/Fairfax County NAACP branch also celebrated its 50th anniversary shortly before his departure. In 1972, Black Sports magazine cited Henderson as "one of the foremost black Americans of all time." In 1973, Henderson was elected Honorary President of the North American Society for Sport History. In 1974, along with Joe Louis, Jackie Robinson, Jesse Owens, Bill Russell and Althea Gibson, he became an inaugural member of the Black Athletes Hall of Fame.

Posthumously, in 1982, Fairfax County dedicated its Providence Recreation Center in Henderson's honor. In 1985, the City of Tuskegee named a park for E.B. Henderson. In 2002, the City of Falls Church named the Falls Church Community Center gymnasium in his honor. In 2005, the Mary Ellen Henderson Middle School was named after Henderson's wife, because of her fight to bring equality to educational facilities in Fairfax County Public Schools and in Virginia.

In 1999, the Tinner Hill Heritage Foundation erected a pink granite (trondhjemite) archway memorializing the founders of the Colored Citizens Protective League (CCPL) which eventually became the NAACP's first rural branch.

Since 1993, the Annual Tinner Blues Festival has taken place on the second Saturday of June in Falls Church's Cherry Hill Park. Many national and area blues musicians play at the event, which also recognizes Piedmont Blues guitarist/singer John Jackson, who made his home in Northern Virginia.

In 2013, Henderson was inducted posthumously into the Naismith Memorial Basketball Hall of Fame.

In 2018, the Library of Virginia honored Henderson as one of its Strong Men and Women.

In 2022 the University of the District of Columbia renamed building 47 on their campus after Henderson.
