= Mary Ellen Henderson =

African-American educator and civil rights activist

- Born: Mary Ellen Meriwether; September 18, 1885; Washington, D.C.
- Died: February 4, 1976 (aged 90); Washington, D.C.
- Occupation: Teacher
- Known for: Local civil rights leader, NAACP organizer
- Spouse: Edwin Henderson
- Parent(s): James H. Meriwether; Mary L. Robinson

Mary Ellen Henderson (née Meriwether; September 18, 1885 – February 4, 1976) was an African-American educator and civil rights activist in the mid-1900s. She is most famous for her work desegregating living spaces in Falls Church, working to build better facilities for black students in Falls Church, Virginia and starting the CCPL (Colored Citizens Protective League), the first rural branch of the NAACP.

== Early life and family ==
Mary Ellen Meriwether was born in Washington, D.C., on September 18, 1885, to Mary Louise Robinson Meriwether and James Henry Meriwether. Both of her parents had a college education. Her mother, Mary Louise, graduated from Oberlin College in Ohio, went on to teach at the first high school for black students, later known as the Paul Laurence Dunbar High School, in Washington, D.C., and worked as a social activist. Mary Ellen's father, James, graduated from Howard University. He later practiced law in Washington D.C. and served on the board of trustees at Howard until his death in 1906. Her sister, Sarah Meriwether Nutter, was also an educator, activist and a founder of Alpha Kappa Alpha sorority.

== Career and activism ==
Mary Ellen, nicknamed "Miss Nellie" by her students, originally taught grades four through seven at James E. Lee Elementary School, a segregated two-room schoolhouse for black children. She accepted the job to prevent the school from being closed down due to a lack of adequately trained teachers. The school had no running water or custodial staff, so Henderson brought water from a neighbor's well and cleaned the classroom daily. The building also did not have a central heating system or indoor sanitary facilities, resources that the white school did have. Henderson fought for a better school for African-American children, conducting a study on the funding inequalities between black and white schools in Fairfax County, Our Disgrace and Shame: School Facilities for Negro Children in Fairfax County. Henderson was persuasive, and in 1948, Fairfax opened the new James E. Lee Elementary School, a six-room school, complete with the additions of an auditorium, library, clinic, and cafeteria. Henderson was appointed as principal of the new school, a position she held for thirty years. The students Mary Ellen Henderson taught were known for their high achievements, and received praise from their high school teachers. The students she taught would later on become important members of the community, or even teachers themselves.

Henderson and her husband, E. B. Henderson, founded the Colored Citizens’ Protective League (CCPL), alongside Joseph Tinner, to protest segregated neighborhoods. In 1915, a law was passed by white qualified voters in Falls Church that would force the African American population to live in their own section of town; 32% of the population had to live in less than 5% of the land. The CCPL filed a lawsuit that prevented the ordinance from being enforced. The ordinance was nullified in 1917 by the Supreme Court, and officially removed in 1999. The CCPL eventually, in 1918, formed the basis of the Fairfax County Branch of the NAACP, the first rural branch of the NAACP.

Both of the Hendersons were honored in 1960 by the Fairfax County Council on Human Relations for their battle against racial bias. They were also honored by the United States House of Representatives in 2006, when they were recognized in the Congressional Record by Representative Jim Moran, "For every person of national recognition there is a local leader that accomplishes much under the shadow of their more recognized peers. Two of these people are Dr. Edwin and Mrs. Mary Ellen Henderson, civil rights pioneers from Northern Virginia that worked for social justice for nearly 50 years."

=== Our Disgrace and Shame: School Facilities for Negro Children in Fairfax County ===
In 1945, Mary Ellen Henderson composed a study, Our Disgrace and Shame: School Facilities for Negro Children in Fairfax County, on the inequalities between black and white schools in Fairfax County to promote the allocation of more resources for her school. Children at the white schools rode in heated buses to and from school, while students at the black schools took decrepit, non-heated buses, if they lived close enough to take buses at all (some children walked for about five miles every day). The budget for every school in the Fairfax area in 1935 was $340,050. 97.4% of that money ($330,750) was spent on white schools, while only 2.6% ($9,000) was spent on black schools. There was a similar monetary disparity in the 1945–46 school year; the capital outlay budget for white schools was $745,000 about ($13 million today) while the budget for black schools was just a fraction of that, $45,000. Many segregated schools did not get funding for additions such as cafeterias. Five white schools, on the other hand, were funded with anywhere from $10,000 to $50,000 to make additions. Henderson was able to use the disparities outlined in the report to convince the Fairfax County School Board to build the new 6-room schoolhouse and divide funds equally in the future.

== Personal life ==
Mary Ellen Henderson attended the Normal School (now known as The D.C. Teachers College), where she met her lifetime partner, Dr. Edwin Bancroft "E.B." Henderson. He would later become the first black physical education director in a city school system [4] and the president of the Virginia Chapter of the NAACP.

They both graduated at the top of their classes, Mary Ellen in 1905 and Edwin in 1904. The two were married on Christmas Eve, 1910. Nikki, the Hendersons' granddaughter-in-law, recounted: "The year 1910 was a big year for the Hendersons. They married on Christmas Eve day at the 15th Street Presbyterian Church, with E.B. promising his bride he would not play basketball after they were married. The bride and groom headed to New York City to spend their honeymoon weekend, where the groom played his last basketball game, winning the 1910 Colored World Basketball Championship on their wedding night!"

Mary Ellen and E.B. moved to Falls Church in 1911 in what would later be designated an "all-white district." They had two children together while living in Falls Church, Edwin Meriwether Henderson in 1912 and James Henry Meriwether Henderson in 1917.

As a member of the NAACP, Girl Scouts, League of Women Voters, Falls Church Women's Democratic Club, Virginia Education Association, and National Education Association, Henderson was an active member of her community. She was also a lifetime member of the 15th Street Presbyterian Church, although she also taught Sunday school and played the organ at Second Baptist Church in Falls Church City.

In 1965, the Hendersons moved to Tuskegee, Alabama to be closer to their son James, who was the director of the Carver Research Foundation of Tuskegee University. Even after they moved, the Hendersons visited their summer home at Highland Beach near Annapolis, Maryland, where Mary Ellen was an active member in local civic affairs.

== Death and legacy ==
Toward the end of her life, Mary Ellen Henderson moved to the Wisconsin Avenue Nursing Home, where she died on February 4, 1976, aged 90. Her funeral was held on February 7, 1976, at the McGuire Funeral Home. Henderson was cremated and interred at the Meriwether family plot in Woodlawn Cemetery, in Washington, D.C.

Henderson is memorialized by the school that bears her name: Mary Ellen Henderson Middle School in Falls Church City, Virginia. The school was dedicated to her on September 18, 2005, the 120th anniversary of her birth.
