= Andrea L. Taylor =

American academic and civil rights activist (born 1947)

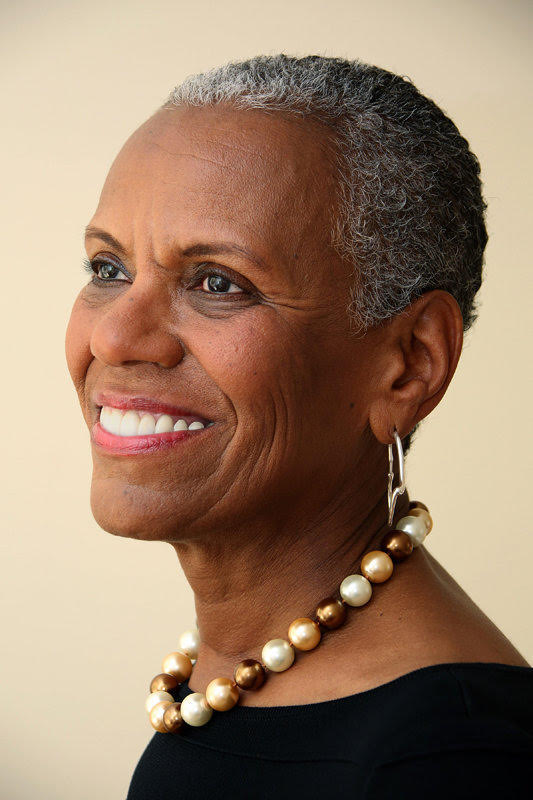
- Born: 1947 (age 78–79)
- Education: Boston University
- Occupations: Senior Diversity Officer, Boston University
- Parent(s): Francis C. Taylor Sr. and Della Brown Taylor Hardman

Andrea L. Taylor (born 1947) is the former Senior Diversity Officer, Boston University, and former president and CEO of the Birmingham Civil Rights Institute part of the Birmingham Civil Rights National Monument (2015–2020). Taylor, former director, Citizenship & Public Affairs, North America at Microsoft Corporation (2006–2014) is a former trustee of Boston University, a current trustee of The HistoryMakers, and an honorary trustee of New York Public Radio, following 22 years as an active board member. Taylor, a former journalist, graduated from the Boston University College of Communication in 1968.

Taylor began her career as a journalist, reporting for The Boston Globe and working as an on-air host for WGBH-TV. Taylor, founding director of the Media Fund at the Ford Foundation, provided production support for documentary film projects about civil rights and social justice worldwide including the award-winning series, Eyes on the Prize. She was also a delegate to four United Nations global summits in Beijing, Geneva, Tunis and Cairo.
