= Mary Robinson Meriwether =

Mary Louise Robinson Meriwether (1848–1942) was an African American activist in Washington, D.C. She was heavily involved in child welfare efforts in Washington, in particular as president of the National Home for the Relief of Destitute Colored Women and Children, which was later renamed in her honor.

== Biography ==
Mary Robinson Meriwether was born in 1848 to a prominent business couple, Robert J. and Sara Wiggins Robinson. Little is known of her mother's heritage, but her father's heritage was documented during his lifetime. Robert's grandfather was the grandson of Thomas Fairfax, 6th Lord Fairfax of Cameron. His mother was the daughter of Captain William S. Neville, brother of Joseph Neville Jr. As they lived as African Americans, it is presumed that one or more relatives on both sides were of African ancestry. Mary was raised as one of eight children the couple had together, and she graduated from Oberlin College in 1870. Mary at the end of her life was recognized as one of the institution's earliest Black graduates, the oldest living member of her 1870 class, and the eldest member of Alpha Kappa Alpha sorority until her death in 1942.

Once she graduated from Oberlin, she was appointed to the faculty of the first Black high school in Washington, where she taught until her marriage to James H. Meriwether, who practiced law in the District of Columbia. Mary Meriwether was active in religious, cultural, and civic life in Washington. As two of the founders of the Fifteenth Street Presbyterian Church, she and her husband served on nearly every committee. They also helped to secure home rental and ownership for other African American families in the DC area. She and her husband raised five children, who all became civic servants in their own rights: Robert H. Meriwether, Agnes Meriwether Brownley, Mary E. Meriwether Henderson, Sarah Meriwether Nutter, and Edith Meriwether Washington Shehee.

Her chief interest was the development and maintenance of the National Home for the Relief of Destitute Colored Women and Children, established by an Act of Congress in 1863.

In 1917, a movement was launched to take away this institution from those in authority. Meriwether appeared before a United States Congressional Committee, and the continued existence of this organization was due largely to her efforts. When the Young Men's Christian Association was organized in Washington, she served as president of the Women's Auxiliary.

Soon after her affiliation with Alpha Kappa Alpha Sorority, she presented this organization with the table that was used in negotiating the establishment of Howard University and gave her consent to have the table presented to the university. She was also an initial charter member of the Xi Omega chapter of AKA.
