= Sarah Meriwether Nutter =

American educator and sorority founder (1888–1950)

- Born: Sarah Meriwether; January 1, 1888; Washington, D.C., U.S.
- Died: April 10, 1950 (aged 62); Charleston, West Virginia, U.S.
- Resting place: Woodlawn Cemetery; Washington, D.C., U.S.
- Occupation: Educationist
- Known for: founder of Alpha Kappa Alpha
- Spouse: T. Gillis Nutter (m. 1920)

Sarah Meriwether Nutter (January 1, 1888 – May 10, 1950) was one of the original sixteen founders of the Alpha Kappa Alpha sorority, the first sorority founded by African-American women. As an educator, she worked in the profession considered most critical to the advancement of African-American citizens.

Nutter was active in creating new chapters of Alpha Kappa Alpha, to extend the support the sorority could give to African-American women at college and in community life. She was also active in the NAACP in Charleston, West Virginia.

== Early life ==
She was born in 1888 in Washington, D.C., the daughter of James H. Meriwether and Mary L. Robinson. Her siblings included Mary E. Meriwether.

She attended public schools and graduated in 1906 from M Street High School (later renamed Dunbar High School), the academic or college preparatory high school for black students in the capital.

== Founding of Alpha Kappa Alpha ==
Sarah Meriwether was accepted into Howard University in 1906, the top historically black college in the nation. She was among 1/3 of 1% of African Americans and 5% of whites of eligible age who attended any college at that time.

An honor student, Meriwether majored in English and history. In 1909, Meriwether, together with six other sophomores, was invited to be one of the founders in Alpha Kappa Alpha Sorority, Incorporated. This was the first sorority to be founded by African-American women.

== Career and later life ==
After graduation, Sarah Meriwether did additional study at Miner Teacher's College. By 1915, she worked as an English teacher at Baltimore's Teacher Training School.

Later Meriwether taught at both Howard University and Washington, D.C.'s Dunbar High School, an academic high school that attracted outstanding teachers. As the District was run as part of the Federal government, African-American teachers in the public schools were part of the civil service and paid on the same scale as whites. The Dunbar High School had very high standards.

In December 1920, Meriwether moved to Charleston, West Virginia, where she met and married T. Gillis Nutter, an attorney and state representative in the West Virginia Legislature. In Charleston, Sarah became active in civic organizations: she was on the Education and Program Committees of the NAACP, organized the Kanawha County's College Alumni Club, and was a member of Charleston's Book Lovers Club. She was the first African American to join the West Virginia Society for Crippled Children.

Nutter along with her Soror Mother Mary L Robinson Meriwether arranged for donation to Howard University of the table where Gen. Oliver O. Howard signed the charter that created the college. She established Alpha Kappa Alpha chapters, such as Nu Chapter at West Virginia State University in 1922. Nutter was one of the charter members of Beta Beta Omega in Charleston. Nutter died on May 10, 1950, aged 62 years, in Charleston. She was buried in Woodlawn Cemetery in Washington, D.C.
