= Last antecedent rule =

The last antecedent rule is a controversial rule for interpreting statutes and contracts. The rule is that "Referential and qualifying phrases, where no contrary intention appears, refer solely to the last antecedent." There are examples of judges both applying and rejecting use of the rule under similar facts. The rule is typically bound by "common sense" and is flexible enough to avoid application that "would involve an absurdity, do violence to the plain intent of the language, or if the context for other reason requires a deviation from the rule."

Further qualifications have been noted to application of the rule:

The Rule of the Last Antecedent is often cited as gospel to courts in statutory construction disputes, with little reference to its origins and the caveats set forth by its primary originator. While courts invoked the principle previously, it was Jabez Gridley Sutherland, a noted attorney, legislator, judge and politician, who in 1891 in his influential treatise stated, “Relative and qualifying words and phrases, grammatically and legally, where no contrary intention appears, refer solely to the last antecedent.” J. Sutherland, Statutes and Statutory Construction, § 420 (1891) (footnote citations omitted). Sutherland, however, qualified his proposed rule. He noted, “[i]t is better always to adhere to a plain, common-sense interpretation of the words of a statute than to apply to them a refined and technical grammatical construction. It is not always safe to assume that the draftsman of an act understood the rules of grammar.” Id. § 259. “Qualifying words have been applied to several preceding sections where the nature of the provisions and the obvious sense required it.” Id. § 267. He noted further that where there is “improbability of a contrary design[,]… an independent proposition” may apply alike to all antecedents which are of the “same class.” See id. (applying the principle to “officers”). Thus, “[w]here the intention is manifest, a proviso … when inserted in one section … may be applied to the matter of another section.” Id.

An alternate and more formulaic approach to the rule requires, inflexibly, that "Evidence that a qualifying phrase is supposed to apply to all antecedents instead of only to the immediately preceding one may be found in the fact that it is separated from the antecedents by a comma." Kenneth A. Adams, author of A Manual of Style for Contract Drafting, has criticized this canon of construction and rigid approach as being applied inconsistently and contrary to the guidance of many manuals of style:

Manuals of style recognize that the comma is used to indicate a slight break in a sentence. But according to the Rule of the Last Antecedent, adding a comma after a series of antecedents not only doesn't sever the modifier from the last noun or phrase in the series, it in fact operates remotely on all the antecedents, binding them to the modifier. Nothing in the general literature on punctuation suggests such a mechanism.

“A contrary rule of construction is that when a clause follows several words in a statute and is applicable as much to the first word as to the others in the list, the clause should be applied to all of the words which preceded it.”

== See also ==
=== Rules of law ===
- Four corners

=== Grammar rules ===
- Possessive antecedent
- Syntax
