= T. Gillis Nutter =

American politician (1876–1959)

T. Gillis Nutter, first elected to the West Virginia Legislature in 1918.

Thomas Gillis Nutter (1876–1959) was an attorney, businessman, and politician in Charleston, West Virginia, United States. Nutter is best remembered as a pioneer African-American member of the West Virginia Legislature, gaining election in 1918 and re-election in 1920 from an overwhelmingly white district, at a time when state disenfranchisement of blacks across the South had resulted in the exclusion of most blacks from statewide politics.

Nutter was active in the NAACP, serving as president for the West Virginia chapter in 1929, and in black fraternal organizations. In that role, Nutter was instrumental in bringing a suit in 1929 that ended the racial segregation of public libraries in West Virginia. In 1929, Nutter was admitted to the American Bar Association, although it officially barred African Americans. In 1948, he won a ruling from a federal court that the city of Montgomery, West Virginia's segregation of its public pool was unconstitutional; without the funds to build a second pool to provide equal access, the city closed its pool for 14 years rather than open it to blacks. "It was the first substantial victory for black Americans fighting swimming pool discrimination in the courts." The case aided the NAACP in its litigation of related pool cases in other parts of the country.

== Early years ==
T. Gillis Nutter was born on June 15, 1876, in Princess Anne, on the rural Eastern Shore of Maryland. His parents were William Nutter and Emma (Henry) Nutter. His paternal grandparents were Virginia and Caleb Nutter, and on the maternal side his grandparents were Peter and Julia Henry. He had a younger brother Isaac Henry (1878–1959), whom he called "Ike", and two younger sisters, Julia and Hattie.

The boys attended the segregated public schools in Maryland. Gillis, as he was known, showed an early interest in the law and jurisprudence. He attended Howard University, an historically black university in Washington, D.C., from which he graduated with a law degree in 1899. His brother Ike followed him to Howard and also obtained a law degree.

After that Ike moved to Atlantic City, New Jersey, setting up a law practice in 1905 as the first African-American attorney in the city. He had numerous cases and a high reputation as a criminal defense lawyer.

Nutter's father died shortly after Gillis graduated. He returned to Maryland to support his mother. During this period he was appointed to a position as principal of a school in Fairmount. He served in this position for two academic years, leaving in June 1901.

In the summer of 1901, Nutter began preparing to resume his career as a lawyer. Because of segregation in Maryland, he moved to another state to be admitted to the Bar. He was admitted at Marion County, Indiana, on November 13, 1901.

Nutter relocated to Charleston, West Virginia, the capital of the state, to open a legal office. His mother moved with him. He built his practice as an attorney serving several large firms in the city. As his stature grew in the community, Nutter became actively involved in the organization of the Mutual Savings and Loan Company of Charleston, at the time the only African American-owned bank in the state.

After a time Nutter took a position with the West Virginia State Auditor's office as an Assistant Land Clerk. He worked there for a total of six years. In 1915 Nutter was the author of a bill introduced into and passed by the West Virginia legislature, which amended the state's tax laws.

== Political career ==
Nutter had joined the Republican Party, which, as the party of President Abraham Lincoln and emancipation, had been supported by most blacks in West Virginia and other parts of the South since after the Civil War. He ran in 1918 in the primary election as a Republican candidate for the West Virginia state legislature. Nutter's candidacy was actively supported by former Governor George W. Atkinson and other leaders of the West Virginia Republican political establishment. Nutter won election in November by a margin of 1,388 votes over his Democratic opponent. He won by a large majority and his district was less than 10 percent black.

Nutter was re-elected to a second two-year term in November 1920. He served on the House Judiciary Committee during his second term. Among the issues he supported were the construction of state institutions to assist African Americans: an insane asylum, and an Industrial School for Colored Boys and an Industrial Home for Colored Girls. Due to disenfranchisement of most blacks across the South at the turn of the century, Nutter was at the time virtually the only black elected to statewide office in the region. This situation would continue well into the 1960s and after passage of civil rights legislation by Congress.

In 1928, Nutter's favorite brother Ike, an attorney who had been prominent as a leader in the Republican Party in Atlantic City, New Jersey, shifted to the Democratic Party to support Governor Al Smith against Herbert Hoover. Gillis Nutter was disappointed, saying the two brothers had been the closest among their siblings. The Democratic Party was important in the Northeast in mobilizing new urban populations including many black migrants and European immigrants.

In 1929, Nutter, as head of the West Virginia section of the National Association for the Advancement of Colored Persons was instrumental in the desegregation of the state's public libraries. Upon hearing complaints that black citizens were being denied admission to public libraries, Nutter and fellow black attorney C. E. Kimbrough filed a writ of error with the West Virginia Supreme Court of Appeals. The court agreed with the plaintiffs that public libraries were not schools and were not subject to existing Jim Crow "separate but equal" rules.

Also in 1929, Nutter was admitted to the American Bar Association, although it generally excluded blacks. He continued to have a successful law practice. In the late 1930s, he "represented white business interests in a land deal worth $12 million."

In 1947, Nutter brought suit in federal court in a civil rights case to gain integration of a public pool in Montgomery, West Virginia. He chose the federal court in the hopes of getting a fair hearing and also, if victorious, to gain a ruling that would benefit blacks in other places in the country. The federal court ruled in Lawrence v. Hancock (1948) that the municipality was trying to avoid the state civil rights law that required equal access and, if it provided a pool for whites it must also provide one for blacks. Unable to afford a second pool and unwilling to integrate the existing one, the city of Montgomery closed the pool and kept it closed until 1961. "It was the first substantial victory for black Americans fighting swimming pool discrimination in the courts." The case and its principle aided the national office of the NAACP in litigating other swimming pool cases.

== Associations, personal and political ==
On December 18, 1920, Nutter had married Sarah Meriwether Nutter, a fellow Howard University graduate and teacher born in Washington, D.C. In 1909 while in college, she had been one of the founding members of Alpha Kappa Alpha, the nation's first sorority by and for African Americans.

The Nutters attended First Baptist Church in Charleston, a black congregation that was founded in 1868. According to an article on successful West Virginia blacks which he published in The Messenger in 1924, Nutter was teaching a Men's Sunday School at the church that year.

Nutter was active in a number of fraternal orders. In 1913 he was elected the national leader of the Improved Benevolent and Protective Order of Elks of the World. Nutter served a one-year term as the order's "Grand Exalted Ruler," during which time he was credited for creating and reinstating more local lodges than at any time since a merger of the organization in 1910.

Nutter believed in promoting the success of African Americans in West Virginia. In 1924 he published an article in The Messenger on West Virginia blacks as part of their series, "These 'Colored' United States," published from January 1923 through September 1926. His article featured the lives of 28 successful blacks, both male and female: business owners, professionals and educators, including his wife. He provided data on property owned crops produced, as well as other material on businesses.

In 1928 Nutter served as the West Virginia state head of the Knights of Pythias of North America, South America, Europe, Asia, Africa and Australia, another black fraternal association.

== Death and legacy ==
Nutter died in Charleston on June 23, 1959. At the time of his death, he was living on 304 Elizabeth Street in the city's East End. He was buried at the Woodlawn Cemetery in Washington, D.C., on June 26, 1959.

Nutter was noted for being elected in a time of few elected black officials in the South. He gained integration of public libraries while president of the state chapter of the NAACP.

From 1959 on, the West Virginia Conference of NAACP Branches began to give the TG Nutter Award as one of its highest awards.
