= Colored Citizens Protective League =

African-American civil rights organization founded in 1915

The Colored Citizens Protective League (CCPL) was established in Falls Church, Virginia in 1915 to advocate against proposed town ordinances to restrict areas where African Americans could live. It went on to become the first rural NAACP branch.

== History ==
Founded in 1915 by Joseph Tinner, Edwin B. Henderson and other African American community leaders, the Colored Citizens Protective League was organized to combat racial segregation in Falls Church. Following a law passed in 1912 by the Virginia legislature giving cities and towns the right to racially segregate residents, Falls Church adopted ordinances in 1915 restricting where African American could live and own property. Set to become effective in 1916, the restricted areas included areas where African Americans already lived and owned homes which would require some to relocate.

The CCPL protested the ordinance and submitted petitions signed by both African American and white residents, business owners and church leaders. They also sought assistance from W.E.B. DuBois and the NAACP, then a young organization. Eventually the CCPL filed lawsuits but were unsuccessful. They continued their efforts to delay enforcement until such ordinances became unconstitutional due to the 1917 Supreme Court decision in the Buchanan v. Warley case, ruling states and municipalities could not create segregation districts.

In 1918 the CCPL became the first rural NAACP branch, with thirty-five members. Tinner was President and Henderson Secretary.

In 1937, the organization became the Fairfax County branch of the NAACP.

== Legacy ==
A handwritten note from the group's 1915 meeting is extant and a historical marker commemorates its history.

== See also ==
- Tinner Hill
- National Independent Political League
