= Anderson Hunt Brown =

African-American real estate entrepreneur and civil rights activist from West Virginia

A. H. Brown
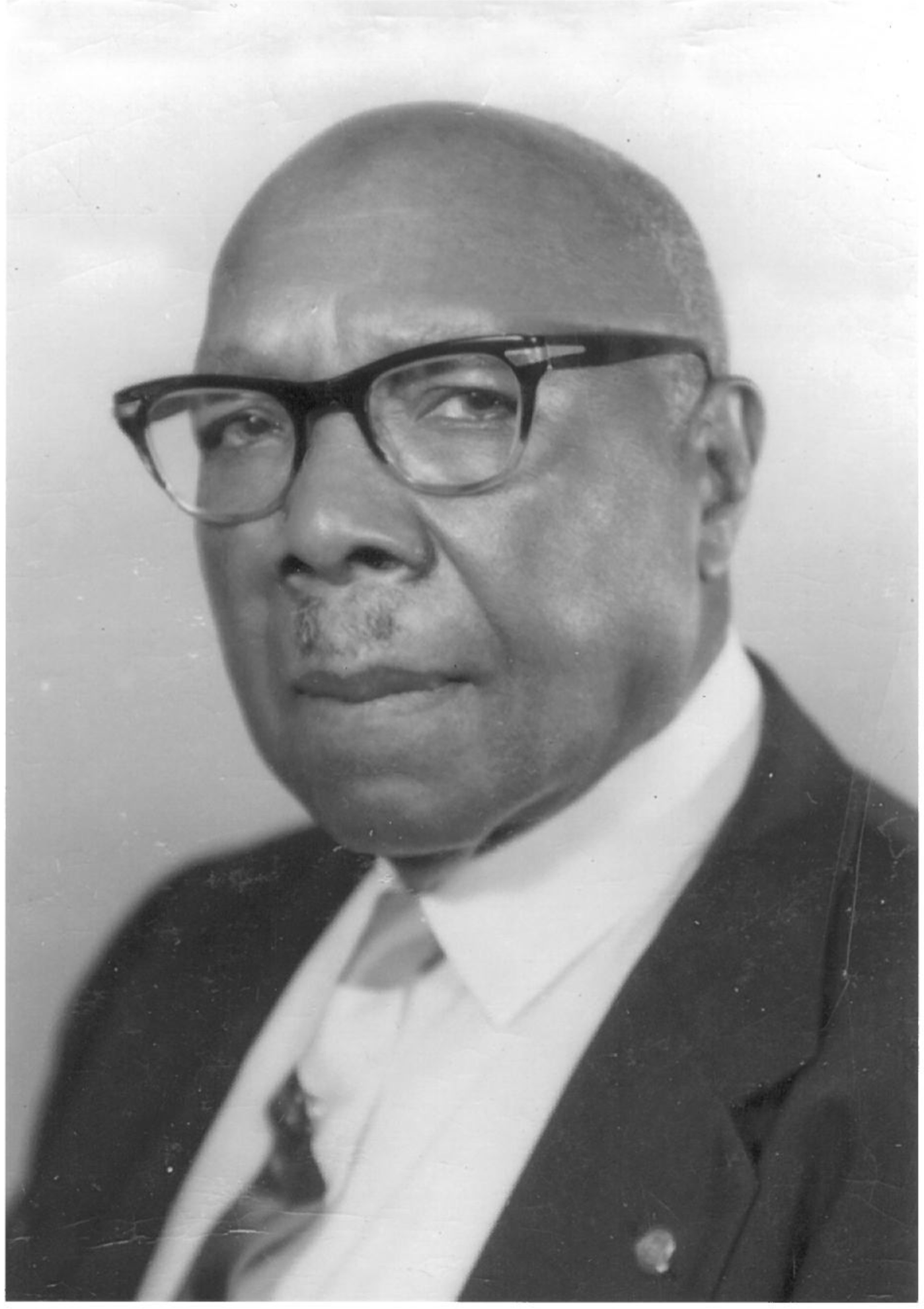
- Born: Anderson Hunt Brown; April 23, 1880; Charleston, West Virginia, U.S
- Died: October 24, 1974 (aged 94); Charleston, West Virginia, U.S
- Occupation: Entrepreneur
- Children: Willard L. Brown, Della Brown Taylor Hardman
- Parent(s): Henry Arnold Brown and Margaret Stewart Brown

Anderson Hunt Brown (1880 – 1974) was an American businessman, real-estate developer, and civil rights activist.

As a very successful African-American man in West Virginia, A.H. Brown worked on behalf of citizens and residents of the Charleston Independent School District for the integration of public schools. In a lawsuit titled Brown vs. Board of Education (1928)—with NAACP lawyer T. G. Nutter representing Brown and others—the West Virginia Supreme Court desegregated the Charleston library.

Anderson's son, Willard L. Brown, became the first black judge in West Virginia and represented the state chapter of the NAACP in a case of racial discrimination in public schools. That filing became part of the historic U.S. Supreme Court school desegregation ruling in 1954.

== Personal life ==
Anderson Hunt Brown was born in 1880 in Dunbar, West Virginia. His parents, Henry Arnold Brown and Margaret Stewart Brown, were former slaves who were freed in 1865 and located in an area known as Dutch Holler, now part of present-day Dunbar.

As a teenager, Brown learned to play trombone and traveled to Cincinnati and other cities with his brothers in their band, "Uncle Tom’s Cabin," netting $10 a week (about $300 today) for their performances. Upon returning to Charleston, he learned how to cut meat and opened a butcher shop and adjoining restaurant.

Brown fathered two children. His son, Willard L. Brown, finished his Master's degree in law in 1936 and became an attorney. His daughter, Della Brown Taylor Hardman, was an artist who graduated with a master's in fine arts in 1945 and became a professor at West Virginia State University.

== Career ==
Several years after running his butcher shop, Brown took a real-estate investing course in Boston, Massachusetts, and used his earnings to purchase a house at 1219 Washington Street, next to Charleston High School.

Brown—in partnership with Gurnett E. Ferguson, who built the Ferguson Hotel (an African American hotel, theater, and place of business) on Washington Street—constructed a building during the middle to late 1920s adjoining the Ferguson Hotel, called the Brown Building. The thriving area around his properties became known as "The Block" — a residential, social, economic, educational, and religious center of the African-American population of the city during the Jim Crow era and segregation, as well as the home for other ethnic groups.

In the 1960s, a fire partially destroyed the Ferguson Hotel. As a result, Gurnett Ferguson sold to another hotel business. A second Brown Building located on Shrewsbury Street was built and completed in 1971, with work on the building being done entirely by African-American businesses, contractors, and sub-contractors. For a few years before his death in 1974, Brown maintained an office in the new building, along with his son and daughter. Other offices have included a barber shop, doctor's office, real estate office, and some government offices.

In addition to his commercial properties, Brown bought land around Charleston, West Virginia, to build houses, which he rented affordably to black community members. When Brown's children attended Boston University for their graduate degrees, Brown bought three properties in Cambridge, Massachusetts. As housing was not provided to black students, Brown allowed his children to live in one house, and rented out the others to their black classmates.

== Brown v Board of Education (1928) ==
The city of Charleston had previously maintained a separate library for African-American citizens.

Partnering with the Charleston WV branch of the NAACP, Brown would initiate a lawsuit against the Kanawha County Board of Education and the Kanawha Public Library for denying African Americans access to the library. This was instigated after an incident on March 13, 1928, where three African American residents of Kanawha County were refused admittance to the public library; they were refused the books, papers and magazines, and the right to sit in the library.

Originally brought before the Circuit Court in Kanawha County, the Circuit judge ruled that the Board was within its rights in providing separate libraries. Brown and the lawyers then took the case to the West Virginia Supreme Court of Appeals, in a lawsuit titled Brown vs. Board of Education of Charleston Independent School District (1928).

Represented by NAACP lawyer T. G. Nutter, Brown, along with E. L. Powell and W. W. Sanders, successfully brought the Supreme Court to desegregate the Charleston library. The Court said that taxpayers’ money could not be used for a main library and exclude Black taxpayers.

== See also ==
- Philip A. Payton Jr.
- Jesse Binga
