= Fairfax Circuit Court =

Judicial court in Fairfax, Virginia

The Fairfax Circuit Court of the 19th Judicial Circuit, is a court of general jurisdiction, serving the County and City of Fairfax, Virginia, in the United States. It is the largest trial court in Virginia and handles both civil and criminal cases. The Court comprises fifteen full-time judges.

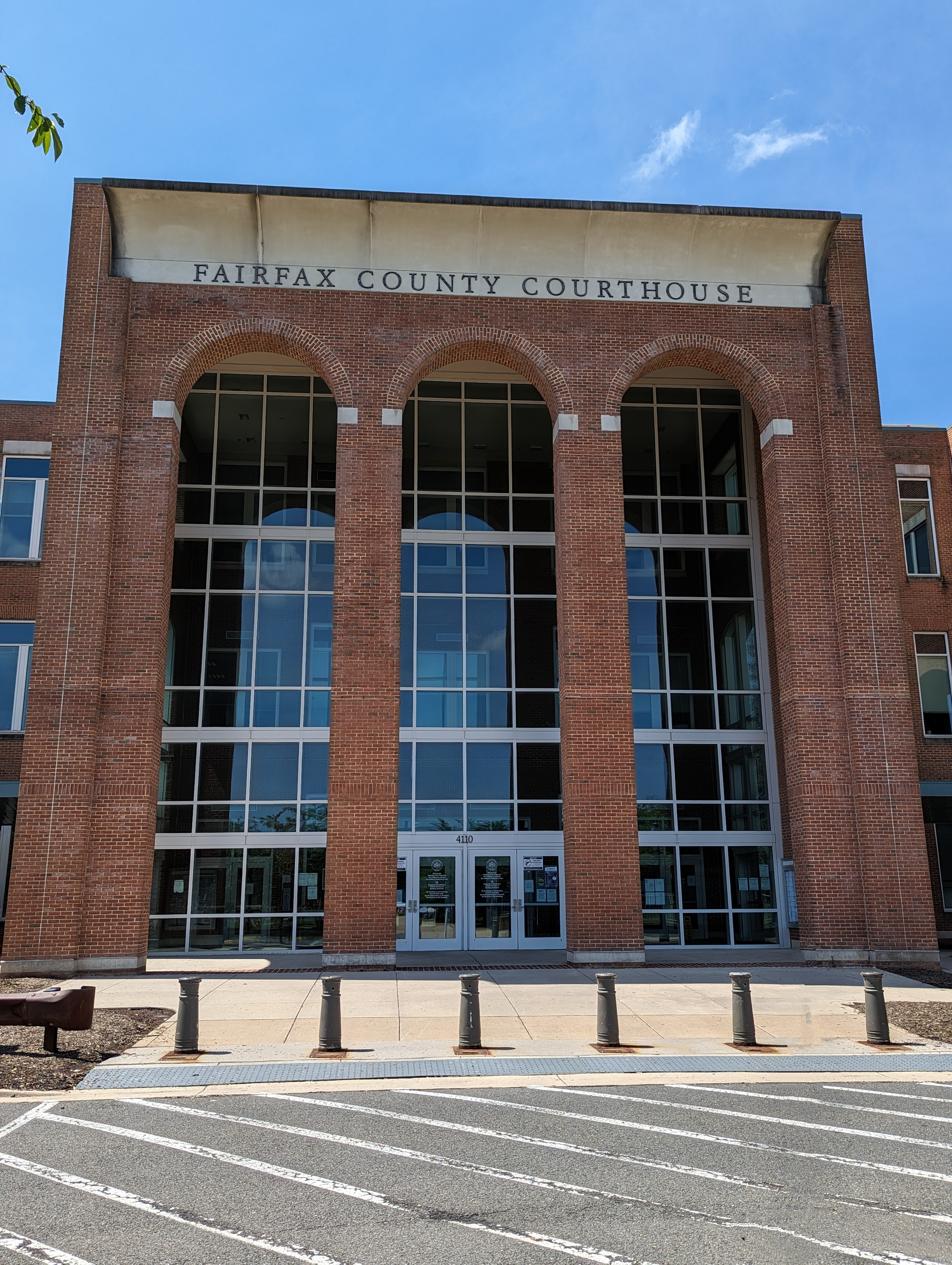
Fairfax Courthouse main entrance

== History ==
The Fairfax Circuit Court's roots date to 1742 when Fairfax County was established. The old courthouse, constructed in 1799, played a central role in the county's legal and administrative activities.

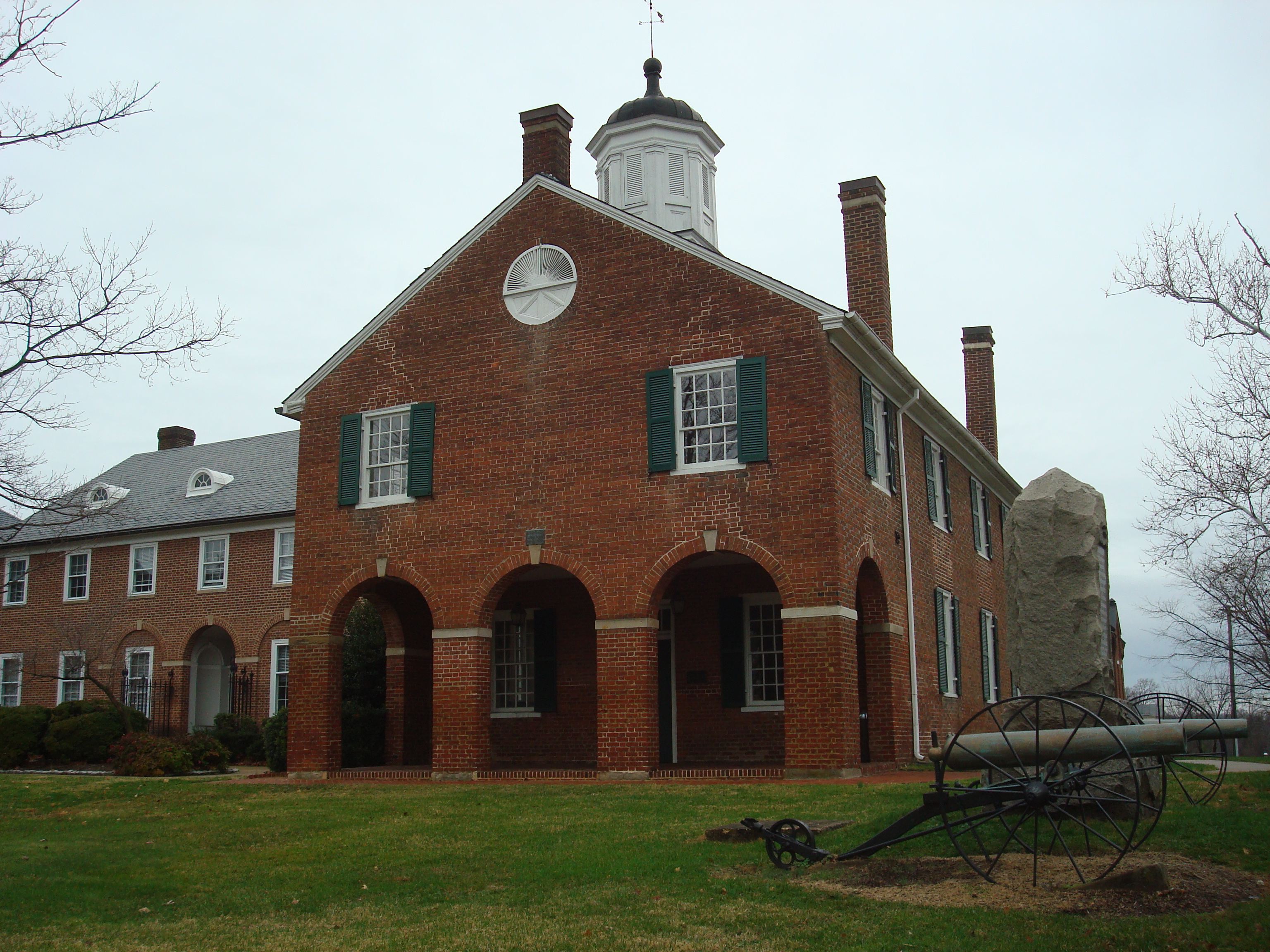
Old Courthouse

From its inception, the Court became a central hub for the county's governmental and social activities. The early court cases, often reflecting the social norms and conflicts of the time, included everything from property disputes to public punishments. The Court, like many Southern courts before the Civil War, was involved in the enforcement of slavery laws in Virginia. The Court's responsibilities included adjudicating disputes involving enslaved individuals, overseeing the sale and transfer of enslaved people, and handling cases of runaway slaves. Court records from the period reveal numerous cases where enslaved individuals were the subject of legal disputes, reflecting the harsh realities of their lives.

The Historic Records Center houses George and Martha Washington's wills and the Slavery Index.

A new judicial center was constructed in the 1980s. This facility provided the necessary space and resources for more efficient court operations, accommodating the growing demands of the county's population. The courthouse was significantly expanded and upgraded in 2008–09.

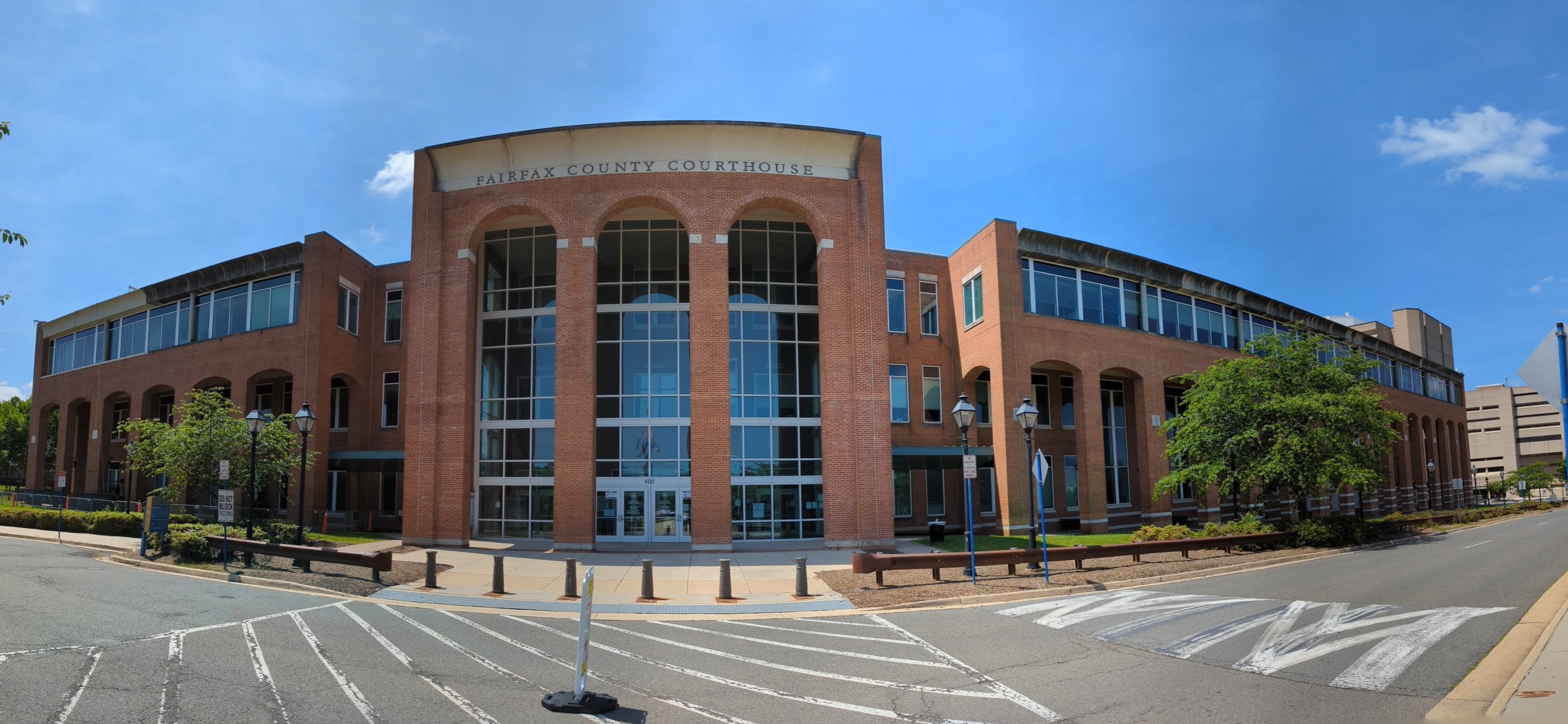
Fairfax Courthouse today in panorama view

In recent decades, the Fairfax Circuit Court has incorporated technological advancements to improve access to justice. This includes electronic filing systems, digital record-keeping, and virtual hearings. The Court has also implemented drug and veteran treatment dockets, to address specific societal issues through tailored judicial interventions.

On August 14, 2020, the fifteen judges of the Court adopted a landmark plan to promote racial equality, diversity in qualified candidates for appointment as sub-judges, and other measures to enhance public confidence in the fairness of the Fairfax Circuit Court.

== Clerk of the Court ==
The Clerk of the Fairfax Circuit Court's responsibilities include managing the court's records, overseeing the administration of probate and land records, issuing marriage licenses, and providing clerical assistance to the judges in both civil and criminal cases.

Christopher J. Falcon was the first Hispanic Clerk of the Fairfax Circuit Court, elected to the position November 7, 2023, and took office on January 1, 2024.

== Slavery index ==
The Fairfax Circuit Court's historical preservation includes the Fairfax Circuit Court Slavery Index. This index documents records from the early 1700s to the 1860s that reference enslaved individuals, including probate documents like wills, trusts, deeds of gift, and estate settlements. Housed in the Court's Historic Records Center, the project aims to provide comprehensive data for genealogical and historical research.

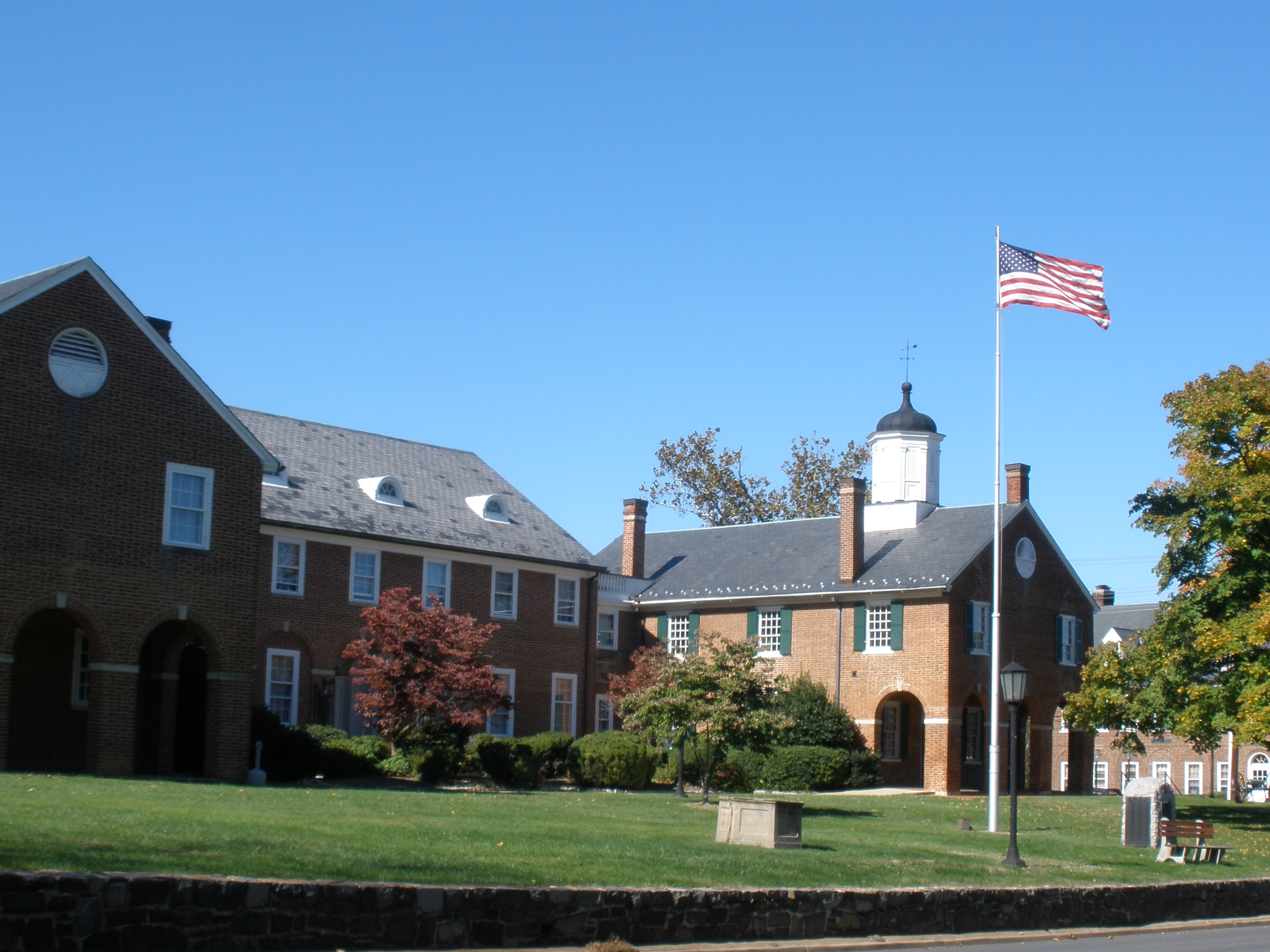
Historic Records Center and Old Courthouse
