= Frank Walser =

American builder (1924–1996)

Raymond Frank Walser (June 6, 1924 – June 10, 1996), commonly known as Frank Walser, was an American builder who operated in the Raleigh, North Carolina area from 1949 into the 1980s.

Born in Tyro, North Carolina, Walser was an engineering graduate from North Carolina State College. He "was willing and able to employ techniques and materials that were alien to building traditions in the Raleigh area", and built numerous Frank Lloyd Wright- and Mies van der Rohe-inspired houses designed by faculty of the School of Design at North Carolina State University.

Walser built in Raleigh all except one of the homes designed by George Matsumoto. Mostly known for his houses, Walser also built several churches and an architectural offices building.

A number of his works are listed on the National Register of Historic Places. Works include (with attribution):

- Fadum House, 3056 Granville Dr., Raleigh, North Carolina (Walser, Frank A.), NRHP-listed
- Matsumoto House, 821 Runnymeade Rd., Raleigh, North Carolina (Walser, Frank), NRHP-listed
- George Poland House, 502 John Jones Rd., Bahama, North Carolina (Walser, Raymond Frank), NRHP-listed
- Ritcher House, 3039 Churchill Rd., Raleigh, North Carolina (Walser, Frank), NRHP-listed
- Mae and Philip Rothstein House, 912 Williamson Dr., Raleigh, North Carolina (Walser, Frank), NRHP-listed
- Small House, 310 Lake Boone Trail, Raleigh, North Carolina (Walser, Frank), NRHP-listed
- G. Milton Small and Associates Office Building, 105 Brooks Ave., Raleigh, North Carolina (Walser, Frank), NRHP-listed

== See also ==
- Ulrich and Anton Walser, builders in Wisconsin of NRHP-listed houses
