= Music Pavilion =

Music Pavilion may refer to the following venues:

- Music Pavilion (Orion, Illinois), listed on the National Register of Historic Places
- Grandview Park Music Pavilion, in Sioux City, Iowa
- Oleson Park Music Pavilion, in Fort Dodge, Iowa
- PNC Music Pavilion in Charlotte, North Carolina
- Pritzker Music Pavilion, in Cook County, Illinois
- Walmart Arkansas Music Pavilion, in Rogers, Arkansas
- Waterfront Music Pavilion, or Freedom Mortgage Pavilion in Camden, New Jersey
