= Jon Condoret =

American architect

Jon Andre Condoret
- Born: September 5, 1934; Algiers, Algeria
- Died: August 8, 2010 (aged 76); Pittsboro, North Carolina
- Occupation: Architect
- Website: ncmodernist.org/condoret.htm

Jon Andre Condoret (French: Jean André Condoret, September 5, 1934, in Algiers, Algeria – August 8, 2010, in Fearrington Village, North Carolina) was a French American architect who infused North Carolina modernist architecture with European sensibility. Along with the works by Harwell Hamilton Harris, Henry L. Kamphoefner, Eduardo Catalano, George Matsumoto and others, Condoret's designs define the architectural demeanor of a U.S. state that has the fourth largest concentration of modernist houses after California, New York and Florida. According to his daughter, architect Arielle Schechter, Condoret's architecture brings “the natural world into homes,” embraces “the principles of passive solar design,” and uses “textures and materials in delightfully surprising ways.”

== Life, education and career ==
Condoret studied at L'École Spéciale d'Architecture in Paris from 1955 to 1959, where he received his diploma in 1959. In 1962, he and his wife and children fled the Algerian Revolution. After fleeing Algeria, Condoret worked for Archie Royal Davis (1907–1980) from then until 1967. In 1967 he worked as Winn/Condoret Architects with partner Louis Sumner Winn, Jr. (1928–2000). Before finally going out on his own, Condoret worked for Don Eugene (Don) Stewart (1926–2012) at City Planning and Architecture Associates (CPAA). After these three first jobs, Condoret designed modern buildings in North Carolina, especially in Chapel Hill, NC and Chatham County. He was senior architect for Fearrington Village in Chatham County, and is responsible for a lot of the buildings there. Condoret died on August 8, 2010, in his house in Fearrington Village.

== Buildings and projects ==
- The Jon Condoret House, Chapel Hill, NC (1965)
- The Charles B. and Kathryn P. Huestis House, Durham, NC (1986)
- The Linda and Allan Kornberg Residence, Durham, NC (1969)
- The Albert and Sedrid Nelius Residence, Durham, NC (1969)
- The Athos and Anna D. Ottolenghi Residence, Durham, NC (1970)
- The George S. and Alice Welsh House, Chapel Hill (1970)
- The Mary S. Anderson Residence, Chapel Hill, NC (1972; renovated by Actual Size Builders in 2018)
- The Richard and Pat Hughes House, Durham, NC (1972)
- The Robert and Jane Parr Residence, Chapel Hill, NC (1972)
- The Saul M. and Rachel Schanberg Residence, Chapel Hill, NC (1972)
- The Cal and Roz Kovens Residence, Chapel Hill, NC (1973)
- The Donald and Barbara Moore Residence, Durham, NC (1973)
- The L. Arthur and Florence Larson Residence, Durham, NC (1973)
- The Javad and Mina Vakilzadeh Residence, Chapel Hill, NC (1975)
- The Raymond and Mary Mulligan Residence, Durham, NC (1975)
- The Bill Carlton Terry Residence, Chapel Hill, NC (1976)
- The Arie and Anita Lewin Residence, Chapel Hill, NC (1976)
- The Robert S. and Bryna Gilgor House, Chapel Hill, NC (1976)
- The Ronald and Dorothy Baker House, Chapel Hill, NC (1977)
- The Eric L. and Barbara B. Effman Residence, Chapel Hill, NC (1978)
- The Richard C. and Elizabeth Morey Residence, Chapel Hill, NC (1979)
- The Richard and Ann Shachtman House, Chapel Hill, NC (1979)
- The James D. and Kathleen D. Crapo Residence, Durham, NC (1980)
- The James and Frances Davis Residence, Chapel Hill, NC (1981)
- The Christopher S. and Lisa Best Residence, Pittsboro, NC (1981)
- The Allen and Marcia Roses House, Durham, NC (1982)
- The Larry Sumney Residence, Chapel Hill, NC (1983)
- The Len and Beatrice Prosnitz Residence, Chapel Hill, NC (1984)
- The Ernest and Mildred Mario House, One Friday Lane, Chapel Hill (1985)
- The Lowell and Mary Elizabeth King Residence, Durham, NC (1985)
- The James and Susan Bernstein Residence, Chapel Hill, NC (1986)
- The Cliff and Linda Butler House, Chapel Hill, NC (1986)
- The John K. Kittredge Residence, Chapel Hill, NC (1987)
- The Steven and Laura Maier Residence, Chapel Hill, NC (1987)
- The Stanley Levy Residence, Chapel Hill, NC (1987)
- The John T. Ward and Pamela Whitney House, Raleigh, NC (1987)
- The Anna R. Hayes Residence, Hillsborough, NC (1988)
- The D. Michael Warner and Elizabeth (Betty) B. Craven Residence, Durham, NC (1989)
- The Sheldon and Doren Pinnell Residence, Durham, NC (1989)
- The Jean S. and William H. Glaze House, Hillsborough (1990)
- The Rudy Y. Riggs and James (Jim) Phillips House, Hurdle Mills, NC (1990)
- The Mark LeFebre House, Chapel Hill, NC (1990)
- The Patricia Pukkila and Gordon Worley House, Chapel Hill, NC (1995)
- The Robert and Sharon Glass House, Pittsboro, NC (2002)

The Christine and Ken Kehrer residence, Fearrington Village, NC 2009, believed to be has last design
