= Willie P. Mangum =

American politician and planter (1792–1861)

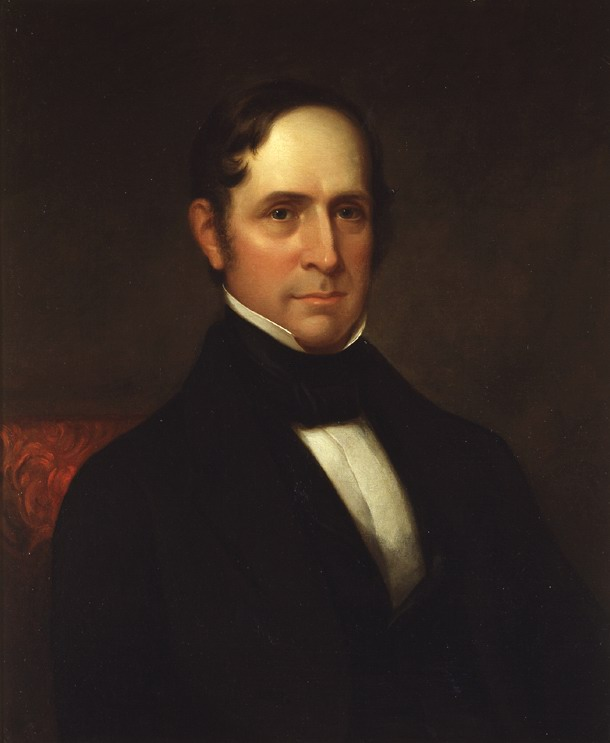
- 1844 portrait by James Lambdin

President pro tempore of the United States Senate
- In office May 31, 1842 – March 3, 1845
- Preceded by: Samuel L. Southard
- Succeeded by: Ambrose Hundley Sevier (acting)

United States Senator from North Carolina
- In office November 25, 1840 – March 3, 1853
- Preceded by: Bedford Brown
- Succeeded by: David Reid
- In office March 4, 1831 – November 26, 1836
- Preceded by: James Iredell Jr.
- Succeeded by: Robert Strange

Member of the U.S. House of Representatives from North Carolina's 8th district
- In office March 4, 1823 – March 18, 1826
- Preceded by: Josiah Crudup
- Succeeded by: Daniel Barringer

Personal details
- Born: May 10, 1792 Orange County, North Carolina, U.S. (now Durham County)
- Died: September 7, 1861 (aged 69) Bahama, Durham County, North Carolina, Confederate States of America
- Resting place: Mangum family cemetery Walnut Hall
- Party: Federalist (Before 1816); Democratic (Before 1834); Whig (1834–1852); Know Nothing (1856–1861)
- Spouse: Charity Cain m.1819
- Children: 5
- Education: University of North Carolina, Chapel Hill (BA)

Willie Person Mangum (/ˈwaɪli ˈpɑːrsən/; May 10, 1792 – September 7, 1861) was an American politician and planter who served as U.S. Senator from the state of North Carolina between 1831 and 1836 and between 1840 and 1853. He was one of the founders and leading members of the Whig party, and was a candidate for president in 1836 as part of the unsuccessful Whig strategy to defeat Martin Van Buren by running four candidates with local appeal in different regions of the country.

Mangum served as President pro tempore of the Senate for most of John Tyler's presidency, between 1842 and 1845. He was, therefore, first in the presidential line of succession during this time, as Tyler did not have a vice president. (There was no constitutional mechanism for filling an intra-term vice presidential vacancy at the time.) Had Tyler died, resigned or been removed from office at any time during his presidency, Mangum would have become acting president of the United States.

== Early life and education ==
Mangum was born in Durham County, North Carolina (then part of Orange County), to a family from the planter class. He was the son of Catherine (Davis) and William Person Mangum. In his youth, he attended the respected private school in Raleigh run by John Chavis, a free black. They remained friends for years and had a long correspondence. He graduated from the University of North Carolina in 1815.

== Career ==
Mangum began a law practice and entered politics. He was elected to the United States House of Representatives, serving from 1823 to 1826. After an interlude as a superior court judge, he was elected by the legislature as a Democrat to the Senate from North Carolina in 1830.

Mangum's stay in the Democratic Party was short. He opposed President Andrew Jackson on most of the major issues of the day, including the protective tariff, nullification, and the Bank of the United States. In 1834, Mangum openly declared himself to be a "Whig", and two years later, he resigned his Senate seat.

Due to a lack of organizational cohesion in the new Whig Party during the 1836 election, the Whigs put forward four presidential candidates: Daniel Webster in Massachusetts, William Henry Harrison in the remaining Northern and Border States, Hugh White in the middle and lower South, and Mangum in South Carolina. Some optimistic Whigs foresaw the nomination of several candidates resulting in denying a majority of electoral votes to any one candidate and throwing the election into the House of Representatives, much like what occurred in 1824, where Whig representatives could then coalesce around a single candidate. This possibility, however, did not come to fruition and Democratic candidate Martin Van Buren won the election with an outright majority of electoral votes. The legislature of South Carolina (which chose their electors until 1865) gave Mangum its 11 electoral votes.

After a four-year absence, Mangum served two more terms in the Senate, where he was an important ally of Henry Clay. In 1842, he succeeded Samuel L. Southard as president pro tempore of the Senate, during a vice presidential vacancy. Upon assuming office on May 23, he also became next in succession to the presidency, and remained so until the swearing in of George M. Dallas on March 4, 1845, a period which included President John Tyler's narrow escape from death in the USS Princeton disaster of 1844. In 1852, he refused an offer to be a candidate for vice president on the Whig national ticket; fellow North Carolinian William Alexander Graham was nominated instead.

Realizing that he had little chance of being re-elected as the Whig Party broke up following the 1852 elections, Mangum retired in 1853 at the end of his second term. In 1856 he, like many ex-Whigs, joined the nativist American Party, but a stroke soon afterward ended his political career.

Mangum died at his family estate in Red Mountain, an unincorporated area of Durham County, on September 7, 1861. He was buried in the family cemetery on his estate. Mangum Elementary School in the area is named in his honor.

== Marriage and family ==
Mangum married Charity Alston Cain of Pleasant Grove Plantation in 1819. They had five children. Their only son died in July 1861 at the First Battle of Bull Run, a month before his father.

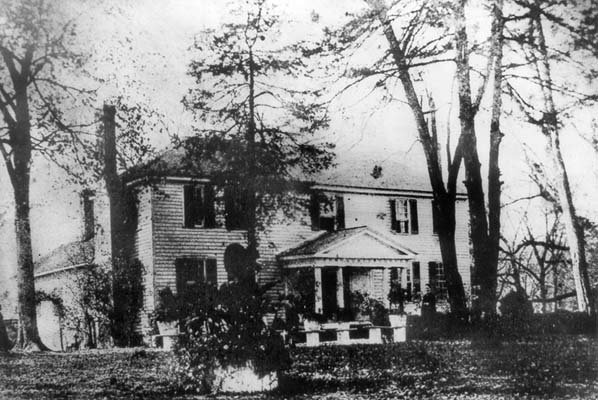
Walnut Hall, Mangum's plantation in North Carolina

His slave plantation was known as Walnut Hall. A 1931 biography of John Chavis noted that Mangum had allowed his former teacher to be buried on his land. The gravesite was found in 1988 by the John Chavis Historical Society, and is now marked as the "Old Cemetery" on maps of Hill Forest.

U.S. House of Representatives
Preceded by Josiah Crudup	Member of the U.S. House of Representatives from North Carolina's 8th congressional district 1823–1826	Succeeded by Daniel L. Barringer
U.S. Senate
Preceded by James Iredell, Jr.	U.S. senator (Class 3) from North Carolina; 1831–1836; Served alongside: Bedford Brown	Succeeded by Robert Strange
Preceded by Bedford Brown	U.S. senator (Class 2) from North Carolina; 1840–1853; Served alongside: William A. Graham, William H. Haywood, Jr., George E. Badger	Succeeded by David S. Reid
Preceded by Samuel L. Southard	President pro tempore of the United States Senate; May 31, 1842 – March 3, 1845	Succeeded by Ambrose Hundley Sevier
