= Henry L. Kamphoefner House =

Historic house in North Carolina, United States

- U.S. National Register of Historic Places
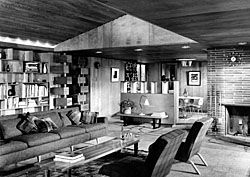
- Interior view of the Henry L. Kamphoefner House

- Location within North Carolina Location within the United States
- Location: 3060 Granville Dr., Raleigh, North Carolina
- Coordinates: 35°49′21.46″N 78°39′46.1″W
- Area: less than one acre
- Built: 1950
- Built by: J.M. Thompson
- Architect: Henry L. Kamphoefner, George Matsumoto
- Architectural style: Wrightian, Usonian
- MPS: Early Modern Architecture Associated with NCSU School of Design Faculty MPS
- NRHP reference No.: 96000197
- Added to NRHP: March 12, 1996

The Henry L. Kamphoefner House was the first Modernist house built in Raleigh, North Carolina. During the mid-20th century, faculty members from the School of Design located at North Carolina State College (now known as North Carolina State University) designed and built several modernist houses in Raleigh for themselves, other faculty, and a few clients. Henry L. Kamphoefner, originally the head of the University of Oklahoma's architecture program, became the first dean of the college's School of Design. Kamphoefner was awarded the North Carolina Award for Fine Arts in 1978 for his work and encouragement of other Modernists to build and design homes in the state. In 1977 he was awarded the Topaz Medallion for Lifelong Achievement in Architecture by the Association of Collegiate Schools of Architecture. The Kamphoefner House was listed on the National Register of Historic Places in 1996 and is designated a Raleigh Historic Landmark.

George Matsumoto, architect of the Ritcher House, and Kamphoefner designed the Kamphoefner House in 1948. The home was constructed in 1950. It is an example of Frank Lloyd Wright's Usonian mode of design, characterized by small scale, affordable construction, open plan interiors, integration of interior and exterior spaces, flat roof and large glazed areas such as windows and doors. The house is oriented around a large, central brick chimney. The rear of the house features large insulated windows, the first of its kind in Raleigh. These windows face a large open terrace and offer a view of the nearby golf course. The front of the house contains no windows, allowing privacy to the occupants.

== See also ==
- List of Registered Historic Places in North Carolina
