= Matsumoto House =

Historic house in North Carolina, United States

- U.S. National Register of Historic Places
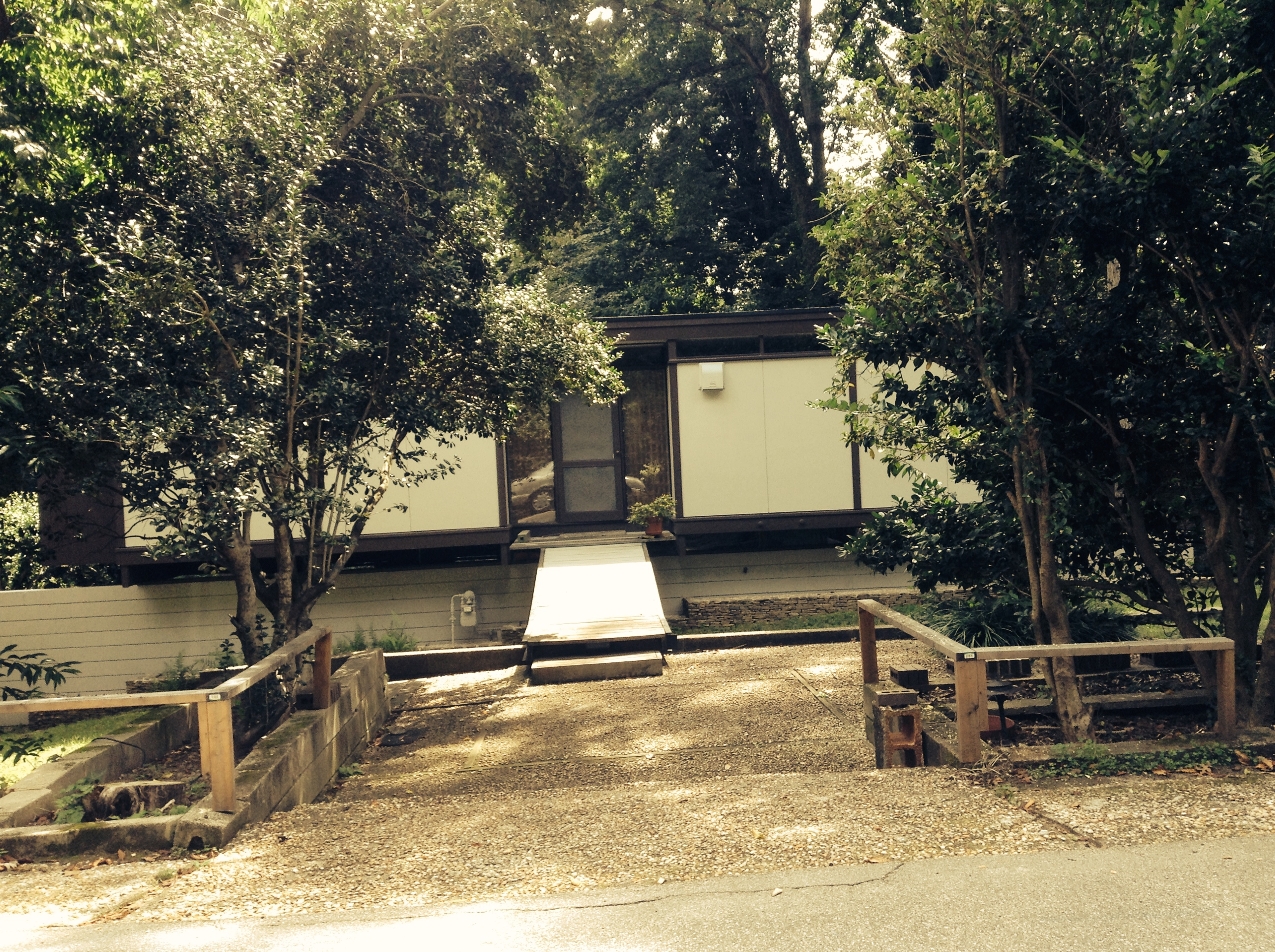
- Matsumoto House, September 2014

- Location within North Carolina Location within the United States
- Location: 1514 Delmont Dr., Raleigh, North Carolina
- Coordinates: 35°48′55″N 78°40′31″W
- Area: less than one acre
- Built: 1952-1954
- Built by: Walser, Frank
- Architect: Matsumoto, George
- Architectural style: Miesian
- MPS: Early Modern Architecture Associated with NCSU School of Design Faculty MPS
- NRHP reference No.: 94001089
- Added to NRHP: September 21, 1994

Matsumoto House is a historic home located at Raleigh, Wake County, North Carolina. It was built in 1952–1954, and is a one-story, rectangular, post and beam-framed house cantilevered over a concrete block base, Miesian inspired dwelling. It was designed by George Matsumoto and built by Frank Walser. It has a paved and landscaped forecourt and full-width, glazed rear wall fronted by a cantilevered, screened porch.

It was listed on the National Register of Historic Places in 1994.
