= Martin Meade =

English historian and photographer (1945–2015)

Martin Meade (1945 – 2015) was an architectural historian of some renown who lived and worked in London and Paris. He was a man of sartorial elegance who favoured vintage clothing in the Edwardian style.

== Biography ==
Meade was born in Bath in 1945 to John and Pamela Meade who were both artists. His given name was Martin Kew Meade. His sister Michele was born in 1952.

Meade was educated at the French Lycée in Kensington, London. He went on to study for a general arts degree followed by a Diploma in Fine Arts at Edinburgh University. From there he commenced a PhD at the Courtauld Institute of Art in London under the supervision of Anthony Blunt. Meade's research subject was Lenoir le Romain, the 18th-century Neoclassical architect, though there is no evidence to suggest that he completed this degree.

In 1983 Meade married Charlotte Ellis (1945-2008), an architectural journalist who became an editor at the Architectural Review, a publication to which Meade himself contributed.

== Working life ==
Meade's working life began in 1969 when he was employed as an investigator of historic buildings for the Ministry of Works, a post he left in 1980. In that year he moved to Paris, France, where he combined writing for the Architectural Review, teaching at the Ecole Spéciale d'Architecture (from 1982) and organising various trips to India and Europe for that organisation.

== Legacy ==
Architectural photographs attributed to Meade are held in the Conway Library at the Courtauld Institute of Art.

Meade contributed to the International Conference on Architecture and Cities for the 21st Century which was held in Valencia, Spain, 2–4 July 1998. The subject of his address was "Architectural and urban heritage: dead weight or dynamic asset for future?"

Meade contributed to the Survey of London, covering the area of Knightsbridge in Volume 45 of that series.

Meade's published works as author or editor include:

- Dom Bellot: Moine-Architecte
- Relation de la fête de Versailles du dix-huit juillet mille six cent soixante-huit; Les divertissements de Versailles donnés par le Roi à toute sa cour au retour de la conquête de la France-Comté en l'année mille six cent soixante-quatorze
- Grand Oriental Hotels: from Cairo to Tokyo, 1800–1939 (British Edition in the British Library
- Londres: Cité de l'Architecture et du Patrimoine

As compiler and illustrator:

- Drawings for Architecture Design and Ornament

As supervisor

- L'architecture normande en Europe : identités et échanges du XIe siècle à nos jours

Charlotte Ellis and Meade interviewed Charlotte Perriand, the French architect and designer, for the Architectural Review in November 1984. It was re-published in the Review's edition of 6 March 2014.
