= Walnut Hall (Durham, North Carolina) =

Plantation in Durham County, North Carolina

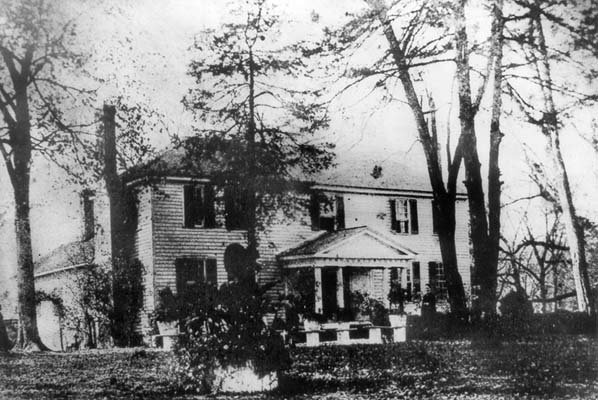
- The house in 1870
- Alternative names: Willie P. Mangum House

General information
- Status: Demolished
- Type: plantation house
- Architectural style: Greek Revival
- Location: Bahama, Durham County, North Carolina, U.S.
- Construction started: 1842
- Construction stopped: 1845
- Demolished: 1980
- Owner: Willie Person Mangum; William B. Hampton

Walnut Hall, also known as the Willie P. Mangum House, was a plantation in Durham County, North Carolina, near Bahama. It was the estate of Willie Person Mangum, who served as President pro tempore of the United States Senate. Walnut Hall was a 600-acre plantation that produced tobacco, corn, and wheat through the forced labour of enslaved people. In 1863, Mangum's daughter, Martha Person Mangum, started a school for girls at the plantation. The plantation was later sold to William B. Hampton. In 1933, a large section of the house was destroyed in a fire. The remaining structure of the house was destroyed in another fire in 1980. Since 1977, the land where Walnut Hall stood has been part of the G.W. Hill Forest, managed by North Carolina State University. The family cemetery, which remains on the property, is the burial place of Senator Mangum and his former teacher, John Chavis.

== History ==
Walnut Hall was built by the politician Willie Person Mangum, who served as President pro tempore of the U.S. Senate. The house was built as an addition to his father's home, which was built around 1800. The house, originally styled after the nearby Fairntosh Plantation, was constructed between 1842 and 1845 in northern Durham, near Red Mountain, in present-day Bahama. Mangum named his 600-acre estate for two large walnut trees growing on the property. The plantation included the manor house, a kitchen, an icehouse, a smokehouse, an office building, a carriage house, a carriage driver's house, several barns, and three houses for enslaved people.

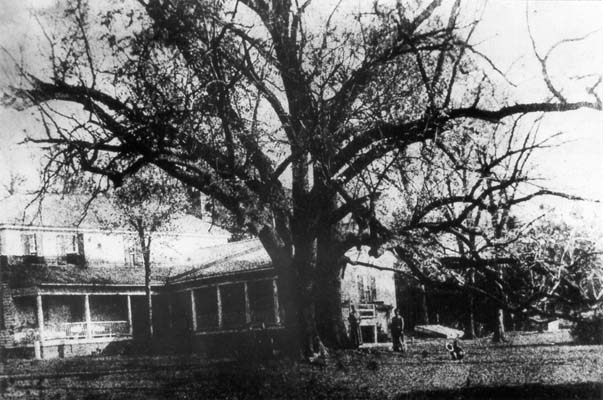
backside of the house circa 1870.

Mangum planted various specimens of trees and other plants at Walnut Hall that he procured in Washington, D.C.

Mangum's wife, Charity Cain Mangum, managed the plantation operations. The Mangums enslaved twenty people in 1850, twelve people in 1860, and by 1861 they enslaved four people. Through forced labor of enslaved people, Walnut Hall produced wheat, corn, and tobacco as cash crops. After Mangum inherited debts from his father, his father-in-law, William Cain of Pleasant Grove Plantation, saved him from financial ruin. Mangum's wife maintained a rose garden, a rose arbor, a summer house of cedars, and an orchard. Some of the trees on the estate were brought from Pennsylvania by Mangum's grandparents before the American Revolution. Mangum retired from politics in 1856 and remained at Walnut Hall for the remainder of his life.

The 6th North Carolina Regiment Flat River Guards of the Confederate States Army, which included Mangum's son, William Preston Mangum, marched to Walnut Hall before leaving to fight in the American Civil War. Mangum's son died less than a month later, during the First Battle of Bull Run. Mangum died shortly after that, on September 7, 1861. He and his son were both buried in the family cemetery at Walnut Hall. Mangum's former teacher, a free black man named John Chavis, is also buried in the Mangum cemetery.

After the death of her husband, Charity Cain Mangum and her daughters continued to resided at the plantation, where they managed the farm while selling off portions of the land to their neighbor, Zachariah Hampton. One of their daughters, Martha Person Mangum, started a girls' school at Walnut Hall in 1863. Martha and her sister, Mary Sutherland Mangum, resided at Walnut Hall until their deaths in 1902. After the deaths of Mary and Martha, the plantation was placed into a public auction, excluding the family cemetery from the sale, which remained in the Mangum family. Walnut Hall was purchased by William B. Hampton, a neighbor of the Mangum family, for $3,850 for 565 acres. The Hampton family lived at Walnut Hall until 1916, when they moved to Braggtown, after which they rented the house to various tenants.

By 1929, the manor house had fallen into bad shape. On December 24, 1933, the 1845 section of the house was destroyed in a fire. The property remained in the Hampton family until 1977 when it was acquired by the North Carolina State University's School of Forestry and was added to the adjacent G.W. Hill Forest. The original 1800 part of the house burned down in 1980.
