= Lewis J. Clarke =

English-American landscape architect (1927–2021)

Lewis James Clarke (10 March 1927 – 6 June 2021) was born in Carlton, Nottinghamshire, England. He is a landscape architect of the Modernist period. Clarke was one of Dean Henry L. Kamphoefner's early faculty members at the North Carolina State University School (now College) of Design, and has been recognised as the founder of several fields of study one of which was the introduction of ecological principles into the field of landscape architecture.

== Early life ==
Clarke's parents lived in Gedling, Nottinghamshire, a small town near Carlton. He was the first of three children born to Roland and May Pringle Clarke. A sister, Aileen, married renowned commercial artist, Lancelot Jones; her twin brother, Graham Clarke (d. 2007) served in Korea and was noted for piloting the first hovercraft down the Oroonoko River on a trip sponsored by the Duke of Edinburgh and the Geographical Magazine of The Royal Geographical Society in 1968.

Clarke joined the Cub Scouts as soon as he was old enough and remained an active member of the Boy Scouts through his young adult life, earning the prestigious Wood Badge. Staying on as a troop leader as older men were drafted for World War II, Clarke was also a student at Loughborough then started his Diploma in Architecture at the University of Leicester. The first structure he designed during his studies as an architect was the 1st Nanpantan Troop's Headquarters still located on Nanpantan Road in Loughborough. Clarke's father built the front gates still in use and welded the insignias into the gate design.

== Academic career ==
During World War II, Clarke served as an officer in the British Corps of Royal Engineers, GE 11 in Hong Kong. After the War, he returned to Leicester to complete his diploma and then enrolled at Kings College, University of Durham to become one of Brian Hackett's first three students to study landscape design. In 1951, Clarke was awarded a Fulbright Scholarship and a Smith Mundt grant to attend Harvard University's School of Design then under the leadership of Walter Chambers and Hideo Sasaki.

Clarke graduated from Harvard in 1952 with a masters in landscape architecture. He has since been recognised as one of eight Sasaki era students whose work shaped the Modernist design period.

His 1959 article, "Teaching People To See," publicised a new way to approach design in the landscape about which Clarke had been lecturing for several years.

Clarke is one of the last surviving faculty members appointed by the founding dean, Henry L. Kamphoefner, of the North Carolina State University School (now College) of Design. Clarke served on the faculty beginning in 1952. In 1955, he was a presenter and panel member at the Aspen International Design Festival. Additionally, his 1950s research on plants in artificial environments culminated later in enclosed mall applications. His work with students on "regional reconnaissance" is now a commonplace part of the ecological field as overlay analysis. His early endoscopic camera investigations, and three-dimensional model box studies with students steadily became a key aspect of spatial form evaluation methodology. It could be said that the "model box" principle was a precursor to CAD.

Also, during his teaching career Professor Clarke was visiting lecturer and design critic at various universities including the University of Virginia, Pennsylvania, Georgia, Ball State, Harvard, Toronto, Michigan State, Louisiana State and Berkeley. While a professor, Clarke received two Distinguished Classroom Teacher Awards and an Outstanding Teacher Award. In 1961, Clarke was a Raleigh News & Observer "Tar Heel of the Week."

== Professional practice ==
Developing his practice while a faculty member, Clarke was a pioneer in ecologically sensitive resort master planning. In 1964, he officially opened his practice, Lewis Clarke Associates. A seminal work entitled Design and Development Guide for Palmetto Dunes, Hilton Head Island, South Carolina was published in the mid-1960s. Palmetto Dunes was followed by Keowee Key, South Carolina; Carolina Lakes and Carolina Trace, Sanford, North Carolina; Linville Ridge in the Smokies; and Fords Colony, Williamsburg, Virginia.

Resigning his faculty position in 1968, Clarke focused on his practice. His professional work includes early community college planning in North Carolina and Virginia, and prototype enclosed mall projects in Charlotte, San Antonio, Pittsburgh, Louisville, and Cherry Hill, New Jersey. Lewis Clarke Associates designed the first master plans for the North Carolina Zoological Park, the Fayetteville Street Mall in Raleigh, the Research Triangle Institute, and the Western Electric campus in Greensboro. Wayne Community Hospital in Goldsboro, Mount Olive College in Mount Olive, and Saint Andrews College in Laurinburg are typical of his North Carolina campus projects.

Clarke received numerous professional awards including ASLA and AIA Excellence and Merit Awards, Progressive Architecture Annual Awards and AAN Awards, some presented by first ladies Lady Bird Johnson, Betty Ford, and Nancy Reagan. Clarke served as president of the local ASLA chapter, on the Raleigh Planning Commission, and the ASLA National Accreditation Committees.

Clarke was a 1980 Fellow of the American Society of Landscape Architects (FASLA), a member emeritus of the North Carolina Chapter of the American Society of Landscape Architects (NCASLA), a retired member of the Royal Institute of British Architects (RIBA), and a Mason of Lodge # _______. He continued to practice with his firm, Lewis Clarke Associates, until 2000. After retiring, he consulted, wrote, and painted. Clarke's papers and the Lewis Clarke Associates' drawings and documents are archived at the North Carolina State University Libraries Special Collections Research Center.

== Family ==
Clarke has been a US citizen since the mid-1950s. He was married to Kit Swinson of Mt. Olive, North Carolina for twenty years. They have four children; Nigel, Jennifer, Rachel, Lisa, and three grandchildren; Katherine, Sarah, and Cody.
