= Josiah Crudup =

American politician

Member of the U.S. House of Representatives from North Carolina's 8th district
- In office March 4, 1821 – March 3, 1823
- Preceded by: James Strudwick Smith
- Succeeded by: Willie P. Mangum

Personal details
- Born: January 13, 1791 Wake County, North Carolina, U.S.
- Died: May 20, 1872 (aged 81) Kittrell, North Carolina, U.S.
- Party: Democratic-Republican
- Relatives: Billy Crudup (descendant)

Josiah Crudup (January 13, 1791 – May 20, 1872) was a U.S. Congressman from North Carolina between 1821 and 1823.

Crudup was born in Wakelon, North Carolina in Wake County, the son of Elizabeth (Battle) and Josiah Crudup, a Baptist minister. Crudup attended a private school in Louisburg, North Carolina, and then Columbian College (now George Washington University) in Washington, DC. He studied theology and was ordained as a Baptist minister, which was his profession his entire life.

Also a farmer and slave owner, Crudup was elected to the North Carolina Senate from Wake County in 1820, but was forced to vacate his office because the state constitution at the time forbade "a minister of the Gospel, while exercising his ministerial functions, to hold a public office." In the 1850 US Federal Census Slave Schedule, Crudup is listed as enslaving 52 men, women and children; by 1860, according to the US Federal Census Slave Schedule, that number had increased to 64.

In 1821, he was elected to the 17th United States Congress and served for one term, from March 4, 1821 to March 3, 1823. Although he ran for re-election in 1822, he was narrowly defeated by Willie P. Mangum and returned to farming and the ministry. Crudup was a delegate from Granville County to the 1835 North Carolina Constitutional Convention, and died in Kittrell, North Carolina in 1872; he is buried in his family cemetery near Kittrell. Among his descendants is actor Billy Crudup.

U.S. House of Representatives
Preceded by James S. Smith	Member of the U.S. House of Representatives from North Carolina's 8th congressional district 1821–1823	Succeeded by Willie P. Mangum
