= Arthur Larson =

American lawyer (1910–1993)

Lewis "Arthur" Larson
- Born: July 4, 1910; Sioux Falls, South Dakota
- Died: March 27, 1993 (aged 82); Durham, North Carolina
- Education: Augustana College; Pembroke College, Oxford
- Occupations: Professor, public servant, lawyer
- Political party: Republican

Lewis Arthur Larson (July 4, 1910 – March 27, 1993) was an American lawyer, law professor, United States Under Secretary of Labor from 1954 to 1956, director of the United States Information Agency from 1956 to 1957, and executive assistant for speeches for U.S. President Dwight D. Eisenhower from 1957 to 1958.

== Early life and education ==
Arthur Larson (he avoided using his first name) was born in Sioux Falls, South Dakota. He was the third of five children of Lewis Larson and Anna Huseboe Larson, both of whom were second-generation Americans of Norwegian descent. Larson's father was a family court judge in Sioux Falls. Larson attended the public schools there and the local Lutheran college, Augustana, and then studied law at Pembroke College, Oxford (1932–1935) as a Rhodes scholar. He married Florence Newcomb on July 31, 1935.

== Legal, political, and scholarly pursuits ==
Larson then worked as a lawyer for four years (1935–1939) with the firm of Quarles, Spence and Quarles in Milwaukee, Wisconsin. When Depression-era conditions led to his layoff in the summer of 1939, Larson found a job as assistant professor of law at the University of Tennessee College of Law in Knoxville. While in Tennessee, he and Florence Newcomb Larson had two children.

In 1941, during World War II, Larson moved to Washington, DC, when he mostly worked as a lumber industry regulator at the Office of Price Administration. In 1945, he became an assistant professor of law at Cornell Law School in Ithaca, New York. Over the next seven years, he produced the legal treatise Larson's Workers' Compensation Law (Matthew Bender: 1952). The treatise is continually updated and is still used by lawyers and judges today. His son, Lex K. Larson, is the current editor. The treatise was the first publication to treat workers' compensation as a distinct area of law with its own legal doctrines and rules for injured and deceased workers. It is currently 17 volumes in length.

In 1953, Larson was appointed dean of the University of Pittsburgh School of Law in Pittsburgh, Pennsylvania.

== Eisenhower administration ==
Larson's status as an expert on the welfare state and his strong public speaking abilities led to appointment as Under Secretary of Labor in March 1954 in the Eisenhower administration. Larson's most popular book, A Republican Looks at His Party (Harper and Row: 1956) was personally endorsed by Eisenhower.

Eisenhower named Larson the director of the United States Information Agency (USIA) in December 1956 and as his top speechwriter in October 1957.

== Return to academia ==
After leaving the Eisenhower administration in the fall of 1958, Larson became a law professor at Duke University in Durham, North Carolina, where he specialized in international law, arms control, and disarmament. 1973 saw the completion of the L. Arthur and Florence Larson Residence, a centerpiece of North Carolina modernist architecture designed by Jon Condoret.

== Death ==
He died in Durham on March 27, 1993.

== Legacy ==
Larson is criticized as a prototypical big government Republican in Barry Goldwater's landmark small government Republican manifesto, The Conscience of a Conservative. However, his life and work are treated at length in a biography by David Stebenne, Modern Republican: Arthur Larson and the Eisenhower Years (Indiana University Press, 2006).
