= Hampton–Ellis Farm =

Historic farm in North Carolina, United States

- U.S. National Register of Historic Places
- Location within North Carolina Location within the United States
- Location: 3305 Pat Tilley Rd., Bahama, North Carolina
- Coordinates: 36°10′11″N 78°50′01″W
- Area: 11.5 acres (4.7 ha)
- Built: c 1900, c. 1922
- NRHP reference No.: 11000955
- Added to NRHP: December 22, 2011

Hampton–Ellis Farm, also known as William Beanis Hampton Farm and Jonah Ellis Farm, is a historic home and tobacco farm located near Bahama, Durham County, North Carolina. The farmhouse was built about 1900, as a one-story, three-bay, center hall plan dwelling. It was enlarged about 1922, with the addition of a kitchen ell. The house features a one-story, hip-roofed front porch. Contributing outbuildings include the wood shed, cannery, smokehouse, feed house, tenant house, tenant smokehouse, tenant woodshed, pack house, ordering/stripping house, and four tobacco barns. With the exception of the ordering/stripping house and three of the tobacco barns, all the outbuildings were built about 1922.

It was listed on the National Register of Historic Places in 2011.
