= Adolphus W. Umstead House =

Historic house in North Carolina, United States

- U.S. National Register of Historic Places
- Location within North Carolina Location within the United States
- Location: NC 1607, 0.5 miles (0.80 km) north of NC 1611, near Bahama, North Carolina
- Coordinates: 36°11′07″N 78°51′16″W
- Area: 40 acres (16 ha)
- Built: c. 1850
- Architectural style: Greek Revival, Vernacular I-house
- NRHP reference No.: 89001418
- Added to NRHP: September 14, 1989

Adolphus W. Umstead House is a historic home located at Bahama, Durham County, North Carolina. It was built about 1850, and is a two-story, three-bay, Greek Revival style frame I-house. It has a long one-story offset rear ell and a one-story one-room side wing. Also on the property is a contributing stable.

It was listed on the National Register of Historic Places in 1989.
