= Marcus Tilley House =

Historic house in North Carolina, United States

- U.S. National Register of Historic Places
- Location within North Carolina Location within the United States
- Location: 7616 Jock Rd., Bahama, North Carolina
- Coordinates: 36°9′20″N 78°50′26″W
- Area: 13.6 acres (5.5 ha)
- Built: c. 1880
- Architectural style: I-House
- NRHP reference No.: 99001684
- Added to NRHP: January 14, 2000

Marcus Tilley House, also known as the Roscoe Tilley House, is a historic home located at Bahama, Durham County, North Carolina. It was built about 1880, and is a two-story, frame I-house built over an original 1 1/2-story log dwelling. Also on the property is a contributing log smokehouse.

It was listed on the National Register of Historic Places in 2000.
