= Ritcher House =

Historic house in North Carolina, United States

- U.S. National Register of Historic Places
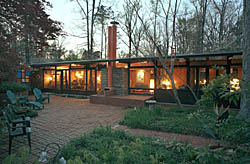

- Location within North Carolina Location within the United States
- Location: 3039 Churchill Rd., Raleigh, North Carolina
- Coordinates: 35°48′19.54″N 78°40′38.9″W
- Built: 1956
- Architect: George Matsumoto; Frank Walser
- Architectural style: Wrightian
- MPS: Early Modern Architecture Associated with NCSU School of Design Faculty MPS
- NRHP reference No.: 94001087
- Added to NRHP: September 21, 1994

The Ritcher House is considered to be one of the best examples of Frank Lloyd Wright's Usonian mode of design in North Carolina. Located near downtown Raleigh, the house is one of many Modernist houses that were built in the city during the mid-20th century. Most of these homes were designed by faculty members of the North Carolina State University School of Design. Established in 1948 by Henry Kamphoefner, the school hired several Modernist architects as faculty members. Kamphoefner was awarded the North Carolina Award for Fine Arts in 1978 for his work and for his encouragement of other Modernists to build and design homes in the state. On September 21, 1994, the Ritcher House was listed on the National Register of Historic Places. The house is also a Raleigh Historic Landmark.

George Matsumoto, a professor teaching architectural classes at North Carolina State University, designed the Ritcher House in 1951 along with Henry Kamphoefner. The house was built on a modest budget and is an example of modular constructivism and timber framing.

== See also ==
- List of Registered Historic Places in North Carolina
