= Oleson Park Music Pavilion =

- U.S. National Register of Historic Places
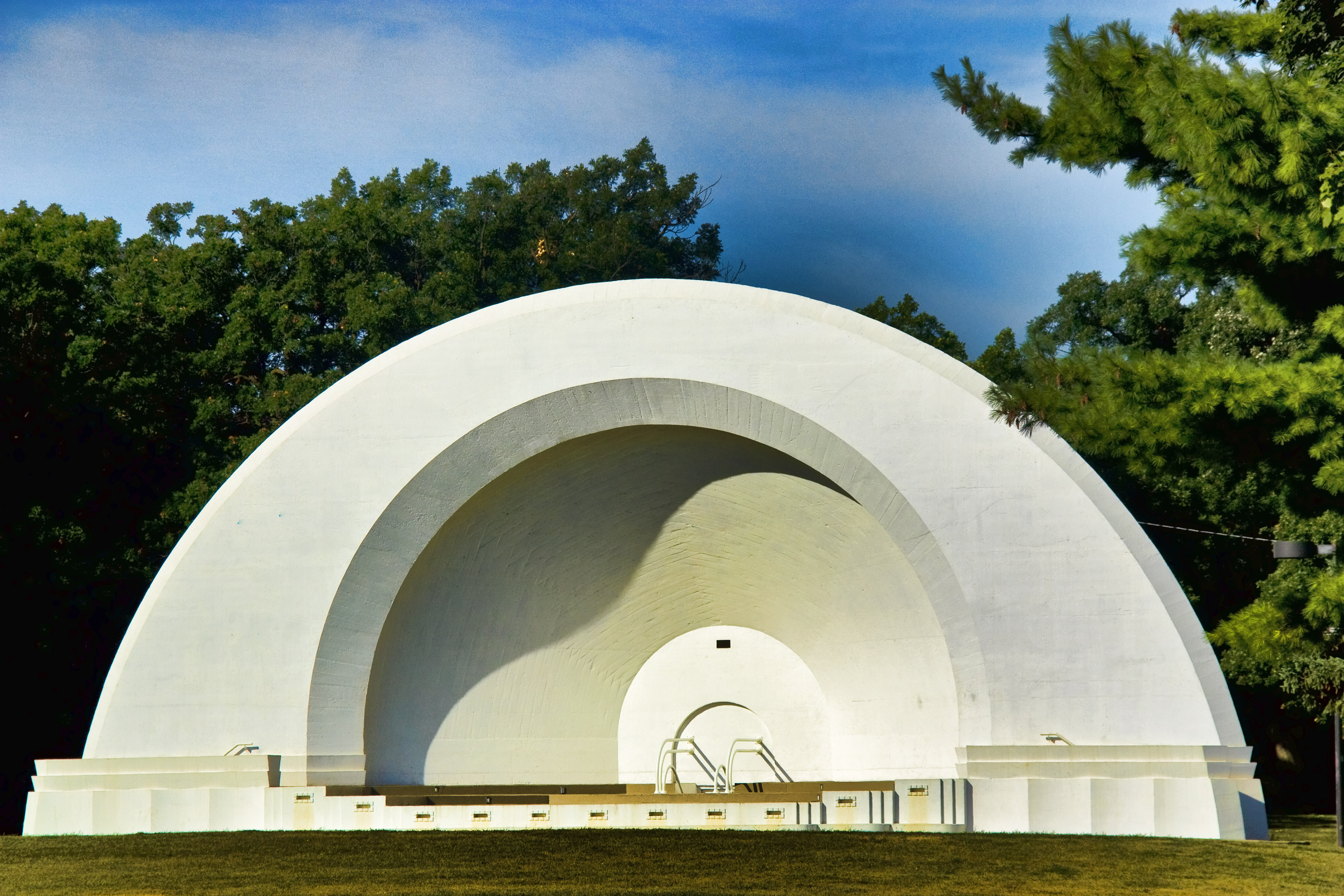

- Location within Iowa Location within the United States
- Location: 1400 Oleson Park Ave. Fort Dodge, Iowa
- Coordinates: 42°29′20″N 94°10′20″W
- Area: 3.4 acres (1.4 ha)
- Built: 1938
- Architect: Henry Kamphoefner; Samuel Fulton
- Architectural style: Modern Movement
- NRHP reference No.: 03000357
- Added to NRHP: May 9, 2003

The Oleson Park Music Pavilion', dedicated as Karl King Bandshell, is located in Fort Dodge, Iowa, United States. The pavilion is associated with Karl King, a famed composer for concert and military bands, who advocated for its construction. It was designed by Henry L. Kamphoefner, a Sioux City architect at that time, who had previously designed the Grandview Park Music Pavilion in Sioux City. It was built as a Works Progress Administration (WPA) project. The WPA paid for 85% of its construction, with the City of Fort Dodge paying the rest. The poured concrete structure was built in a Modernist style with Art Deco overtones. It rises to a height of 36 feet (11 m), and it is known for its acoustical excellence. The pavilion replaced a bandstand that was built in the 1920s in the city square. It was dedicated to King in 1976, and listed on the National Register of Historic Places in 2003.
