= G. Milton Small and Associates Office Building =

- U.S. National Register of Historic Places
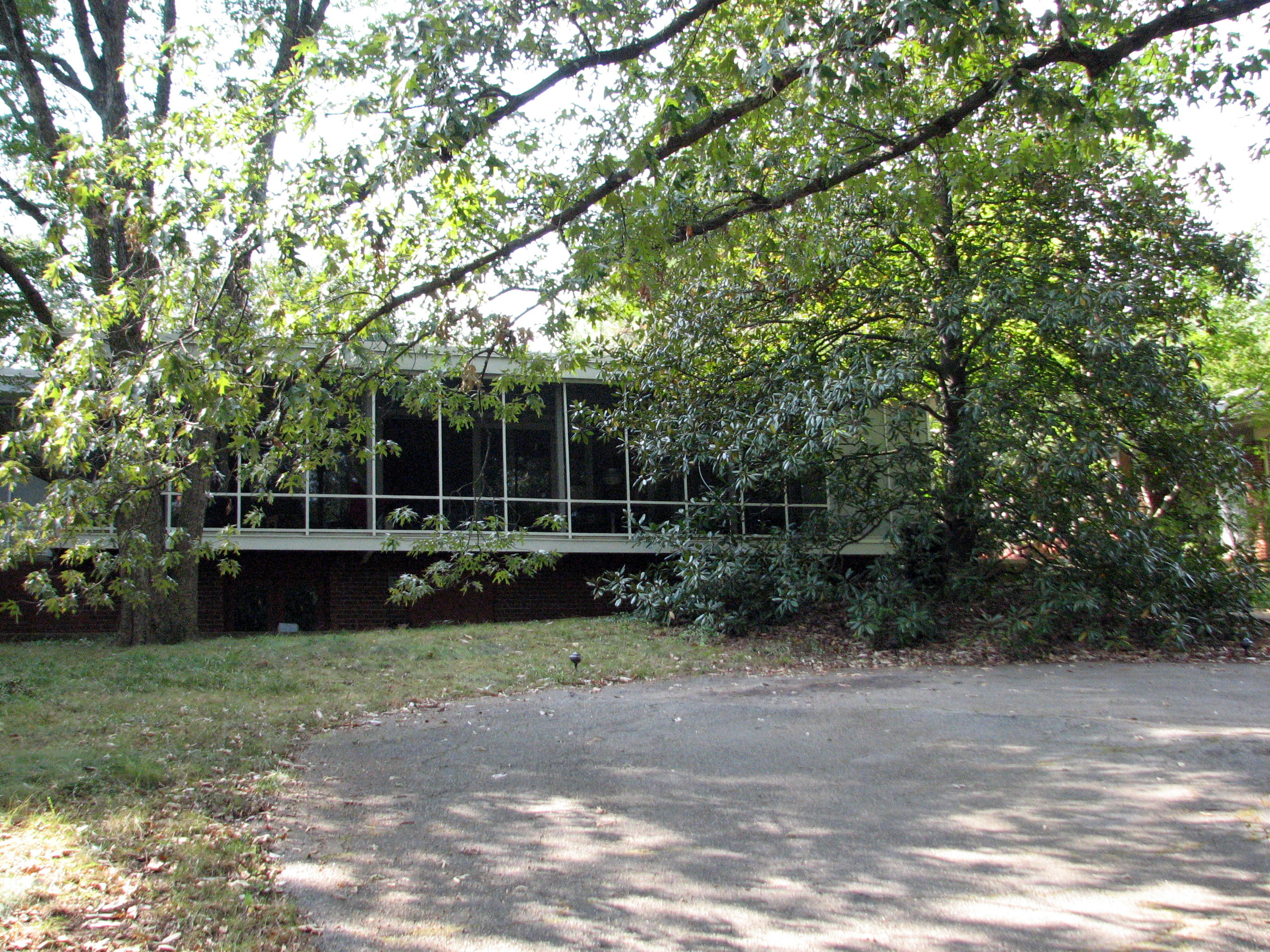
- G. Milton Small and Associates Office Building, September 2010

- Location within North Carolina Location within the United States
- Location: 105 Brooks Ave., Raleigh, North Carolina
- Coordinates: 35°47′22″N 78°40′25″W
- Area: less than one acre
- Built: 1966
- Built by: Walser, Frank
- Architect: Small, G. Milton
- Architectural style: Miesian
- MPS: Early Modern Architecture Associated with NCSU School of Design Faculty MPS
- NRHP reference No.: 94001085
- Added to NRHP: September 21, 1994

G. Milton Small and Associates Office Building is a historic home and office located on Brooks Avenue in Raleigh, Wake County, North Carolina. It was designed by architect G. Milton Small (1916-1992), who also designed the Small House, and built in 1966. It is a one floor, steel-frame Miesian style building that covers most of a 69-foot by 155-foot flat lot. It features grids of aluminum mullions carrying metal panels and sheets of glass, and an overhanging flat roof. It housed the architecture firm of G. Milton Small and Associates.

It was listed on the National Register of Historic Places in 1994.
