= Edward "Terry" Walter Rail Waugh =

Edward "Terry" Walter Rail Waugh (24 January 1913 – March 1966) was a South African architect known for helping to bring Modern architecture to the southern United States and North Carolina in particular through his association with the School of Design at North Carolina State College (now North Carolina State University).

== Biography and career ==
Waugh was born in Johannesburg, South Africa to architect Edward Henry Waugh and Elizabeth Creighton Luckie. Waugh entered the University of Edinburgh Schools of Engineering and Architecture from which he graduated with a BA in 1935 and an MA in 1938. The following year, Waugh returned to South Africa where he practiced architecture with his father under the name Waugh & Waugh.

When he immigrated to the United States in 1941, Waugh worked a variety of jobs including structural designer for Fluor in Los Angeles, aircraft layout engineer for Hughes Aircraft Company, and as set a designer for Columbia Pictures in Hollywood. In 1944, upon receiving fellowship to the Cranbrook Academy of Art, he studied under Eero Saarinen and worked in his firm (Saarinen and Swanson). He won the Chicago Herald American International City Plan Competition Grand Prize in 1945, at which point he was partners with George Matsumoto and David Greer. Waugh taught at the University of Kansas and was a principal in the firm of Runnells, Clark, Waugh, and Matsumoto in Kansas City before Henry Kamphoefner recruited him to teach at the University of Oklahoma in 1948.

Later that same year, Waugh moved to North Carolina with George Matsumoto, Duncan Stewart, James Walter Fitzgibbon, and others when Kamphoefner became the first dean of the North Carolina State College School of Design. Kamphoefner and those he brought with him to the new School of Design were heavily influenced by Modernist architecture and their work helped bring North Carolina into the mainstream of the movement. The school brought in internationally renowned architects as Mies van der Rohe, Frank Lloyd Wright, Louis I. Kahn, Walter Gropius, Marcel Breuer, Pier Luigi Nervi, and Charles Eames to lecture and experiment.

Established in Raleigh, North Carolina, Waugh and the other modernist architects built industrial, residential, commercial, ecclesiastical, governmental, and educational buildings. As a result North Carolina grew to have the third highest concentration of modernist homes in the United States. Waugh taught as professor at the University until 1951 when he briefly became partners with Ed Loewenstein and later Raymond Sawyer. In 1952, he opened his own firm, Edward Waugh Associates and continued to operate it when he became campus planner for North Carolina State University in 1957. Waugh established the School Design Standards for the Department of Public Instruction and designed many schools in Raleigh, including Sherwood Bates and Frances Lacy Elementary schools as well as Daniels Junior High School.

In 1960 Waugh and his wife Elizabeth collaborated in writing The South Builds, New Architecture in the Old South, which was published by the University of North Carolina Press.

From 1963-1965, he was Chief Architect for the Universidad Agraria campus Molina in Peru, for which period he provided the over-all plan, designed numerous buildings, and supervised the plans for construction of laboratories, dormitories, offices and a library. With G. Milton Small, Waugh designed the Winston-Salem Memorial Coliseum and designed Harrelson Hall, the first cylindrical building on a University campus. Apart from his work as engineer and architect, he was also a painter and, in 1965, North Carolina State University held a public showing of his paintings. Waugh died at Duke Hospital of a chronic renal malfunction on February 24, 1966, at age 54.

== Partial list of works ==
- Frances Lacy Elementary School (1951)
- Waugh’s own home at 3211 Churchill Road in Raleigh, NC (1951)
- The Richard and Corinne Preston House (1952)
- The William and Bea Fleming House (1952)
- The Charles D. and Gladys Van Cleave Residence (1952)
- The Colin G. "Tim" and Shirley Thomas House (1953)
- The Joel and Shirley Colton Residence (1953)
- The Paul and Anne Bunce Residence, also known as The Aerie (1954)
- The Kerr L. White Residence (1954)
- The Kenneth Penrod Residence (1954)
- The Thomas Wohlson Farmer Residence (1954)
- The Dr. Thomas S. and Caroline Royster Guest House (1954)
- The Craig Addition, 417 Whitehead, Chapel Hill (Added a carport and garden terrace) (1955)
- The Nathan and Margaret Richardson Womack Residence (1956)
- The Bernard G. and Ruth Marck Greenberg Residence (1956)
- The Thomas and Ann Barnett House (1957)
- The Harley and Janet Shands Residence (1957)
- The Waugh House, 1301 Dixie Trail (1958)
- The Mehmet (Nick) and Virginia Uyanik House (1959)
- The Bill and Chicita Culberson House, aka Villa Pinea (1959)
- The Bernard Abrams Residence (1959)
- The Philip S. and Marylou Hendrick Residence (1960)
- Harrelson Hall, North Carolina State University campus (1961)
- The Daniel Franklin Milam Residence (1961)
- The Charles and Dorothy Jenner Residence (1962)
