= Little River High School =

Historic school building in North Carolina, United States

- U.S. National Register of Historic Places
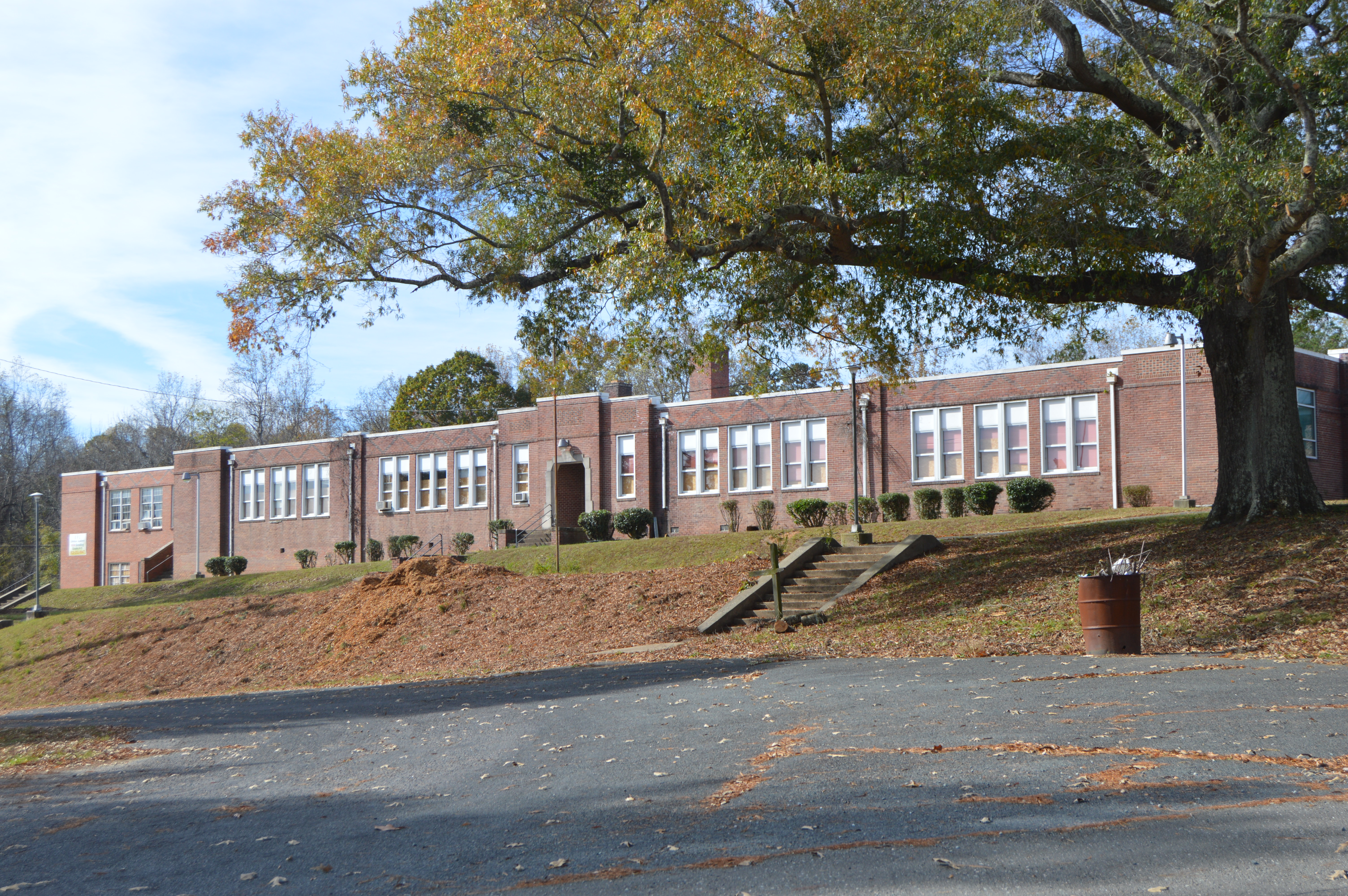
- Front of the school

- Location within North Carolina Location within the United States
- Location: 8307 North Roxboro Road, Durham, North Carolina
- Coordinates: 36°08′43″N 78°54′24″W
- Area: 36.81 acres (14.90 ha)
- Built: 1939
- Built by: C.A. Herrin
- Architect: George F. Hackney
- Architectural style: Classical revival, Modern movement
- MPS: Durham MRA
- NRHP reference No.: 100000896
- Added to NRHP: April 17, 2017

Little River High School is a historic school located on Route 501 southwest of Bahama in Durham County, North Carolina. Built in 1939, it is listed on the National Register of Historic Places.

== History ==
The school was constructed in 1939 to serve the African American students in rural northern Durham County.
