= Milton Small House =

Historic house in North Carolina, United States

- Small House
- U.S. National Register of Historic Places
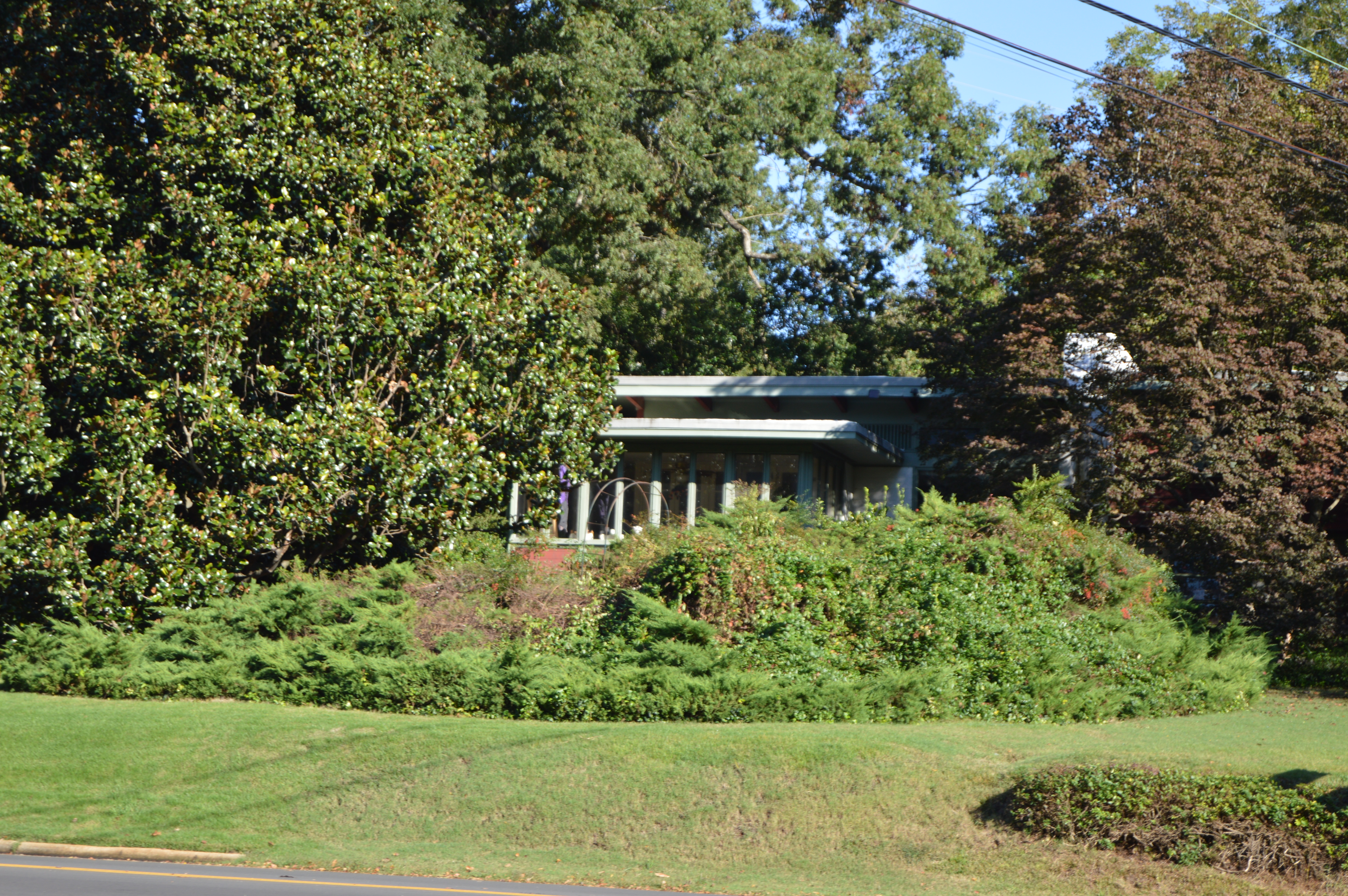
- Front

- Location within North Carolina Location within the United States
- Location: 310 Lake Boone Trail, Raleigh, North Carolina
- Coordinates: 35°48′59″N 78°39′55″W
- Area: less than one acre
- Built: 1951
- Built by: Frank Walser
- Architect: G. Milton Small
- Architectural style: Miesian
- MPS: Early Modern Architecture Associated with NCSU School of Design Faculty MPS
- NRHP reference No.: 94001086
- Added to NRHP: September 21, 1994

The Milton Small House, also known simply as the Small House, is a modernist house built on a steep hillside on the Lake Boone Trail in Raleigh, North Carolina. Built in 1951, the house was listed on the National Register of Historic Places in 1994.

From the 1940s to the 1960s, the faculty of the North Carolina State College School of Design included several modernist architects, including G. Milton Small, FAIA (1916–1992). Small had studied under Mies van der Rohe at the Illinois Institute of Technology before moving to Raleigh in 1948. He designed the Small House as his own family residence.

Small used builder Frank Walser to construct the house. Small went into business with Walser for a time, building homes in the Drewry Hills neighborhood of Raleigh.

In its original from, the Small House was "a compact T-shaped, flat-roofed frame box." Most of the home's public living spaces were combined in "one long, carefully proportioned rectangular room that opened with sliding doors onto a full-width, screened porch." The interior included a variety of exotic woods. A number of the home's design elements, including "the definition of space as roof and floor separated by exposed posts, and the large public area that opens onto semi-outdoor spaces," are considered to be typical of the Miesian style. The Raleigh Historic Development Commission has called Small House "the first structure in Raleigh to evoke the design concepts of Mies."

A 1961 addition was designed by Small, adding bedrooms to the sides of the house and separate living and dining rooms.
