= Fadum House =

Historic house in North Carolina, United States

- U.S. National Register of Historic Places
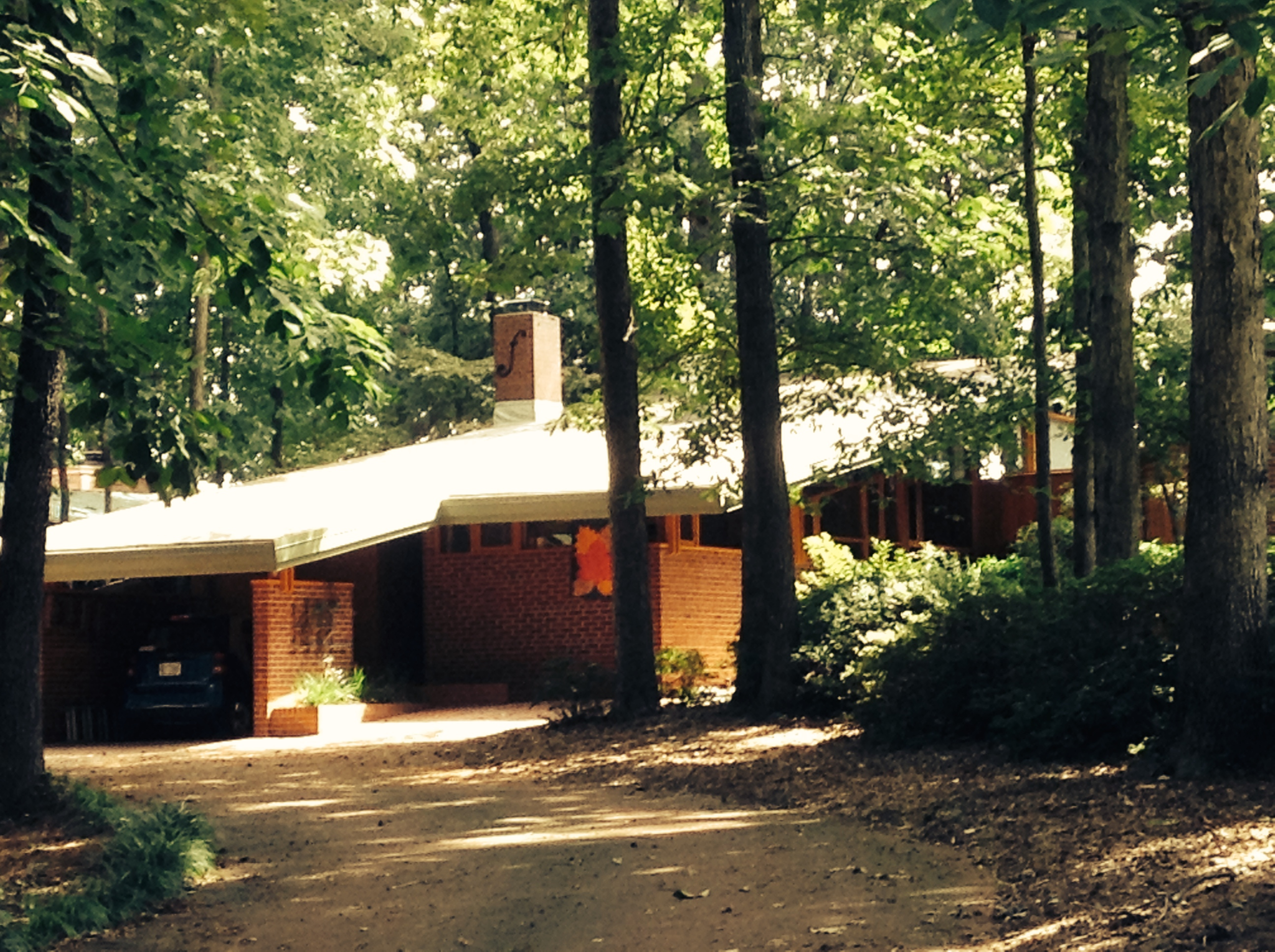
- Fadum House, September 2014

- Location within North Carolina Location within the United States
- Location: 3056 Granville Dr., Raleigh, North Carolina
- Coordinates: 35°49′19″N 78°39′51″W
- Area: 0.4 acres (0.16 ha)
- Built: 1949
- Built by: Walser, Frank A.
- Architect: Fitzgibbon, James W.
- Architectural style: Modern Movement, Wrightian, Usonian
- NRHP reference No.: 93000440
- Added to NRHP: June 10, 1993

Fadum House is a historic home which was designed by architect James W. Fitzgibbon and is located at Raleigh, Wake County, North Carolina. It was built in 1949, and is a two-story, Modern Movement-style dwelling. It is constructed of glass, brick and wood and features a double cantilevered roof on built-up wood columns.

It was listed on the National Register of Historic Places in 1993.
