= Grandview Park Music Pavilion =

- U.S. National Register of Historic Places
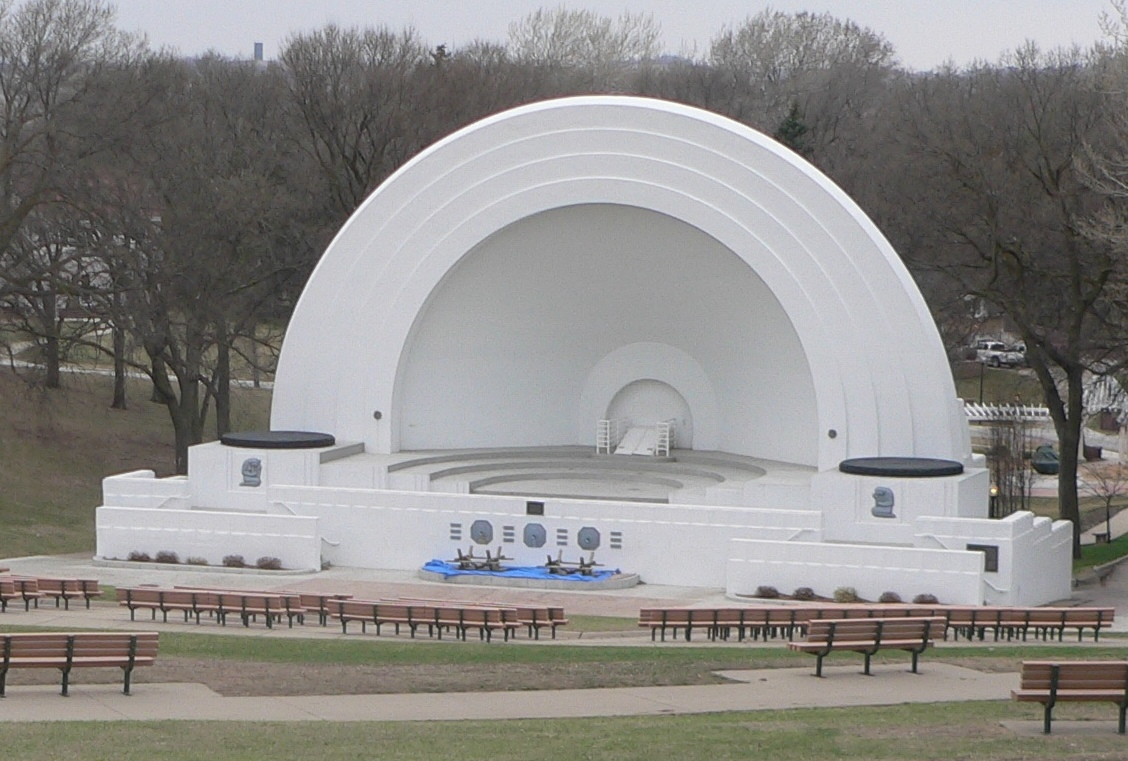

- Location within Iowa Location within the United States
- Location: Sits to the east of McDonald St. -- Entrance in 2600 block of McDonald St., Sioux City, Iowa
- Coordinates: 42°31′0.2″N 96°24′34.9″W
- Built: 1934
- Architect: Henry Leveke Kamphoefner
- Architectural style: Moderne
- NRHP reference No.: 11000053
- Added to NRHP: February 28, 2011

The Grandview Park Music Pavilion is a historic structure located in Sioux City, Iowa, United States. The Monahan Post Band raised money in 1930 to build a modest music shell in the park. Construction was already underway when the park's neighbors objected to the design. The project was put on hold as the band raised more money and sought a more suitable design. After President Franklin D. Roosevelt created the Civil Works Administration (CWA) in 1933, the city applied to have the new music shell included in Sioux City's projects. Henry L. Kamphoefner, an unknown Sioux City architect at that time, drew up the plans for the structure. The sculptural plaques on the front of the pavilion were designed by Herschel Elarth. The CWA approved the project on February 26, 1934, as CWA Project Number 217. The construction project required 52 tons of reinforcing steel, 4,200 bags of Portland cement, and 300 bags of white cement, and it was completed on October 17, 1934. Seating was constructed for 5,000 in the natural amphitheater. The pavilion was built using $47,436 from Federal Relief funds and $3,800 in materials from the city. It was dedicated in the spring of 1935. The Monahan Post Band continued to play here until 1948, when they became the Sioux City Municipal Band. They continue the summer-time tradition. The music pavilion was listed on the National Register of Historic Places in 2011.
