= École Spéciale d'Architecture =

Architecture school in Paris, France

Coordinates: 48°50′15″N 2°19′51″E

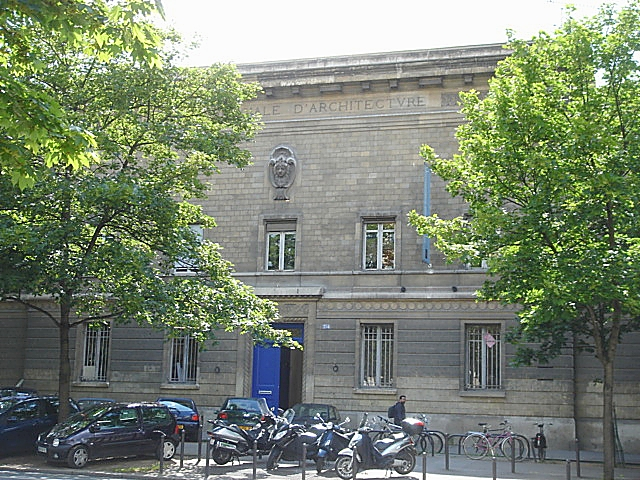
- Other name: ÉSA
- Former name: École centrale d'architecture
- Established: 1865
- Founder: Émile Trélat
- Accreditation: Conférence des Grandes écoles
- President: Marie-Christine Labourdette
- Director: Marie-Hélène Contal
- Location: 254 Boulevard Raspail, Paris, France
- Language: French
- Website: www.esa-paris.fr

The École spéciale d'architecture (formerly the École Centrale d'Architecture) is a private higher education institution for architecture based in Paris.

The diploma from the École spéciale d'architecture (DESA), recognized by the State since 1934, entitles the holder to registration with the Order of Architects

== History ==
The École centrale d'architecture was founded in 1865 by engineer Emile Trélat as reaction against the educational monopoly of Beaux-Arts architecture. It was endorsed by Eugène Viollet-le-Duc, a childhood friend, who after many infructuous attempts at reforming the École des Beaux-Arts had imagined the idea in 1863. Viollet le Duc provided many of the educational precepts and became one of its original stockholders, along with other notables including : Ferdinand de Lesseps, Anatole de Baudot, Eugène Flachat, Dupont de l'Eure, Jean-Baptiste André Godin, and Émile Muller.

Even at its beginning it included innovative courses such as domestic hygiene and urban public health. It was officially recognized as providing "public utility" in 1870, and recognized by the state as an institution of higher education in 1934.

== Education ==
Today, the school issues the Architecte DE degree awarding a master's degree in architecture, and the Architecte DESA, HMONP degree, recognized by the European Union allowing architects to open their own architectural practice, and is organized into five departments:

Architecture and Environment
Visual Arts and Representation
History and Human Science
Building Science and Technology
Computer applications and Communications.

It is a "free school" governed in part by its students and alumni. Major decisions are taken by the administrative council and the general assembly consisting of students, alumni, teaching staff and administrators. It has an international exchange student program with the Cal Poly Pomona College of Environmental Design, in California, United States, and with the University of Cincinnati College of Design, Architecture, Art, and Planning, in Ohio, United States.

== Notable people ==
=== Alumni ===
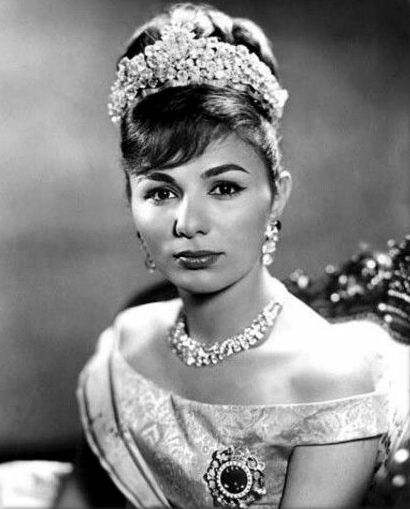
Farah Pahlavi

- Ricardo Larraín Bravo
- Jon Condoret
- Julio Dormal
- Robert Mallet-Stevens
- Farah Pahlavi
- Auguste Perret
- Henri Prost
- Vartan Hovanessian
- René Sergent

=== Faculty ===
- Albert Besson
- Paul Virilio
