= Mae and Philip Rothstein House =

Historic house in North Carolina, United States

- U.S. National Register of Historic Places
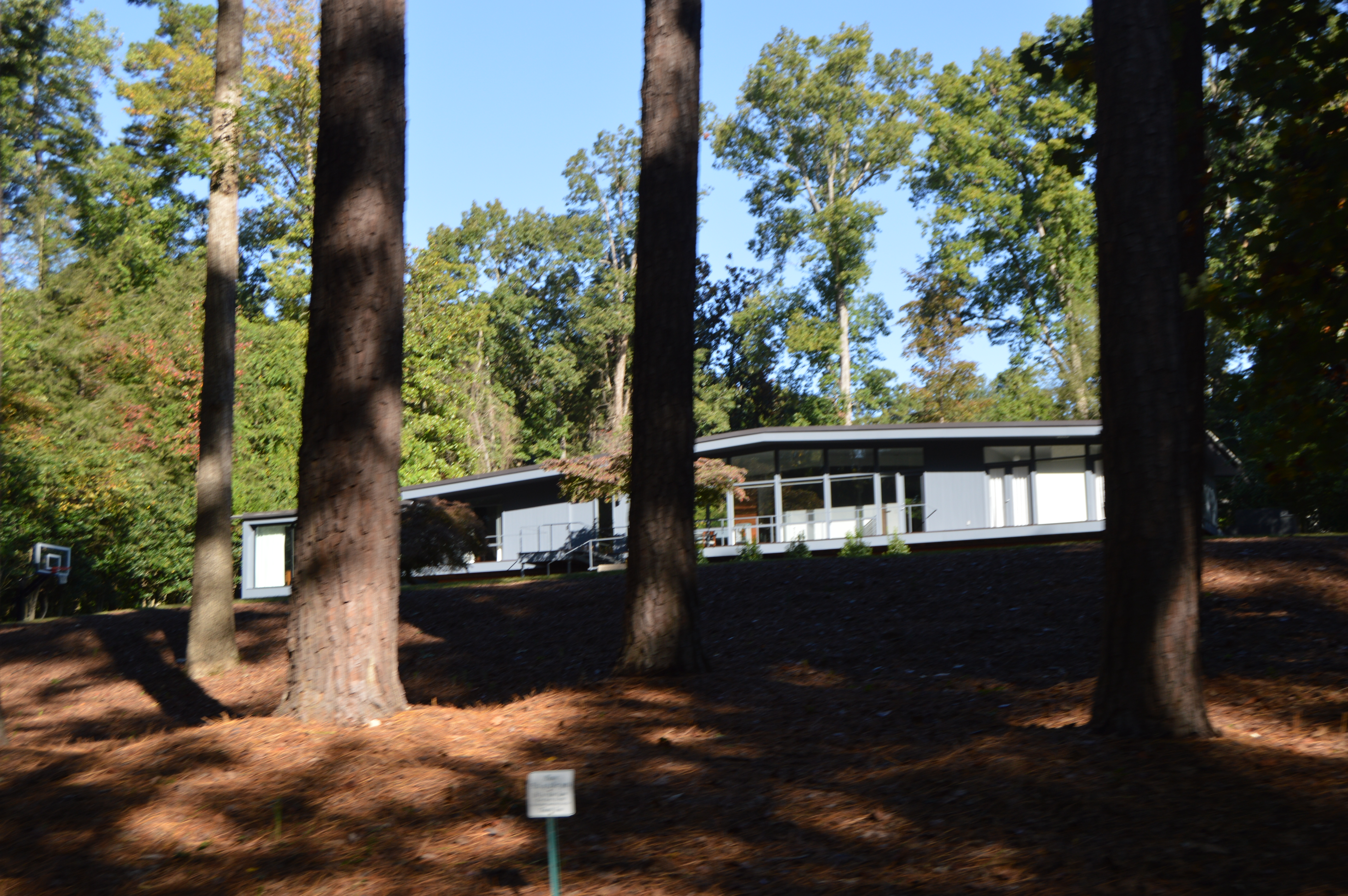
- Street view

- Location within North Carolina Location within the United States
- Location: 912 Williamson Dr., Raleigh, North Carolina
- Coordinates: 35°48′3″N 78°39′6″W
- Area: 1 acre (0.40 ha)
- Built: 1959
- Built by: Frank Walser
- Architect: G. Milton Small, Jr.
- Architectural style: International Style
- MPS: Early Modern Architecture Associated with NCSU School of Design Faculty MPS
- NRHP reference No.: 05000321
- Added to NRHP: April 15, 2005

Mae and Philip Rothstein House is a historic home located at Raleigh, Wake County, North Carolina. It was built in 1959, and is a one-story, International Style dwelling measuring 80 feet by 27 feet. It has a low-pitched, gable-front roof, with a deep overhang. It features three-tiered floor-to-ceiling windows.

It was listed on the National Register of Historic Places in 2005.
