= North Carolina Modernist Houses =

North Carolina Modernist Houses (NCMH) is a 501(c)(3) nonprofit educational archive for Modernist architecture. The mission of the organization is to document, preserve, and promote Modernist houses. Founded in 2007, the organization became a nonprofit in 2009 and operated as Triangle Modernist Houses. In 2013, it changed names to NCModernist to reflect a statewide focus. Because of the NC State University School of Design (now College of Design), the state has about 5000 Modernist houses starting in the late 1930s. George Smart is the founder and executive director. NCMH is recognized nationally for its accomplishments with 18 local, state, and national awards for leadership in preservation. In 2015, NCMH created US Modernist to house its national online archives.

== Organization initiatives ==
=== The George Matsumoto Prize ===
The George Matsumoto Prize is an architecture competition featuring jury awards and an online public vote. The competition was created in 2012 in honor of George Matsumoto, one of the founding faculty members of North Carolina State University's School of Design. The prize is aimed towards current architects and clients who continue the Modernism movement.

=== Project BauHow ===
NCMH's Project BauHow helps drafting teachers and student in rural NC high schools. Developed in 2013, Project BauHow has given away over 400 desktop Computer Aided Design (CAD) computers and monitors as of September 2016 for students to take home and keep. Later, with class instruction, they can participate in a design competition with scholarships to the NC State College of Design's Design Camp. The program was suspended during COVID.

=== NCMH Legal Defense Fund ===
The NCMH Legal Defense Fund (LDF) provides technical assistance, funding for legal representation, and other support services to endangered Modernist houses in North Carolina. The LDF advocates for North Carolina's legacy of Modernist residential architecture. Their most recent case was the Cherry-Gordon House in Raleigh NC which ended in a victory for the homeowners and LDF.
