= George Poland House =

Historic house in North Carolina, United States

- U.S. National Register of Historic Places
- Location within North Carolina Location within the United States
- Location: 502 John Jones Rd., near Bahama, North Carolina
- Coordinates: 36°8′43″N 78°53′41″W
- Area: less than one acre
- Built: 1956
- Built by: Walser, Raymond Frank
- Architect: Matsumoto, George
- Architectural style: International Style
- NRHP reference No.: 04001287
- Added to NRHP: December 4, 2004

George Poland House is a historic home located near Bahama, Durham County, North Carolina. It was designed by architect George Matsumoto and built in 1956 in the International Style. It was originally located at 3929 Arrow Drive in Raleigh, North Carolina and moved to its present location in 2001. It is a rectangular, one-story, flat-roofed dwelling on a full basement. The house features cantilevered floor and ceiling beams, a front entry platform, a full-facade covered rear porch, and an open elevated wraparound walkway.

It was listed on the National Register of Historic Places in 2004.
