= Bahama, North Carolina =

- Unincorporated community
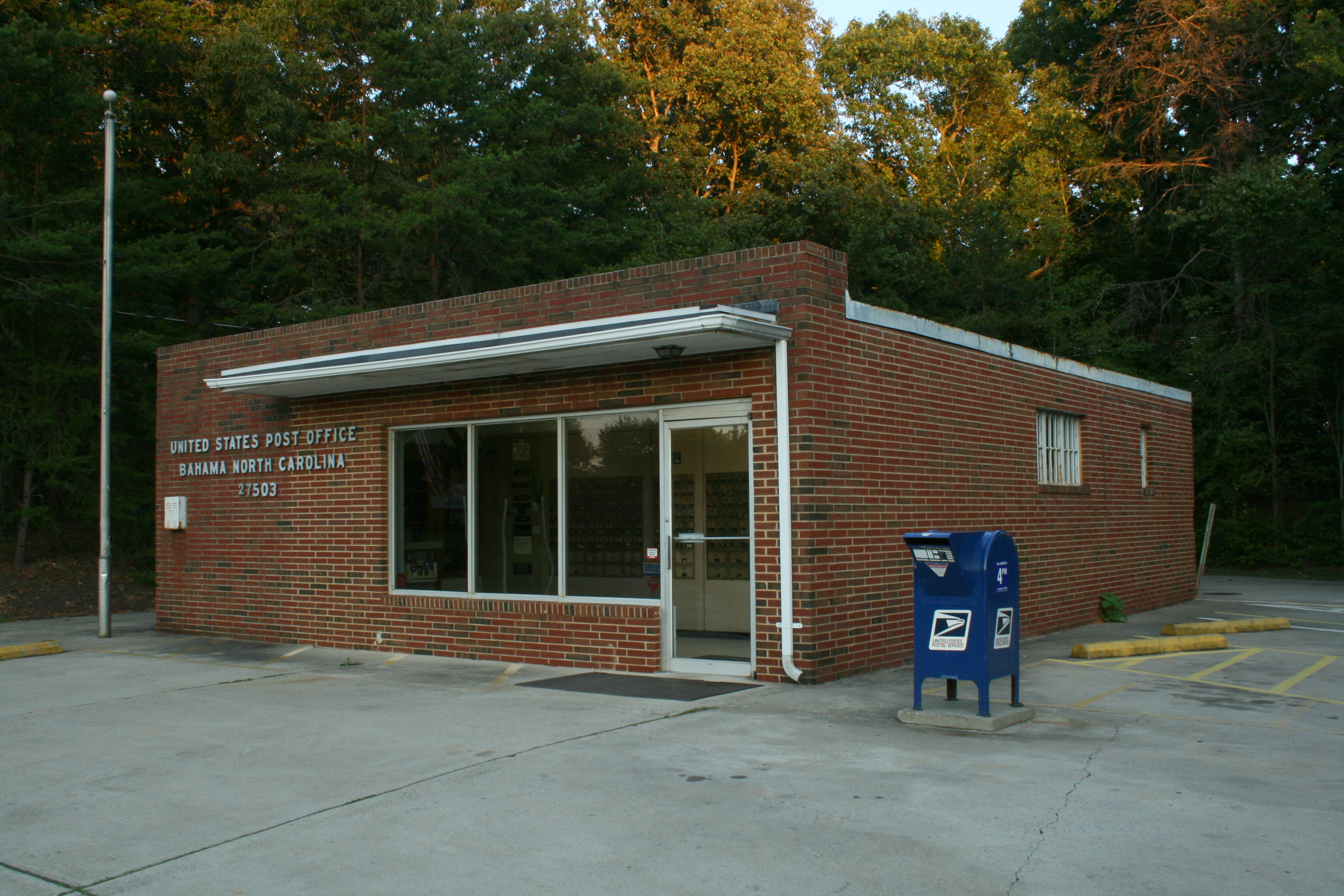
- Bahama post office

- Location within the state of North Carolina
- Coordinates: 36°9′58″N 78°52′36″W
- Country: United States
- State: North Carolina
- County: Durham
- Time zone: UTC-5 (Eastern (EST))
  - Summer (DST): UTC-4 (EDT)

Bahama (/bəˈheɪmə/ bə-HAY-mə) is an unincorporated community in northern Durham County, North Carolina, United States.

== History ==
Prior to European colonization, the present location of Bahama and the surrounding upper Neuse River basin were home to native peoples including the Eno, Shakori, and Adshusheer.

The origins of the town of Bahama can be traced back to the construction of a log meetinghouse which was the first of several structures that would house what is now Mount Bethel United Methodist Church; the meetinghouse was likely built in the early 1780s. The settlement was subsequently known by various names, including Balltown, Round Hill, and Hunkadora. The latter two names specifically referred to the community centered on the post office founded by William Horner in 1832. In 1891 the town, then known as Hunkadora, was given the new name of Bahama, a portmanteau of the names of three families in the area: (Ba)ll, (Ha)rris, and (Ma)ngum. A new railroad station came to eclipse the post office as the center of activity.

== Demographics ==
Bahama's Zip Code Tabulation Area (Zip Code 27503) has a population of 3,304 as of the 2000 census. The population is 50.2% male and 49.8% female. About 87.7% of the population is white, 10.3% African-American, 0.2% American Indian, 0.5% Asian, 1.2% Hispanic, and 0.6% of other races. 0.6% of people are two or more races. There is one native Hawaiian and/or Pacific Islander.

The median household income is $55,272, with 4.7% of the population living below the poverty line.

== Education ==
Bahama is home to Mangum Elementary School (formerly Mangum Primary School). Mangum Elementary is a Durham Public School (Kindergarten-5th grade).

== Historic Markers ==
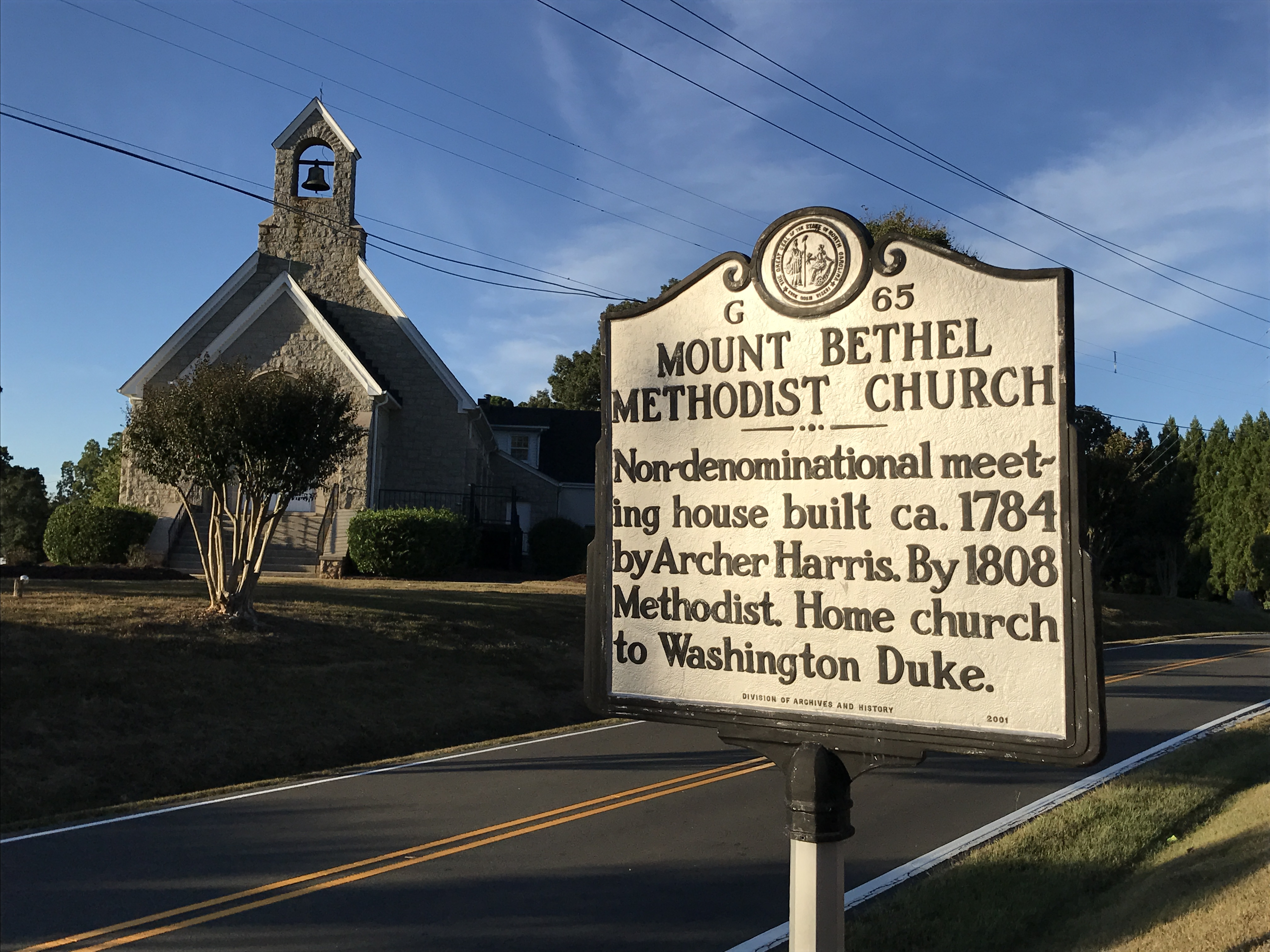
Mount Bethel Methodist Church

- Mount Bethel Church - NC Highway Marker G-65
  "Non-denominational meeting house built ca. 1784 by Archer Harris. By 1808 Methodist. Home church to Washington Duke."
- Willie P. Mangum - NC Highway Marker G-28
  "Member of United States Senate for 18 years and president pro tempore, 1842-45; Congressman; Whig party leader. Home site, grave, 10 mi. N.E."
- Stephen B. Weeks - NC Highway Marker G-50
  "Historian, bibliographer, collector of North Carolina books and manuscripts, professor at Trinity College, 1891-93. Grave 6 mi. N.E."
- William B. Umstead - NC Highway Marker G-68
  "Governor, 1953-54, U.S. Senator, congressman; Democratic leader; and lawyer. Birthplace is 6 1/2 mi., grave 5 1/2 mi., N.E."
- Trading Path - NC Highway Marker G-32
  "Colonial trading route, dating from 17th century, from Petersburg, Virginia, to Catawba and Waxhaw Indians in Carolina passed nearby."

== Historic places ==
The following sites in Bahama are listed in the National Register of Historic Places:

- Adolphus W. Umstead House
- George Poland House
- Hampton-Ellis Farm
- D.C. Umstead Store and House
- Hardscrabble
- Marcus Tilley House
- Little River High School
- Walnut Hall

== Notable people ==
- William B. Umstead - U.S. Senator and governor of North Carolina
- Washington Duke - philanthropist, farmer, businessman
- Scott Riggs - NASCAR driver
- Layne Riggs - NASCAR driver
- John P. Kee - American gospel artist, who has often stated that he was “born in Durham, North Carolina; outside of the county line”
