= Hardscrabble (Bahama, North Carolina) =

Historic house in North Carolina, United States

- U.S. National Register of Historic Places
- Location within North Carolina Location within the United States
- Location: North side of SR 1002, 1.2 miles (1.9 km) west of junction with SR 1003, near Bahama, North Carolina
- Coordinates: 36°8′1″N 78°57′36″W
- Area: 8 acres (3.2 ha)
- Built: 1779
- Architectural style: Georgian, Federal
- NRHP reference No.: 72000960
- Added to NRHP: January 20, 1972

Hardscrabble, also known as Pleasant Grove, is a historic plantation home located near Bahama, Durham County, North Carolina. It consists of two houses, one Georgian and one Federal, covered by a common cross-gable roof in the late-19th century. The Georgian was built about 1779 and the Federal section in the 1790s.

It was listed on the National Register of Historic Places in 1972.
