= George Matsumoto =

Japanese-American architect

George Matsumoto (July 16, 1922 – June 28, 2016) was a Japanese-American architect and educator who is known for his modernist designs.

== Early life and education ==
George Matsumoto was born in 1922 in San Francisco, California. He grew up in San Francisco's Nihonmachi Japantown, attended Lowell High School, and took Japanese classes at Kinmon Gakuen. Matsumoto attended the University of California at Berkeley in architecture, but due to his internment at Poston during World War II (along with other Japanese Americans), he completed his undergraduate education at Washington University in St. Louis. He earned his graduate degree from Cranbrook Academy of Art in Michigan, studying under Eliel Saarinen.

== Career ==
Completing his graduate studies in 1945, Matsumoto joined the firm of Skidmore, Owings, and Merrill in Chicago and in 1946, joined the firm of Saarinen and Swanson. While with Saarinen and Swanson, he, along with Terry Waugh and David Greer, won the "Better Chicago Contest" with a cash prize of $10,000. Their winning entry was a comprehensive regional plan for the Chicago metropolitan area.

Following a year of private practice in Kansas City, Missouri, Matsumoto joined the department of architecture at the University of Oklahoma as an instructor. A year later, he moved with the head of the school of architecture, Henry L. Kamphoefner, to the new School of Design at North Carolina State University.

Kamphoefner was appointed as the first dean of the School of Design and he brought with him several students and faculty from the University of Oklahoma. During his tenure at the School of Design Matsumoto won over thirty awards for his housing designs and his achievements were published internationally. Some of his most well-known and acclaimed designs in North Carolina include the George Poland House in Raleigh, N.C., the Matsumoto Residence, also in Raleigh, N.C., the E.M. Lipman Residence in Richmond, V.A., the Milton Julian Residence in Chapel Hill, N.C., the J. Gregory Poole Resident in Raleigh, N.C., which he designed with G. Milton Small Jr., the Ritcher House in Raleigh, N.C., which he designed with Kamphoefner, and the E.K. Thrower Residence in Sedgefield (Greensboro), N.C. He also designed and built the home of Kirkwood Floyd Adams Sr., later Mayor of Roanoke Rapids, N.C., and his wife Sarah Chaney Adams located on White Ave. Mrs. Adams later remembered Matsumoto as "a talented practitioner yet, so compassionate". He treated all the people associated with the house with respect and they loved him." Matsumoto's houses are distinguished by their simplicity, precision and domestic application of the International Style.

After leaving the School of Design in 1961, Matsumoto returned to California to teach at the University of California, Berkeley and later opened a successful practice that did work in commercial, educational and recreational work, as well as campus and community planning. He was elected a fellow of the American Institute of Architects in 1973.

Matsumoto modernist houses share common characteristics, including; a flat roof, an unobstructed internal view from one end of the house to the other, terrazzo floors, natural woods for walls and ceilings, mahogany cabinetry, large windows in the rear, and small but functional kitchens.

== Death and legacy ==
Matsumoto died on June 28, 2016, at age 93. He was preceded in death by his wife of 53 years, Kimi Nao (1923–2005). Together they had five children, Mari, Kiyo, Kei, Kenneth and Miye Matsumoto.

Since 2016, a nonprofit organization named North Carolina Modernist Houses (NCMH) has an annual Matsumoto Prize, in honor of George Matsumoto.
