= Henry L. Kamphoefner =

American architect

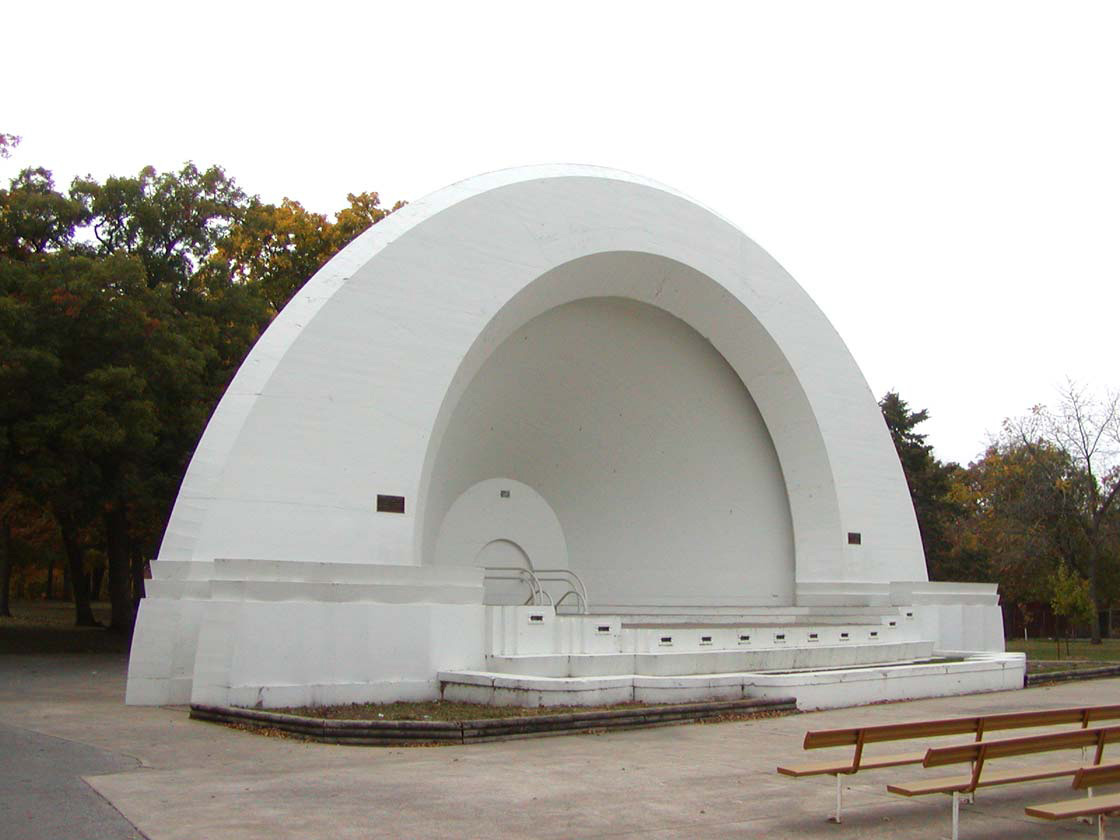
Oleson Park Music Pavilion.

Henry Leveke Kamphoefner (May 5, 1907 – February 14, 1990) was a champion of Modernist architecture and is most well known for bringing modern architecture to the southern United States and North Carolina in particular, as the first Dean of the School (now College) of Design at North Carolina State University.

== Biography ==
Henry Leveke Kamphoefner was born in Des Moines, Iowa on May 5, 1907. He graduated from the University of Illinois Urbana-Champaign with a Bachelor of Science degree in architecture in 1930. In 1931, he received a Master of Science degree in architecture from Columbia University, and in 1932, received a Certificate of Architecture from the Beaux Arts Institute of Design in New York City.

From 1932 until 1936, Kamphoefner practiced architecture privately. During that period, his notable work included the design of a municipal bandshell in Grandview Park, Sioux City, Iowa, which was commissioned in 1934 under the Depression-era Civilian Works Administration as CWA Project 217. In 1936 and 1937, he worked for the Rural Resettlement Administration in Washington, D.C. as an associate architect. In 1937, he became a professor of architecture at the University of Oklahoma, working there until 1948. During the summers of 1938, 1939, and 1941, Kamphoefner also was employed as an architect for the United States Navy. His 1938 Oleson Park Music Pavilion in Fort Dodge, Iowa is on the National Register of Historic Places. Kamphoefner was also a visiting professor at the University of Michigan during the summer of 1947.

In 1948, Kamphoefner became the first dean of the North Carolina State College School of Design. When he moved to North Carolina State College, he brought several colleagues and students from the University of Oklahoma with him, including George Matsumoto and Terry Waugh. He created strict admissions policies and instituted a distinguished visitors program, which brought in architects such as Frank Lloyd Wright to lecture at the school. Kamphoefner was a modernist architect and so were his colleagues. He encouraged them to build modernist style houses in the Raleigh area, in order to create interest in the community in having their own modernist houses. Kamphoefner's own house, the Henry L. Kamphoefner House in Raleigh, N.C., was one of the residences he designed. Other well-known buildings designed by Kamphoefner include the Ritcher House in Raleigh, N.C. and the McEvare Residence in Southern Pines, N.C. Kamphoefner remained as the dean at the School of Design until 1973, when he retired and was named dean emeritus. He continued teaching until 1979. From 1979 to 1981, he served as a distinguished visiting professor at Meredith College in Raleigh, N.C.

Kamphoefner received several awards and honors for his professional work, including an honorary Doctorate of Fine Arts from Morningside College (1967); an honorary Doctorate of Laws from Ball State University (1972); an award in Joint Achievement for Lasting Achievement in Architectural Education (1977); and a North Carolina Award for Achievement in the Fine Arts (1978). His 1934 building, the Grandview Music Pavilion in Sioux City, Iowa, was selected by the Royal Institute of British Architects as one of "America's Outstanding Buildings of the Post-War Period." Kamphoefner Hall at North Carolina State University was named in his honor.

Henry Kamphoefner died in Raleigh, North Carolina on February 14, 1990.

== Works ==
- Henry L. Kamphoefner House, 3060 Granville Dr., Raleigh, North Carolina (Kamphoefner, Henry L., et al.), listed on the U.S. National Register of Historic Places (NRHP)
- Oleson Park Music Pavilion, 1400 Oleson Park Ave., Fort Dodge, Iowa (Kamphoefner, Henry), listed on the NRHP
- Sioux City Municipal Bandshell, Grandview Park, Sioux City, Iowa
