= National Register of Historic Places listings in Falls Church, Virginia =

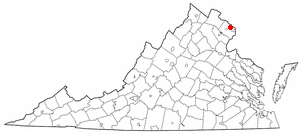
Location of Falls Church in Virginia

This list of the National Register of Historic Places listings in Falls Church, Virginia, includes six properties and districts on the National Register of Historic Places, including one National Historic Landmark, in the independent city of Falls Church, Virginia, United States.

This National Park Service list is complete through NPS recent listings posted June 20, 2025.

== Current listings ==
Latitude and longitude coordinates are linked to Google Maps.

	Name on the Register	Image	Date listed	Location	Description
1	Benjamin Banneker: SW-9 Intermediate Boundary Stone	Benjamin Banneker: SW-9 Intermediate Boundary Stone	May 11, 1976 (#76002094)	18th and Van Buren Sts. 38°52′59″N 77°09′33″W	Extends into Arlington County
2	Birch House	Birch House	October 26, 1977 (#77001534)	312 E. Broad St. 38°52′45″N 77°10′01″W	
3	Cherry Hill	Cherry Hill	July 26, 1973 (#73002210)	312 Park Ave. 38°53′09″N 77°10′24″W	
4	Falls Church	Falls Church	February 26, 1970 (#70000870)	115 E. Fairfax St. 38°52′51″N 77°10′17″W	
5	Mount Hope	Mount Hope	October 4, 1984 (#84000037)	203 Oak St. 38°53′10″N 77°10′54″W	A brick, Victorian farmhouse built in 1870 by Irish immigrant William Duncan. The home is attached to an earlier structure, built around 1830.
6	West Cornerstone	West Cornerstone	February 1, 1991 (#91000014)	West side of Meridian St., south of the junction with Williamsburg Boulevard; 38°53′36″N 77°10′20″W	

== See also ==
- List of National Historic Landmarks in Virginia
- National Register of Historic Places listings in Virginia
