= Meridian High School (Virginia) =

Location
- 121 Mustang Alley; Falls Church, Virginia 22043; 38°53′52″N 77°11′31″W

Information
- School type: Public high school
- Founded: 1952
- School district: Falls Church City Public Schools
- Principal: Peter Laub
- Grades: 9–12
- Enrollment: 845 (2019-20)
- Campus: Suburban
- Colors: Red, white, and black
- Mascot: Mustang
- Feeder schools: Mary Ellen Henderson Middle School
- Athletic conferences: Virginia High School League; AA Dulles District [lacrosse, swimming]
- Website: https://mhs.fccps.org

Meridian High School (MHS), formerly George Mason High School, is a comprehensive public high school that serves the independent City of Falls Church. The school, which serves some 850 students in grades 9–12, is the sole high school in the Falls Church City Public Schools system. Opened in 1952, it is a hub of city activity for its facilities and athletic fields.

Until January 2014, MHS was located outside the boundaries of Falls Church, in Idylwood, an unincorporated area of Fairfax County, Virginia. In 2014, a 38-acre (15 ha; 150,000 m^{2}) parcel of land, including the school, was transferred to Falls Church City as part of the Fairfax County Water Authority's purchase of the Falls Church Water System.

The school ranks gold in U.S. News & World Report's Best High Schools Ranking for 2020; Meridian High School (formerly George Mason) ranks #16 among all schools in Virginia and #649 in the United States.

== Demographics ==
Meridian High School's racial breakdown in the 2020-2021 class was 59% White (non-Hispanic), 6% Asian or Pacific Islander, 12% Hispanic, 4% Black, and 19% two or more races. For comparison, the demographics of the city are: 79.37% White, 3.38% Hispanics of any race, 6.5% Asian, 4.9% African American, 0.16% Native American, 0.0% Pacific Islander, 2.01% from other races, and 3.68% from two or more races.

== History ==
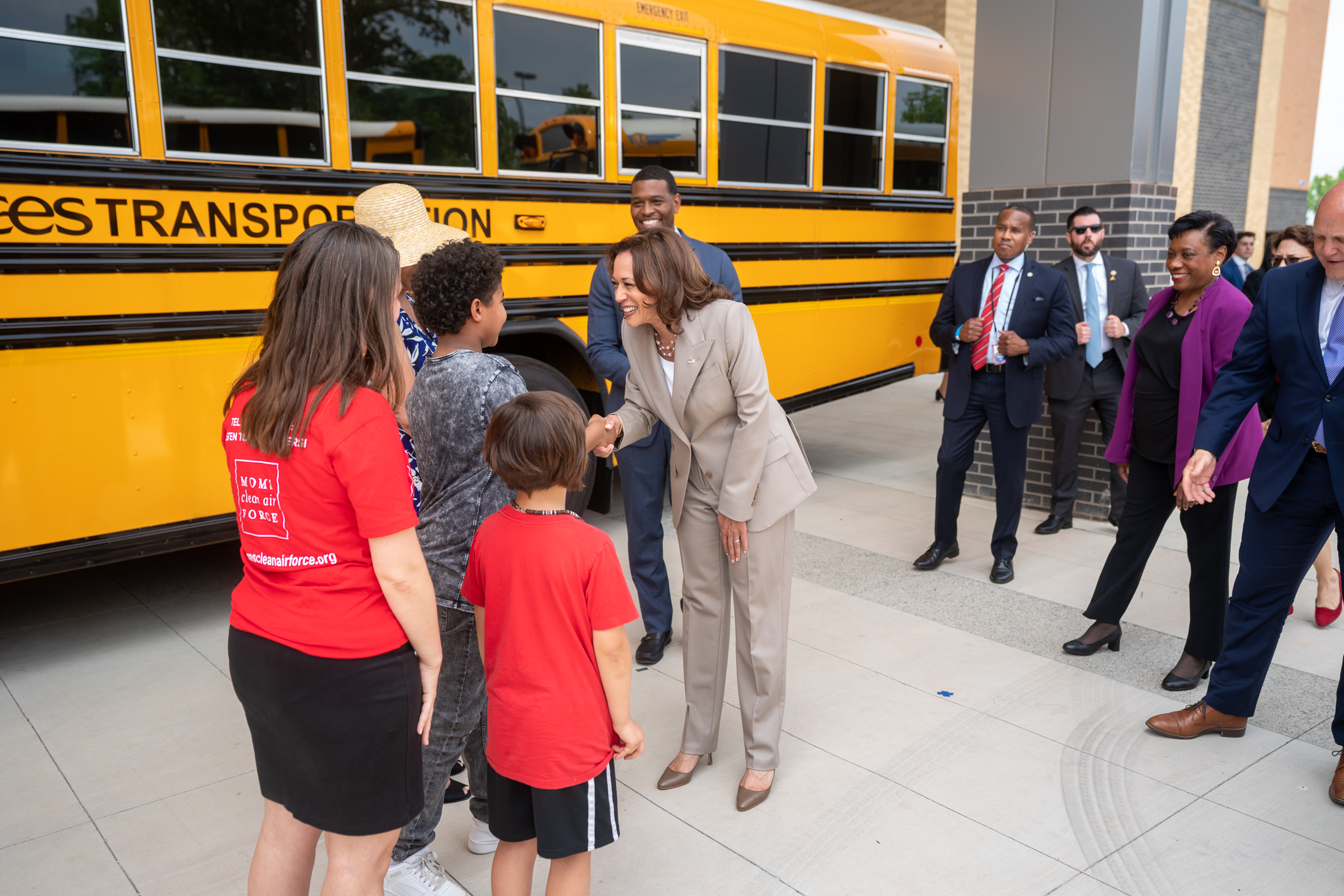
Vice President Kamala Harris greets children during a tour of electric school buses in May 2022 at Meridian High School.

MHS was built on the site of a single-room school house that burned down in 1857. After the fire, the land sat empty until Falls Church was founded as an independent city in 1948, when residents sought greater control over their local school system, which, at the time, was segregated by race. MHS was opened in 1952.

In 1981, the school became the first in Virginia to use the International Baccalaureate program.

A design for a new main building was unveiled in 2017 and construction began in 2019. The new LEED-certified building opened to students in 2021, and the original was demolished.

In December 2020, the FCCPS School Board voted to rename George Mason High School and its counterpart Thomas Jefferson Elementary School due to their namesakes' association with American slavery. After a period of deliberation and public comment, the school board selected Meridian High School as a replacement name.

== Sports and activities ==
- VHSL Scholastic Bowl Team - Bull Run District champions for 18 of 19 years between 2000 and 2018, receiving many region and conference titles in those years, seven-time Virginia A State Champions, including four straight years (2002, 2003, 2007, 2010, 2011, 2012, 2013), and five-time state runner-up (2004, 2006, 2009, 2014, 2015). 2011 NAQT national high school small school division quiz bowl champions after a third-place finish in 2007 and fifth in 2010.
- Baseball - Bull Run District Champions 2010, 2019
- Boys Basketball - Virginia A D2 State runners-up 2012
- Girls Basketball - Virginia A D2 State Champions (2008–2009, 2009–2010, 2011–2012); Bull Run District runners-up and Region B champions 2007–2008, 2011–12 season.
- Cross Country - Girls State Champions (2008, 2009, 2010, 2011), Girls State Runner-Up (2007, 2005), third (2006), Boys District and Region champs and 4th in state in 2010, sixth in State (2007), Boys District and State Champions (2011)
- American football - Bull Run District Champions 2006
- Golf - Bull Run District Regular Season Champions 2006, 2007
- Field Hockey
- Ice Hockey
- Boys Lacrosse - Dulles District champions, 2008
- Girls Lacrosse - Dulles District runners-up, 2010 Dulles District Champions 2016, 4A State Runner-ups 2016, 4A State Champions 2017
- Boys Soccer - Group A runners-up 2005, 2011. Group A State Champions 2000, 2002, 2004, 2009, 2010, 2013. Group 2A State Champions 2014, 2015, 2016, 2018. Group 3 State Champions 2021. The 2015 team- Ranked #1 in Region I and #2 in Nation by NSCAA. 2016- Ranked #10 in Nation by Max Preps.
- Girls Soccer - Group A Champions 2002, 2004, 2008, 2009, 2010, 2011, 2012, 2013. Group 2A State Champions 2014, 2015, 2016, 2017, 2018.
- Softball District champions 2012
- Boys Swimming - Bull Run District and Region B Champions 2007, 2008, 2009, 2010, 2012. District and State Champions, 2015.
- Girls Swimming - Bull Run District and Region B Champions 2009, 2012. District Champions, 2014. District, Region and State Champions, 2015
- Boys Tennis - Fourteen-time Group A State Champions: 1986–1991, 2001, 2004–2007, 2010–2012.
- Girls Tennis - Bull Run District and Region B Champions 2006–2008, 2010.
- Track and Field - Girls team third in State in 2007 and 2010, three school records and counting from the class of 2008 runners, girls team second in state (2008). Six individual state championships since 2005.
- Volleyball - Bull Run District Champions 2015, Conference 35 Champions 2016, Bull Run District co-champions and Region 2B Runner-ups 2018, Northwestern District Champions 2019, Northwestern District and Region 3B Champions 2020-2021.
- Wrestling
- FIRST Robotics Competition Team 1418, Vae Victis - Frequent attendee of FIRST World Championship. Top FIRST Robotics Competition team in Chesapeake district in 2016.
- Band - Earned "Superior" scores at District X Festival for the past twelve years, the past five of which were earned playing Grade VI music. Also, the music department earned the VBODA "Blue Ribbon Award" for eleven years in a row, 2000–2011.
- Chorus - Consistently earns "Superior" and "Excellent" scores at District X Festival.
- Theater - The George Mason High School Theater annually performs a Fall musical and a Spring play.

== Notable alumni ==
- Grant Sabatier (2003), author
- Nina Willner (1978), nonfiction author
- Molly Henneberg (1991), reporter
