= Falls Church City Public Schools =

School division in Falls Church, Virginia

Address
- 150 S. Washington Street, Ste 400 Falls Church, Virginia, 22046; United States

District information
- Type: Public school division
- Grades: Pre-K–12
- Superintendent: Dr. Terry J. Dade
- School board: Kathleen Tysse - Chair; Anne Sherwood - Vice-Chair; Dr. Jerrod Anderson; Bethany Henderson; MaryKate "MK" Hughes; Amie Murphy; Lori Silverman; Sanaa Washiko - Student Representative
- NCES District ID: 5101290

Students and staff
- Enrollment: 2,742 (March, 2025)
- Staff: 664 (March, 2025)
- Student–teacher ratio: 12.31

Other information
- Website: www.fccps.org

Falls Church City Public Schools (FCCPS) is a public school district that serves the City of Falls Church, Virginia. It is a PreK-12 IB World School division, meaning all schools in the district are IB-certified.

The school division's five schools served 2,742 students in the 2024-25 school year. The on-time graduation rate is 99.5 percent. The 2024 SAT score average was 1247.

== History ==
In 1948, the Virginia General Assembly approved Falls Church's request to form an independent city. FCCPS became an independent school system the following year, on June 27, 1949, when the Virginia State Board of Education authorized its separation from the Fairfax County school system.

== Schools ==
- Jessie Thackrey Preschool (pre-K)
- Mount Daniel Elementary (K-2)
- Oak Street Elementary School (Grades 3-5) (formerly Thomas Jefferson)
- Mary Ellen Henderson Middle School (Grades 6-8)
- Meridian High School (Virginia) (Grades 9-12) (formerly George Mason)

== See also ==
- List of school divisions in Virginia
