= Molly Henneberg =

American journalist

- Born: Mary Janne Henneberg; August 13, 1973 (age 52)
- Education: Vanderbilt University (BA)
- Occupation: Television journalist
- Spouse: Chris Nagel
- Children: 1

Mary Janne "Molly" Henneberg (born August 13, 1973) is an American former news reporter for the Fox News Channel. She had joined the network in 2001 and was based at the network's Washington, D.C. bureau. Henneberg left Fox News in December 2014. On October 3, 2015, she reported again on Fox News.

== Biography ==
During her career at Fox News Channel, she has been a White House correspondent and covered the 2004 Presidential campaign. In 2003 she reported from Baghdad during Operation Iraqi Freedom. Recently, she presented live coverage of Hurricane Katrina from Mississippi and reported on the hurricane recovery efforts from Louisiana.

Prior to joining Fox News Channel, Henneberg was the medical reporter for WBRE-TV in Wilkes Barre/Scranton, Pennsylvania. She was also an early evening anchor and medical reporter at WPBN-TV in Traverse City, Michigan, and began her career as a reporter for WHAG-TV in Hagerstown, Maryland.

She is a 1991 graduate of George Mason High School in Falls Church, Virginia and received a bachelor's degree in English and elementary education from Vanderbilt University in 1995.

Henneberg grew up in Falls Church and is a member of the independent Anglican Falls Church, along with her parents Daniel and Jackie, younger brother Robert, younger sister Amanda, younger brother William, husband Chris, and best friend Allison Yates Gaskins. She also is an obsessive Washington Football Team (formerly Redskins) fan.

On Saturday, July 12, 2008, she married United States Marine Corps lawyer Captain Chris Nagel at the Falls Church. On August 31, 2011, Henneberg announced on Fox and Friends that she and her husband were expecting a child "and new [then-]Redskins fan." The due date was Christmas Day, and the couple intended to name their daughter Jaqueline in honor of Molly's mother.
