= Falls Church Airpark =

Falls Church Airpark (closed)
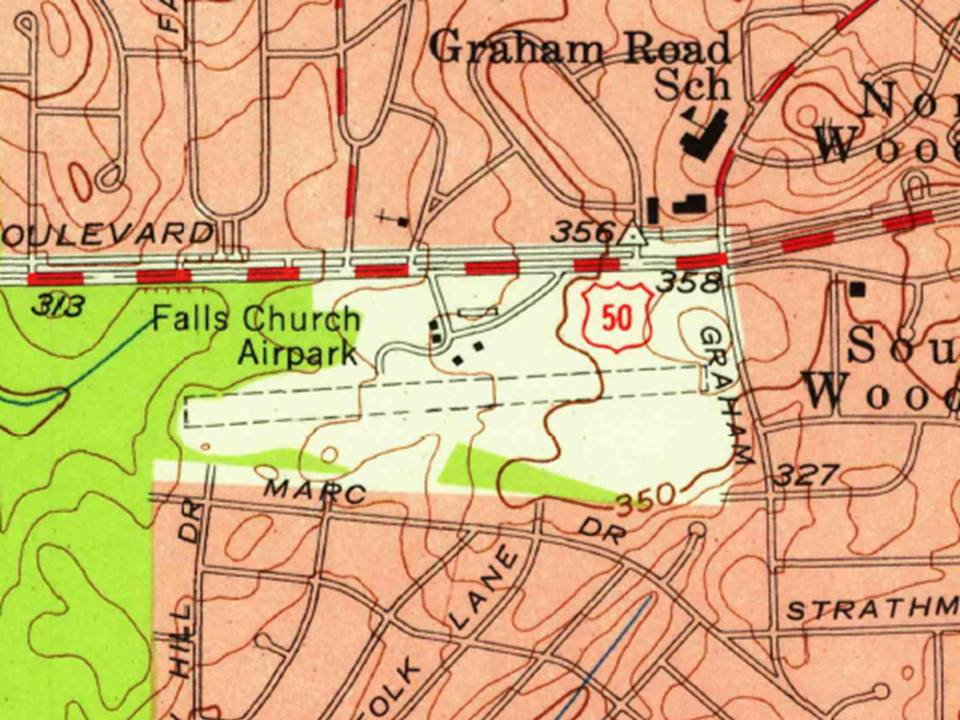
- USGS Topographic Map, 1955
- IATA: none; ICAO: none

Summary
- Airport type: General aviation
- Owner: Falls Church Airpark, Inc.
- Operator: Ashby Rossen
- Serves: Metropolitan Washington D.C.
- Location: Fairfax County, Virginia
- Elevation AMSL: 250 ft / 76 m
- Coordinates: 38°51′54″N 77°11′48″W

Map
- Location of Falls Church Airpark (Virginia) (the United States)

Runways
Direction	Length		Surface
Direction	ft	m	Surface
9/27	2,650	808	dirt

Falls Church Airpark was an airport located in the Falls Church area of Fairfax County, Virginia, United States, from 1945 to 1961. The facility was located on a parcel of land owned by Eakin Properties, a Virginia real estate development firm. The airport was primarily used for general aviation and civil defense purposes until encroaching residential development forced its closure. The area formerly occupied by the airport is now mainly used as a shopping center with the western end of the complex occupied by the Thomas Jefferson branch of the Fairfax County Public Library system. Parts of several apartment complexes are also located on some of the airport's former grounds.

== History and usage ==
The Falls Church Airpark was a pair of unpaved landing strips located in Fairfax County, Virginia. The license for the airport was granted by the Commonwealth of Virginia on July 25, 1945 but the airport was not available for general use until 1946 when it opened with a single grass runway, 2,650' long. The airport was built on an area known at the time as "Eisenhower's Farm" and was located alongside U.S. Route 50. A 1949 report, compiled by the state of Virginia, described the airport as being located two miles southwest of Falls Church, and featuring a single strip that was characterized as "...poorly graded and hazardous after rains." By 1951, a smaller, crosswind airstrip was added to the complex. During the 1950s, the airport was used by general aviation, civil defense, medical transportation, and air shows. Pilot training was also offered at the facility and airplane sales and rentals were made available through a Mooney aircraft dealer located on the property. The airpark also hosted a chapter of the Civil Air Patrol squadron, private flying clubs, a small building that contained a Link Trainer for student pilot use, a hangar used for maintenance work, and a converted house that was used as both an office and a snack bar complete with vending machines. Despite the difficulties in landing and taking off due to the slope of the main runway and the restricting tree lines at the field's western end, the airfield was popular with local pilots and at its peak hosted approximately 75 planes.

The airport's popularity during the 1950s led to a feature article in the August 7, 1955 edition of the Sunday Washington Post newspaper. The article discussed the activities of the NBC flying club whose founding members worked for the broadcast network's Washington, D.C. affiliate. Totaling 17 members, the club was not restricted to NBC employees and included local area residents. Several of the members interviewed stated that they flew their families to Rehoboth Beach, Florida, and other vacation areas. The article stressed the club members' opinion that the club's flying activities were very affordable compared to commercial air travel or traveling by car. At the time of the article, the club's assets included a four-seat Cessna 170 and a single seat Mooney.

== Significant events ==
- 1947: Two plane crashes in a 24-hour period, one with fatalities. Two people were killed as the result of a mid-air collision between two planes over the airfield. The accident occurred when William Gleason Sauerwein of Falls Church took off from the field in an Aeronca Champion at the same time that F.H. Kirchman, 48, of Vienna, Virginia, was attempting to land while flying a Stinson 105. Both Kirchman and his passenger, Agnes Louise Brady, 47, of Arlington, Virginia, were killed in the accident. Sauerwein was taken to Arlington County hospital with head injuries and a broken leg. Witnesses said that the accident occurred at 7pm when the Stinson cut into the tail of the Aeronca while the planes were approximately 75 feet off the ground. The next day, a second crash occurred when a Funk cabin airplane lost power shortly after takeoff. The pilot, Margaret Vaughn, of Washington, D.C., suffered severe head and leg injuries when the plane crashed into a wooded area about two miles west of the airport, near Gallows Road in Fairfax County. Vaughn was an experienced pilot and was a Link trainer instructor for the Civil Aeronautics Authority. The next day, the Civil Aeronautics Board announced they were conducting a "full inquiry" into the cause of the two crashes. The investigators were specifically concerned with the quality of the gasoline being dispensed at the airport and took samples from Vaughn's aircraft at the scene of the crash.
- 1947: Plane crash with injury. Student pilot Howard Hunt Smith, 26, of Herndon, Virginia was injured when his plane stalled at an altitude of approximately 300 feet, east of the airport. The Aeronca Champion he was flying was destroyed in the crash. Smith suffered lacerations, a broken leg, jaw and arm. He was transported to Arlington Hospital.
- 1951: Model Airplane Meet. The Third Annual Eastern States Model Airplane Meet was held at the facility on August 26, 1951. Several hundred planes took part in the all-day-long event and 50 trophies were awarded for first, second, and third-place finishes in multiple categories. The event was hosted by the Falls Church chapter of the Veterans of Foreign Wars.
- 1951: Plane crash with injuries. Three people were injured when a Stinson Flying Station Wagon developed engine trouble shortly after takeoff and crashed into the tree line just west of the airfield's runway. The injured were Ashby Rosson, 39 of Arlington, Virginia; William C. Snyder, 32, of Fairfax, Virginia; and Arville Judy of Oakton, Virginia. A fourth passenger, Pfc Lewis Robey of Herndon, Virginia was uninjured. Despite their injuries, all four men escaped the plane and managed to clear the area before the Stinson caught fire and burned. In a The Washington Post article describing the incident, Rosson was identified as the owner of the Falls Church Airpark as well as the owner and pilot of the crashed aircraft.

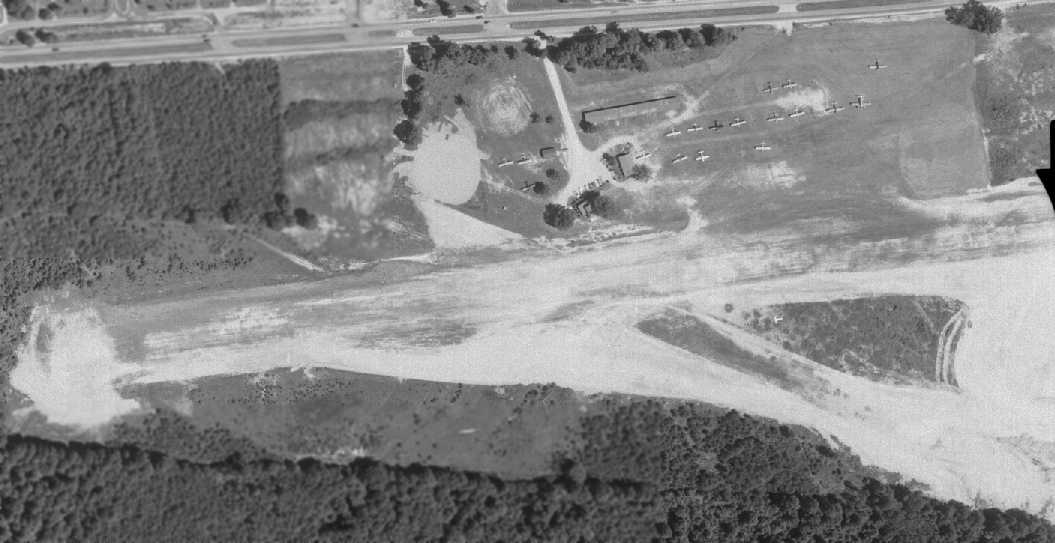
Falls Church Airpark, circa 1950. The road at the top of the photo is U.S Route 50 (Arlington Blvd)

- 1952: Plane crash with injury. A 29-year-old woman from Arlington, Virginia was injured during a ground accident at the airport. The pilot, Ruby Smith, claimed that she accidentally accelerated the plane while she was taxiing, causing the aircraft to nose over on to the ground.
- 1952: Emergency landing of U.S. Air Force plane. A U.S. Air Force C-45 aircraft was forced to land at the airfield after experiencing propeller trouble. The plane was flown by Brigadier General John B. Ackerman and its flight had originated several miles away at Bolling Air Force Base early in the morning of November 16, 1952. A work crew from Bolling repaired the aircraft and flew it back to the base.
- 1952: Civil Defense Exercise. The Fairfax County Civil Air Patrol, in coordination with the Red Cross, local fire departments and hospitals, conducted an exercise that featured an atomic bomb explosion in Falls Church. The weapon's impact was simulated by the Army's Chemical Warfare Service. Following the explosion, response teams met at the airport to provide medical assistance to the wounded and conduct radiological site surveys. Planes took off from the airfield carrying simulated patients and returned to the complex with blood plasma to aid the wounded.
- 1953: Plane crash with fatality. The pilot of an airplane was killed when plane's engine failed and it crashed into a tree in McLean, Virginia. The pilot was identified as Neil Harry Williams, 43, of Springfield, Virginia. Williams had taken off from Falls Church Airpark at 2:20pm, several hours after the plane's engine had been overhauled by maintenance personnel who worked at the airfield. Witnesses reported that plan's engine sputtered and failed over a residential neighborhood. Williams apparently steered the plane away from a house and crashed it into a tree. He was pronounced dead at the scene of the accident.
- 1953: Plane crash with injuries. Two people were injured when the Piper Cub they were flying struck a guy wire attached a high tension power line tower and then crashed to the ground. The injured were identified as Army Soldiers Pfc Remo Scarpulla, 22, of Corona, New York and Corporal Clifton J. Earhard, 21, of Pullman, Washington. Both men were stationed at Walter Reed Army Medical Center. Ashby Rossen, owner of the Falls Church Airpark reported that the two men had taken off from his field at 2pm for aerial photography. After the accident, the injured Soldier's hailed a passing motorist who returned them to the airfield where Rossen summoned an ambulance. Firemen from Falls Church and nearby Annandale, Virginia fought the resulting fire which consumed almost an acre of woods.

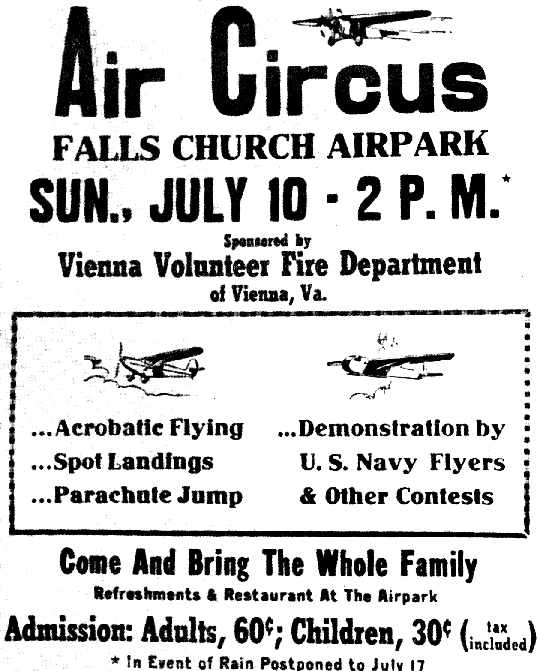
Falls Church Airpark hosted many events including this 1949 air show. Poster courtesy of Abandoned & Little-Known Airfields

- 1954: Plane crash with fatalities. A two-passenger Piper Cub crashed into a residential area in Annandale, Virginia killing the pilot, Maynard Hickman Zink, 22, of Arlington, Virginia and his passenger Robert Lee Blalock, 32, of Falls Church. The pair had taken off from Falls Church Airpark earlier that afternoon. Witnesses said that the plane appeared to have lost part of its wing while flying over the neighborhood and entered into a tailspin. The plane crashed into a yard where children were playing, narrowly missing them. Fairfax County medical personnel pronounced both men dead at the scene of the accident.
- 1960: Fire destroys hangar and planes. Two firemen were injured fighting a fire at the airport on January 7, 1960. The fire consumed a hangar, two planes, tools, and equipment. Fire department personnel said that a faulty electrical circuit sparked and ignited nearby kerosene.
- 1960: Plane crash with injury. H. Shepherd Lippincott, 37, of Arlington, Virginia, crash-landed his Aeronca Champion plane at the intersection of Marc Drive and Norfolk Lane, adjacent to the airport. Lippincott stated that he had been airborne for less than 30 seconds when his plane's engine stopped. As the plane descended, the wing struck a utility line and spun the airplane around before it landed on the street. Neighbors assisted Lippincott in getting out of the plane. He received minor injuries as a result of the accident.

== Closure and aftermath ==
As early as 1956, Eakin Properties, Inc., the owners of the airport's land, had attempted to convert the facility to commercial use. Led by Leroy Eakin, the company had a significant presence in Northern Virginia and had been largely responsible, years earlier, in extending U.S. Route 50 through the parts of Fairfax County where Eakin had purchased over 1,500 acres of real estate for as little as $10 an acre decades earlier. Concerned that a shopping center would lead to traffic problems, the county denied Eakin the permit. After several more years of airport operations, Eakin Properties was named in a July 1960 grand jury indictment charging that the airfield's operation constituted a public nuisance. Neighbors charged that "airplanes taking off and landing raised dust that polluted the air and caused great annoyance inconvenience, and discomfort." Eakin subsequently applied to the county for permission to build apartment complexes on the site of the airfield. On at least two occasions, the applications were denied due to local opposition and concerns regarding the lack of adequate sewage infrastructure needed to support the 832 unit complex proposed by Eakin. Although the airport was still running classified advertisements in the Washington Post as late as August 6, 1960, Eakin eventually succeeded in developing the airport into a shopping center and by 1961 the Falls Church Airpark was no longer shown as an active airfield on the Washington D.C. aeronautical sectional. The shopping center that finally occupied the bulk of the airports former grounds was called "Loehmann's Plaza" and as of 2016 is still in existence, now bearing the name "Graham Park Plaza". in 2022, construction began on a community of 172 townhomes located on a parcel of Graham Park Plaza that previously hosted a number of retail shops. Townhome sales started in 2023, In recognition of the air park, the builder used aviation terms for several of the roads in the complex, the main thoroughfare called "Old Airfield Lane."

== See also ==
- Bailey's Crossroads
