= Birch House (Falls Church, Virginia) =

Historic house in Virginia, United States

- U.S. National Register of Historic Places
- Virginia Landmarks Register
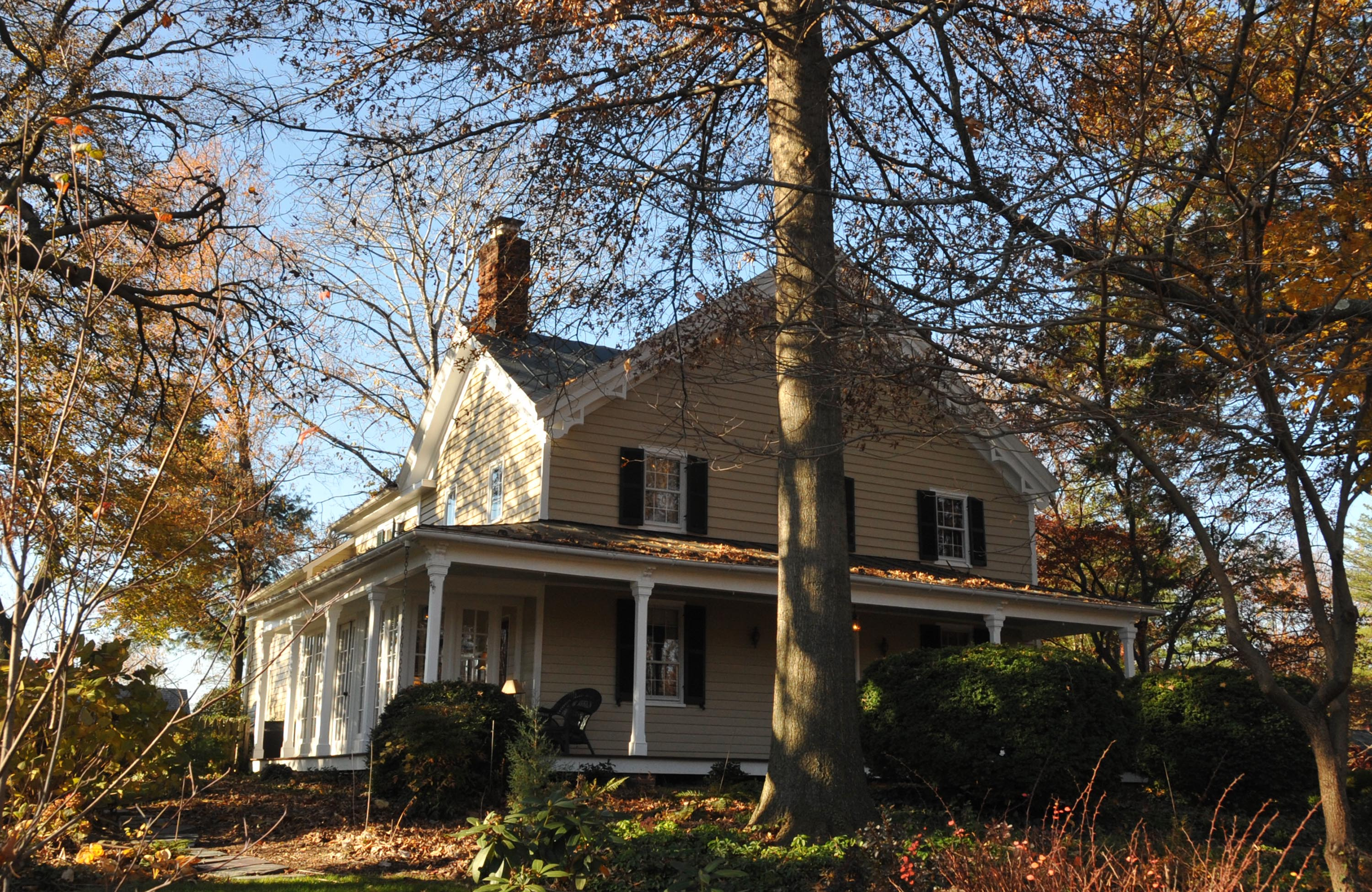
- Birch House, November 2012

- Location within Northern Virginia Location within Virginia Location within the United States
- Location: 312 E. Broad St., Falls Church, Virginia
- Coordinates: 38°52′45″N 77°10′3″W
- Area: 1 acre (0.40 ha)
- Built: c. 1845, 1873
- Architectural style: Greek Revival
- NRHP reference No.: 77001534
- VLR No.: 110-0010

Significant dates
- Added to NRHP: October 26, 1977
- Designated VLR: June 21, 1977

Birch House is a historic home located at Falls Church, Virginia. It was built in the 1840s, as a 1 1/2-story, Greek Revival frame I-house dwelling. It was enlarged to two stories in the 1850s. It was again enlarged in 1873, by an extension across the rear of the original dwelling. A porch across the front was added much later. It was the home of Joseph Edward Birch and his descendants. The house is now owned by former City of Falls Church Vice Mayor and Mrs. Samuel A. Mabry. The Mabrys purchased the house in 1984. The garden has been featured in the Virginia State Garden show twice.

It was listed on the National Register of Historic Places in 1977.
