= Mount Hope (Falls Church, Virginia) =

Historic house in Virginia, United States

- U.S. National Register of Historic Places
- Virginia Landmarks Register
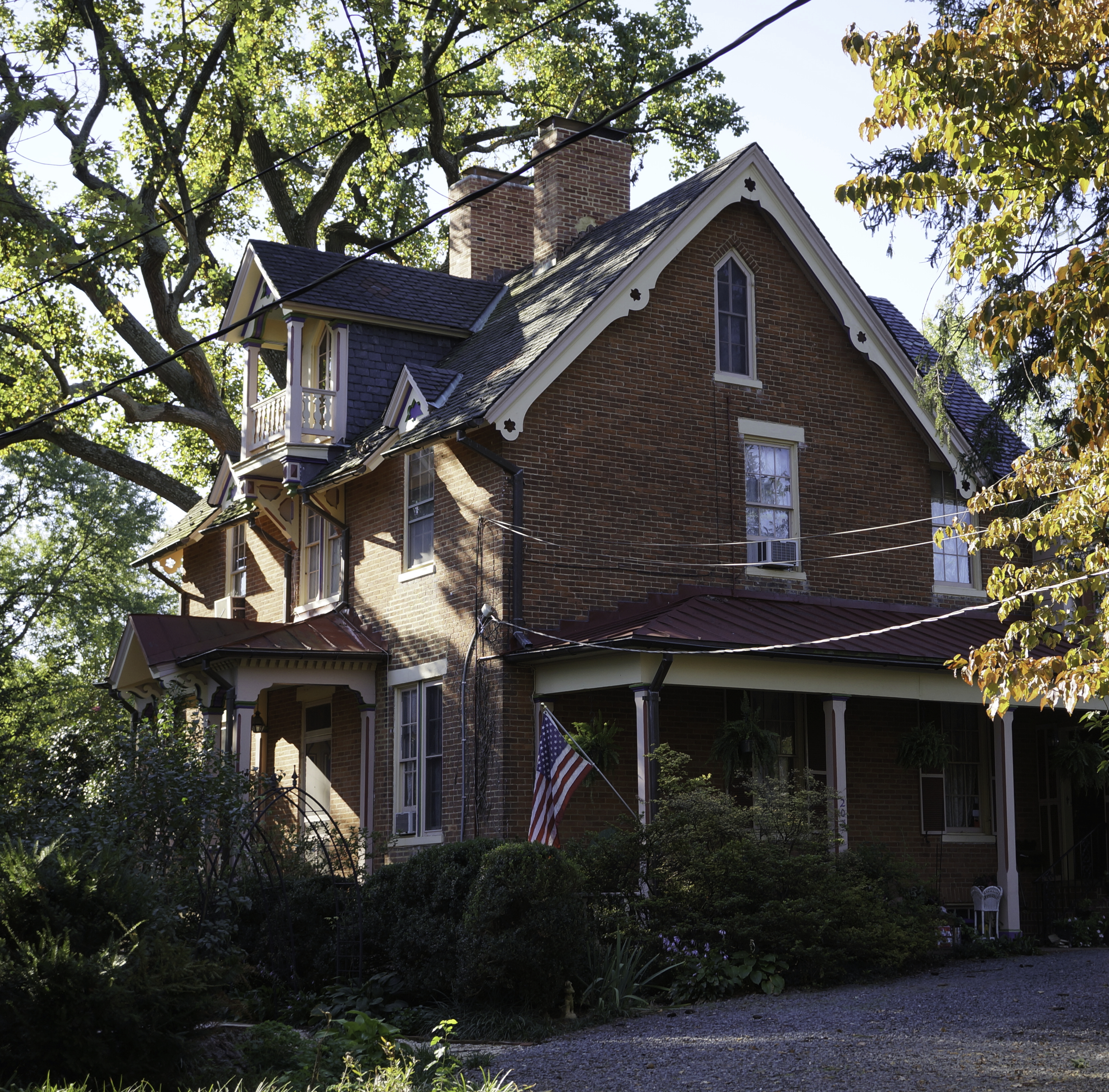
- Mount Hope, September 2012

- Location within Northern Virginia Location within Virginia Location within the United States
- Location: 203 Oak St., Falls Church, Virginia
- Coordinates: 38°53′9″N 77°10′54″W
- Area: 0.5 acres (0.20 ha)
- Built: c. 1830, 1869
- Built by: Lounsberry, A.E.
- Architectural style: Greek Revival, Late Victorian
- NRHP reference No.: 84000037
- VLR No.: 110-0015

Significant dates
- Added to NRHP: October 4, 1984
- Designated VLR: August 21, 1984

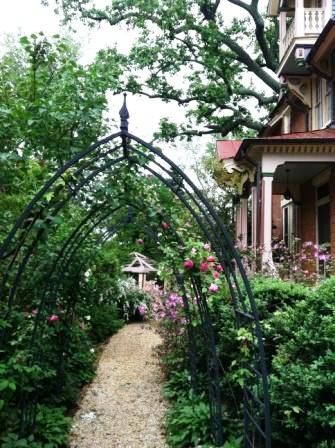

Mount Hope is a historic home located at Falls Church, Virginia. It was built in the 1830s, as a 1 1/2-story, frame I-house dwelling. It consists of three parts: a frame dwelling built about 1830; a 2 1/2-story, 3-bay, Gothic Revival brick dwelling built in 1869; and a 1-bay brick section that joins the two. The 1869 section features a pair of corbel topped chimneys that pierce the apex of the gable roof, which has a substantial overhang on all elevations. It also has a three-bay porch with low hipped roof across the front facade.

The 1831 wing of the house is the oldest residential building in Falls Church. It was one of the earliest stops on the local mail route.

Amzi Coe purchased the residence in 1842 and named it Mount Hope. The property was used for meetings of the Presbyterian Church in the parlor.

It was listed on the National Register of Historic Places in 1977.
