= Cherry Hill Farmhouse =

Historic house in Virginia, United States

- U.S. National Register of Historic Places
- Virginia Landmarks Register
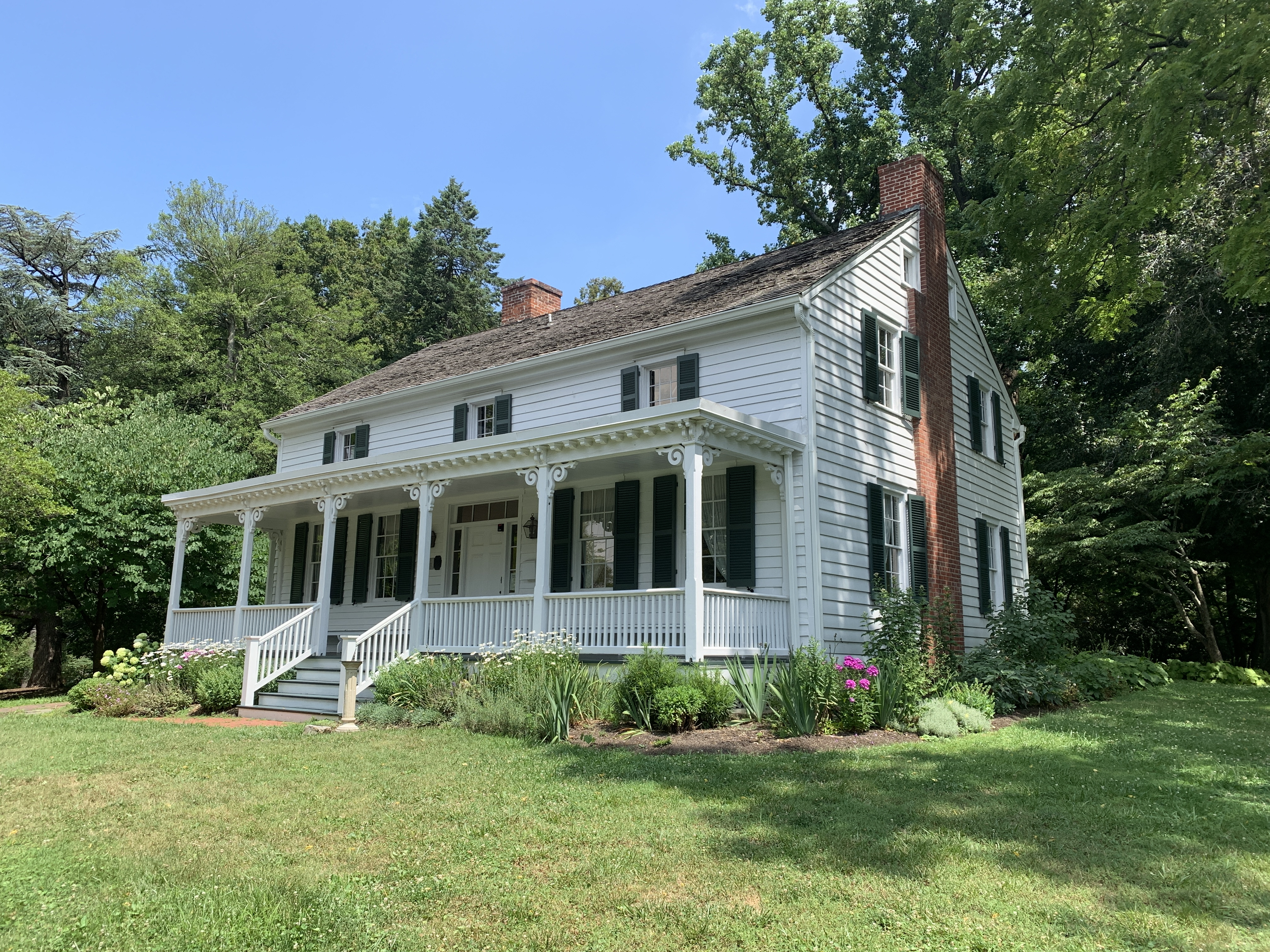
- Cherry Hill Farmhouse

- Location within Northern Virginia Location within Virginia Location within the United States
- Location: 312 Park Avenue, Falls Church, Virginia
- Coordinates: 38°53′12″N 77°10′22″W
- Area: 7 acres
- Built: 1845
- Architectural style: Greek Revival
- NRHP reference No.: 73002210
- VLR No.: 110-0004

Significant dates
- Added to NRHP: July 26, 1973
- Designated VLR: June 19, 1973

The Cherry Hill Farmhouse is a house museum in Falls Church, Virginia, United States. Built in 1845 in a Greek Revival architecture style, it belonged to wealthy farmer families until 1945, and in 1956 it became property of the City of Falls Church, which transformed it into a museum, as a historical building. Today, the Cherry Hill Farmhouse, along with other five such constructions in Falls Church City, is part of the National Register of Historic Places, as an important testimony of 19th century Victorian buildings in the area.

== History ==
The house hosting the museum was built about 1845 as a farmstead in a Greek Revival architecture and frame barn. Mr. William A. Blaisdell, who managed a stall in the nearby District of Columbia, purchased the house in 1856 as part of a 73-acre farm. It has long been named Cherry Hill because of the fruit orchards that surrounded the house.

From 1870 to 1945 the house belonged to the Riley family who were prominent in the village; it was Joseph Riley that in 1875 lead the effort to petition the state for Falls Church to become a town. At that time the town included parts of Fairfax and Alexandria Counties (now called Arlington County). The poet James Whitcomb Riley, a relative of the owners and visitor to the farmhouse, included references to the farmhouse and some of its residents in some of his poems. The farmhouse, barn, and outbuildings were bequeathed to the University of Virginia in 1945, and the school owned it until 1956 when the City of Falls Church purchased them along with the rest of the property bounded by Park Avenue, Little Falls Street, and Great Falls Street. Then, in the 1960s, a number of local history lovers created the Friends of Cherry Hill to restore the house to the period of its construction and make a house museum to exhibit the lifestyle of the prosperous families of the area. It provides a glimpse of the antebellum times in Falls Church and later in the Victorian period. The docents provide the history of the house, the local area at the time, and the connection to the national affairs. Nowadays the house is included within a 7-acre park.

The museum includes the household's authentic 18th and 19th century furniture, which along with other historical pieces, are owned and maintained by a foundation called Friends of Cherry Hill, whereas the barn houses a 19th-century collection of tools.

The Cherry Hill Farmhouse & Barn is part of the National Register of Historic Places and is one of only six Falls Church houses of the Victorian era on that list (no commercial buildings from that period have survived).
