= Falls Church, Virginia =

Independent city in Virginia, United States

- Independent city
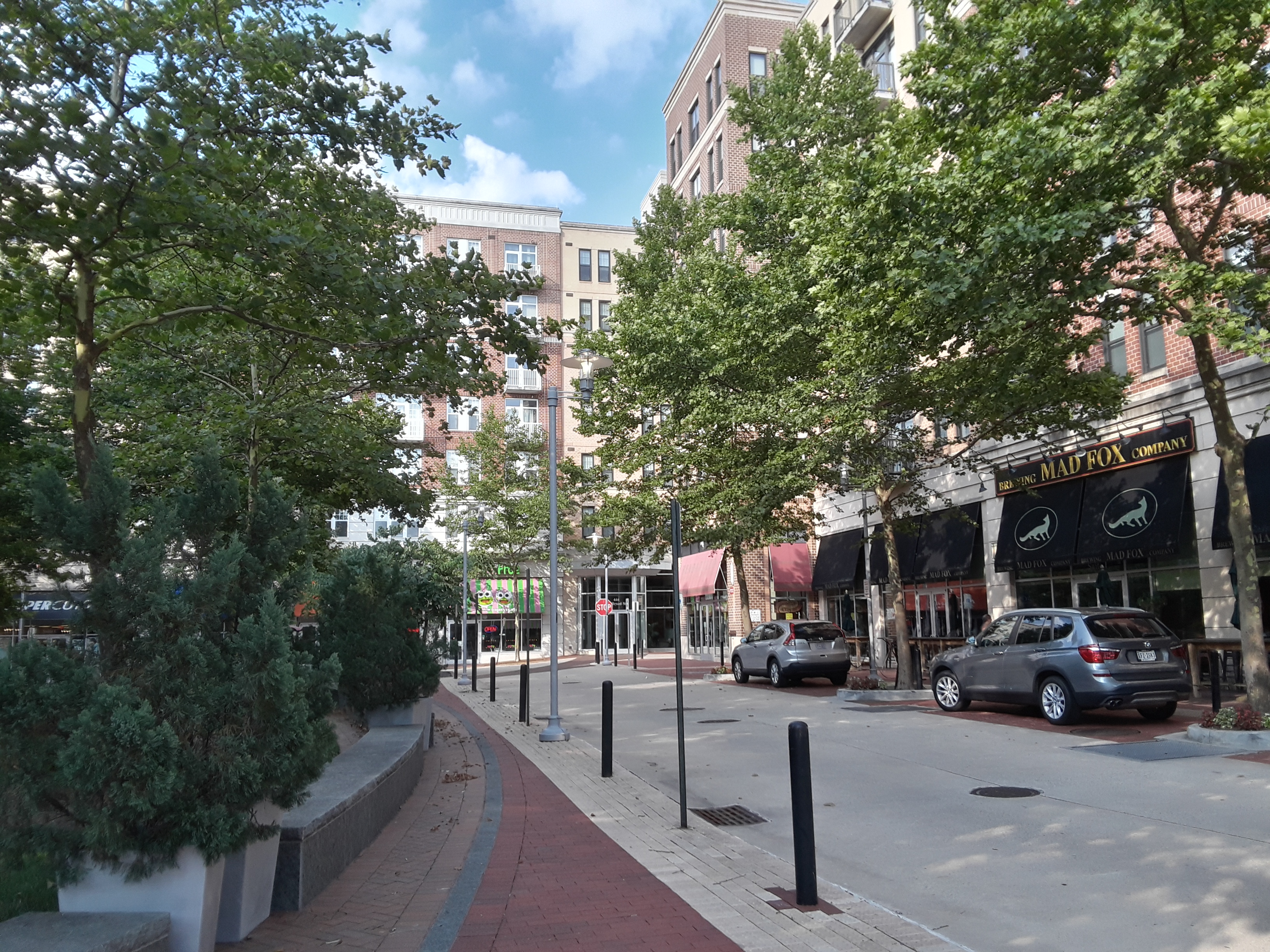
- Downtown Falls Church

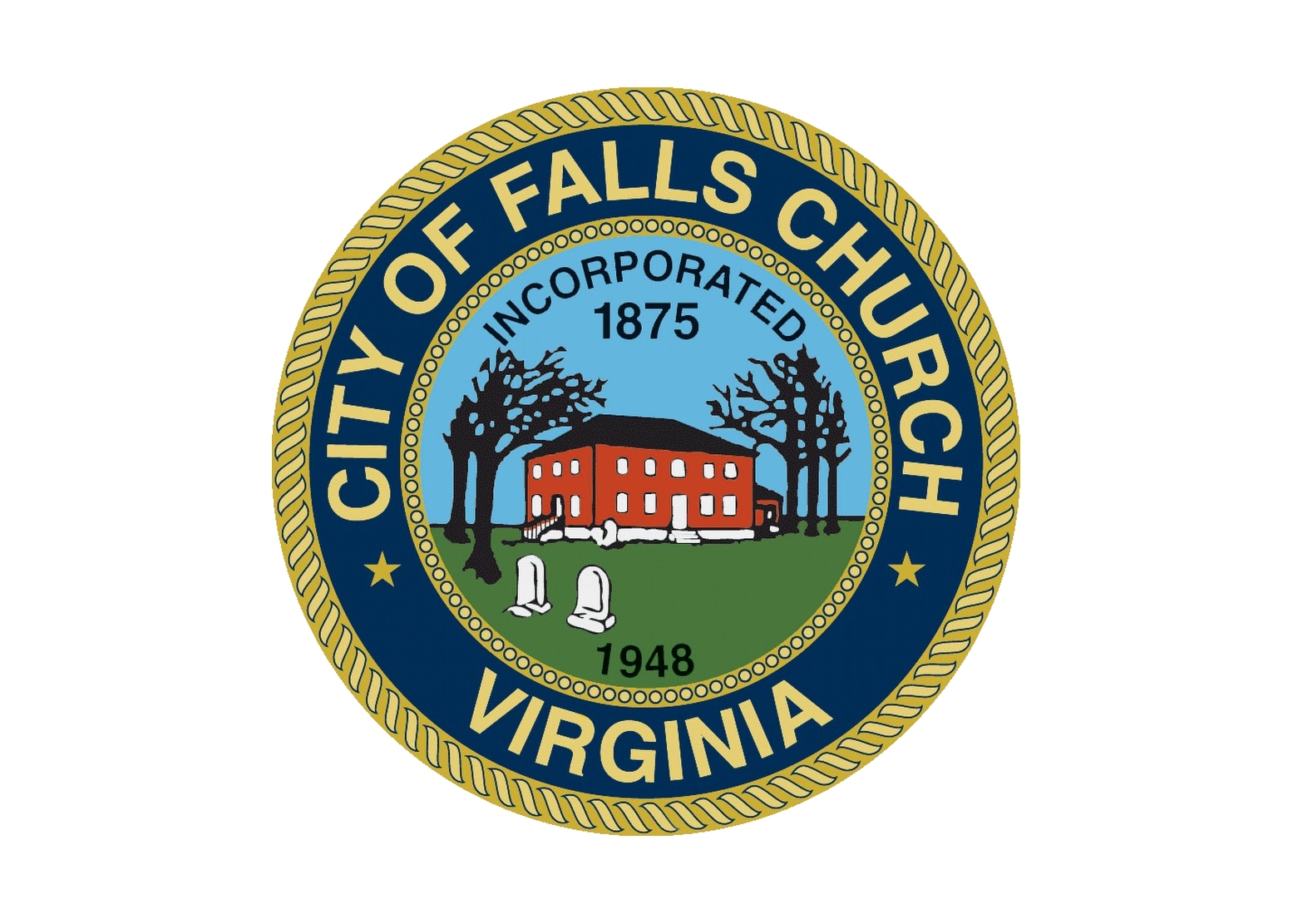
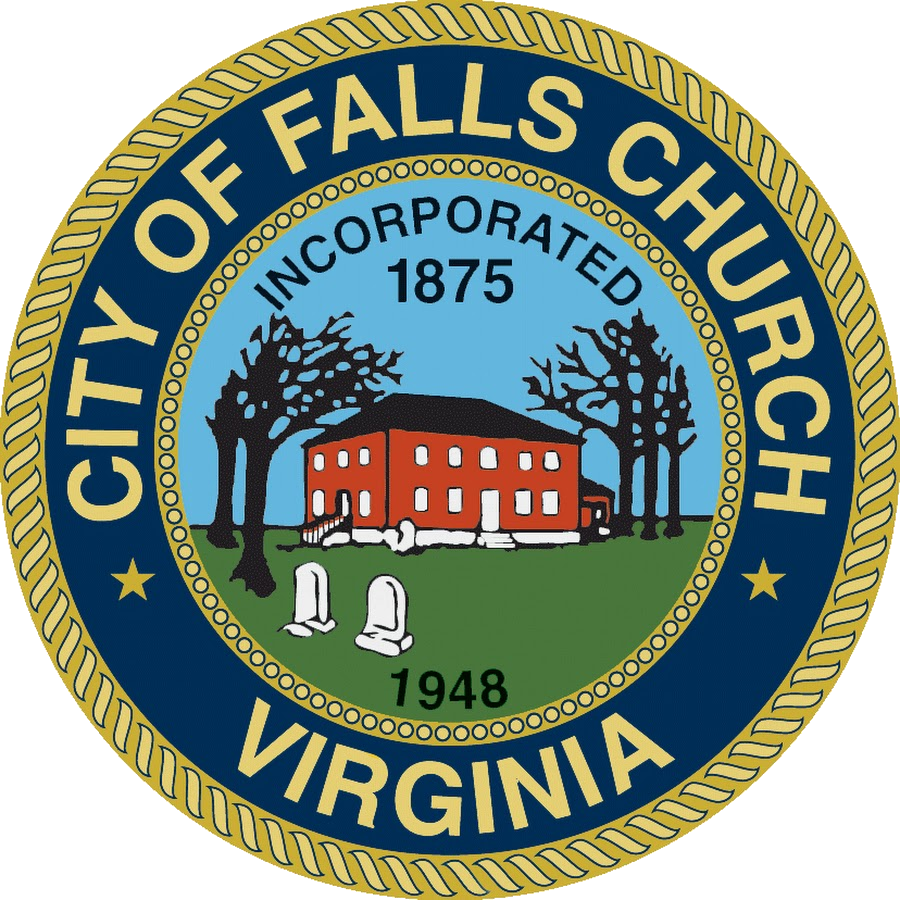
- Flag Seal

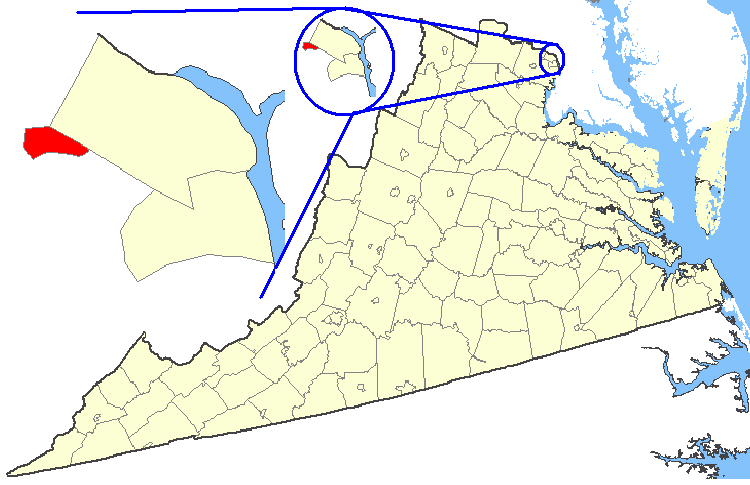
- Location of Falls Church in Virginia

- Falls Church highlighted red in the Commonwealth of Virginia

- Location within Northern Virginia Location within Virginia Location within the United States
- Coordinates: 38°53′09″N 77°10′20″W
- Country: United States
- State: Virginia
- Settled: c. 1699
- Incorporated (town): 1875
- Incorporated (city): 1948

Government
  - Type: Council–manager
  - Mayor: Letty Hardi (D)

Area
  - Total: 2.05 sq mi (5.30 km^{2})
  - Land: 2.05 sq mi (5.30 km^{2})
  - Water: 0 sq mi (0.00 km^{2})
- Elevation: 325 ft (99 m)

Population (2020)
  - Total: 14,658
  - Estimate (2025): 15,159 ▲
  - Density: 7,160/sq mi (2,770/km^{2})
- Time zone: UTC−5 (EST)
  - Summer (DST): UTC−4 (EDT)
- ZIP Codes: 22040, 22042, 22044, 22046
- Area codes: 703 and 571
- FIPS code: 51-27200
- GNIS feature ID: 1495526
- Website: fallschurchva.gov
- Sister city is Kokolopori, Democratic Republic of Congo

Falls Church is an independent city in the Commonwealth of Virginia, United States. As of the 2020 census, the population was 14,658. Falls Church is part of both Northern Virginia and the Washington metropolitan area. As of 2020, it has a median household income of $146,922, the second-highest household income of any county in the nation behind Loudoun County, Virginia.

Taking its name from the Falls Church, an 18th-century parish of the Church of England, later the Episcopal Church, Falls Church gained township status within Fairfax County in 1875.

In 1948, it seceded from Fairfax County and was incorporated as the City of Falls Church, an independent city with county-level governance status although it is not nominally a county.

The city's corporate boundaries do not include all of the area historically known as Falls Church; these areas include portions of Seven Corners and other portions of the current Falls Church postal districts in Fairfax County and Arlington County, known as East Falls Church, which was part of the town of Falls Church from 1875 to 1936. For statistical purposes, the U.S. Department of Commerce's Bureau of Economic Analysis combines the City of Falls Church with Fairfax City and Fairfax County.

At 2.11 square miles (5.5 km^{2}), Falls Church is the smallest incorporated municipality in the Commonwealth of Virginia and the smallest county-equivalent municipality in the United States.

== Etymology ==
The independent city of Falls Church is named for the Falls Church, a parish founded in 1734 under the Church of England (later Episcopal Church). The Falls Church was founded at the intersection of important Native American trails that were later paved and named Broad Street, Lee Highway and Little Falls Street. The church's name was derived from its proximity to the Little Falls of the Potomac River, a set of rapids located several miles to the northeast. These "falls" were a well-known landmark to early colonists and surveyors in the 18th century, and the church became associated with them despite being some distance inland.

Over time, the community surrounding the church near the falls came to be identified simply as "Falls Church", and the name persisted as civic and administrative structures developed. When the area was incorporated as an independent city in 1948, the name was officially retained, reflecting both the continuity of local identity and the long-standing influence of the church.

== History ==
The first known government in the area was the Iroquois Confederacy. After exploration by Captain John Smith, England began sending colonists to what they called Virginia. While no records have yet been found showing the earliest colony settlement in the area, a cottage demolished between 1908 and 1914, two blocks from the city center, bore a stone engraved with the date "1699" set into one of its two large chimneys.

During the American Revolution, the area is most known for the Falls Church vestrymen George Washington and George Mason. A copy of the United States Declaration of Independence was read to citizens from the steps of the Falls Church during the summer of 1776.

During the American Civil War, Falls Church voted 44–26 in favor of secession. The Confederate army occupied the then village of Falls Church as well as Munson's and Upton's hills to the East, probably due to their views of Washington. On September 28, 1861, Confederate troops withdrew from Falls Church and nearby hills, retreating to the heights at Centreville. Union troops took Munson's and Upton's hills, yet the village was never entirely brought under Union rule. Mosby's Raiders made several armed incursions into the heart of Falls Church to kidnap and murder suspected Northern sympathizers in 1864 and 1865.

=== Historic sites ===
Cherry Hill Farmhouse and Barn, an 1845 Greek-Revival farmhouse and 1856 barn, owned and managed by the city of Falls Church, are open to the public on select Saturdays in summer. Tinner Hill Arch and Tinner Hill Heritage Foundation represent a locus of early African American history in the area, including the site of the first rural chapter of the NAACP.

Two of the District of Columbia's original 1791 boundary stones are located in public parks on the boundary between Falls Church and Arlington County. The west cornerstone stands in Andrew Ellicott Park at 2824 Meridian Street, Falls Church and N. Arizona Street, Arlington, just south of West Street. Stone number SW9 stands in Benjamin Banneker Park on Van Buren Street, south of 18th Street, near the East Falls Church Metro station. Most of Banneker Park is in Arlington County, across Van Buren Street from Isaac Crossman Park at Four Mile Run.

==== Sites on the National Register of Historic Places ====
Site	Year built	Address	Listed
Birch House (Joseph Edward Birch House)	1840	312 East Broad Street	1977
Cherry Hill (John Mills Farm)	1845	312 Park Avenue	1973
The Falls Church	1769	115 East Fairfax Street	1970
Federal District Boundary Marker, SW 9 Stone	1791	18th and Van Buren Streets	1976
Federal District Boundary Marker, West Cornerstone	1791	2824 Meridian Street	1991
Mount Hope	1790s	203 South Oak Street	1984

== Geography ==
According to the U.S. Census Bureau, the city has a total area of 2.0 square miles (5.2 km^{2}), all land. Falls Church is the smallest independent city by area in Virginia. Since independent cities in Virginia are considered county-equivalents, it is also the smallest county-equivalent in the United States by area.

The center of the city is the crossroads of Virginia State Route 7 (Broad St./Leesburg Pike) and U.S. Route 29 (Washington St./Lee Highway).

Tripps Run, a tributary of the Cameron Run Watershed, drains two-thirds of Falls Church, while the Four Mile Run watershed drains the other third of the city. Four Mile Run flows at the base of Minor's Hill, which overlooks Falls Church on its north, and Upton's Hill, which borders the area to its east.

=== Adjacent jurisdictions ===
- Arlington County - east
- Fairfax County - north, west, south

== Demographics ==
Historical population
Census	Pop.	Note	%±
1880	660		—
1890	792		20.0%
1900	1,007		27.1%
1910	1,128		12.0%
1920	1,659		47.1%
1930	2,019		21.7%
1940	2,576		27.6%
1950	7,535		192.5%
1960	10,192		35.3%
1970	10,772		5.7%
1980	9,515		−11.7%
1990	9,578		0.7%
2000	10,377		8.3%
2010	12,332		18.8%
2020	14,658		18.9%
2025 (est.)	15,159	▲	3.4%
U.S. Decennial Census; 1790–1960 1900–1990; 1990–2000 2010 2020

=== Racial and ethnic composition ===
Falls Church city, Virginia – Racial and ethnic composition Note: the US Census treats Hispanic/Latino as an ethnic category. This table excludes Latinos from the racial categories and assigns them to a separate category. Hispanics/Latinos may be of any race.
Race / Ethnicity (NH = Non-Hispanic)	Pop 1980	Pop 1990	Pop 2000	Pop 2010	Pop 2020	% 1980	% 1990	% 2000	% 2010	% 2020
White alone (NH)	8,577	8,189	8,255	9,093	9,955	90.14%	85.50%	79.55%	73.73%	67.92%
Black or African American alone (NH)	220	284	321	523	554	2.31%	2.97%	3.09%	4.24%	3.78%
Native American or Alaska Native alone (NH)	10	39	21	23	12	0.11%	0.41%	0.20%	0.19%	0.08%
Asian alone (NH)	282	449	674	1,150	1,494	2.96%	4.69%	6.50%	9.33%	10.19%
Native Hawaiian or Pacific Islander alone (NH)	x	x	7	4	10	x	x	0.07%	0.03%	0.07%
Other race alone (NH)	111	13	16	20	117	1.17%	0.14%	0.15%	0.16%	0.80%
Mixed race or Multiracial (NH)	x	x	207	410	987	x	x	1.99%	3.32%	6.73%
Hispanic or Latino (any race)	315	604	876	1,109	1,529	3.31%	6.31%	8.44%	8.99%	10.43%
Total	9,515	9,578	10,377	12,332	14,658	100.00%	100.00%	100.00%	100.00%	100.00%

=== 2020 census ===
As of the 2020 census, Falls Church had a population of 14,658. The median age was 39.1 years. 24.6% of residents were under the age of 18 and 14.9% of residents were 65 years of age or older. For every 100 females there were 93.9 males, and for every 100 females age 18 and over there were 89.7 males age 18 and over.

100.0% of residents lived in urban areas, while 0.0% lived in rural areas.

There were 5,811 households in Falls Church, of which 36.1% had children under the age of 18 living in them. Of all households, 51.5% were married-couple households, 17.8% were households with a male householder and no spouse or partner present, and 25.7% were households with a female householder and no spouse or partner present. About 29.8% of all households were made up of individuals and 10.0% had someone living alone who was 65 years of age or older.

There were 6,172 housing units, of which 5.8% were vacant. The homeowner vacancy rate was 0.5% and the rental vacancy rate was 6.4%.

Racial composition as of the 2020 census
Race	Number	Percent
White	10,221	69.7%
Black or African American	576	3.9%
American Indian and Alaska Native	32	0.2%
Asian	1,499	10.2%
Native Hawaiian and Other Pacific Islander	11	0.1%
Some other race	582	4.0%
Two or more races	1,737	11.9%
Hispanic or Latino (of any race)	1,529	10.4%

== Economy ==
In 2011, Falls Church was named the richest county (or county equivalent) in the United States, with a median annual household income of $113,313. While Fortune 500 companies General Dynamics and Northrop Grumman have headquarters with mailing addresses in Falls Church, they are physically in Fairfax County.

=== Top employers ===
According to the city's 2024 Annual Comprehensive Financial Report, the top employers in the city are:

Employer	Employees
Falls Church City Public Schools	500-700
Falls Church City Government	300-500
Kaiser Permanente	200-300
Markon Solutions	200-300
Koons Ford	100-200
Tax Analysts	100-200
Giant Food	100-200
Harris Teeter	100-200
Don Beyer Volvo	100-200
BJ's Wholesale Club	100-200

The city has broken ground on several redevelopment projects to be completed in the next few years, including the West Falls Church Economic Development Project and Founders Row along Route 7/Broad street.

== Arts and culture ==
=== Annual events ===
The city holds an annual Memorial Day Parade with bands, military units, civic associations, and fire/rescue stations, in recent years the event has featured a street festival with food, crafts, and non-profit organization booths, and a 3K fun run (the 2009 race drew some 3,000 runners). the Falls Church Farmer's Market is held Saturdays year-round, Jan 3 – April 25 (9 am – Noon), May 2 – Dec 26 (8 am – Noon), at the City Hall Parking Lot, 300 Park Ave. In addition to regional attention, in 2010 the market was ranked first in the medium category of the American Farmland Trust's contest to identify America's Favorite Farmers' Markets.

=== Cultural institutions ===
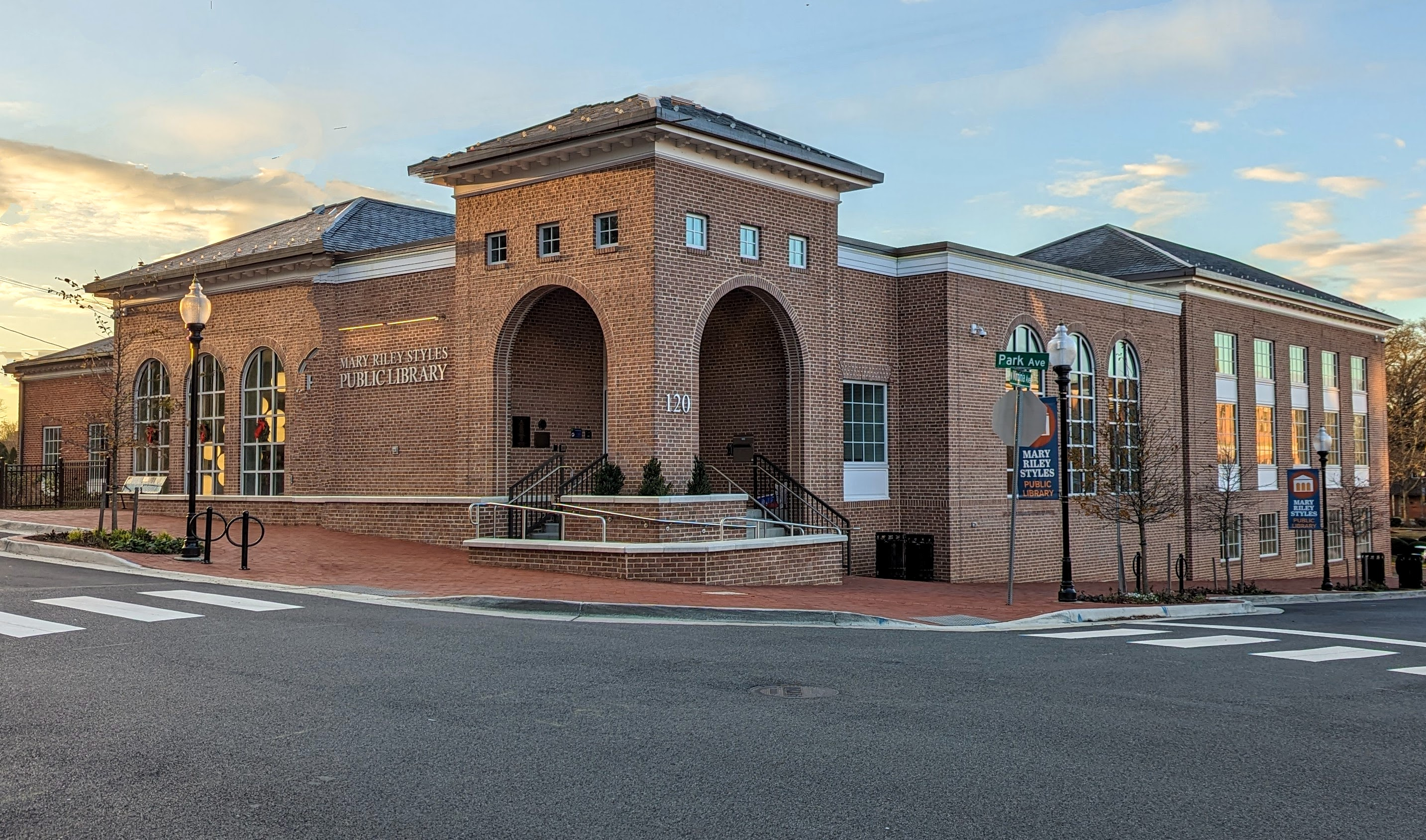
Mary Riley Styles Public Library

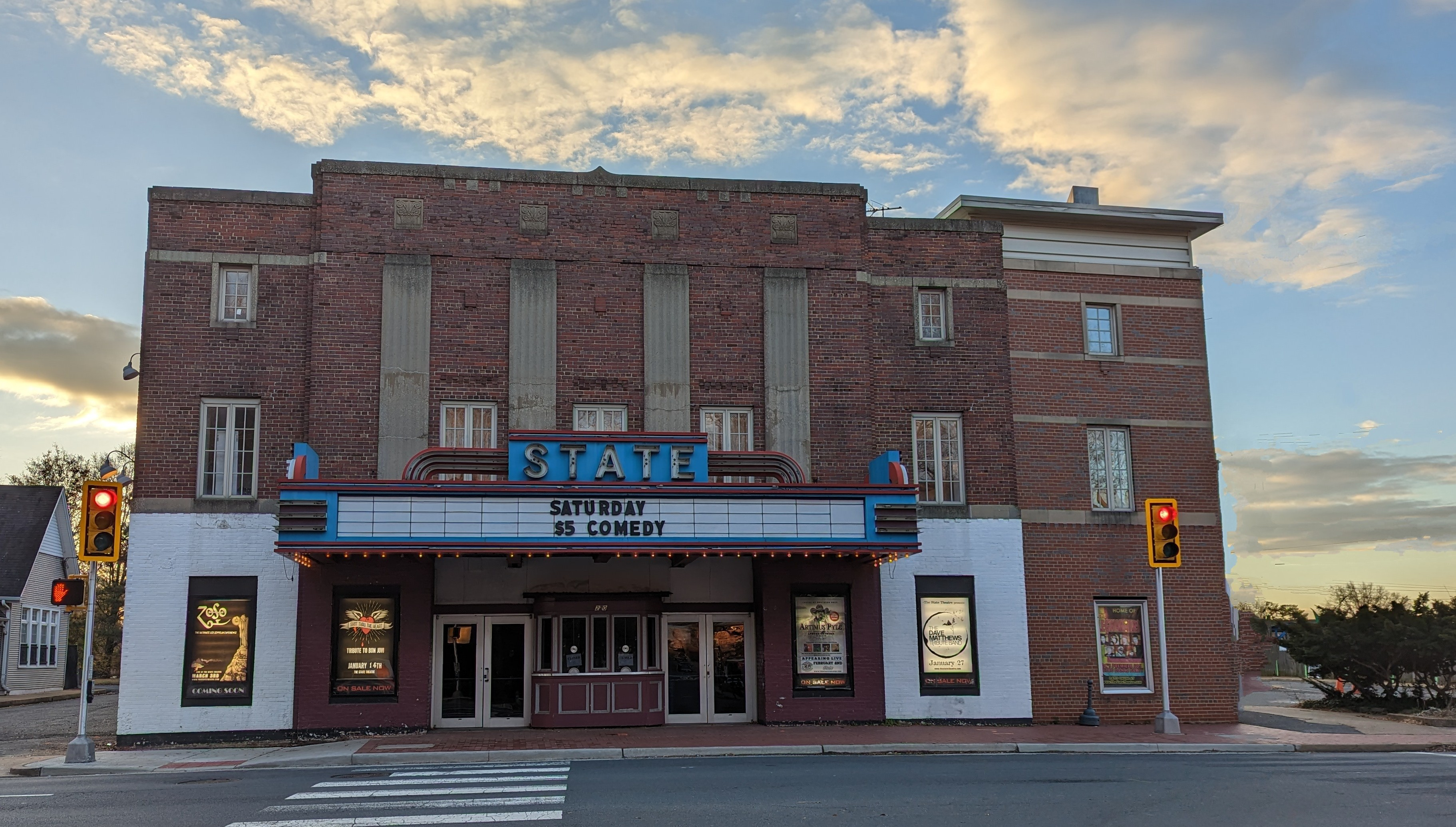
The State Theatre

The Falls Church Village Preservation and Improvement Society was founded in 1885 by Arthur Douglas and re-established in 1965 to promote the history, culture, and beautification of the city. The Tinner Hill Heritage Foundation was founded in 1997 by Edwin B. Henderson II to preserve the Civil Rights and African American history and culture. Falls Church is where the first rural branch of the NAACP was established stemming from events that took place in 1915, when the town passed a segregation ordinance by creating segregated districts in the town. The ordinance was not enforced after the U. S. Supreme Court ruling in Buchanan v. Warley in 1917. The Mary Riley Styles Public Library is Falls Church's public library; established in 1899, its current building was constructed for the purpose in 1958 and expanded in 1993 and 2021. In addition to its circulating collections, it houses a local history collection, including newspaper files, local government documents, and photographs. The State Theatre stages a wide variety of live performances. Built as a movie house in 1936, it was reputed to be the first air-conditioned theater on the east coast. It closed in 1983; after extensive renovations in the 1990s, including a stage, bar, and restaurant, it re-opened as a music venue.

== Government ==
Like most cities near the District of Columbia, Falls Church is a Democratic powerhouse, most notably in recent elections. It has not supported a Republican presidential candidate since 1984. With the exception of 2012 and 2024, the Democratic share of the vote in the city has increased in every election since 1988, peaking in 2020 when Joe Biden broke 80% of the vote, the best Democratic performance since the city's incorporation.

United States presidential election results for Falls Church, Virginia
Year	Republican		Democratic		Third party(ies)	
Year	No.	%	No.	%	No.	%
1952	1,386	59.82%	930	40.14%	1	0.04%
1956	1,462	53.13%	1,233	44.80%	57	2.07%
1960	1,525	48.18%	1,629	51.47%	11	0.35%
1964	1,329	35.85%	2,371	63.96%	7	0.19%
1968	2,005	45.76%	1,860	42.45%	517	11.80%
1972	2,967	60.02%	1,895	38.34%	81	1.64%
1976	2,323	50.63%	2,202	47.99%	63	1.37%
1980	2,485	52.23%	1,703	35.79%	570	11.98%
1984	2,684	52.62%	2,398	47.01%	19	0.37%
1988	2,470	49.51%	2,484	49.79%	35	0.70%
1992	1,912	35.38%	2,864	53.00%	628	11.62%
1996	1,644	38.38%	2,375	55.44%	265	6.19%
2000	2,131	38.10%	3,109	55.59%	353	6.31%
2004	2,074	34.01%	3,944	64.68%	80	1.31%
2008	1,970	29.19%	4,695	69.56%	85	1.26%
2012	2,147	29.51%	5,015	68.93%	114	1.57%
2016	1,324	17.07%	5,819	75.02%	614	7.92%
2020	1,490	16.90%	7,146	81.03%	183	2.08%
2024	1,620	17.88%	7,200	79.45%	242	2.67%

Falls Church is governed by a seven-member city council, each elected at large for four-year, staggered terms. Council members are typically career professionals holding down full-time jobs. In addition to attending a minimum of 22 council meetings and 22 work sessions each year, they also attend meetings of local boards and commissions and regional organizations (several Council Members serve on committees of regional organizations as well). Members also participate in the Virginia Municipal League and some serve on statewide committees. The mayor and vice-mayor are elected by members of the council. In January 2026, mayor Letty Hardi was elected for her second term as mayor 4-3, while vice-mayor Laura Downs was elected unanimously for her first term. The city operates in a typical council–manager form of municipal government, with a city manager hired by the council to serve as the city's chief administrative officer. The city's elected Sheriff is Metin "Matt" Cay. Candidates for city elections typically do not run under a nationally affiliated party nomination.

City services and functions include education, parks and recreation, library, police, land use, zoning, building inspections, street maintenance, and storm water and sanitary sewer service. Often named a Tree City USA, the city has one full-time arborist. Some public services are provided by agreement with the city's county neighbors of Arlington and Fairfax, including certain health and human services (Fairfax); and court services, transport, and fire/rescue services (Arlington). The city provided water utility service to a large portion of eastern Fairfax County, including the dense commercial areas of Tysons Corner and Merrifield, until January 2014, when the water utility was sold to the Fairfax County Water Authority.

== Education ==
The city is served by Falls Church City Public Schools:

- Jessie Thackrey Preschool
- Mount Daniel Elementary School, which includes kindergarten through second grade.
- Oak Street Elementary, which includes grades 3–5.
- Mary Ellen Henderson Middle School, which includes grades 6–8.
- Meridian High School, which includes grades 9–12.

Of the four Falls Church City Public Schools, one (Mount Daniel Elementary School) is located outside city limits in neighboring Fairfax County. Falls Church High School is not part of the Falls Church City Public School system, but rather the Fairfax County Public Schools; it does not serve the city of Falls Church.

Falls Church City is eligible to send up to three students per year to the Fairfax County magnet school, Thomas Jefferson High School for Science and Technology.

The city is home to Saint James Catholic School, a parochial school serving grades K–8, and Grace Christian Academy, a Pre-K to 8th grade Christian parochial school of the Wisconsin Evangelical Lutheran Synod.

== Media ==
The Falls Church News-Press is a free weekly newspaper founded in 1991 that focuses on local news and commentary and includes nationally syndicated columns. The area is also served by national and regional newspapers, including The Washington Times and The Washington Post. The city is also served by numerous citizen- and corporate-sponsored Internet blogs. WAMU Radio 88.5 produces news and opinion programs with a local focus.

== Infrastructure ==
=== Transportation ===
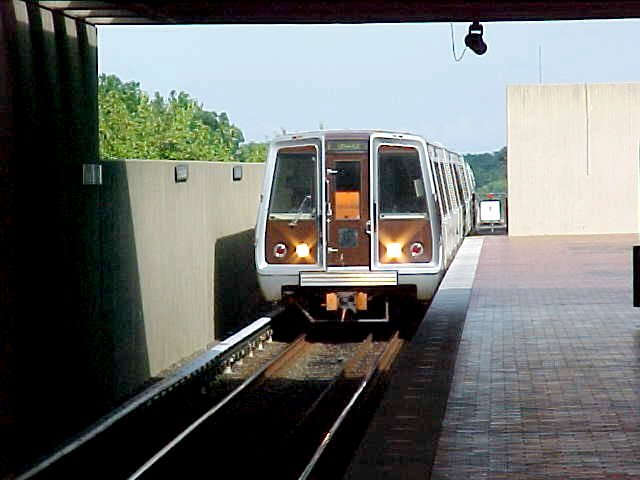
A Washington Metro train entering East Falls Church station

Although two stations on the Washington Metro's Orange Line have "Falls Church" in their names, neither lies within the City of Falls Church: East Falls Church station is in Arlington County and West Falls Church station is in Fairfax County.

- Metro's Silver Line, completed July 2014, serves the East Falls Church station. It runs between Downtown Largo in the east, following the Blue Line route to Stadium-Armory, the Orange and Blue Lines to Rosslyn, and finally the Orange route alone until it reaches East Falls Church, where it branches off towards the northwest, terminating in Ashburn, servicing Dulles International Airport. East Falls Church is the westernmost designated transfer station.
- The Washington Metropolitan Area Transit Authority provides bus service throughout the Washington metropolitan area, including Falls Church.
- A small portion of the 45-mile (72 km) Washington and Old Dominion Railroad Trail (W&OD Trail) runs through the city (see: Washington & Old Dominion Railroad Regional Park). The trail enters the city from the west between mile markers 7 and 7.5 (near Broad Street). The trail enters the city from the east between mile markers 5.5 and 6. The W&OD Trail travels on the rail bed of the Washington and Old Dominion Railroad and various predecessor lines, which provided passenger service from 1860 to May 31, 1951, with exception of a few years during the U.S. Civil War. Freight service was abandoned when the railroad closed in August 1968. The Four Mile Run Trail, which ends at an intersection with the Mount Vernon Trail near Ronald Reagan Washington National Airport, begins in the city at Van Buren Street. These trails comprise a major bicycle commuting route to Washington, D.C.

==== Major highways ====
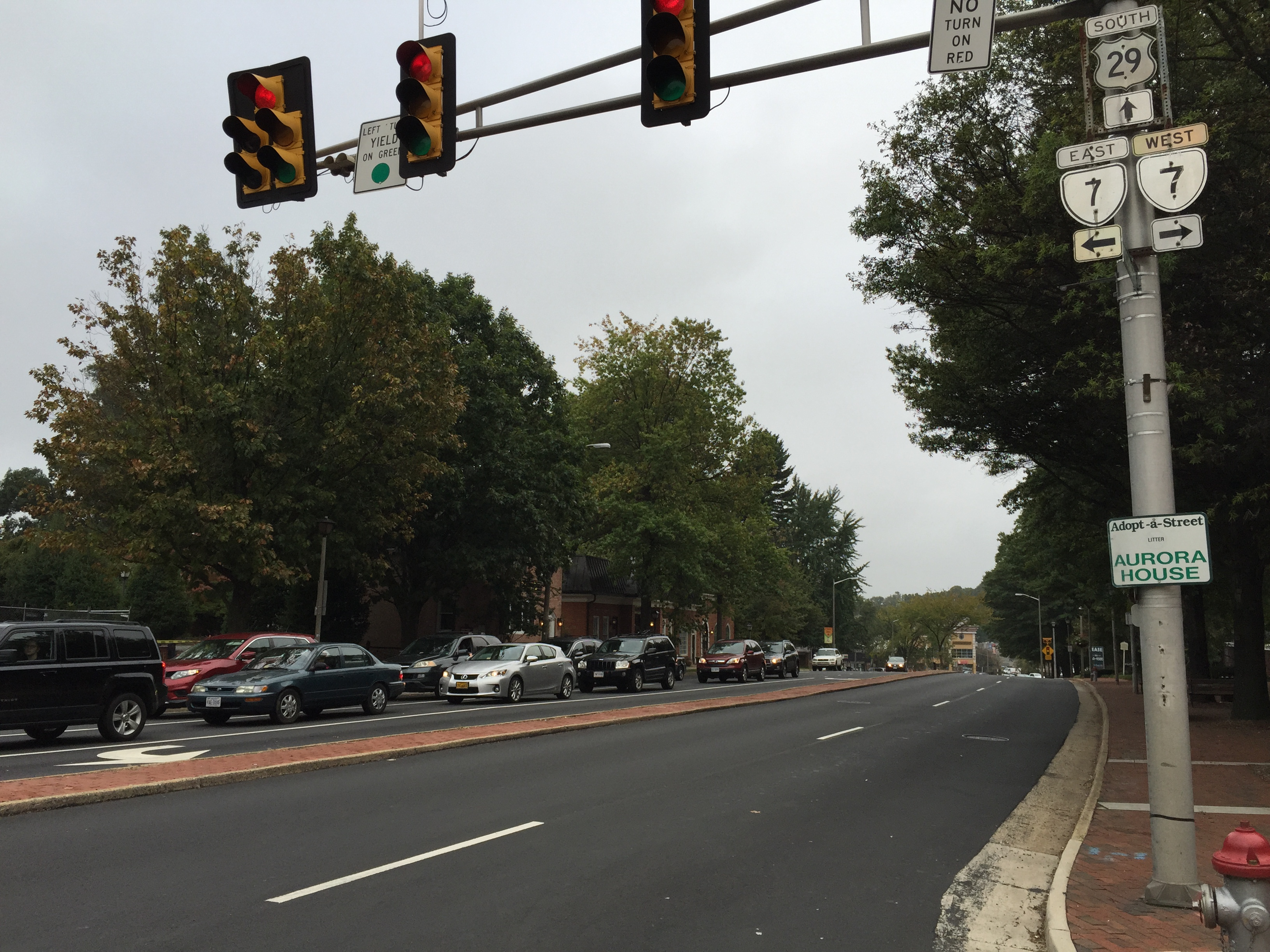
The junction of US 29 and SR 7 in Falls Church

The primary roads serving Falls Church directly are U.S. Route 29 and Virginia State Route 7. The portion of US 29 through Falls Church is also coincident with Virginia State Route 237. Most of Virginia State Route 338 is also within Falls Church. Interstate 66 passes just north of the city, while Interstate 495 passes a few miles to the west.

== Notable people ==
- Golnar Adili (born 1976), multidisciplinary artist
- Brian Alvey, entrepreneur
- Tommy Amaker (born 1965), current men's basketball head coach at Harvard University
- Bruce Bochy, former Major League Baseball player, and 4x World Series champion as a manager; 2010, 2012, 2014, and 2023); finished his career as the manager of the Texas Rangers. Moved to Melbourne, Florida, in his late teens.
- Allan Bridge, conceptual artist
- Jane Brucker, actress and screenwriter
- Ruby Bradley (1907–2002), U.S. Army colonel
- Caroline Calloway, Instagram personality
- Hal Corley, Emmy-winning TV writer, published playwright
- Jayme Cramer, backstroke and butterfly swimmer
- Adam Edwards, racing driver
- Abraham Flexner, educator known for his role in the 20th-century reform of medical and higher education
- Nick Galifianakis, cartoonist
- Ryan Hall, professional mixed martial artist who won the 22nd season of The Ultimate Fighter, now currently competing in the featherweight division of the UFC.
- John Hartman, musician and founding member of The Doobie Brothers
- Molly Henneberg, news reporter, grew up in Falls Church
- John Kirby, attorney, credited as namesake for Nintendo's character "Kirby"
- Maria Korsnick, nuclear plant operator and advocate
- Louisa Krause, actress
- Nancy Kyes, film and television actress
- Taryn Manning, actress
- Matthew F. McHugh, former US congressman
- Kyle E. McSlarrow, former Deputy Secretary of the United States Department of Energy
- Patricia Mernone, racing driver and organic chemist
- Alixa Naff, historian
- Joseph Harvey Riley, ornithologist
- Joe Saunders, former pitcher for the Arizona Diamondbacks.
- Eric Schmidt (born 1955), Executive Chairman & former CEO of Google, former CEO of Novell, 96th-richest person in the world as of April 2021
- Mohamed Soltan, political activist
- Fred Talbot (1941–2013), professional baseball player
- Tatianna, drag performer and competitor on RuPaul's Drag Race
- James Thurber (1894–1961) author and humorist, namesake of James Thurber Ct. in Falls Church
- Marie Hirst Yochim, 35th President General of the Daughters of the American Revolution

== In popular culture ==
- The principal characters in the television series The Americans, Philip and Elizabeth Jennings, and their children Paige and Henry, as well as FBI agent Stan Beeman, live in Falls Church.
- In the TV Series JAG, their headquarters is located in Falls Church, Virginia.

== Sister city ==
In 2006, Falls Church entered into a sister city relationship with Kokolopori, Democratic Republic of the Congo.

== See also ==
- Falls Church Airpark
